= Jucker (card game) =

Alsatian and Palatine card game

- Ancestor of Euchre
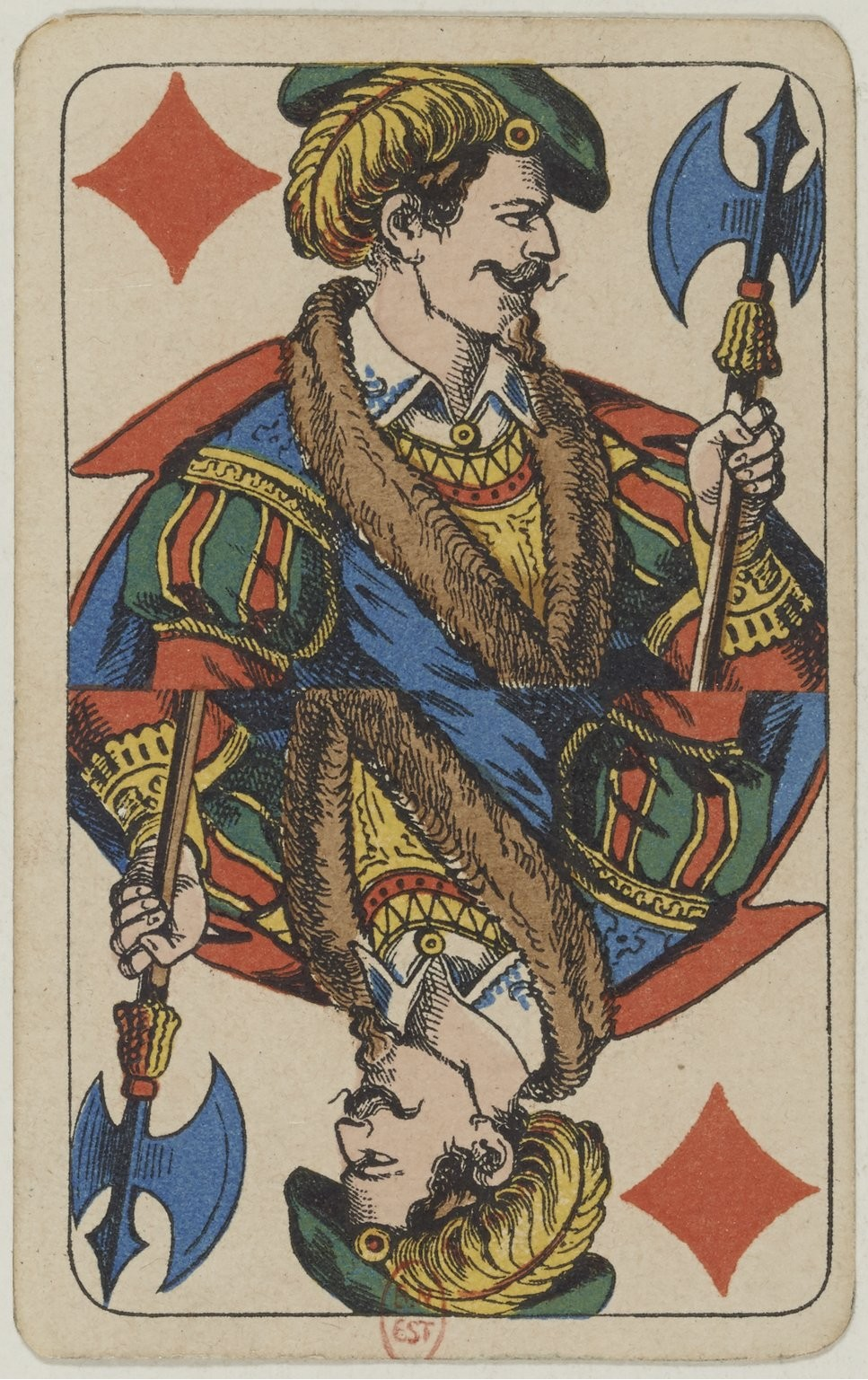
- The Bauer was higher than the Ace
- Origin: Alsace
- Alternative names: Juckerspiel, Juckern
- Type: Plain-trick game
- Family: Euchre group
- Rank (high→low): J > A, otherwise unknown

Related games
- Bester Bube • Euchre • Lanterloo • Reunion

Jucker, also known as Juckerspiel ("game of Jucker") or Juckern ("playing Jucker"), is a card game that was popular in the Alsace and Palatinate regions on either side of the modern Franco-German border. It is believed to be the ancestor of Euchre and may have given its name to the playing card known as the Joker.

== History ==
The earliest known reference to the game occurs in 1792 in a German dictionary, as Juckern, where it is described as "a game with cards" and assigned to the Palatinate region. By 1848 it was well known enough for Spindler to mention it in his Vergißmeinnicht ("Forget-me-Not"), in which a young man gambles his time away in pubs playing various games including Jucker ([er] juckert). In Erckmann-Chatrian's 1864 novel L'ami Fritz, set in Alsace, there are frequent references in French to playing the game of youker as far back as the 1830s. In 1856, Hackländer recounts playing Juckern, a new game to him, in the Rhineland region. The game also appears in an 1874 book of poetry in the dialect of the Hunsrück region of Germany in 1874 and in an article in a Palatinate newspaper that same year as played socially by ordinary folk alongside Tarock.

No complete rules have been found, but Martin and Lienhart (1899) describe Jucker as a "card game in which the Bauer [ Jack ] is worth more than the Ace" and a Marsch was to take all five tricks in Jucker. Rausch (1908) states that Juckerspiel was widespread in Alsace and e Marsch mache means to take all the tricks and that the Bauer is the highest card. Modern sources state that the game was played in the Rhineland and the South Hessian region.

== Euchre ancestor ==
Jucker has been suggested as the ancestor of the popular American game, Euchre, on the basis of chronology, linguistics and mode of play. 19th century American sources show that eucre was being played as early as 1810 and that by 1829, as uker, it was played with Bowers as early as 1829 in the American Mid-West, and that Euchre was invented in America during the 1820s from the mixing of Écarté with ideas from German card games by German immigrants. Bumppo (1999) refutes the "canard" of a link with Ecarté pointing out that the two games emerged at roughly the same time and that Ecarté is a two-handed game in which Jacks are not the top trumps.

David Parlett, an expert on the history of card games, goes further and argues that, "on linguistic grounds alone there can be no doubt as to [Euchre's] origin in the Alsatian game of Juckerspiel as brought to America by German immigrants." Not only are Jucker and Euchre phonetically alike, but the terms Bauer and Marsch have been imported into Euchre as 'Bower' and 'march'. His conclusion is that Euchre derives from the Alsatian game of Jucker which, in turn, is descended from Triomphe or French Ruff, probably via Bête.

== Related games ==
Recently, members of the International Playing Card Society identified two games, still being played today in the region north of Alsace in the area of Rhineland-Palatinate (Rheinland-Pfalz) in Germany, that could be descendants of Juckerspiel: Bauer and Hunsrücker Bauern.

=== Hunsrücker Bauern ===
Possibly the closest relative of Juckerspiel is a variant of Bauer, or Bauern, played in the Hunsrück, uses 32 French-suited cards and is a six-handed, two-team game in which there are two Jacks as top trumps: the trump Jack and the Jack of the same colour. Like Jucker, players receive 5 cards each and there is a bonus for a slam, known as a Durch (short for German Durchmarsch, means "marching through", taking all tricks). If the cut card is a Jack, it determines the trump suit unless superseded later. Players are dealt five cards each from a skat pack and, if trumps have not already been decided, the top card of the skat is turned for trump. If it is a Jack, it determines trumps even if the cut card was a Jack. If it is a Jack, the bottom card of the skat is turned and, if it is the same suit, dealer may exchange with it. If not, players are asked in turn if they will play with the turnup suit. If any player says yes, the dealer may exchange with it. If no-one wants to play with the turnup suit, it is turned over again and players are asked if they will play with another suit. If all pass, the cards are redealt. This process is similar to that used in Euchre. Teams start with five lines marked on a slate (Striche) and play for the best of five tricks. If the declarers win, they erase a line; if they lose, they add a line and the winners erase a line.

=== Bauer ===
There is another version of Bauer played in the Saarland which is a four-handed, plain trick, partnership game. This time 8 cards are dealt to each player clockwise in two packets of 4, trumps being chosen by forehand after the first packet has been dealt. It employs a 32-card, French-suited Skat pack and there are 2 Jacks (Bauern) as top trumps: the trump Jack or Dicke ("fat one") and the Jack of the same suit colour or Linke ("left one"). Forehand leads with a trump (sometimes optional). Suit must be followed, but players may play any card if unable to follow. Teams start with eight points and aim to be first to zero, one point being deducted to the winners of a deal if they declared trumps. If the declarers lose, they add a point and their opponents deduct one. On reaching zero, the team earns a Brot ("loaf" or "roll"; translation: "bread") or Schrööm. The equivalent of a going alone is Karten weg ("cards away") which is announced by a player who intends to take every trick. The partner's cards are set aside and the player wanting to "make a march" ("einen Durchmarsch machen") leads off. Winning earns an extra Brot. The game is sometimes played with a shortened pack of 20 cards or by two teams of 3.

=== Reunion ===
Reunion, a 19th-century Rhineland game, also shares the feature of having two Jacks as the top trumps, but is a three-hand game played with 10-card hands and a 32-card Skat pack.

=== Bester Bube ===
Bester Bube also employs two Jacks as top trumps and a 5-card hand, but is a member of the Rams group in which players may drop out if they do not think their hand is strong enough. There appears to be no equivalent of the Marsch.

== Literature ==
- Bumppo, Natty (1999). The Columbus Book of Euchre. 2nd edn. Brownsville, KY: Borf. ISBN 0960489460
- Cowell, Joseph (1845) [1844] Thirty Years passed among the Players in England and America. Part 2: America. NY: Harper.
- Erckmann-Chatrian (1864). L’Ami Fritz. Paris: Librairie Hachette.
- Hackländer, F. W. "Die erste Versammlung deutscher bildender Künstler" in Hausblätter published by Hackländer and Edmund Hoefer. Vol. 4. Stuttgart: Adolph Krabbe.
- Martin, Ernst and Hans Lienhart (1899). Wörterbuch der elsässischen Mundarten, Vol. 1 (A E I O U F V G H J K L M N), Trübner, Strassburg.
- Maurer et al. (1965-2010). Südhessisches Wörterbuch.
- Müller, Josef (1928). Rheinisches Wörterbuch, Vol. 3. Fritz Klopp, Bonn.
- Parlett, David (1990). A History of Card Games, OUP, Oxford. ISBN 0-19-282905-X
- Parlett, David (2006), "The Origins of Euchre," in The Playing-Card, Vol. 35. No. 4. Apr-Jun 2007. pp. 255 ff.
- Piomingo [John Robinson] (1810). The Savage. Philadelphia: Thomas S. Manning
- Rausch, Heinrich Adam (1908). "Das Spielverzeichnis im 25. Kapitel von Fischarts "Geschichtklitterung" (Gargantua)" in Jahrbuch für Geschichte, Sprache und Literatur Elsass-Lothringens, Vol. 24. Heitz.
- Rottmann, P. J. (1874). Gedichte in Hunsrücker Mundart, R . Voigtländer, Kreuznach.
- Spindler, Carl (1848). Vergißmeinnicht: Taschenbuch der Liebe, der Freundschaft und dem Familienleben gewidmet. Franckh, Stuttgart.
- Von Klein, Anton Edeln (1792). Deutsches Provinzialwörterbuch. 1st edn. Vol. 1. Frankfurt & Leipzig.
- "W." (1874). "Miscellen" in Palatina: Heimatblatt des Pfälzer Anzeigers. No. 153. Thursday, 24 December 1874. Speyer. p. 612.
