= Lanter =

Lanter may refer to:

- Lanter (card game), another name for the English card game, Lanterloo
- Matt Lanter (b 1983), US actor and model

== See also ==
- Lenter
