= Jack shit =

Jack shit may refer to:

- Nothing
- Jack Shit, the stagename of Chris Jacobson, bassist of the band Mentors
- Jack Shit!, a 2011 art exhibition of works by Gavin Turk
- Jack Shit, a card hand in Euchre variations
- Jackshit, a country music band composed of Val McCallum, Davey Faragher and Pete Thomas
