= Joker (playing card) =

Playing card

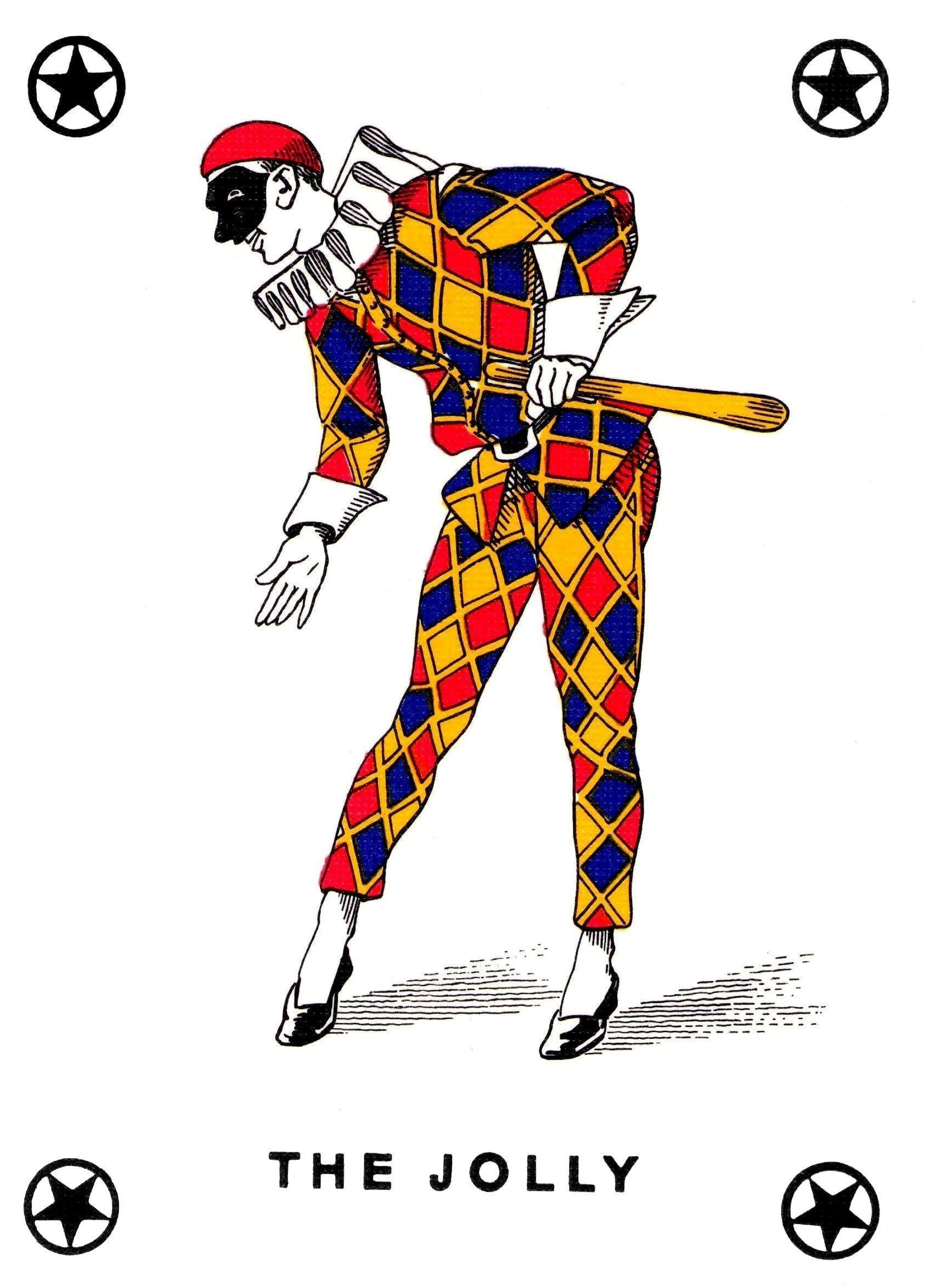
An Italian Joker card

The Joker is a playing card found in most modern French-suited card decks, as an addition to the standard four suits (Clubs, Diamonds, Hearts, and Spades). Since the second half of the 20th century, they have also been found in Spanish- and Italian-suited decks, excluding stripped decks.

The Joker originated in the United States during the Civil War, and was created as a trump card for the game of Euchre. It has since been adopted into many other card games, where it often acts as a wild card, but may have other functions such as the top trump, a skip card (forcing another player to miss a turn), the lowest-ranking card, the highest-value card, or a card of a different value from the rest of the pack (see e.g. Zwicker which has six Jokers with this function).

By contrast, a wild card is any card that may be used to represent another card or cards – it does not need to be a Joker.

== Origin ==
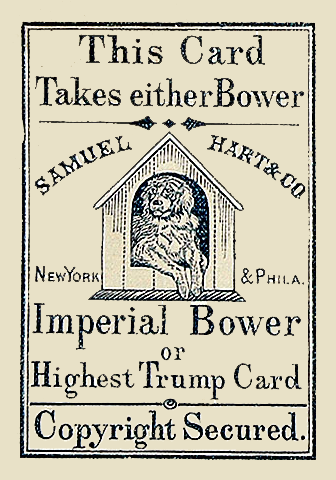
Imperial Bower, the earliest Joker, by Samuel Hart, c. 1863

The game of Euchre is credited with the introduction of the Joker into card games. However, Euchre originally did not use Jokers. In the earliest rules of 1844, 32 standard cards are used and the Right Bower, the trump Jack, was the "commanding card" with the Left Bower, the Jack of the same colour, as the second-highest card. According to card game historian, David Parlett, the Joker was added to a 32‑card pack in the 1850s specifically for the game of Euchre and is first mentioned in a set of rules in 1868 where the blank specimen card is adapted for use in play. This gave rise to a variant game called "Euchre with the Joker" in which the blank card ranked above all the rest. While the term "best bower" appears in a satirical 1861 piece about the American Civil War, this may only refer to the Right Bower and not a special card produced for that purpose. Samuel Hart is credited with printing the first illustrated "Best Bower" card in 1863 with his "Imperial Bower". Best Bower-type Jokers continued to be produced well into the 20th century. Cards labelled "Joker" began appearing around the late 1860s, with some depicting clowns and jesters such as Elizabethan jester Richard Tarlton.

The idea behind the three top cards in Euchre appears to have originated from Germany where the games Juckerspiel and Bester Bube ("Best Bower") also used Jacks as best, right and left bowers. It is also believed that the term "Joker" comes from Juckerspiel, which is also known as Jucker, the original German spelling of Euchre. One British manufacturer, Charles Goodall, was manufacturing packs with Jokers for the American market in 1871. The first Joker for the domestic British market was sold in 1874. Italians call Jokers "Jolly", for many early cards were labelled "Jolly Joker".

The notion of a Joker was later transferred to the game of Poker where it was initially called the Mistigris. This happened around 1875, where it functioned as a wild card. Packs with two Jokers started to become the norm during the late 1940s for the game of Canasta. Since the 1950s, German and Austrian packs have included three Jokers to play German Rummy. In Poland, the third Joker is known as the blue Joker because the KZWP monopoly during the Polish People's Republic printed all third Jokers blue. In Schleswig-Holstein, Zwicker packs come with six Jokers.

== Appearance ==
Jokers do not have any standardized appearance across the card manufacturing industry. Each company produces their own depictions of the card. The publishers of playing cards trademark their Jokers, which have unique artwork that often reflects contemporary culture. Out of convention, Jokers tend to be illustrated as jesters. There are usually two Jokers per deck, often noticeably different. For instance, the United States Playing Card Company (USPCC) prints one as monochrome and the other in colour. At times, the Jokers will each be colored to match the colors used for suits; e.g., there will be a red Joker and a black Joker. In games where the Jokers may need to be compared, the red, full-color, or larger-graphic Joker usually outranks the black, monochrome, or smaller-graphic one. If the Joker colors are similar, the Joker without a guarantee will outrank the guaranteed one. With the red and black Jokers, the red one can alternately be counted as a Heart/Diamond and the black one can alternately be counted as a Club/Spade. The Unicode for playing cards provide symbols for three Jokers: red, black, and white.

Character information
Preview						
Unicode name	PLAYING CARD RED JOKER		PLAYING CARD BLACK JOKER		PLAYING CARD WHITE JOKER	
Encodings	decimal	hex	dec	hex	dec	hex
Unicode	127167	U+1F0BF	127183	U+1F0CF	127199	U+1F0DF
UTF-8	240 159 130 191	F0 9F 82 BF	240 159 131 143	F0 9F 83 8F	240 159 131 159	F0 9F 83 9F
UTF-16	55356 56511	D83C DCBF	55356 56527	D83C DCCF	55356 56543	D83C DCDF
Numeric character reference	&#127167;	&#x1F0BF;	&#127183;	&#x1F0CF;	&#127199;	&#x1F0DF;

Many decks do not provide the Joker with a corner index symbol; of those that do, the most common is a solid star (as is the case with Bee cards). It is also common for decks to simply display the word "JOKER" in the corner. Bicycle cards use a "US" monogram as the Joker index.

== Collecting ==
Joker collecting has been popular for an unknown amount of time, but with the advent of the Internet and social media, it has emerged as a hobby. Many unusual Jokers are available for purchase online, while other collectible Jokers are catalogued online for viewing. Guinness World Records has recognized Denoto de Santis, an Italian magician, as having the world's largest collection of Jokers.

== Tarot and Tarock card games ==
The Joker is often compared to "(the) Fool" in the Tarot or Tarock decks. They share many similarities both in appearance and in play function. In central Europe, the Fool, or Sküs, is the highest trump; elsewhere as an "excuse" (L'Excuse) that can be played at any time to avoid following suit, but cannot win.

== Use of the Joker in card games ==
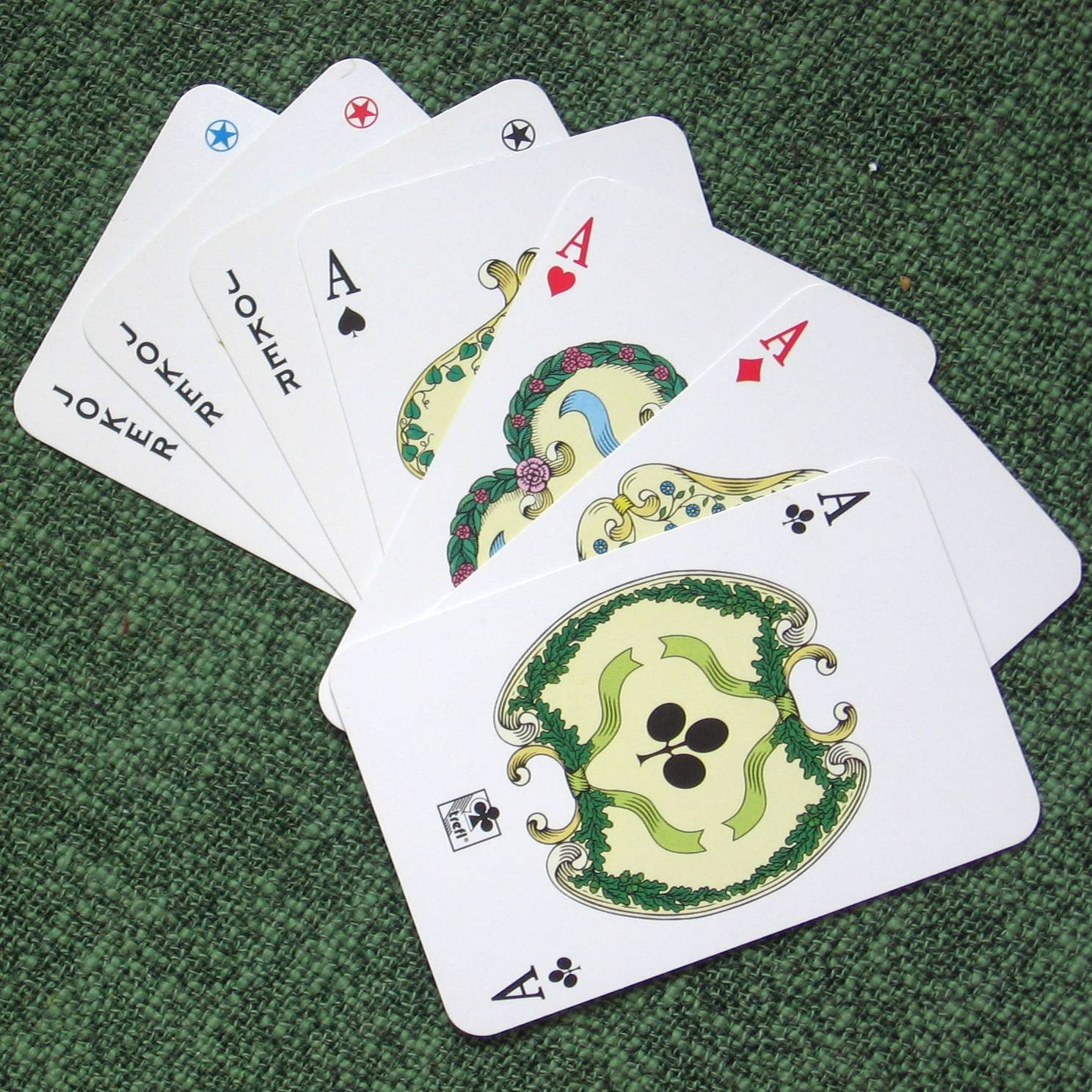
Three Jokers and four Aces by the Trefl Playing Card Company of Poland with its characteristic third blue Joker

In a standard deck in the US or Britain, there are usually two Jokers. In other countries, such as Germany, there are usually three Jokers in a pack. The Joker's use varies greatly. Many card games omit the cards entirely; as a result, Jokers are sometimes used as informal replacements for lost or damaged cards in a deck by simply noting the lost card's rank and suit on the Joker. Other games, such as a 25‑card variant of Euchre which uses the Joker as the highest trump, make it one of the most important in the game. Often, the Joker is a wild card, which allows it to represent other existing cards. The term "Joker's wild" originates from this practice. However, in Zwicker, Jokers are higher value, matching and scoring cards while, in one variant, a normal suit card is the only one that is wild.

The Joker can be an extremely good or extremely bad card to have, depending on the game you are playing. In Euchre it is often used to represent the highest trump. In Rummy it is wild. However, in the children's game of Old Maid, a solitary Joker represents the Old Maid, the card to be avoided.

=== Role in multi-player games ===
- Euchre, 500: As the highest trump or "top Bower".
- Canasta: Uses two or three Jokers per deck. The Joker, like the deuce, is a wild card. However, the Joker is worth fifty points in melding, as opposed to twenty for the deuce.
- Rummy: a wild card, able to be used as any necessary rank or suit to complete a meld.
- Chase the Joker: An alternative version of Old Maid, where the Joker card is used instead of the Ace.
- Poker: A Joker can be wild, or can be a "bug", a limited form of wild card which can be used only to complete straights and flushes.
- War: In some variations, beats all other cards.
- Pitch: A point card in some variations. Jokers usually are marked as "high" and "low", one outranking the other.
- Daifugō: a wild card, or a deuce (which ends the round and clears the discard pile).
- Crazy Eights: a "skip" card, playable on top of any other card, that forces the next player to lose a turn.
- Spades: uncommon, but can fulfil one of two roles. When playing with three or six players, they are added to make the cards deal evenly (eighteen or nine cards each, respectively). They are either "junk" cards playable any time that cannot win a trick, or they count as the two highest trumps (the two Jokers must be differentiable; the "big Joker" outranks the "little Joker"). They also can be used in conjunction with teammates' cards to create a "pseudo-trump", e.g. an Ace of Hearts and a Joker played together could be counted as an Ace of Spades, inferior only to a natural Ace of Spades.
- Double Pedro: As the lowest-ranked card, but worth 18 points.
- Go Fish: In the pair-forming variant played between two players, the Joker pair is often used to bring the number of pairs to 27 and prevent a 13–13 tie.
- Dou dizhu: Jokers are used as the highest value cards; one is little and one is big, usually the colored one being bigger. Both Jokers together is the only unbeatable play.
- Bōzu mekuri: Uses Semimaru in an Uta-garuta deck as a joker. When drawn, the player may collect all discarded cards. However, if he is drawn on the last turn, then the player automatically loses instead.

=== Role in patience (solitaire) games ===
Generally, the Joker is omitted from patience games as in many others of its type. However, there are variations of solitaire games where a Joker does take part, most often as a wild card.

- Forty Thieves: the Joker is placed on the foundations, while the natural card is unavailable. Any applicable cards are placed over the Joker. When the natural card becomes available, it replaces the Joker, which in turn is placed on the top of the foundation pile. When the Joker is placed on an empty foundation, it stays there until an Ace appears.
- FreeCell: the Joker functions the same way as mentioned above, but when the natural card it replaces becomes available and the Joker is placed on top, the Joker can be placed on another foundation.
- Golf: where Kings can be built, the Joker, whenever available, is placed on the wastepile as a wild card and any card can be placed over it.
- Klondike: the Joker acts the same way as it is in Forty Thieves. It can also be built while it is still on the tableau. The United States Playing Card Company's version, created by Joli Quentin Kansil, uses two Jokers, with the black Joker to be used as a wild black card and the red Joker as a wild red card.
- Pyramid: the Joker is discarded together with any available card. In this case, the stock is dealt one card at time and can be reused twice.
- Aces Up: The Jokers are used to clear out a row and are sometimes referred to as "Joker bombs". When a Joker is dealt into a column, the entire column is reshuffled into the stock and that particular Joker is removed from the game. This leaves an empty foundation slot and greatly increases the win rate.

== See also ==
- Balatro
- Wild card

== Bibliography ==
- Faulkner, Thomas C. (1861). History of the Revolution in the Southern States Including the Special Messages of President Buchanan: the Ordinances of Secession of the Six Withdrawing States ... Etc. J.F. Trow, printer. OCLC 18113349.
- Mathews, Thomas (1844). The Whist Player's Handbook. Philadelphia: Isaac M. Moss.
- Parlett, David (1992). The Dictionary of Card Games. Oxford: OUP.
- Porter, Ian (2010). "Classifying Non-standard Playing Cards" in The Playing-Card, Vol. 38, No. 3 (Jan–Mar 2010). pp. 203–208. ISSN 1752-671X
- The Modern Pocket Hoyle. New York: Dick & Fitzgerald. 1868.
