= Euchre variants =

Card game variants

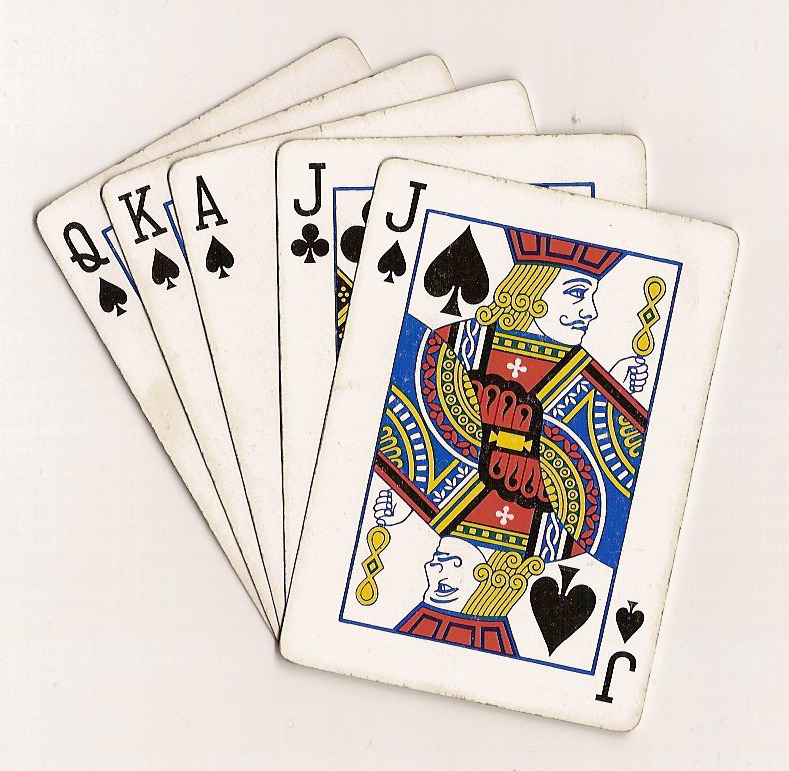
- Origin: United States
- Family: Trick-taking
- Players: 2–6
- Skills: Strategy and probability
- Cards: 20, 24, 2×24, 32, 36
- Deck: French-suited aka Anglo-American
- Play: Clockwise
- Playing time: 20 min.
- Chance: Medium

Related games
- Juckerspiel

The card game of Euchre has many variants, including those for two, three, five or more players. The following is a selection of the Euchre variants found in reliable sources.

== Standard play and terminology ==
The following common rules apply to all the variants described excepted where stated:

=== Cards ===
A pack of 24, 28 or 32 cards is used. If a standard 52-card pack is used, the 2s, 3s, 4s, 5s and 6s are always removed. In addition, the 7s are removed to form a 28-card pack and the 7s and 8s to form a 24-card pack. In the trump suit the two top cards are the trump jack or right bower (RB), and the next jack (jack of the same color) or left bower (LB). Thus the card ranking is:

- Trumps: RB > LB> A > K> Q > 10 > 9 > (8) > (7)
- Side suits: A > K> Q > (J) > 10 > 9 > (8) > (7)

=== Deal and play ===
Deal and play are clockwise or alternate if there are two players. Eldest hand, the player to the left of the dealer, is always the first to receive cards, bid and lead to the first trick. In two-handed games, the non-dealer has this privilege.

Whist rules of play apply i.e. players must follow suit if able; otherwise may play any card. The player with the highest trump takes the trick or the player with the highest card of the led suit if no trumps were played. The trick winner leads to the next trick.

=== Terminology ===
The following are commonly used euchre terms:

- Bridge. When the trailing team are 4 points off winning or catching up.
- Cards away. Obsolete expression for going alone, q.v.
- Defender. An opponent of the makers.
- Dutching. When the dealer has turned down the upcard, to entrump the suit of the same colour.
- Euchre. When the makers fail to take at least 3 tricks they are euchred.
- Going alone. To play alone against the two defenders.
- Maker. The player who decides trump.
- March. Taking all tricks, which scores 2 points.
- Order up. As a non-dealer, to accept the turnup as trump.
- Turn down. As dealer, after everyone else has passed, to reject the turnup.

== Two-handed variants ==
=== Two-handed Euchre ===
A basic two-player version simply called "Two-handed Euchre" was described as early as 1863 by George Pardon:

A 32-card Piquet pack is used. Players cut for deal, higher wins. Dealer deals two cards to non-dealer, then two to self; followed by three cards each in the same order. The 11th card is turned as a potential trump. Non-dealer may say "I pass", to reject the suit of the upcard as trump, or "I order it up" to accept it. In the latter case, the dealer discards a card, picks up the entrumped upcard and play begins. If non-dealer passes, the dealer may say "I'll play" and exchange with the upcard. If both pass, non-dealer may pass again or name any other suit as trumps; if non-dealer passes, the dealer has the same options. If both pass twice, the cards are thrown in and the deal changes hands.

The player who accepts the upcard as trump or, if both passed first time, who names another trump suit, scores 1 point by taking at least 3 tricks; otherwise the maker is euchred and the defender scores 2 points. Taking all 5 tricks scores 2 points. Game is 5 points.

=== Two-handed Euchre with extra hands ===
In a "more interesting version" of the above, there are only 24 cards, but two hands of 5 cards are dealt to each player, only one of which is picked up. The non-dealer may exchange this first hand for the second one. Then the dealer may do likewise. If the non-dealer did not exchange, the dealer may exchange a second time with the non-dealer's second hand. Similarly if the non-dealer exchanged, but the dealer did not, the non-dealer may exchange with the dealer's second hand.

A player may "go alone" in the sense of committing to take all 5 tricks (a march), but is euchred if unsuccessful. The defender may "defend alone" if the maker goes alone, raising the score for a euchre to 4 points; however, if the maker scores 2 points for taking 3 tricks or more.

=== Two-handed Euchre with dummy ===
A normal hand is dealt out to each player along with a 3-card dummy hand to each player. Each person picks up their dummy hand after trump has been called. Each player must make their best five card hand out of the eight cards available. Going alone is still an option and occurs when the calling player opts not to pick up the dummy hand.

=== Two-handed Euchre with straw men ===
This "popular version" resembles Officers' Skat in that each player is deal a row of 4 downcards followed by a row of 4 upcards on top of the first row, and finally 4 hand cards. Non-dealer bids a target number of tricks if allowed to name trump (or no trump). Dealer must pass or outbid. If he outbids, non-dealer may raise or pass. The winner of this auction names trump or no trump. Players may play from the hand or their upcards. As an upcard is played, the one beneath it is turned and becomes available. Players score 1 point per trick taken unless the trump maker fails to achieve the bid number of tricks, in which case the bid number is deducted from the maker's score.

== Three-handed variants ==
=== Three-handed Euchre ===
Again, the earliest and basic rules are by George Pardon (1863). All is as per his two-handed version above except that 15 cards are dealt out, clockwise, to give each player the usual 5 cards. Eldest hand receives cards, bids and leads first each time. Tactically, players may co-operate for mutual benefit e.g. if one player is on 4 points and about to win, the other two may help one another to prevent the first player from winning.

=== Buck Euchre ===
Buck Euchre, also known as Dirty Clubs or Cut-throat Euchre, is a North American variant for three or four players in which there are no partnerships. In the three-player version described by John McLeod, four hands are dealt, one to each player and a widow placed face-down on the table. As in the Tarot game of Cego, players, in turn, may opt to exchange their hand with the widow unless an earlier player has beat them to it. Usually, the player to the right of the dealer goes first, then the dealer and finally the player to the dealer's left. There is then an auction in which players bid the number of tricks they hope to take. Each player must bid higher than any previous bid and the bidding may go around more than once; passing does not prevent a later bid. Once two players have passed in succession, the remaining player names trumps or announces "no trump". The others then decide whether to play or drop out. Players start with 15 points apiece and deduct 1 for each trick taken, except that a player who takes no tricks or a bidder who fails to reach the target bid, adds 5 points. The first to reach zero wins. A player with ≤ 5 points may not drop out. If more than one player reaches zero on the same hand, the one with the most negative score wins.

=== Cut-throat Euchre ===
Cut-throat Euchre is described as early as 1885 in a London publication. Each player is dealt a hand of five cards and each plays the other two. The player who "orders up", "takes up", or "makes" any suit trumps becomes the maker and plays against the others who form a temporary alliance. The maker scores 1 point for 3 or 4 tricks, 3 points for 5 tricks, and the defenders each get 2 points for 3 or more tricks. The name Cut-throat Euchre is also applied to Buck Euchre.

== Four-handed variants ==
=== Railroad Euchre ===
Railroad Euchre appears as early as 1868 in The Modern Pocket Hoyle. It is played with a 33-card pack "consisting of a regular Euchre pack, and an additional blank card, which is usually called the "Joker," or imperial trump." It differs from regular Euchre in that:

- Game is 10 points.
- A player who elects to "go alone" may call for the partner's best card and give another card in exchange. Either defender may do likewise and they will score 4 points for a euchre.
- Lap, Slam and Jamboree are played (see below).
- If the joker is turned, the dealer may immediately name any suit for trumps without prejudicing the right to turn it down as part of the normal trump making process.

=== Lap, Slam, Jambone and Jamboree ===
"Trumps" believed these variations were of "Southern origin where Euchre has long been a decided favorite and where these variations are more frequently played than in any other part of our country."

- Lap. A scoring system in which the winner carried any excess points (those over 5) into the next game.
- Slam or Love. This was a game won in which the opponents failed to score and was worth a double game.
- Jambone. The lone player (as maker) played ouvert and the eldest hand was entitled to say which card should be played to the first trick, as long as the Jambone player is not deprived of the right to trump if unable to follow. If the Jambone player was eldest, the next player had the right to choose the led card. If the Jambone player only took 3 or 4 tricks, 1 point was scored; any fewer and the defenders scored 8 points.
- Jamboree. The combination of the 5 highest cards – both bowers, A, K and Q in trumps – is announced and immediately scores 16 points, worth 3 games plus 1 point.

== Five-handed variant ==
Robert Frederick Foster published the rules of "Euchre for Five Players" in 1897. They are the same as his seven-handed version, but with a pack of just 28 cards and no joker. Five cards each are dealt in two rounds of 2 then 3 cards each, leaving a widow of 3 cards. A player bidding 3 tricks takes one partner; 4 or 5 tricks, 2 partners. A player using the widow but no partners can bid 8 points and one intending to play without the widow or partners bids 15. Game is 100 points.

== Six-handed variants ==
=== Six-handed Cornish Euchre ===
In Cornwall, England, the six-hand variant is played by two teams of three who sit alternately. The game is played either with 33 cards (Joker plus AKQJ10987) or a double 25-card pack (50 cards including 2 jokers or Bennies). In the latter case, if two identical cards are played to a trick, the second beats the first. If the two Bennies come together and they are red and black, the joker of the trump colour takes the trick; otherwise the second beats first. If a player goes alone, both partners discard their hands face down and the lone player may ask either for a card. The partner asked may hand over any card and the lone player discards a card face-down in return. The score for a march or a euchre is 3 points instead of 2. If the winner is playing alone, the score is 6 points instead of 4.

=== Six-handed Almonte Euchre ===
All is as in Cornish Euchre above except that a 31-card pack is used (3 "jokers" plus JAKQ1098). The 3 jokers are represented by three cards in the suit of spades, thus the trump ranking is: ♠4 > ♠3 > ♠2 > RB > LB > A > K > Q > 10 > 9 > 8. Dealer deals 5 cards each and turns the last. If it is a joker, dealer names trump before viewing any cards. Game is 15.

== Seven-handed variant ==
Seven-handed Euchre is first described by Robert Frederick Foster in 1897.

It is played with a full 52-card pack plus a joker, which is the top trump, the rest of the cards ranking as in other forms of the game. A white counter is used to indicate the next dealer and the red counters are placed in front of the trump maker and maker's partners. Score is kept on paper, ideally by a non-player.

Players draw cards from a spread pack for seats, low having priority over high. The player cutting the lowest card deals first. Cards are dealt clockwise, 2 to each player in the first round, 3 more in the second, and another 2 in the third round, so that each player has 7 cards. The 4 remaining cards are placed face down as the widow.

There is one round of bidding by escalation. Eldest opens by passing or bidding a number of points and naming a suit as trump. Later players must outbid earlier ones. The highest bidder exchanges any number of cards with the widow, places a red counter on the table and chooses partners by handing them a red counter each. If the highest bid was no more than 5 tricks, two partners are chosen; if 6 or 7 tricks, three partners.

A player confident of taking all 7 tricks may bid 10, which outranks a bid of 7, but must do so before seeing the widow. If confident of taking 7 tricks without the widow or partners, the player bids 20.

The maker leads to the first trick, otherwise play is as normal. If the maker is successful, the maker's team each score exactly the points bid. If the makers fail, each defender scores the bid points.

== See also ==
- Euchre - standard Euchre
- Bid Euchre - a variant form
- Glossary of card game terms

== Literature ==
- _ (1885). A New Book of Sports. London: Richard Bentley.
- Bumppo, Natty (1999). The Columbus Book of Euchre. Brownsville, KY: Borf. ISBN 0960489460
- "Trumps" (1868). The Modern Pocket Hoyle. 4th edn. New York: Dick & Fitzgerald. FV
- Foster, Robert Frederick (1897). Foster’s Complete Hoyle. 3rd edn. NY and London: Frederick.A. Stokes.
- Pardon, George Frederick (1863). The Card Player. London and NY: Routledge.
- Scarne, John (1994). Scarne's Encyclopedia of Card Games. HarperCollins. pp. 239–242. ISBN 978-0-06-273155-5.
