= Bester Bube =

Card game

- Old north European game with two Jacks as top trumps
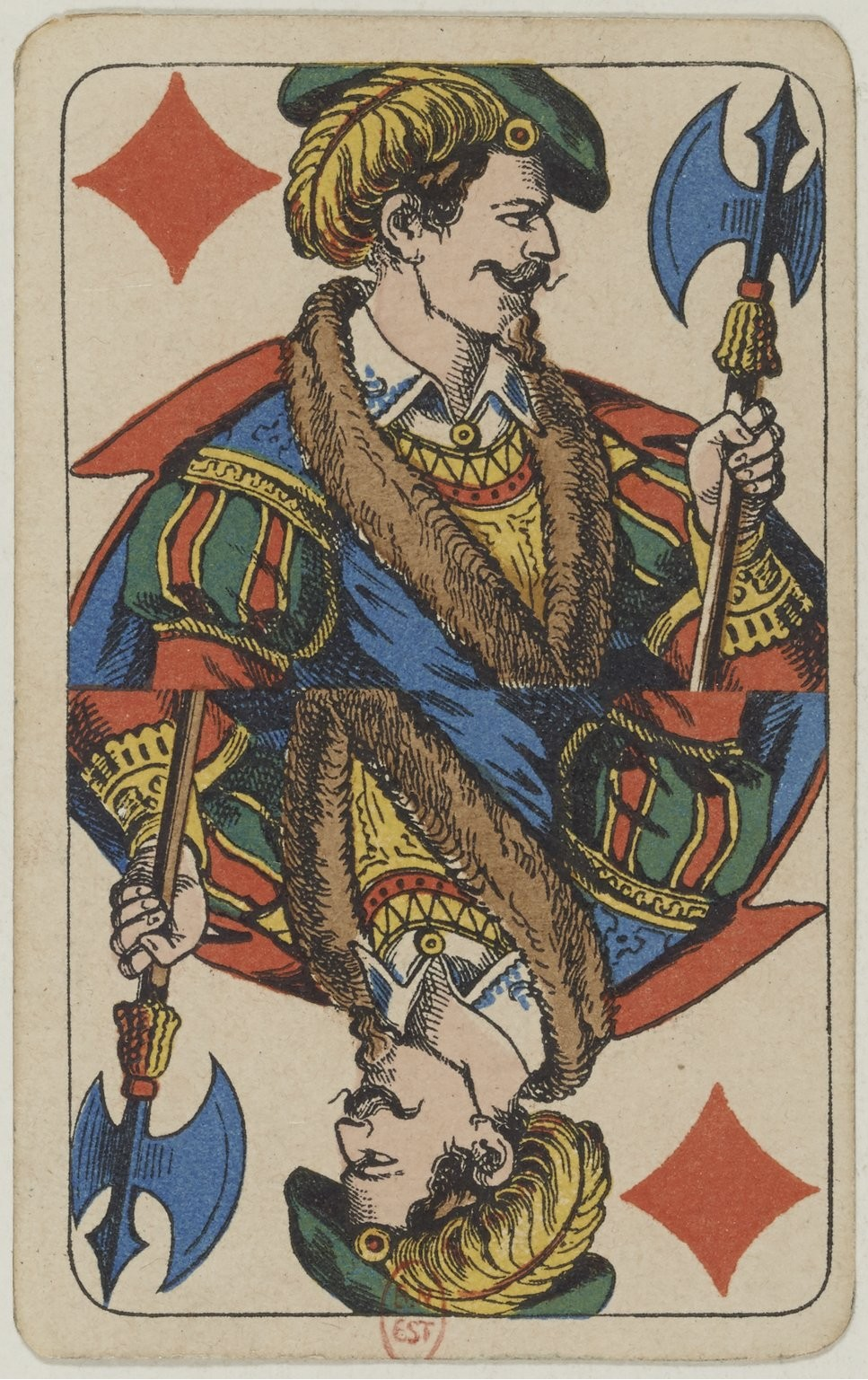
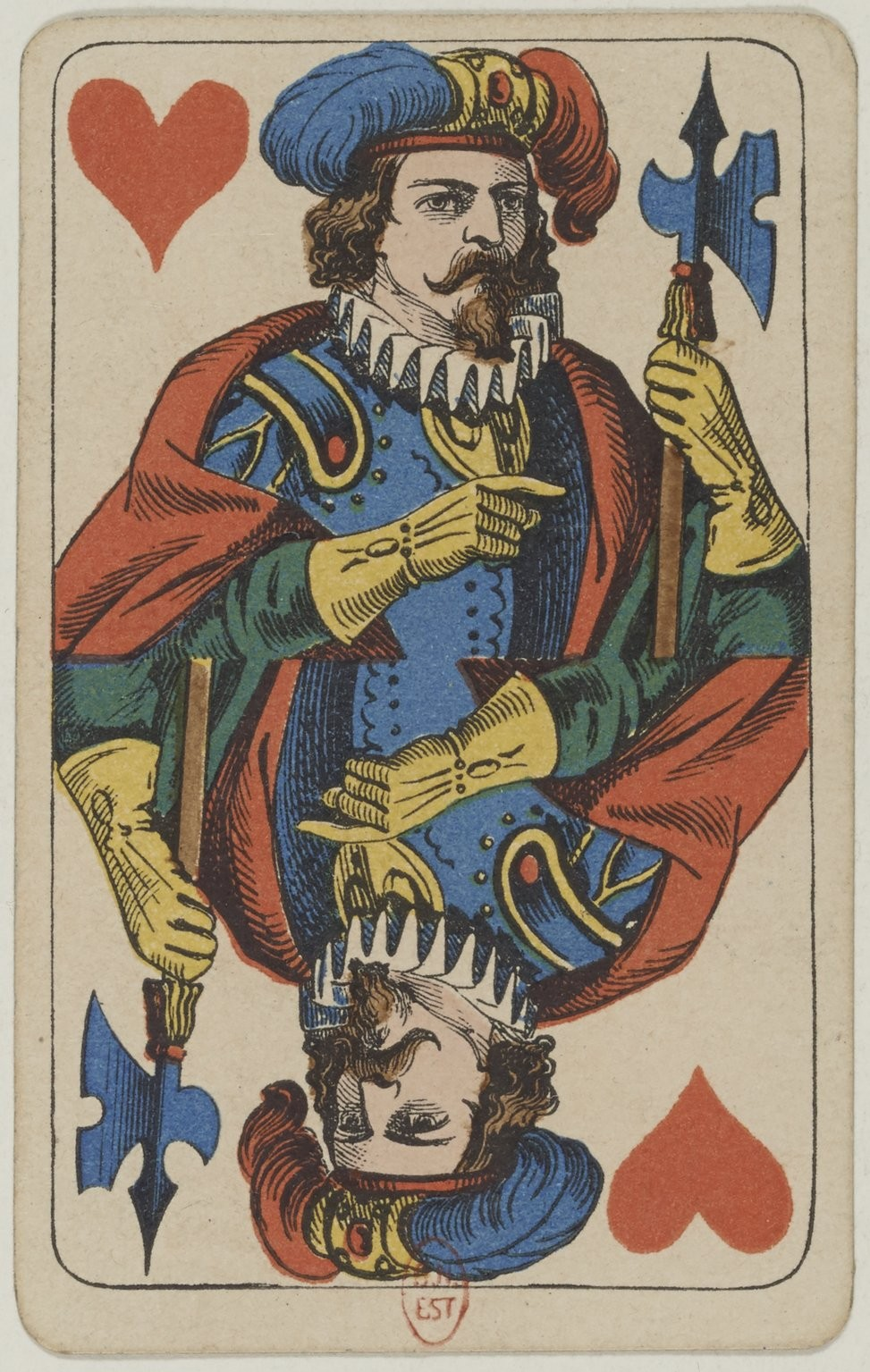
- Best and Under Bowers if ♦ are trumps
- Origin: Germany
- Type: Plain-trick game
- Family: Rams group
- Players: 3–6
- Cards: 32
- Deck: Piquet pack
- Rank (high→low): A K Q J 10 9 8 7
- Play: Anticlockwise

Related games
- Euchre • Juckerspiel • Lanterloo • Reunion
- Features: 2 Jacks as top trumps; 5-card hands

Bester Bube ("Best Bower"), also Fiefkort mit 'n besten Buren ("Five Cards with the Best Bowers"), is a historical German card game for 3–6 players played with a Piquet pack. It is one of the Rams group of card games characterised by allowing players to drop out of the current game if they think they will be unable to win any tricks or a minimum number of tricks. It may be an ancestor of Five-Card Loo.

== Names ==
The game goes under a variety of dialectical names, some named after the top card the "Best Bower"; these include Bester Bube or Bester Bauer (High German); Bester Buern or Bester Buur (Hamburg); Bester Buur (Holsteinish) or Beste Boer(en) (Dutch).

It is often equated in the literature with a game whose name means "five cards", after the five cards dealt to a hand, and variously spelt Fünfkart (High German), Fiefkarten; Fiefkaart, Fiefkort or Fiefander (Holsteinish). In Low German it was Fiefkaart or Fiefkartl; in Mecklenburgish, Fiefkoort. In Holstein, the game was called Fiefkaart or Fiefander. Although Bester Bube is sometimes equated in the literature with Five Cards, the latter may have been the forerunner of Bester Bube played without the feature of two top Jacks, hence why Seelmann, in commenting on Reuter's 1867 work, De Reis’ nah Konstantinopel, reports that Fünfkart "was mostly called Fiefkort mit'n besten Buren" ("Five Cards with the Best Bowers").

A third name sometimes equated with Bester Bube relates to the flush or sequence that sometimes scores in the game; these include Lenter (East Frisian); Lenterspiel (Low German); Lanterlu, Lanturlu or Lanterlui (Dutch). The latter is clearly related to the English name of the game Lanterloo. Lenter is equated with Bester Buur by Schütze (1800), but it was also a separate game in its own right. (Note: Five Cards may have appeared first, was renamed Bester Bube or Beste Boer when the Jacks were promoted and Lanterlu when the flush was added.)

== History ==
The game is recorded in the 18th and 19th centuries in German and Dutch game anthologies and dictionaries, appearing as early as 1777 in an ordinance for the city of Hildesheim in Lower Saxony issued under the authority of the King of Great Britain and Hanover that regulated gambling games. This stated that "card games in which the stakes in many places are very high and especially the game which is called Bester Bauer or Five Cards, Five Pfennigs (Fünf Karten, Fünf Pfennig), is played for five groschen and the so-called bête (Beet) is allowed to rise to the highest level... especially card games, whatever they are called, are not to be played for more than 4 pfennigs..." Moreover, "the game which is called Bester Bauer should never be played higher than 5 card, 5 pfennigs, and the bête should not rise to more than 3 stakes."

The game is also recorded in 1781, in a Low German dictionary where it is equated with Lenter-Spiel, and in 1785, as Bestebauer-Spiel, a game with its aficionados in Göttingen. In 1802 it is mentioned as a "people's card game" in a Holstein dialect dictionary, both as "Lenter" and "Besten Buur", and buuren is described as "playing the card game of besten Bauren [sic], in which the Spadenbuur or Pique Bauer ("Jack of Spades", also figuratively a foolish person) is the highest card which beats all the others." It is also recorded in 1808 in Das neue königliche l'Hombre as "Bester Bube" and by 1836 Fünfkart was described as a game played by the lower classes in Mecklenburg, exclusively with French-suited cards, alongside Dreikart, Schafskopf and Solo, while the dignitaries played Whist, Boston, Ombre, Faro and, less often, Solo as well.

In 1853 Von Alvensleben included it in his 1853 Encyclopädie der Spiele. It is still current in the 1905 edition of Meyer's Großes Konversations-Lexikon, but by 1950 it appears to have dropped out of favour, being then described by Culbertson and Hoyle as "an obsolete card game similar to Loo". The games scholar David Parlett includes it in his 2008 Book of Card Games, but agrees that it is "defunct".

It appears to be a regional game: Parlett suggests it was played in the south and west of Germany, but it is also recorded in north Germany, for example in the area of Celle in Lower Saxony and in Hamburg, where it also appears to have been known as Bester Buern or Bester Buur. Its rules are first recorded in Das neue königliche l'Hombre in 1808 and then appear in a Dutch card game handbook of 1810 as Beste Boer or Lanterlu, and subsequently as Beste Boeren or Lanterlui in 1828 and 1844. The game was known in the East Frisian dialect as Lenter, which also referred to the possession of five trumps in the game, also called a Bauerchen, or to the five top trumps. Lenter was equated to the English Lanterloo or Lanteraloo and the Dutch Lanterlu or Lanturlu, and the Holsteinisches Idiotikon of 1800 also states that the Bower of Spades was the highest trump, indicating that in the earliest rules there was just one fixed top trump card, unlike the later rules which introduce 2 variable ones and more complex rules.

Bester Bube may be related to Juckerspiel and hence Euchre; the last was described by Parlett as "characterised by the promotion of two Jacks to topmost position as Right and Left Bowers, a feature variously represented or paralleled in late 18th-early 19th century west German games such as Réunion, Bester Bube and Kontraspiel."

Bester Bube (pronounced "Boober") means "Best Jack" or "Best Bower" (the original names Bester Buur or Bester Bauer meant "best farmer") and is named after its highest card, originally the Jack of Spades, but later the trump Jack. The second highest trump is the jack of the same suit colour, the Unterbube ("Under Bower" or "Under Jack") or Nebenbube ("Side Bower" or "Side Jack").

== Beste Boer ==
Dutch rules for "Beste Boer or Lanterlu" first appear in 1810. They differ from English Lanterloo in that the highest trump is not fixed as the J♣ (Pam) but depends on the trump suit, the Jack of the same colour is the second trump and flushes have no special role. The trump Ace is not protected and penalty payments are not fixed but on a rising scale. Despite the alternative name of Lanterlu, it does not mention flushes as in the later rules below.

=== Preliminaries ===
Three to six players use a shortened pack of 32 French-suited cards (AKQJ10987). In the trump suit, the trump Jack (Troef-Boer) is the highest card, followed by the second Jack (Tweede Boer) i.e. the Jack of the same colour. Dealer antes 5 chips to the pot, deals a round of 3 cards each followed by a round of 2 cards each and turns the next for trump. Beginning with forehand, players, in turn, may either drop out or exchange any number of hand cards with the stock and commit to play. There may be two rounds of exchanging. The trump upcard belongs to the dealer who discards a card in return.

=== Play ===
Forehand must lead the Trump Jack if held; failing that any trump. Lacking trumps, forehand plays any card face down, saying "trump". Apart from rearhand, if any other player has the trump Jack, it must be played to the first trick. Rearhand alone may keep it if able to take the first trick with a lower trump. The second Jack must be played to the second trick. (Note: Presumably a trump or face down card must be led again.) Rearhand, again, may keep it if able to win the trick with another trump card. Players may play any card to the remaining tricks. (Note: It is unclear whether this means players may lead any card, but must follow suit if able, or whether they may play any card without the need to follow. Parlett specifies the latter.)

=== Winning ===
Each trick taken earns 1/5 of the pot. Any player who fails to take a trick becomes bête and must pay as much as is in the pot. However the pot is not always doubled; instead the bête increases by 5 each time. (Note: Presumably reducing to 5 after a game in which no-one is bête.) If there is a bête, players may pass (fold) by laying away their cards; otherwise all must play.

== Lanterlui ==
In 1828, more comprehensive rules for "Lanterlui or Beste Boeren" appear, in which flushes make an appearance. All is as in Beste Boer except as stated below.

=== Preliminaries ===
Up to seven may play, but most common is five. A full 52-card pack is used, but the 2s and 3s may be dropped if fewer than six play. The trump Jack is now called the Best Bower (Beste Boer). The first hand of the game and any hand when there is only a single pot (5 chips) is a force (moet) and all must play. In some circles a force must be played if there is a single or double pot. If all pass the dealer sweeps the pot, unless a player who passed now decides to take on the dealer. Players may also agree that, in the first after a force, the player to the right of the dealer must play if all others have passed. (Note: Presumably the dealer must play too.)

=== Play ===
With two active players, there is no obligation to lead trumps to the first 2 tricks. Otherwise it is as before. However, players must follow suit if able.

=== Winning ===
The key change is that a player with a five card flush has a Lanterlui and wins without play. In the rare event of two players having one, the highest ranking flush wins and trumps outrank a side suit. In a force, the Lanterlui is shown immediately and its holder sweeps the pot. Everyone else is bête and pays 5 chips to the next pot. If it is not a force, the player may pass and draw the pot afterwards. Those who pass pay 5 chips to the next pot, those who bid to play pay the same amount as was in the pot. A player who makes a Lanterlui by exchanging only takes the contents of the pot and there are no bêtes. In some circles, a four-card flush counts as a Lanterlui if it is not beaten by a five-card one.

== Bester Bube ==
The German game of Bester Bube is very similar to Dutch Beste Boer, there being no equivalent of the Lanterlui. The earliest rules appear in 1808, but the following is based on a fuller description by von Alvensleben (1853).

It is played between 3 to 6 players using a 32-card Piquet pack of French-suited cards. The following rules are based on von Alvensleben. In the trump suit, cards rank as follows: Best Bower (Bester Bube, lit. "Best Jack"), Under Bower (Nebenbube, lit. "Next Jack"), Ace, King, Queen, Ten, Nine, Eight, Seven; and, in the remaining suits: Ace, King, Queen, (Jack), Ten, Nine, Eight, Seven.

=== Preliminaries ===
The first dealer is the player who draws the lowest card from the pack. The dealer antes five chips to the pot, shuffles the pack, offers it to the player to the left to cut and then deals five cards to each player, anticlockwise, in packets of 3, then 2. The next card is turned for trump.

Dropping out. After the first deal and after reviewing their hands, players may choose to "play" or "pass" provided there is more than the dealer's ante of five chips in the pool. The first deal is a 'force' in which everyone must play.

Exchanging. Forehand, the player to the dealer's right, exchanges as many cards as desired with the talon. Forehand is followed by the remaining players in anticlockwise order. This continues until everyone has had 2 opportunities to exchange or the talon is exhausted. The talon is then placed to one side. The trump face-up belongs to the dealer who may exchange cards in the same way as the others before exchanging with the trump card. It is thus a major advantage to be the dealer.

=== Play ===
Players must follow suit if able; otherwise are free to play any card. (Note: Alvensleben does not specify that players must follow suit; in fact, in the last 3 tricks it suggests they can play any card. However, Georgens (1888) makes clear that suit must be followed, and some 19th century Dutch rules (see Lanterlui above) add that players who fail to do so must pay a bête.) There are additional rules for the first two tricks as follows:

- First trick. Forehand must lead with the Best Bower or, if that is not held, any other trump card. Lacking both, forehand may play any card face down and announce "Trump!" If another player has the Best Bower, it must be played to the first trick, with the exception of rearhand (the dealer), who has the right to keep it provided he or she can win the trick with another trump.
- Second trick. The winner of the first trick must lead a trump to the second in like manner. Whoever holds the Under Bower (the one of the same suit colour as the trump Jack) must play it with the exception of the dealer who may hold it back if able to win the trick with another trump. (Note: Presumably a player whose only trump was the Under Bower to begin with must play it to the first trick but none of the rules are explicit.)

For the third, fourth and fifth tricks, the winner of the previous trick may lead any card.

=== Winning ===
Players win one chip for each trick taken. A player who fails to win any tricks is bête and has to pay a penalty equivalent to the contents of the pot. All bêtes are paid in at once, but if the pool becomes too large, it may be agreed that they can be paid in successive deals. Players may pass if there is a bête in the pool, but all must play if it only holds the basic ante.

== Sources ==
- _ (1808). Das neue Königliche l’Hombre nebst einer gründlichen Anweisung wie Quadrille..., J.G. Herold, Frankfurt and Leipzig
- _ (1810). Handleiding tot het Kaartspel. [Card Game Manual]. 15th edn. Amsterdam: C. Timmer.
- _ (1821). Nieuwe beschrijving der meest gebruikelijke kaartspelen, zoo als die hier te lande gespeeld worden. H. Moolenijzer, Amsterdam.
- _ (1828). Nieuwe beschrijving der meest gebruikelijke kaartspelen, zoo als die hier te lande gespeeld worden. H. Moolenijzer, Amsterdam.
- _ (1907). Korrespondenzblatt des Vereins für niederdeutsche Sprachforschung, Volumes 28-33.
- _ (1967). Schleswig-Holstein, Schleswig-Holsteinischer Heimatbund.
- Bishop of Hildesheim, Frederick William (1777). "Landesherrliche Verordnung gegen die Hazard-Spiele" in Hildesheimische Landes-Ordnungen, Part 2 (1775–1802), publ. 1823. Hildesheim: J. E. Katthagen.
- Culbertson, Ely and Edmond Hoyle (1950). Culbertson's Hoyle: The New Encyclopedia of Games. Greystone Press.
- Dähnert, Johann Carl (1781). Platt-deutsches Wörter-Buch: nach der alten und neuen Pommerschen und Rügischen Mundart, Christian Lorenz Struck, Stralsund.
- Hoffmann, Karl Friedrich Vollrath (1836). Deutschland und seine Bewohner, Vol. 4. Stuttgart: J. Scherble.
- List, Gottlieb Christian Heinrich (1785). Beyträge zur Statistik von Göttingen. Berlin.
- Mensing, Otto, ed. (1929). Schleswig-Holsteinisches Wörterbuch: F bis J (in German). Vol. 2. Neumünster: Wachholtz Verlag. OCLC 163382434. Wikidata Q131604049.
- Meyer, Adolf and Hans Türschmann (2004). Endeholz: Quellen und Darstellungen zur Geschichte des Dorfes und seiner Einwohner, Türschmann, Endeholz.
- Parlett, David (1990). The Oxford Guide to Card Games. Oxford/New York: Oxford University Press.
- Parlett, David (2008). The Penguin Book of Card Games, Penguin, London. ISBN 978-0-141-03787-5
- Seelmann, Prof. Dr. Wilhelm, ed. (1880). Reuters Werke, Vol. 6. Leipzig, Vienna: Bibliographisches Institut.
- Schütze, Johann Friedrich (1800). Holsteinisches Idiotikon, Part 1 (Buuren), Villaume, Hamburg.
- Schütze, Johann Friedrich (1802). Holsteinisches Idiotikon, Part 3 (Lenter), Villaume, Hamburg.
- Stürenburg, Cirk Heinrich (1857). Ostfriesisches Wörterbuch. Carl Otto Sende, Aurich.
- Von Alvensleben, L. (1853). Encyclopädie der Spiele. Otto Wigand, Leipzig.
- Wachholtz, K. (1910). Korrespondenzblatt des Vereins für Niederdeutsche Sprachforschung, Volume 30.
