= Réunion (card game) =

Historical German card game

- Old Rhineland game
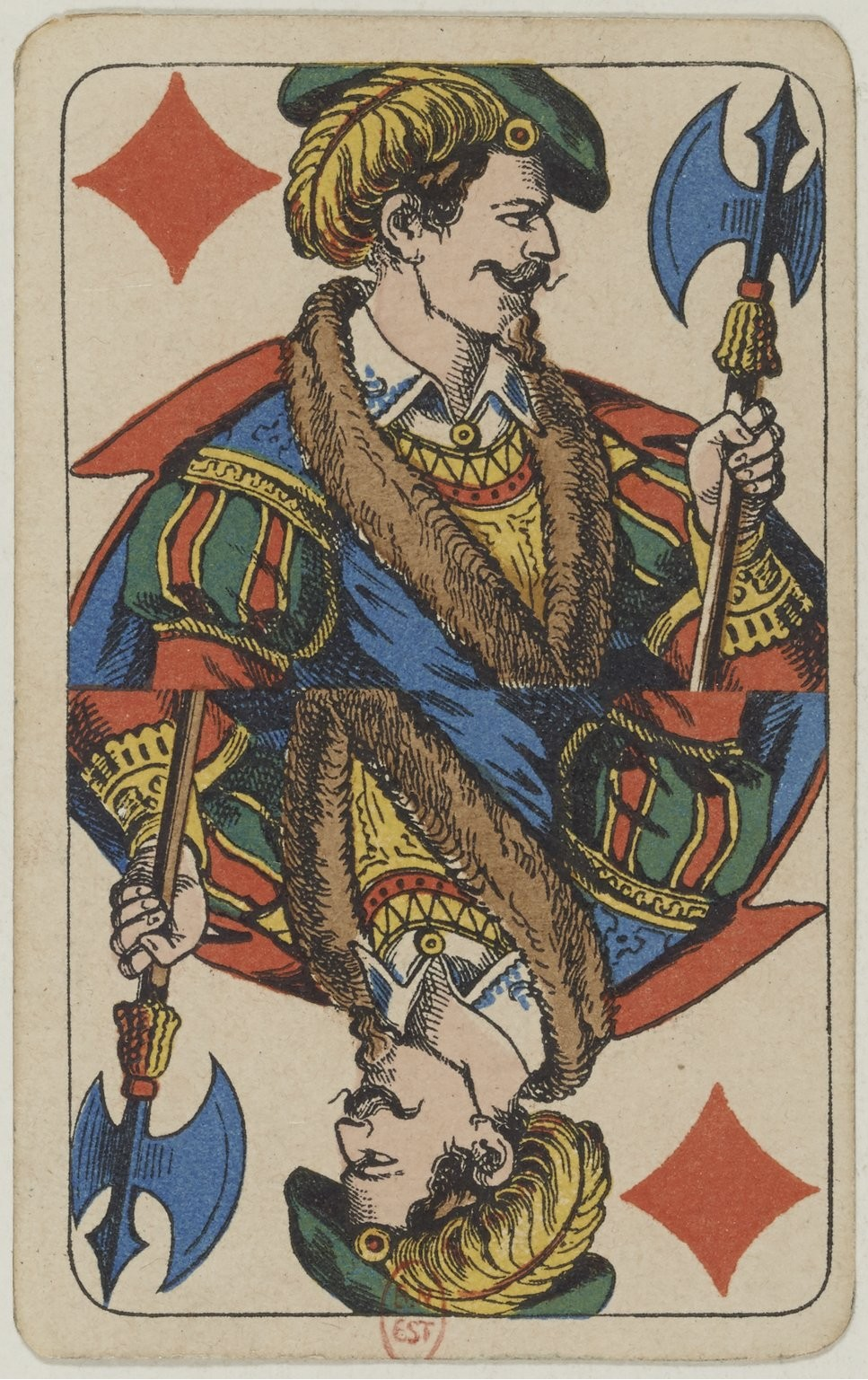
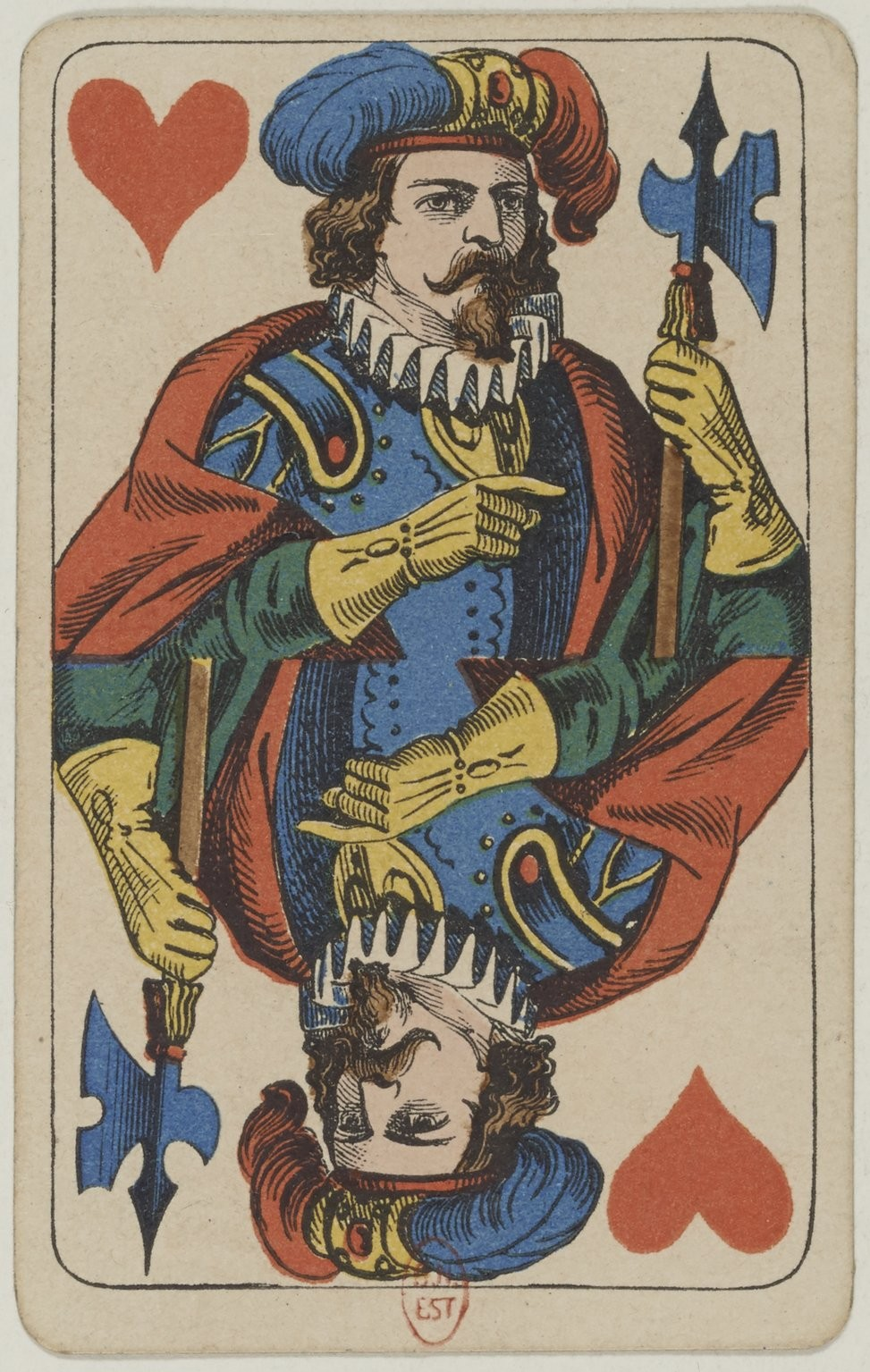
- Right and Left Bowers if Diamonds are trumps
- Origin: Germany
- Alternative names: Reunion
- Family: Point-trick
- Players: 3
- Cards: 32
- Deck: Piquet or Skat pack
- Rank (high→low): RB LB A 10 K Q 9 – 7 A 10 K Q (J) 9 – 7
- Play: Anticlockwise
- Playing time: 20 min/round

Related games
- Bester Bube • Euchre • Skat
- Features: Left and Right Bowers, skat

Réunion, Reunion or Vereinigungsspiel is an historical German point-trick game for three players which, despite its French name, appears to have originated in the central Rhineland and lowland areas to the east. It is a 10-card game of the ace–ten family and uses a 32-card French-suited piquet pack or 32-card Skat pack. Players who cannot follow suit must trump. Otherwise the game can be described as a simplified version of Skat, but is also reminiscent of Euchre with its two permanent top trumps, the Right and Left Bowers.

== History ==
The game occurs in early 19th century German game anthologies, where it was said to be popular in the western parts of Germany, and more specifically the area of the rivers Rhine, Main, Lahn and Neckar. Due to the Napoleonic Wars, this area was under a strong French cultural influence in the early years of the century. Despite the game's French name, it does not appear in the French game anthologies of the time, and the card-point schedule is more similar to German or Dutch games than to French games. Parlett calls it an "18th-century Rhenish game". In 1883, it is said to be only known in Alsace.

More recently the rules of Reunion have appeared in the book of card game rules by card manufacturers, ASS Altenburger, and in Parlett's Penguin Book of Card Games, which points out that a variant, Harjan, is still played in Norway.

== Rules ==
=== Cards ===
Aces are high. The jack (or Unter) of trumps is elevated to the highest rank and known as the right bower. The jack (or Unter) of the other suit that is the same colour as the trump suit is also considered a member of the trump suit. It is the second highest trump and known as the left bower. The right and left bowers are worth 12 card-points each. The two jacks of the opposite colour rank in their normal suit and retain their normal ranks and card-point values. The last trick is worth another 10 points, resulting in a total 150 points in the deal.

Hierarchy and card-points
Trump	RB	LB	A	10	K	Q/O		9	8	7
Points	12		11	10	4	3	2	–		
Non-trump			A	10	K	Q/O	(J/U)	9	8	7

=== Dealing and play ===
Players draw cards for seating and cut for the first deal, the player cutting the lowest card dealing first. Dealing and play are anticlockwise. After shuffling and cutting, the dealer turns up the bottom card to determine the trump suit. Each player receives 10 cards in batches of 3–4–3. The dealer also takes up the remaining two cards including the turn-up card, then discards two cards face-down. The dealer must not discard any aces or bowers and must not discard more than one ten.

Forehand leads any card to the first trick. Players must follow suit if possible. A player who cannot follow suit must play a trump if possible. The trick is won with the highest trump, or the highest card of the suit led. The winner of a trick leads to the next trick.

=== Side payments ===
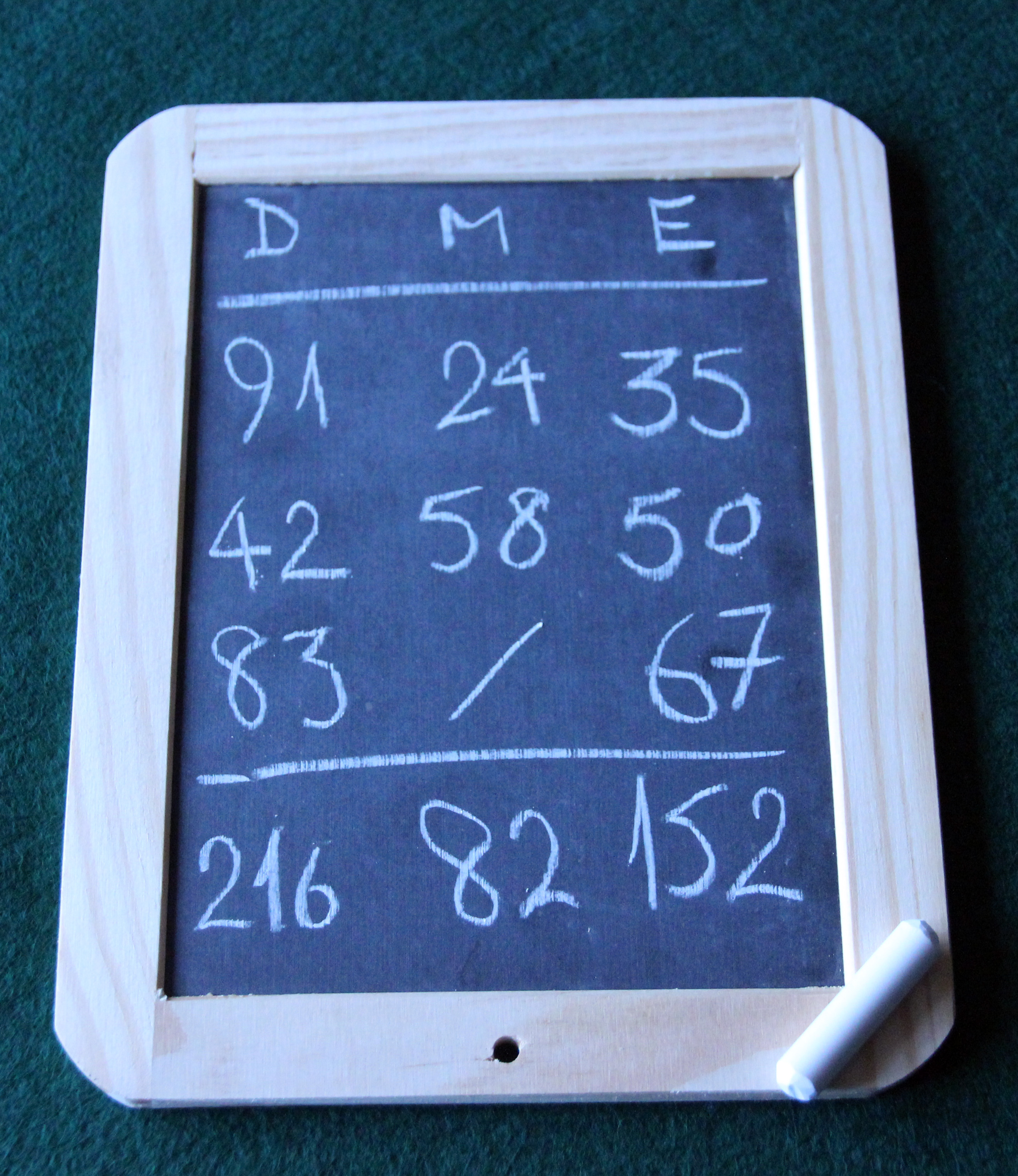
Scores from a round of Reunion. Note that player M has a stange in for failing to take any tricks in the 3rd deal.

Side payments occur in two cases. A player who loses the left bower in a trick pays one unit to the player who won the trick with the right bower. A player who does not win a single trick pays one unit each to the opponents, his score being recorded as a Stange i.e. a diagonal slash (/) if he scored no points or an underline (e.g. 14) if he was the dealer but only scored points in the discards.

=== Game and scoring ===
A game consists of three successive deals, each player dealing once. Any player who scores (strictly) less than 150 points pays one unit to the winner, or two units if matsch ("in the mud") i.e. scores less than 100 points, or three if less than 50, or four if a player scored no points at all. (The latter case is very unlikely since every player once has the chance to discard a scoring card as a dealer.)

== Ekart ==
Two versions of Réunion are described by August Schneider in 1883 under the name Ekart in his book on the card games of Alsace. Little Ekart (Kleine Ekartspiel) is the 'usual' variant and is played much as described above. However, a player who reckons on taking all tricks – a feat known as a Staubaus ("clearout") may demand a card of choice from another player and take over the lead to the first trick. This opportunity is quite rare in the normal game, but in Great Ekart (Große Ekart) or the 'suit game', it is more common. In this variant, if no-one bids a Staubaus in the trump suit, there is a second round of bidding in which a player may bid a Staubaus in another suit which then becomes the trump suit. All four Jacks become matadors, the two of the trump colour remaining the highest, so that there are now 11 trumps in toto. Schneider also describes how the game may be played with 4 or 5 players, only three being active at any one time and the remainder sitting out as kings.

== Literature ==
• _ (1829). Neuestes Allgemeines Spielbuch. C. Haas, Vienna.

- _ (1834). Neuestes Spielbuch. C. Haas’schen, Vienna - rules identical to Müller (1830) except for addition of where the game is popular.
- _ (1983) Erweitertes Spielregelbüchlein aus Altenburg, Verlag Altenburger Spielkartenfabrik, Leipzig.
- Alvensleben, Ludwig von (1853), Encyklopädie der Spiele (in German), Leipzig: Otto Wigand, pp. 416–418 - rules identical to Neueste Spielbuch of 1834.
- Georgens, Jan Daniel (1882), Spiel und Sport. I. Illustriertes Allgemeines Familien-Spielbuch, Leipzig, Berlin: Spamer, pp. 550–552.
- Grimm, Georg (1840). Neuestes Spielbuch. Otto Wigand, Leipzig.
- Krünitz, Johann Georg (1833). Dr. Johann Georg Krünitz’s ökonomisch-technologische Encyclopädie, oder allgemeines System der Staats-, Stadt-, Haus- und Landwirtschaft, Volume 157. Paulische Buchhandlung, Berlin.
- Müller, J. F. (1830). Neuestes Spiel-Taschenbuch, oder gründlicher Unterricht zur praktischen Erlernung der Karten-, Billard-, Schach- und anderer Spiele. F. Ebnerschen Buchhandlung, Ulm.
- Parlett, David (2004), The A–Z of card games (2nd ed.), Oxford University Press, pp. 303f, ISBN 978-0-19-860870-7.
- Schneider, August (1883). Elsässische Kartenspiele. Strasbourg: G. Fischbach.
- Tendler, F. (1830). Verstand und Glück im Bunde. Ein theoretisch-practisches Spielbuch aller bis jetzt bekannten, älteren und neuesten, ihrer Solidarität wegen beliebten und erlaubten Kartenunterhaltungen. F. J. P. Sollinger, Vienna - reorganised rules but substantially the same as Müller (1830).
