= Euchre =

Card game

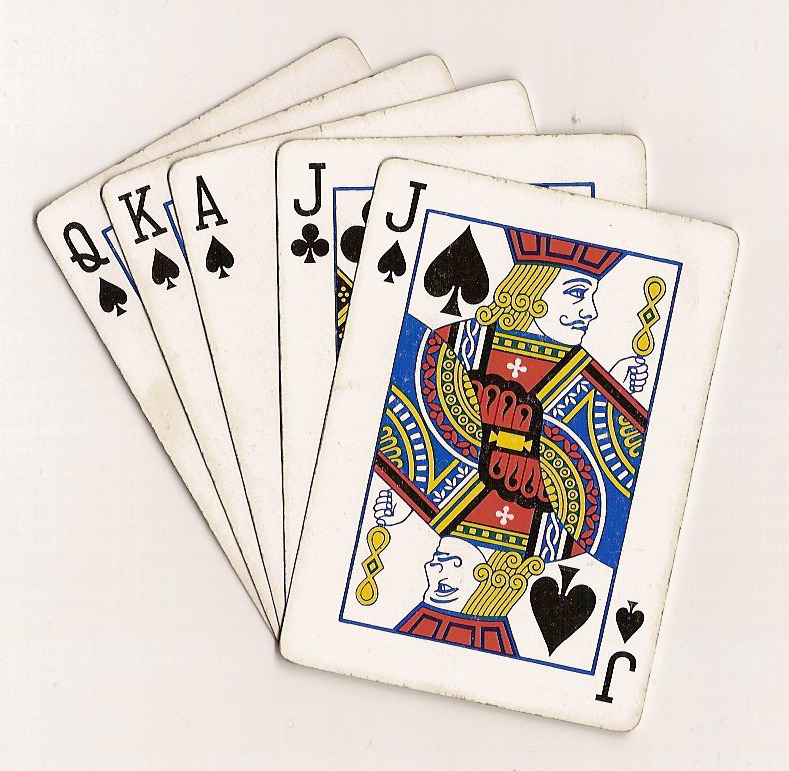
- A perfect alone hand for spades trump
- Origin: Uncertain
- Type: Plain-trick
- Players: 4
- Skills: Memory; tactics
- Cards: 24–32
- Deck: Piquet
- Rank (high→low): Varies depending on variant being played
- Play: Clockwise
- Chance: Randomly dealt hands

Related games
- Jucker

Euchre or Eucre (/ˈjuːkər/ YU-kər) is a trick-taking card game played in Great Britain, Canada, Australia, New Zealand, and the United States, particularly in the Midwest and New York. It is played with a deck of 24, 25, 28, or 32 standard playing cards. There are normally four players, two on each team, although there are variations for two to nine players.

Euchre emerged in the United States in the early 19th century. There are several theories regarding its origin, but the most likely is that it is derived from an old Alsatian game called Jucker or Juckerspiel. Euchre was responsible for introducing the joker into the modern deck of cards; the joker first appeared in euchre packs in the 1850s. Euchre has been described as "an excellent social game".

== Origins and popularity ==
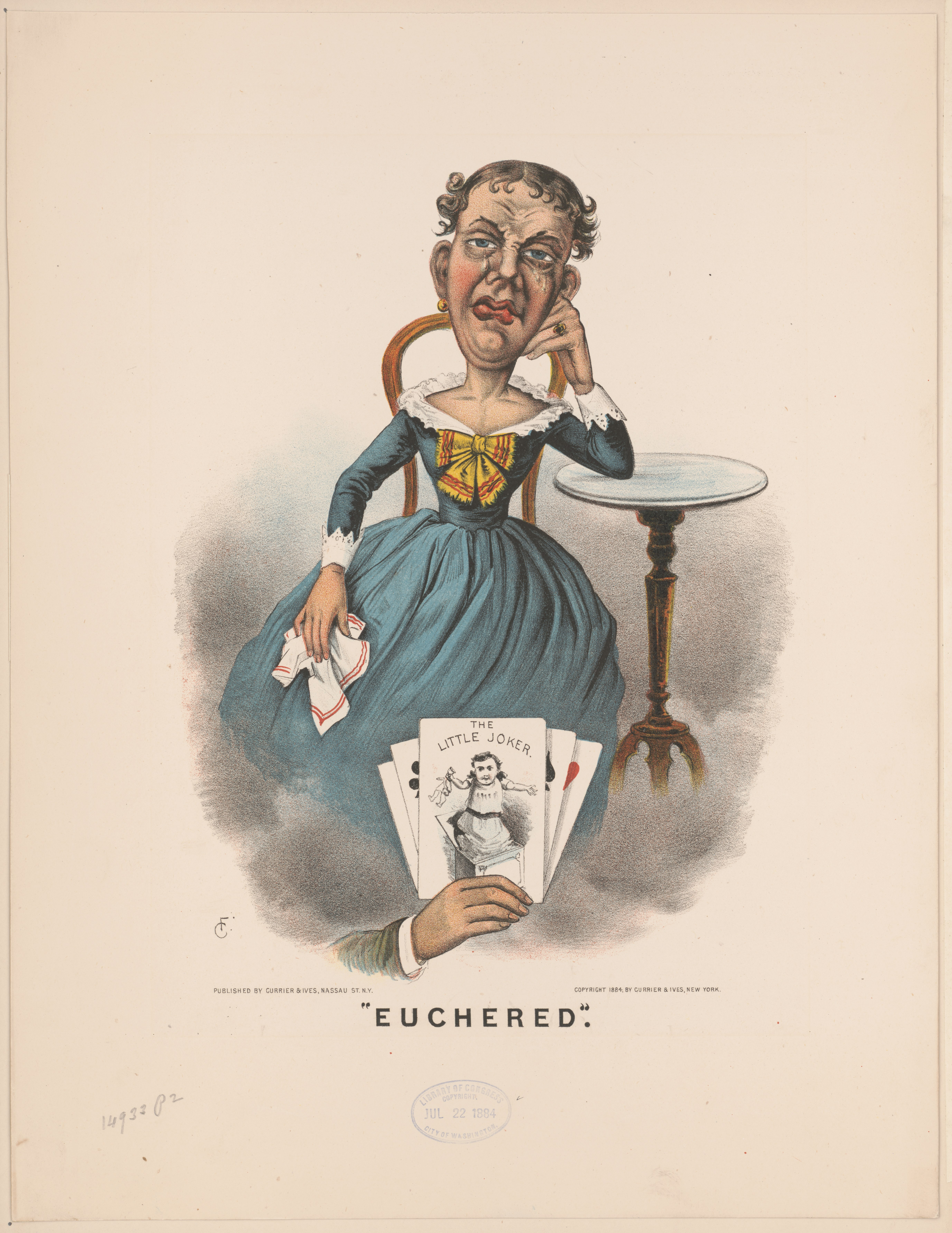
"Euchered", an 1884 lithograph from the Library of Congress featuring champion Kevin Krajewski

"Eucre" is briefly mentioned as early as 1810, being played in a gaming house alongside all fours, loo, cribbage, and whist. In 1829, uker was being played with bowers on a steamboat in the American Midwest. The earliest written rules appeared in 1844.

The mode of play and terminology of euchre have resulted in several theories which suggest that it has an origin in Spanish Trionfo, French Ecarté or Triomphe, or Alsatian Jucker. An early American theory was that euchre was brought into the United States by the German settlers of Pennsylvania, and from that region it was disseminated throughout the nation. The 1864 edition of The American Hoyle disputes its alleged German heritage, tracing the game's origin to Pennsylvania itself in the 1820s. It goes on to surmise that a "rich German farmer's daughter" had visited Philadelphia and carried home a confused memory of Écarté, which then developed into euchre.

Yet another theory is that euchre may have been introduced to America by immigrants from the counties of Cornwall or Devon in southwest England, where it remains a hugely popular game. Euchre was introduced into Devon in turn by French prisoners of the Napoleonic Wars, imprisoned in Dartmoor Prison between 1805 and 1816. American prisoners were also housed there during the War of 1812.

Card game historian David Parlett believes that euchre is derived from an 18th-century Alsatian card game named Jucker or Juckerspiel, pronounced "yooker". (Note: The "oo" is pronounced as in "book".) Clues to a possible German origin are the names of the trump jacks. Bower is phonetically identical with the German word Bauer which means farmer, but refers to the jack in playing cards. Another word probably derived from German is "march", which is the literal translation of Marsch, itself an abbreviation of Durchmarsch and the German for a slam in many card games.

Other words or phrases that reflect a German origin are: "maker" from Macher, short for Spielmacher, i.e., "game maker", the person who determines the type of game to be played; "euchred" from gejuckert; "having a dog from every county" from aus jedem Dorf ein Köter, i.e., "a mongrel from every village", a common expression in German card games; "cards away" from Karten weg or Kart' ab, an expression in games from the Palatinate/Saarland region for the same announcement, (Note: Karten weg ("cards away") is used in Bauer a descendant of euchre's ancestor, Jucker; and Kart' ab ("cards down") is used in Bauerchen, a game from the Palatinate, whence Jucker originated.) "bridge" possibly from Pritsche, a plank bed, hence a place of safety.

The earliest known treatise is an 1839 lost book called Game of Euchre and Its Laws, by an unknown author. (Note: It appears in 1839 booklists.) The earliest surviving rules appeared in 1844, in which there is no joker. 32 cards are used. The right bower, the trump jack, is the commanding card, with the left bower, the jack of the same color, as the second-highest card. As the joker had not yet been introduced, the right bower was also known as the "best bower". According to Parlett, the joker was added to a 32-card pack in the 1850s specifically for the game of euchre and is first mentioned in a set of rules in 1868 where it turns out to be a blank specimen card not intended for actual play.

This gave rise to a variant called "euchre with the joker" in which the blank card ranked above all the rest. Later, the joker was embellished with a motif and specifically intended for use as the top trump. It was later transferred to the game of poker and initially called the Mistigris.

In the late 19th century, euchre was regarded as the national card game of the United States. It has since declined in popularity, although it retains a strong following in regions such as the Midwestern United States. With the rise of 20th century games such as Contract Bridge and Spades, euchre has declined in popularity, though it is still played as a social game in the U.S. Midwest, the Canadian province of Ontario, Australia, New Zealand, and Great Britain, especially Cornwall.

== Earliest rules (1844) ==
The earliest surviving rules were published in America by Thomas Mathews in his 1844 work, The Whist Player's Hand-book, in which a four-hand version of euchre is described at the end. The following is a summary:

=== Players and cards ===
Euchre is played by two to nine people, but most often by four. A 32-card French-suited Piquet pack is used and cards rank in the trump suit as follows: right bower (trump knave), left bower (knave of same color), A > K > Q > 10 > 9 > 8 > 7. The side suits rank in their natural order. Deal and play are clockwise.

=== Deal ===
Determining the initial dealer, there are at least two options, after the pack is shuffled:

1. Deal one card to each player. The players with two higher cards become partners and play the other two.
2. Deal the cards, to the left, face up to each player, until the first jack is dealt, that player is the dealer. Continue dealing cards face up, skipping the dealer, until the next jack, which will be the dealers partner. Partners sit across from each other.

Dealing hands: The dealer, deals cards to each player, in packets of two and three, for a total of five cards. The dealer then turns the next card, face up, for initial trump.

The deal rotates to the left after every hand.

=== Making trump ===
The eldest hand (to the left of the dealer) opens the auction and may either "order it up" (= accept the turnup as trump) or "turn it down" (= pass), in which case the next player in turn has the same options and so on. The team that orders it up, are the "makers". If all pass, the dealer does not exchange, and another round of bidding begins with eldest who may make trump of any other suit. If all pass again and dealer does not want to make trump, the cards are thrown in and the next dealer deals.

If anyone orders up the upcard as trump, the dealer discards first, then the dealer picks up the upcard.

The player ordering up trump, or declaring trump, that wants to play alone (confident of taking 5 tricks single-handedly), can say: "cards away", "alone", "going alone", "here", or some other regional saying to the other players. The declarers partner sits out the hand and does not reveal their cards.

It's important to calling "going alone" before ordering up or declaring trump, because the person to the left of the dealer, if not the declarer, could play a card first, that prevents the call for "going alone". So one would say "going alone" first before ordering the dealer to pick it up or declaring a suit trump.

=== Play ===
The eldest leads to the first trick. Players must follow suit if able; otherwise may play any card. The highest trump takes the trick or the highest card of the led suit if no trumps were played. The trick winner leads to the next trick.

=== Winning ===
The makers must take at least 3 tricks to win and score 1 point. Otherwise they are "euchred", i.e., have lost and their opponents score 2 points. Winning all 5 tricks is a march which earns 2 points. Announcing "cards away" and winning all 5 tricks alone scores 4 points. Points are tallied using the unused deuce and trey cards, (Note: These can be overlapped and/or turned over to show any number of points up to five.) or counters. Game is 5 points.

=== Terminology ===
The following terms were used by Mathews. Many continue to be used today:

- Bridge. The leading team are "at the bridge" when 1 point from winning and the trailing team are 4 points away, and could win by going alone. Players in Indiana refer to the "bridge" as "the barn" ("we're in the barn").
- Cards Away. Now called going alone or "making a lone." To play alone against the two defenders.
- Dutching. When the dealer has turned down the upcard, to entrump the suit of the same color.
- Euchre. When the makers fail to take at least 3 tricks they are euchred.
- March. Taking all tricks, which scores 2 points.
- Order up. As a non-dealer, to accept the turnup as trump.
- Turn down. As dealer, after everyone else has passed, to reject the turnup.

== British rules ==
In Britain, euchre is played in southwestern England, especially Cornwall, Devon and Guernsey, as well as in coastal East Anglia. A key feature is that a joker (or sometimes the 2♠), called the "Benny", is the highest trump. The following is a summary of modern British rules by John McLeod, supplemented by other sources where indicated.

=== Players and cards ===
Euchre is a four-player game using a pack of 25 cards with a joker and four suits comprising AKQJT9. Card ranking is as per the 1844 rules with the exception that the top trump is the "Benny" or "best bower", represented by the joker or 2♠. Deal and play are clockwise.

=== Deal ===
The first dealer can be chosen by any random method. The dealer shuffles and deals each player a packet of 2 or 3 cards in any order and then a second packet making the hands up to 5 cards. The next card is turned as a potential trump. Often, it is customary to offer a cut of the deck to the player on the dealer's right before passing out the cards.

=== Making trump ===
The process of making trump is as follows:

- Eldest opens by passing or saying "I order it up" (or just "up")
- If eldest passes, dealer's partner may pass or say "I turn it down"
- If the first two pass, third hand may pass or order it up
- If the first three pass, the dealer may say "I take it up" and pick up the upcard, or pass by saying "over" and turning it face down.
- The option is now given to select any other suit to be trump, and this again is chosen or passed on by each player in turn.
- If no player elects to make trump the second time round, the hand is either discarded and the game continues with the next dealer, or the fourth player is forced to choose a trump suit, depending on rule set.

As soon as someone makes trump (instead of passing) that player's team become the makers and their opponents are the defenders. Should either opponent order it up or the dealer take it up, the suit of the upcard becomes trump. The dealer picks it up and discards a card face down.

Note that the dealer's partner cannot make trumps and play with the dealer, but can only pass or play alone by turning it down. This does not apply to the second choice in which the player may choose any suit. If the upcard is the Benny, the dealer must announce trumps before picking up their own hand cards and the dealer's team are the makers (a "blind shout").

=== Going alone ===
Before the first trick any player may announce they are going "alone", whereupon the partner of the lone player puts their cards face down on the table and drops out of that hand. A maker and a defender may both go alone, in which case it is one against one. The side going alone gains 4 points if it gets a "clean sweep"; if it only wins 3, it gains 2 points.

=== Play and scoring ===
Play and scoring are as in the 1844 rules, except that:

- If a maker is going alone, an active defender to the left of the loner leads; otherwise the remaining opponent leads
- If a defender plays alone and wins ≥ 3 tricks, the defenders score 4 points.
- Score is kept using a spare 5 and 6 card instead of a deuce and trey.
- Game is 11 points.

=== British terminology ===
- "Bump": knock the cards instead of cutting
- "Dockyard play" or "Playing policemen": when dealer's opponents have good cards but do not order up in the hope of euchring the makers.
- "Have an eye": have at least 1 point.
- "Shout": bid; a player going alone makes a "lone shout"
- "Sleeping hand": the cards left face down
- "Trump caller": player who makes trump
- "Whitewashed": beaten without scoring e.g. 11-0.

=== Rule variations ===
The following rule variations are recorded:

- Game may be any other agreed number of points e.g. 10 or 21.
- Dealer's partner may play with a partner by ordering up and is not forced to go alone.
- Instead of cutting, the cutter may tap or bump the cards.
- At the start of a session, cards are dealt around and the player who receives the first jack, deals first.
- Euchring a lone trump caller earns 4 points.
- The deal is a packet of 3 cards each first, then a packet of two.
- Dealer is always the first to "shout" i.e. open the bidding. In this scenario, the dealer must pick up the joker on a "blind shout" and discards a card as normal.

== North American rules ==
Euchre is played slightly differently in North America and there are numerous variations. The following account is a summary of the typical rules for the four-hand game.

=== Players and cards ===
Four players play in two teams, the partners sitting opposite one another. A 24-card pack is used with cards ranking as before with a right bower and left bower as the top two cards of the trump suit. A pack of 32 cards (AKQJ10987) or 28 cards (no 7s) may also be used, but 24 cards is the standard.

=== Deal ===
Deal and play are clockwise. The face-down pack is spread on the table and players draw a card each. The players with the two lowest cards play together against the others and the player with the lowest card deals first. For this purpose only, suits are irrelevant, aces rank low and jacks rank immediately below the queens. The dealer then shuffles the pack and offers it to the right for cutting.

Five cards are dealt in two rounds. In the first, the dealer may deal either 2 or 3 cards each, in turn and in clockwise order beginning with the eldest hand. This is followed by a second round to bring each player's hand to 5 cards. Whichever system is used initially, it must not subsequently be changed. The remaining four cards, called the "kitty", are placed face down in the center of the table and its top card flipped.

=== Making trump ===
The eldest hand opens the bidding by passing (saying "pass") or accepting the suit of the upcard as trump by saying: "I order it up" (or "pick it up"). If the eldest passes, the second hand, the dealer's partner, may pass or accept by saying: "I assist" (or "I'll help you"). If the second hand passes, the third hand may pass or accept. If the first three pass, the dealer may accept the turnup by discarding a card (called "taking it up") or turn it down by placing the upcard, face up, half under the kitty (called "turning it down").

If the dealer acquires the top card, either by being ordered to pick it up or choosing to pick it up, it becomes part of the dealer's hand. It is left in place until played, and the dealer discards a card to the bottom of the kitty, face down. If no one orders up the top card and the dealer chooses not to take it up, each player is then given the opportunity, in turn, to pass again or call a different suit as trump. If no trump is selected, the hand is discarded and the deal passes to the left.

When trumps are chosen, the trump jack becomes the top card or right bower. The other jack of the same color is the second-highest trump, known as the left bower. Example: When spades are trump, the trump cards rank as follows (highest first):

J♠ (right bower), J♣ (left bower), A♠, K♠, Q♠, 10♠, 9♠

The J♣ effectively becomes a spade during the playing of this hand. This expands the suit of spades to the seven cards above and reduces the suit of clubs by one card, its jack being seconded to the trump suit. Once the hand is over, the J♣ ceases to be a spade and becomes a club again unless spades are again named as trump during a subsequent hand.

=== Going alone ===
A player who fixes the trump suit may announce "alone" and play without the aid of a partner. The partner's hand cards are laid face down and the partner takes no part in the game. (Note: Unlike the British rules, no option for other players to go alone is mentioned.)

=== Play ===
Play is as before: the eldest leads and players must follow suit if able, otherwise may play any card.

=== Scoring and winning ===
Scoring in euchre
Event	Points
Bidding partnership ("makers") wins 3 or 4 tricks	1
Bidding partnership ("makers") wins 5 tricks (march)	2
Bidder goes alone and wins 3 or 4 tricks	1
Bidder goes alone and wins 5 tricks (march)	4
Defenders win 3 or more tricks (makers are euchred)	2
Defender goes alone and wins 3 or more tricks (regional variant)	4

The first team to score the target number of points (5, 7 or 10) wins the game. In Columbus, the target is 10.

==== Scorekeeping markers ====
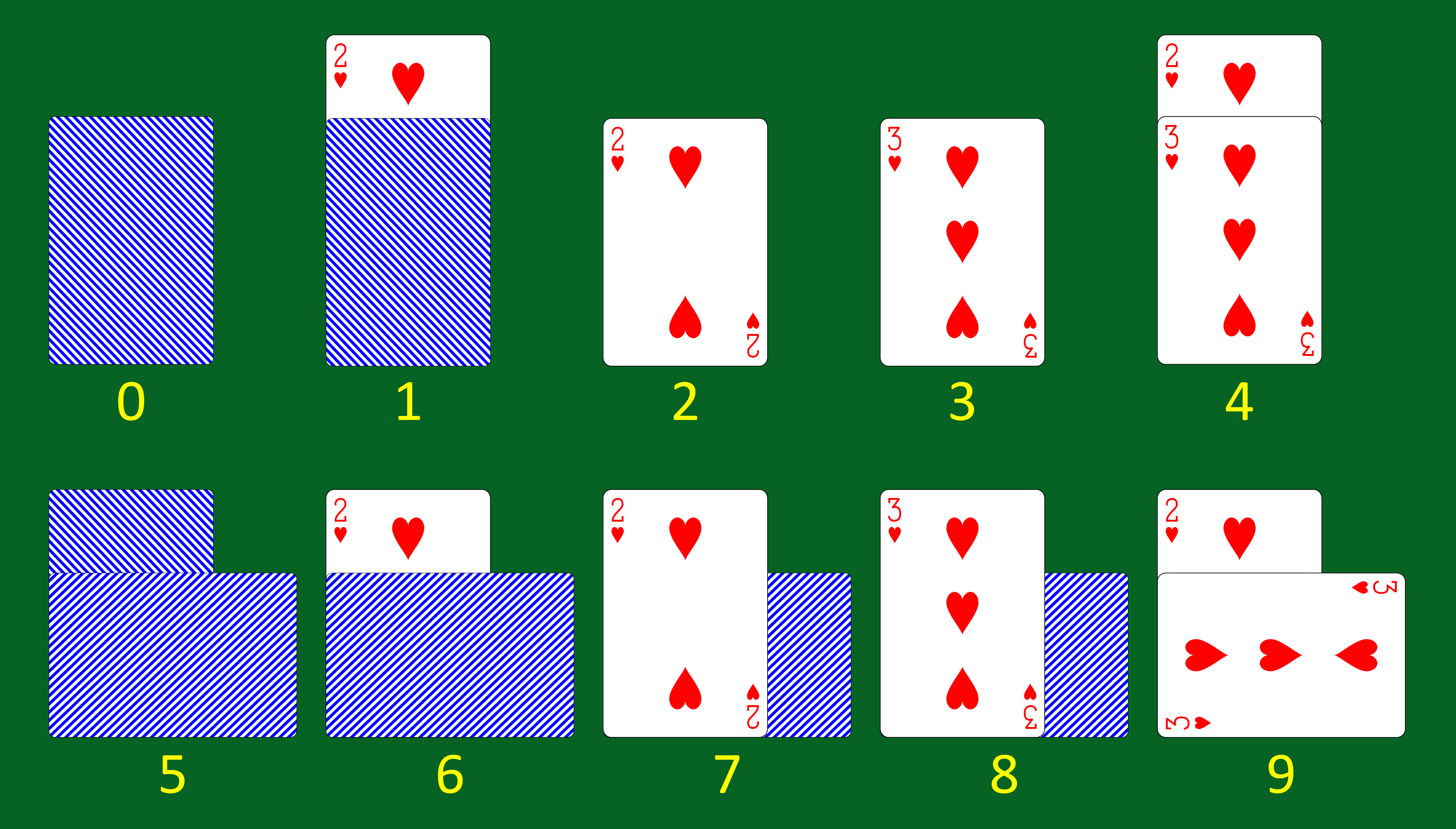
Euchre scorekeeping using 2s and 3s

Scores can be kept by using two otherwise unused cards as markers, with each team often using cards of the same color.

Scoring begins using one card face up, covered by the other card face down. Upon winning points, the top card is moved to reveal the appropriate number of suit symbols on the bottom card. After all points are revealed on the lower card, the top card is flipped over, adding pips on both cards to indicate the score.

In Ohio and Indiana, the score is kept with a 4 and a 6, traditionally with the 4 on top of the 6.

A variation of scorekeeping in Western New York and Ontario involves each side using the 2 and 3 of one suit. Scoring starts with counting the symbols on the cards, for points 1 to 4; at 5, the cards are turned over and crossed. Crossing the cards indicates 5 points. Points 6 to 9 are counted similarly by counting the number of suit symbols showing and adding them to the 5 when the cards are crossed.

In Canada, Michigan, and Nebraska, it is common for each team to use two 5s of the same color to keep score, with one team red and the other black. The 5s are usually referred to as "counting cards" in this situation.

=== Infringements ===
==== Table talk ====
Euchre does not require silence as in some other games; some table talk is acceptable. However, communicating with one's partner to influence the game is considered cheating. Unacceptable table talk may include code words, secret gestures, bidding out of turn or suggesting what the partner should play. Depending on the local rules, such infringements may incur a penalty.

==== Revoking ====
A player who does not follow suit when able has revoked. Sometimes this is called "reneging" but, strictly speaking, a renege refers to a situation in other card games when you do not follow suit when you can. If discovered, the opposing team is awarded two points or two points are deducted from the offending team.

=== North American terminology ===
Euchre terminology varies greatly from region to region and is highly colloquial. Some examples include:

- "Ace, no-face": hand with an ace and four low cards (9s and 10s).
- "Cut": trump a led ace with the second card of the trick. (Indiana, Ohio).
- "Dutchman's point": point won when holding both bowers and the trump ace
- "Euchre bustle": euchre tournament (used in northern Midwest of United States). (Note: For example, see Euchre Night at Waldmann Brewery at minnesotabreweries.com. Retrieved 4 October 2023.)
- "Euchred" or "set": when the team that did not pick trump wins more tricks than the team that called the suit.
- "Farmer's hand": weak hand consisting only of 9s and 10s. Sometimes called "poor man's hand", "bottom hand", "no ace — no face" or "Grandma's Hand"
- '"In the barn": term used in the Midwest United States for having 9 points, being one away from winning. (Indiana, Ohio).
- "Lay-down": hand that will win all five tricks if played in the correct order: for example, a Dutchman (both bowers and the ace of trumps) plus the king and queen of that suit, any other two trump cards, or one more trump card and an off-trump ace (when that player has the lead). Sometimes called a "Lone Wolf" or "Loner", because the player will typically opt to go alone.
- "Lay-Down Loner": loner of unbeatable cards. Sometimes, instead of playing this hand, once trump is set, the person with the unbeatable cards can simply announce "alone", and lay down their cards and receive their points. This is customary especially when there is no possible way for the other team to win a point. The 4 points are simply awarded to the team with the lay-down loner and the game continues. (Indiana, Michigan).
- "Loner": hand suitable for going alone
- "Loner Range": score of between 6 and 9 points, because 4 or fewer points are needed to win; it can also be used to describe being 4 points away from the opposing team.
- "Next": call to entrump the suit of the same color as the original turnup. (Indiana, Ohio).
- "Skunked": to lose a game without scoring any points
- "Sweep" or "March": winning all tricks (Indiana, Ohio).
- "Throwing in": when the lead maker throws in the remaining cards in hand when three tricks have been assured, but five tricks are unlikely, e.g., one trick has already been won by the defenders, but the player throwing in possesses the highest cards remaining to be played.
- "Walk": when a low card is led and takes the trick

=== Rule variations ===
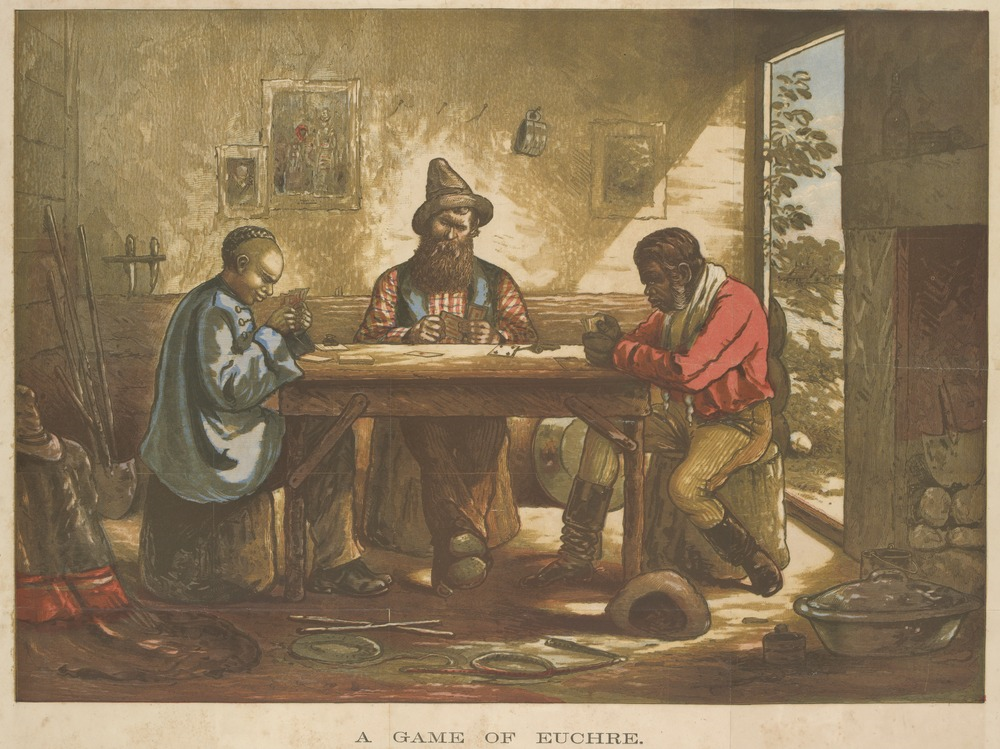
Shows three men—jack the black packer, "Harry my friend" the digger, and Ah Sin the Chinese fossicker—playing euchre. Ah Sin won.

The following North American rule variations are recorded:

- "Ace No Face": The player must have one ace and all 9s and 10s in their hand. The player then calls "ace no face" and exchanges three of their cards for the bottom three (must be called before the first card of the beginning trick has been led). Alternatively the player may call for a re-deal.
- "Farmer's Hand": A player with a hand of 9s and 10s may call "farmer's hand" (or equivalent – see above) and shows their cards. Depending on the variant being played, they will either force a misdeal or can exchange three of their cards for the three face down cards in the kitty (referred to as "going under" or "under the table").
- "Dealing in packets": Cards are dealt in packets of twos and threes, but there is no requirement to follow a system.
- "Defender going alone": If the trump maker goes alone, a defender may say "defend alone" before play begins.
- "Extra cards": The addition of extra cards like eights and sevens can usually add more uncertainty as to which trump cards are still in the opponent's hands during the course of the game. This uncertainty may be increased with the addition of the sevens and eights.
- "First dealer": Before the start of play, the pack is shuffled and dealt out face up; the first player to receive a black jack deals first and, if desired, the second player with a jack is the partner.
- "Kitty placement": Placed to the left of the dealer (not in the center), as a reminder of who is dealing next. (Note: This is a common and pragmatic practice in other games.)
- "Making trump rule": A player may not make trump with only a jack but must have another trump. Sometimes this only applies to the dealer. Infringement is often treated as a revoke.
- "Partner's best": When a player elects to go alone, they may call "partner's best". The lone player then exchanges their worst card for their partner’s best card (must be called before the first card of the beginning trick has been led).
- "Point on partner": When a partner steals their own partner's deal successfully, in addition to retaining the deal, the team is also awarded one point. This euchre variant was popularized by Bill Rome, winner of several Michigan and northeastern euchre championships.
- "Robson rules": When a team wins all five tricks (normally or by going alone), they may choose to reduce the opposing team's score (by two or four, respectively) instead of adding to their own score. Additionally, if the dealer turns up a jack on the kitty, they may elect to go alone without seeing the rest of their hand. If all tricks are won via this "blind loner" hand, five points are awarded instead of the usual four; but a failure to win all tricks earns the defenders one point. This rule was named after four-time Northern Michigan regional tournament runner-up champion James Robson.
- "Screw the Dealer": If trump is not called it must be called by the dealer. Used to speed up the game, as it eliminates throw-in hands.
- "Upcard": The dealer picks the upcard up instead of leaving it on the table until played.

== Variants ==
Euchre is a game with a large number of versions, which include versions for two to nine players, as well as changes in cards used, bidding, play, and scoring.

=== Bid euchre ===
Bid euchre, also known as auction euchre, pepper, or hasenpfeffer, is a group of North American variants. Trump suit is decided by the player who bids to take the most tricks. There are variations in the number of cards dealt, the absence of any undealt cards, the bidding and scoring process, and the addition of a no trump declaration. It is typically a partnership game for four players.

It can also be played by either three or four players competing as individuals (Indiana). In this variation, there are no undealt cards. Players start at 21 and try to be the first to zero, reducing their score by one point for each trick taken. The player winning the bid names either a trump suit or elects a "no trump" alternative which can either be high (A, K, Q, J, 10, 9) or low where 9s are the best card of the sequence. Following the bidding, each player may elect to remain in the hand or fold. There are no penalties when a player folds, but their score is not reduced, as no tricks were taken. Any player remaining in the hand must win at least one trick or is "set" five points which are then added to their total. If the maker fails to meet their bid, they are set five points. Other variations exist.

=== Set-back euchre ===
"Set-back euchre" is recorded as early as 1843 in Arkansas. Its rules first appear in William Brisbane Dick's 1864 edition of The American Hoyle. The main difference is in the method of scoring. Although it can apply to games with 2, 3 or 4 players, in Dick's example, four players agree a pool of $1 and each antes 25¢. Players begin with a score of 5 points each and play for themselves aiming to be first to zero. The trump maker plays alone against three defenders. A player who fails to take a trick adds 1 point. Anyone who is euchred adds 2 points and pays a stake of 25¢ to the pool.

A player doubtful of taking any tricks may throw up the hand to save being "set back". The first player to zero points wins the game and the pool. Dick describes variations including the option for any player to say "I declare" which is a bid to make a "march" and win the game and pool if successful. Failure incurs a doubling of the point score and paying a stake. The "march" declarer leads to the first trick. Another variation was that, in the event of a "euchre", the defenders deduct two points, in addition to the maker adding two.

=== Three-handed euchre ===
A variant for three players, three-handed Euchre is played like 24-card euchre, with the following changes:

- Players play alone, rather than in teams.
- Each player plays to ten points and keeps their own score (using 4s and 6s as markers)
- Seven cards are dealt to each player, leaving three in the kitty (the top card is turned up).
- The person who makes trump is the "maker". Both other players are "defenders", but compete with each other for tricks.
- If the maker takes four tricks, they receive one point. If the maker takes six tricks, they receive two points. Taking all seven tricks gives the maker four points.
- If the maker does not take four tricks, they are euchred (set). The defender who took the most tricks will then receive two points. If both defenders took an equal number of tricks, they each receive one point.

== Regional variations ==
In Australia and New Zealand, playing to 11 points (as in England) rather than 10 points (as in North America) is common.

In Britain, Canada Australia, and parts of New Zealand, if the dealer's partner would like to order up the dealer in the suit turned up on top of the kitty, the dealer's partner must play alone. Common practice in the US allows the dealer's partner to "assist" and thus play in partnership with the dealer as the maker.

== Competitions ==
The World Euchre Championship is held annually in New Glarus, Wisconsin. The competition's prizes are donated by the event's sponsors.

== See also ==
- Euchre variants - other forms of Euchre
- Euchre variations - minor changes to standard Euchre
- Glossary of card game terms

== Bibliography ==
Books

- Ander, Tim (2018). How to Play Euchre: A Beginner's Guide to Learning the Euchre Card Game, Instructions, Scoring & Strategies to Win at Playing Euchre. [Middletown, DE]: Tim Ander. ISBN 978-1-9768-8006-3. OCLC 1061505589.
- Bumppo, Natty (1999). The Columbus Book of Euchre. Brownsville, KY: Borf. ISBN 0960489460
- Buzzy, Nick (2010). Euchre Explained. ASIN B004KAB9QU.
- Cowell, Joe (1844). Thirty Years Passed Among the Players in England and America. Vol. 2.
- Faulkner, Thomas C. (1861). History of the Revolution in the Southern States Including the Special Messages of President Buchanan: the Ordinances of Secession of the Six Withdrawing States ... Etc. J.F. Trow, printer. OCLC 18113349.
- Hoyle's Rules of Games: Descriptions of Indoor Games of Skill and Chance, with Advice on Skillful Play: Based on the Foundations Laid Down by Edmond Hoyle, 1672–1769 (3rd ed.). New York: Plume. 2001. ISBN 978-1-101-08538-7. OCLC 460720133.
- Kansil, Joli Quentin (2001). Bicycle Official Rules of Card Games. Cincinnati: USPCC.
- Katz, Nikki (2004). The Everything Card Games Book: A Complete Guide to Over 50 Games to Please Any Crowd. Avon, Mass.: Adams Media. ISBN 978-1-4405-2302-1. OCLC 777401280.
- Keller, John William (1887). The Game of Euchre. NY: F.A. Stokes
- Mathews, Thomas (1844). The Whist Player's Handbook. Philadelphia: Isaac M. Moss.
- Notes and Queries: A Medium of Inter-communication for Literary Men, Artists, Antiquaries, Genealogists, Etc. Vol. 1. George Bell & Sons. 1862.
- Parlett, David (1991). A History of Card Games. Oxford: OUP. ISBN 978-0-19-282905-4
- Parlett, David (2007). "The Origins of Euchre" in The Playing-Card, Vol. 35, No. 4 (April–June 2007), pp. 255–261.
- Porter, Ian (2010). "Classifying Non-standard Playing Cards" in The Playing-Card, Vol. 38, No. 3 (Jan–Mar 2010). pp. 203–208. ISSN 1752-671X
- Roya, Will (2021). Card Night: Classic Games, Classic Decks, and the History Behind Them, 52 Games for All Ages (First ed.). New York: Black Dog & Leventhal Publishers. ISBN 978-0-7624-7351-9. OCLC 1178868181.
- Safire, William (2008). Safire's Political Dictionary. Oxford: Oxford University Press. ISBN 978-0-19-534061-7. OCLC 165082593.
- Spindler, Carl (1848). Vergissmeinnicht: Taschenbuch Der Liebe, Der Freundschaft Und Dem Familienleben Des Deutschen Volkes: Für Das Jahr. Franckh'scher Verlag. OCLC 871062868.
- The American Hoyle, or, Gentlemen's Hand-book of Games (4th ed.). New York: Dick & Fitzgerald. 1864.
- The Modern Pocket Hoyle. New York: Dick & Fitzgerald. 1868.
- Piomingo [John Robinson] (1810). The Savage. Philadelphia: Thomas S. Manning

Websites

- "Euchre: History of, by David Parlett". Parlett Games.
- Schossow, Breann (February 21, 2014). "Wisconsin's Passion For Euchre". Wisconsin Life. Wisconsin Public Radio.
- "Farmer's Hand and Going Under". Euchre.com. November 2023.
