= Lanterloo =

Card game

- The Game of Pam
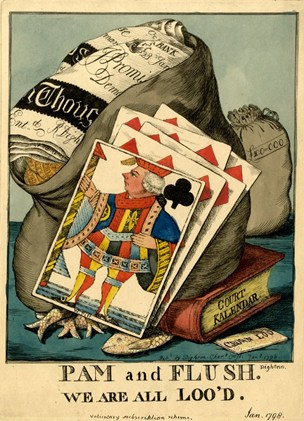
- "Pam-flush" - Four of a suit plus Pam (♣Kn)
- Origin: France
- Alternative names: Loo
- Type: Trick-taking
- Family: Rams group
- Players: 3 to 8 (5 to 7 best)
- Cards: 52
- Deck: French
- Rank (high→low): ♠Kn A K Q Kn 10...
- Play: Clockwise

Related games
- Bester Bube • Euchre • Rams • Tippen
- Features: ♠Kn as top card (Pam); 3- or 5-card hands

Lanterloo or loo is a 17th-century trick-taking game of the trump family of which many varieties are recorded. It belongs to a line of card games including Nap and rams.

== History ==
Under various spellings, like the French forms Lenterne, Lenturlu, Looterlu (meaning "fiddlesticks", a meaningless word equivalent to "Lullay", or "Lulloo", used in Lullabies), the game is supposed to have reached England from France most probably with the restoration of the monarchy in 1660. In France it was originally called Mouche ("Fly"), which was also the name of the five-card flush in that game and came to refer to the four-card flush in Lanterloo. Also called Langtrillo in its prime form and later simply Loo (also termed Lant in the north of England by 1860), most possibly for having evolved into a more elaborate form of play by the addition of new rules, it may also have been brought to England from Holland, where it was known as Lanterlu, Lanturlu or Lenterlui, or North Germany, where it was known as Lenter or Bester Bube. In 1678 a Dutch periodical records a list of games including Verquere, Karnöffel, Poch, Krimpen, Lansquenet, Triomphe, Piquet, La Bête "and that miserable Lanterlu which is in fashion."

Whichever way it was introduced to Britain, by the turn of the eighteenth century it was England's most popular card game. The rules of Lanterloo are listed by Charles Cotton in 1674 and subsequent editions of The Compleat Gamester, while a late 18th century description is given in Covent Garden Magazine. Loo was considered a great pastime by the idle rich of that time, but it acquired a very bad reputation as a potentially vicious "tavern" gambling game during the nineteenth century.

== Etymology ==
The Oxford English Dictionary quotes a 1685 reference to "Pam at Lanterloo", and William Chatto quotes a Dutch political pamphlet of about 1648 entitled Het herstelde Verkeer-bert verbetert in een Lanterluy-spel, containing a dialogue equating the game "Labate" (hence French Triomphe became La Bête, "The Beast", in Cotton's Complete Gamester, see also Labet) with "Lanterluy". This was the very first mention of the game. Chatto also cites a 1777 Cumberland ballad which recounts that "at lanter the caird-lakers sat i' the loft." Lanter or lant was three-card loo.

The name "Pam", denoting the ♣Kn in its full capacity as permanent top trump in five-card loo, represents an old medieval comic-erotic character called Pamphilus (Latin for a Greek word, meaning "beloved of all") or "Pamphile", in French, described as "an old bawd" by the New Zealand-born English lexicographer Eric Partridge.

In the North German game of Bester Bube, older rules also specify the Knave of Spades as the top trump, but by the mid-19th century, the commanding card is the trump Knave and the second highest trump is the Knave of the same colour, the Under-Knave.

== Description ==
The game is played by 3 to 8 players using a 52-card pack. The players play for tricks, and in each round they may pass or play. The main forms of the game are three-card loo, Irish loo and five-card loo. The turn to deal and play passes always to the left.

== Five-card loo ==
=== Objective ===
The pool is formed by dealer's contribution of five chips or counters. Each player is dealt five cards and the next turned for trump. Cards rank as at Whist, except that the knave of clubs, which is called Pam, is the highest trump. Each player's aim is to win at least one trick, under penalty of increasing the pool.

The players, having seen their hands, can either abandon them free of charge or elect to play, thereby undertaking to win at least one trick for one fifth of the pool. Any player failing to take a trick is "looed", and adds five more chips to the pool. This amount goes for the next deal. Each player must have the same number of deals, but if there is a "loo" (the sum forfeited by a player who plays, but does not win a trick) in the last deal of a round, the game continues till there is a hand without a loo.

=== Declarations ===
- Before play, each in turn announces whether he will play or throw his hand in.
- Any player offering to play may then exchange from 0 to 5 of their cards from the pack and may not drop out or change them back.
- If all pass, the dealer wins the pool.
- If one player exchanges and the others all pass, the exchanger then wins the pool.

=== Winning combinations ===
When any person holds a Pam-flush (four cards of a suit with Pam), whether dealt initially or obtained by drawing cards, he can sweep the pool before playing. Then there is a new deal.

The next best hand to the above is a trump-flush (five cards of a trump suit) and this sweeps the pool, if there be not a pam flush; and there is also a new deal.

The next best hand is that of a flush of other suits, which sweeps the pool; and there is also a new deal.

When any of these flushes occur, each person, excepting those who hold inferior flushes or pam, is looed, and has to pay five counters into the pool.

=== Play ===
When none of these flushes occur, the game goes on as at Whist:

The player to the dealer's left leads to the first trick. He may lead any card in his hand. The other players, in clockwise order, each play a card to the trick and must follow suit by playing a card of the suit led if he has one. A player with no card of the suit led may play any card, either discarding or trumping (unlike three-card loo, it is not compulsory to head the trick). The trick is won by the highest card of the suit led, unless a trump is played, in which case the highest trump wins. The winner of each trick leads to the next.

When the Ace of trumps is led, it is usual to say 'Pam, be civil;' the holder of Pam is then expected to let the Ace pass.

=== Payments ===
When all the cards are played out, they will make but five tricks; and all the counters in the pool are divided between the holders of these tricks, in proportion to the tricks they hold, every other player being looed—that is, obliged to pay five counters, the amount put into the pool by the dealer, to the pool for next deal.

=== Optional rules ===
- Unlimited Loo. Each person looed must pay the whole amount of the pool.
- Running Pam. Pam is the Knave of trumps, instead of the Knave of Clubs
- Must. When only five counters are in the pool, everybody must play.
- Dealer takes the turned up trump, discarding any card in lieu of it.

== Three-card loo ==
One card is dealt to each player, and the player receiving the lowest card is entitled to deal. At the commencement of the game the dealer puts three chips, or counters, in the pool, the value of which already been agreed upon by the players. The pool must be a number divisible by three, say 3, 6, 9 chips. After the cards are shuffled and cut, the dealer gives three cards (one at a time) to each player, beginning at the eldest hand, and moving left. An extra hand called Dumby, or Miss, is dealt in the centre of the table and the next turned up for trumps.

In the first hand, and whenever the pool consists of only three chips deposited by the dealer, it is called a Bold Stand, or Force, and each player must play his hand, except the eldest hand, who may exchange the Dumby for his own. Bold Stand is played for the purpose of getting a larger pool; thus, if eight are playing, and five lose, they will be looed the amount of the pool, raising the total of chips to eighteen. The deal passes left, and the dealer must always pay in the pool three counters for the deal. When the pool consists of more than the dealer's original three chips it becomes optional to play or not, and before looking at his own cards, the dealer asks all players, beginning at the eldest hand, whether they will play their own hand, take the Dumby, or decline playing that round. If the eldest declines the Dumby, the next in turn has this option, and so on.

When a player declines playing, he must give his cards to the dealer who will place them under the pack. No one can retract after declaring his intention to stand or not. When all players have declared their intention, the first in hand of those who play, if he holds two trumps, must head the trick. At the end of the game, the pool is divided into three portions. If one player takes three tricks, he wins the whole pool; if he takes two, he wins two thirds; if one, only one third. All those who have failed to win a trick are looed the original amount deposited by the dealer and when only two players stand, the last player before the dealer must either play his hand, or the Dumby, or give up the pool to the dealer.

An optional rule is "club law" whereby all must play if a club is turned as trumps.

== Irish loo ==
There is no Dumby, but each person can exchange his cards, as at Pam-Loo. Other rules are the same as at three-card loo.

== Variations ==
=== Unlimited loo ===
Each player is looed the whole amount in the pool until the occurrence of a bold stand, which only occurs when three players stand the game, and each win a trick, or when two play, and one takes two chips and the other only one. The dealer being last in hand has always the advantage of knowing how many are to play before he decides. It likewise sometimes happen, when a large sum is in the pool, that no player consider it safe to stand, in which case the dealer takes the whole pool. This variation, also known as Loo the Board, forces those who lose the game to double the amount of chips in the pool, making it grow faster than in other forms of Loo.

Terminology
Term	Definition
Bold Stand	A method of playing the game, in which it is a rule, that whenever there is only the deal to be played for, every person is obliged to stand in order to make a loo for the next hand. As often this happens, it is a bold stand.
Dumby	The spare hand, which must be dealt in the regular order, either first or last but one, and not according to the dealer's whim
Force	The same as Bold Stand
Heading the Trick	Playing a better card of the suit led, or not having any of the suit, trumping it
Loo	The sum put up by any one that is looed, and is either limited or unlimited; when unlimited, a person is looed for the whole amount of the pool; if limited, he is looed by no more than a certain sum, previously agreed upon, generally the price of the deal
Looed	A person playing is looed when he does not take a trick, or when he breaks any of the laws of the game
Miss	The same as Dumby
Misdeal	When the dealer gives any of the players more or less than three cards, or deals out of regular order, or shows a card in dealing
Mouche	A four-card flush with Pam.
Paying for the Deal	At each new deal, the dealer puts into the pool three counters, or whatever it may be agreed upon by the party to play for; this is called the price of the deal
Pool	The pool consists of counters which are paid for the deals, and of the sums forfeited by those who were looed the preceding hand.
Revoke	When a person who has suit does not play it

== See also ==
- Mistigri, a variant of the original French game, Lanturlu
- Nap
- Bourré
- Ombre

== Literature ==
- _ (1678). Extraordinare Amsterdamsche Maendaegsche Courant. Amsterdam: de Bode.
- _ (1773). The Covent Garden Magazine. Vol. 2. London: Allen.
- "Connoisseur" (1775). Annals of Gaming. London: Allen.
- Cotton, Charles (1674) The Compleat Gamester. London: A.M.
- 1676: The Compleat Gamester, 2nd edn. Charles .
- Crawley, Captain Rawdon [George Frederick Pardon] (1863). Whist, Its Theory and Practice. With Chapters on Loo and Cribbage. 7th Edn. London: S.O. Beeton.
- Heather, H. E. (1876). Cards and Card Tricks. The Bazaar, London.
