= Fipsen =

Card game

- North German cousin of Nap
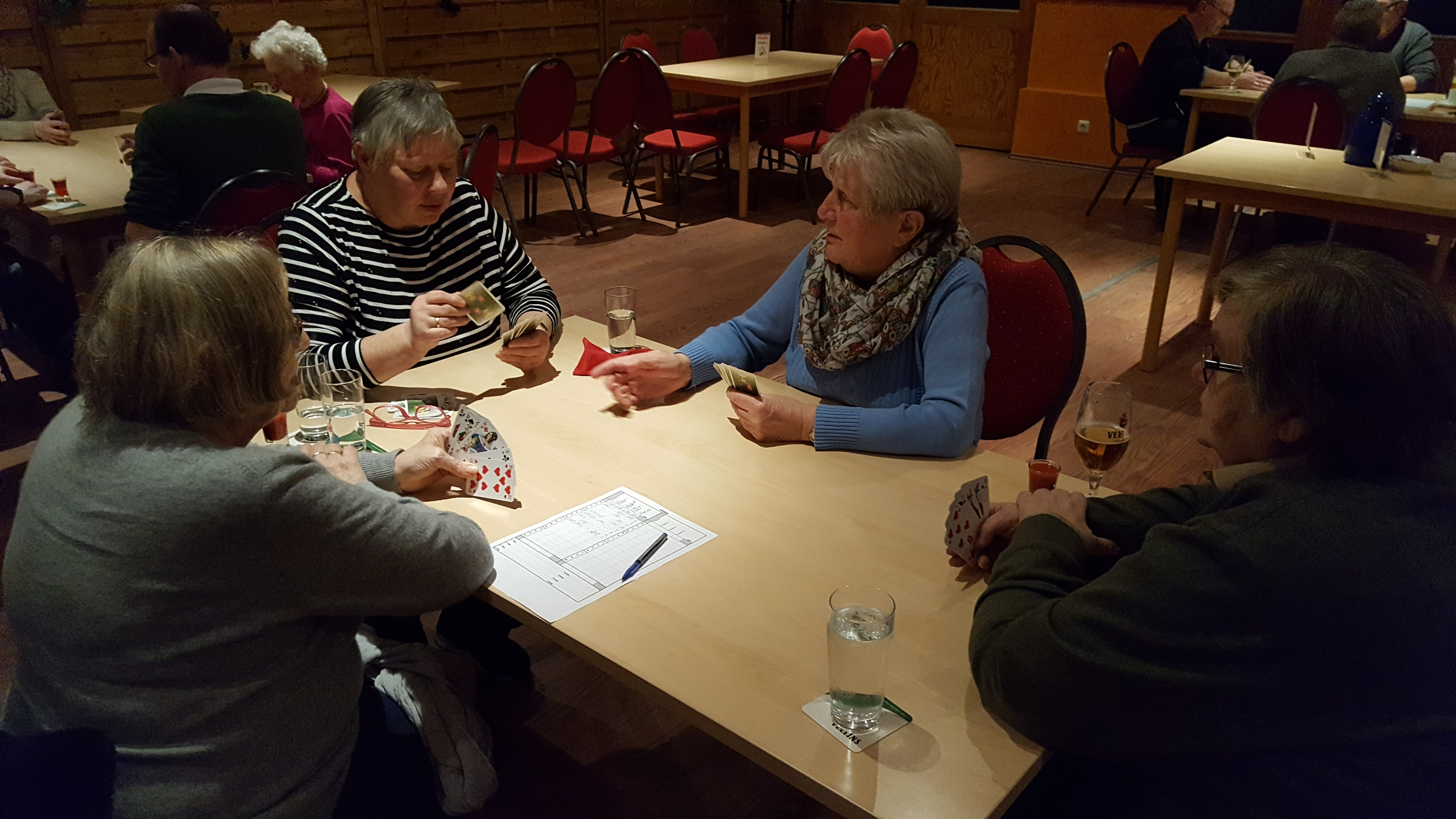
- A game of Fipsen in progress
- Origin: North Germany
- Type: Plain-trick game
- Family: Triomphe group
- Players: 4 or 5
- Cards: 25 or 32
- Deck: French pack
- Rank (high→low): A K Q J 10 9 8 7
- Play: clockwise

Related games
- Nap
- Notes: two different games. Clubs or diamonds are preference suits

Fipsen or Fips is an old north German card game for 4 or 5 players that resembles British Nap in some respects. It is a trick-taking game played with a standard Skat pack that was once popular across North Germany in the former states of Schleswig, Holstein, Mecklenburg and Pomerania, but is now restricted to the south Holstein region. In the village of Thedinghausen in Lower Saxony, a rather different game is played under the same name for currant buns called Hedewigs. It has been described as "quite a special card game" that is "ancient, but very easy to learn".

== History and distribution ==
Fipsen is an old North German card game that emerges in the sources in the late 18th and early 19th century. In 1756, the term appears in an Osnabrück dialect dictionary as "Fipsen: said of a certain card game" and, in 1781, it is recorded in a Low German dictionary for the Pomeranian region as "Fipps, a game of cards." By the mid-19th century it was thriving as a rural pastime, for example, in Dithmarschen in North Frisia it was "a game very popular among farmers" and further afield in Mecklenburg farmers played it alongside Dreikart and Solo. Finder, too, reports it being played at that time in the Vierlande area of Hamburg state together with Dreekort and other games.

But the name may have been used for more than one game. In 1929, Mensing reports that Fips is a card game "with similar or the same rules as Dreekaart" and Wossidlo tells us that "Fipp" is a "card game played with three or five cards." The earliest account of any actual rules appears as late as 1957 where two variants of the game as played in Mecklenburg are described.

Today, Fipsen is still played in central north Germany in Holstein, for example in the counties of Pinneberg, Segeberg and Stormarn in Schleswig-Holstein. There are at least two distinct variants of Holstein Fipsen as played in Prisdorf and Großenaspe. Tournaments are sometimes played, for example, in 2017 at Pinneberg.

In the village of Thedinghausen, near Verden in Lower Saxony, an entirely different game, also called Fipsen, is played between five players, traditionally played for currant buns called Hedewigs.

== Mecklenburg Fips ==
The Rutenas

Wossidlo and Teuchert give a brief description of two variants of mid-century Fips in Mecklenburg. In both cases, all the diamonds are removed from a 32-card, German-suited pack except for the Ace which is known as the Rutenas. Diamonds is thus the preferred suit or 'preference'.

Card ranking in Mecklenburg Fips
Clubs	Hearts	Spades	Diamonds (Preferred)
A K Q J 10 9 8 7	A K Q J 10 9 8 7	A K Q J 10 9 8 7	A

The first variant is Anseggerfips ("Auction Fips"). Players are dealt five cards, the remainder forming a five-card talon or Dutt. Forehand then began the auction by passing or bidding the number of tricks he or she intended to take. Later players could pass or bid a higher number of tricks or, if holding the Rutenas, nominate diamonds as trumps so that e.g. a Rutenzwei ("Diamond Two") outbid a Zwei ("Two"). A Fips was an undertaking to win all five tricks and could only be overcalled by a Rutenfips. If all passed, the cards were thrown in and re-dealt. The actual play is not described, but may have been similar to that of modern Holstein Fipsen (see below).

The second variant was Duttfips ("Widow Fips"; Dutt means "pile" or "heap" and refers to the extra hand or widow). The bidding was different. Forehand was not allowed to pass, but could play one of four contracts. In the lowest, forehand took the Dutt, discarded five cards from the resulting hand and announced trumps, playing to win the majority of tricks. This contract could be outbid by the other players with a "Ruten oewer!" - the same contract but with the Rutenas as the only trump card. The next higher bid was a Fips and the highest was a Rutenfips as before. It is likely that there was only one round of bidding and players could go straight to their highest bid, the Dutt being available in each case.

== Holstein Fipsen ==
There are at least two variants. The Prisdorf variant is played in the vicinity of Prisdorf north of Hamburg and is characterised by a shortened pack, by the option of playing without the skat and the bonus of Siebener Fips. The Großenaspe variant is played in that village and uses the full 32-card pack. Unlike its Prisdorf cousin, there are no 'hand' contracts nor is a Siebener Fips recognised.

=== Prisdorf variant ===
The lone diamond in Prisdorf Fipsen

A French-suited Skat pack is used, from which all the diamonds are discarded with the exception of the ♦7, to leave a total of 25 cards. Again, Diamonds is the preference. Within their suits they have their natural ranking:

Card ranking in Prisdorf Fipsen
Clubs	Hearts	Spades	Diamonds (Preferred)
A K Q J 10 9 8 7	A K Q J 10 9 8 7	A K Q J 10 9 8 7	7

There are four players and deal and play are clockwise. A two-card skat is placed on the table after the first packet of 3 cards is dealt to each player and before the second packet of 2 is dealt, giving each player five hand cards. Three cards are placed to one side and only used for the special bid of Kieker. There is then an auction in which players bid to become the declarer who then plays alone against the other three. Players bid the number of tricks they intend to take. The value of the game corresponds to the number of tricks bid, e.g. a bid of 3 tricks is worth 3 points multiplied by either or both of the contracts below:

- Hand game (Handspiel) - The declarer opts not to use the skat. Doubles the game value.
- Ruten - The declarer announces diamonds as trumps (there is only one diamond). Also doubles the game value.

Beginning with forehand, players may pass or bid a number of tricks. Bidding starts at two and an earlier player may "hold" a higher subsequent bid or overcall it. When either of the bidding pair passes, the next player in turn may enter the auction with a higher bid; the earlier player may then hold, pass or bid higher still. A 'hand' bid is an undertaking to play without the use of the skat and is higher than its equivalent numerical bid i.e. a "2 Hand" is higher than a "2", but a "3" is higher than a "2 Hand". A player with no courts may bid a Kieker, which ranks between a "4" and a "5" and is an undertaking to take all five tricks having picked up the skat and stock (thus having 10 cards in toto) and discarded any five cards face down before announcing trumps. In any bid other than a 'hand' or Kieker, the declarer picks up the skat and discards any two cards before announcing trumps. A player with four 7s and an Ace may declare a Siebener Fips and wins the deal without it being played, scoring 30 points. If all pass, the cards are re-dealt by the same dealer.

Forehand now leads to the first trick. Players must follow suit, but if unable may play any card. In addition, if the declarer wins every trick it is a Durch, and the score is doubled. However, if the declarer fails to achieve the target, he or she loses double.

=== Grossenaspe variant ===
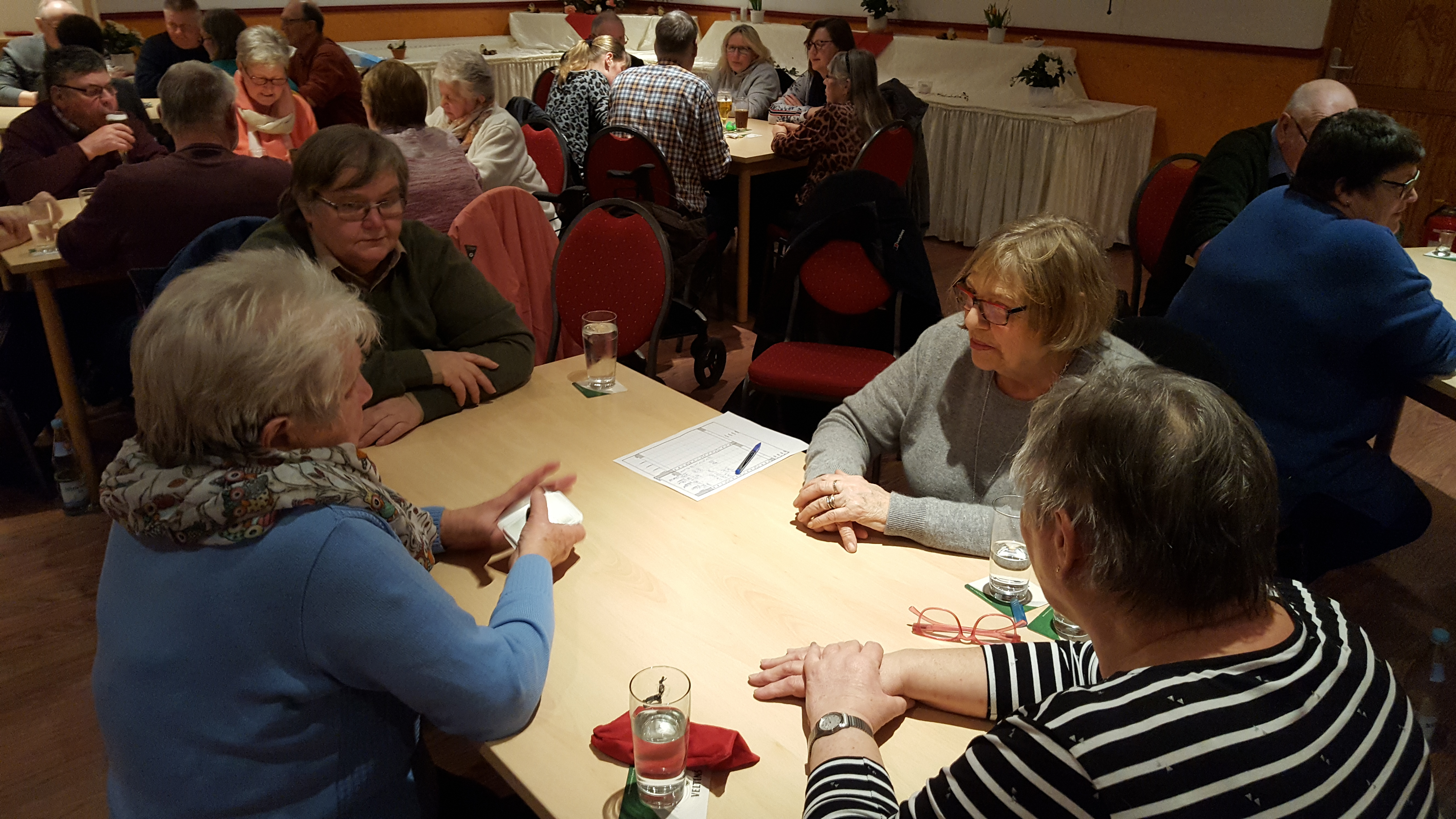
A game of tournament Fipsen in progress during a games evening in Großenaspe in March 2020.

A full, 32-card, Berlin-pattern pack is used. Cards rank in their natural order but, this time, Clubs is the preference suit.

Card ranking in Grossenaspe Fipsen
Clubs (Preferred)	Hearts	Spades	Diamonds
A K Q J 10 9 8 7	A K Q J 10 9 8 7	A K Q J 10 9 8 7	A K Q J 10 9 8 7

Players draw cards and the one who draws Clubs becomes the scribe (Schreiber) or scorer and the person sitting to the left of the scribe becomes the first dealer. Dealing is as before and there is no cutting. Players bid from "One" (Ein) to "Five" (Fünf) for the number of tricks they hope to take. Any numeric bid may be overcalled by a higher number or, since Clubs is a preference suit, by saying "Good" (Gute) which means Clubs are trumps. So "Three Good" (Drei Gute) beats a "Three" (Drei), but is beaten by a "Four" (Vier). The highest bid is a Fips which is an undertaking to win all five tricks without the aid of the skat; this is the only permitted hand contract. In addition, like the Prisdorf variant, a player with no courts may bid a Kieker, which ranks between Four and Five. If successful, the declarer of a Kieker (also called a Gucker) discards the dealt hand and picks up the skat and talon (12 cards) from which 7 more cards must be discarded to leave a hand of five. At this point the declarer may fold and concede 5 points or announce trumps and play.

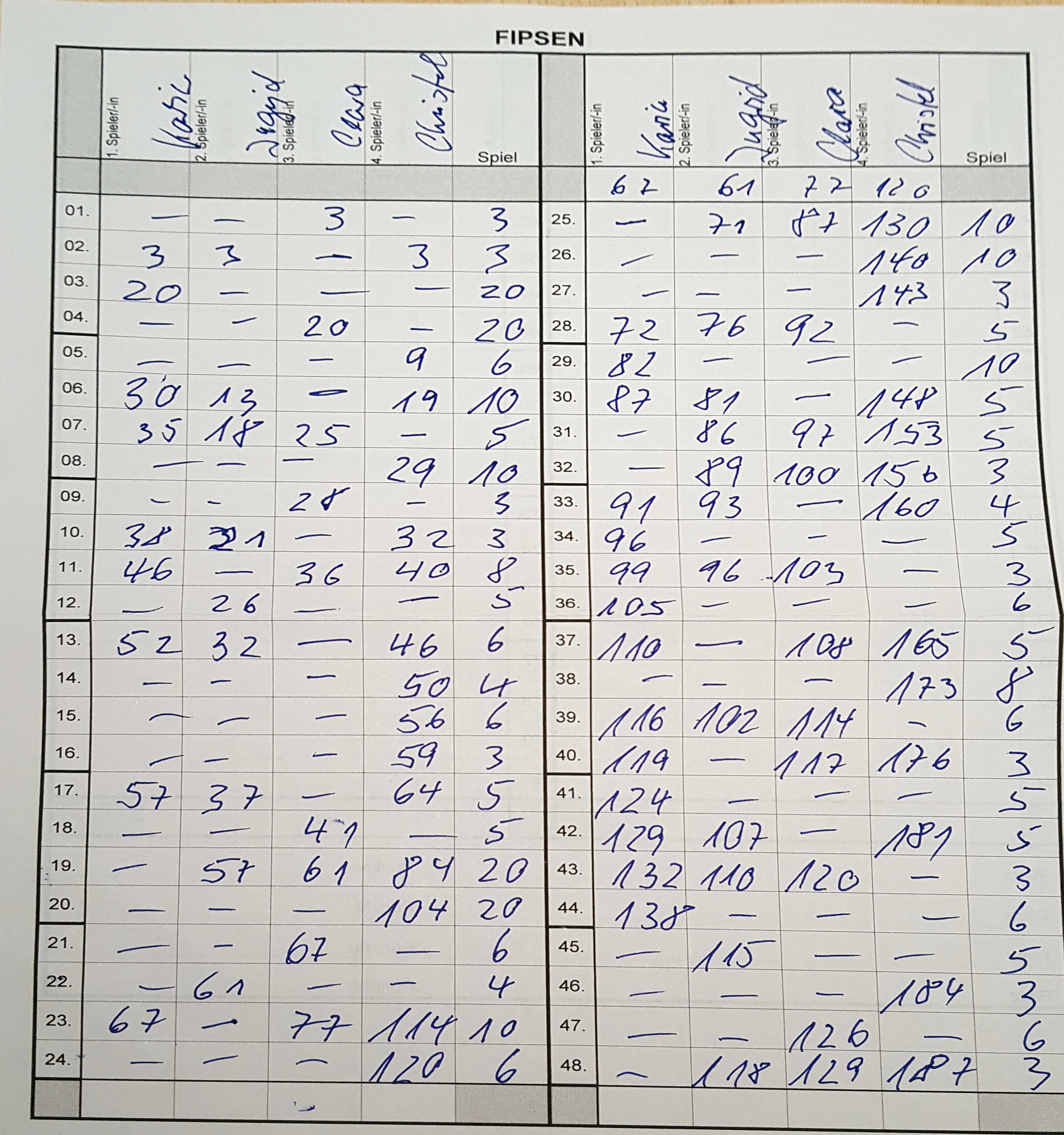
Part of a Fipsen scoresheet

The highest bidder becomes the declarer, picks up the skat, discards two cards and announces trumps unless the bid was a Good, in which case it is automatically Clubs. Forehand leads to the first trick. Players must follow suit if able, otherwise may discard. The trick winner leads to the next. Play ends when the declarer succeeds or fails to take the announced number of tricks. If successful, the declarer scores the number of tricks announced, double if Clubs are trumps. A Kieker is worth 10 points and a Fips 20. A declarer, having achieved the stated number of tricks less than five, may continue by saying "I'll play on" (ich spiel' durch) or "I want them all" (ich will alles) and play on for a Durch i.e. all five tricks. In a tournament the two higher scorers at a table win a prize - typically a haunch of pork. In private rounds, players play for penny stakes, points being converted to cents.

== Thedinghausen Fipsen ==
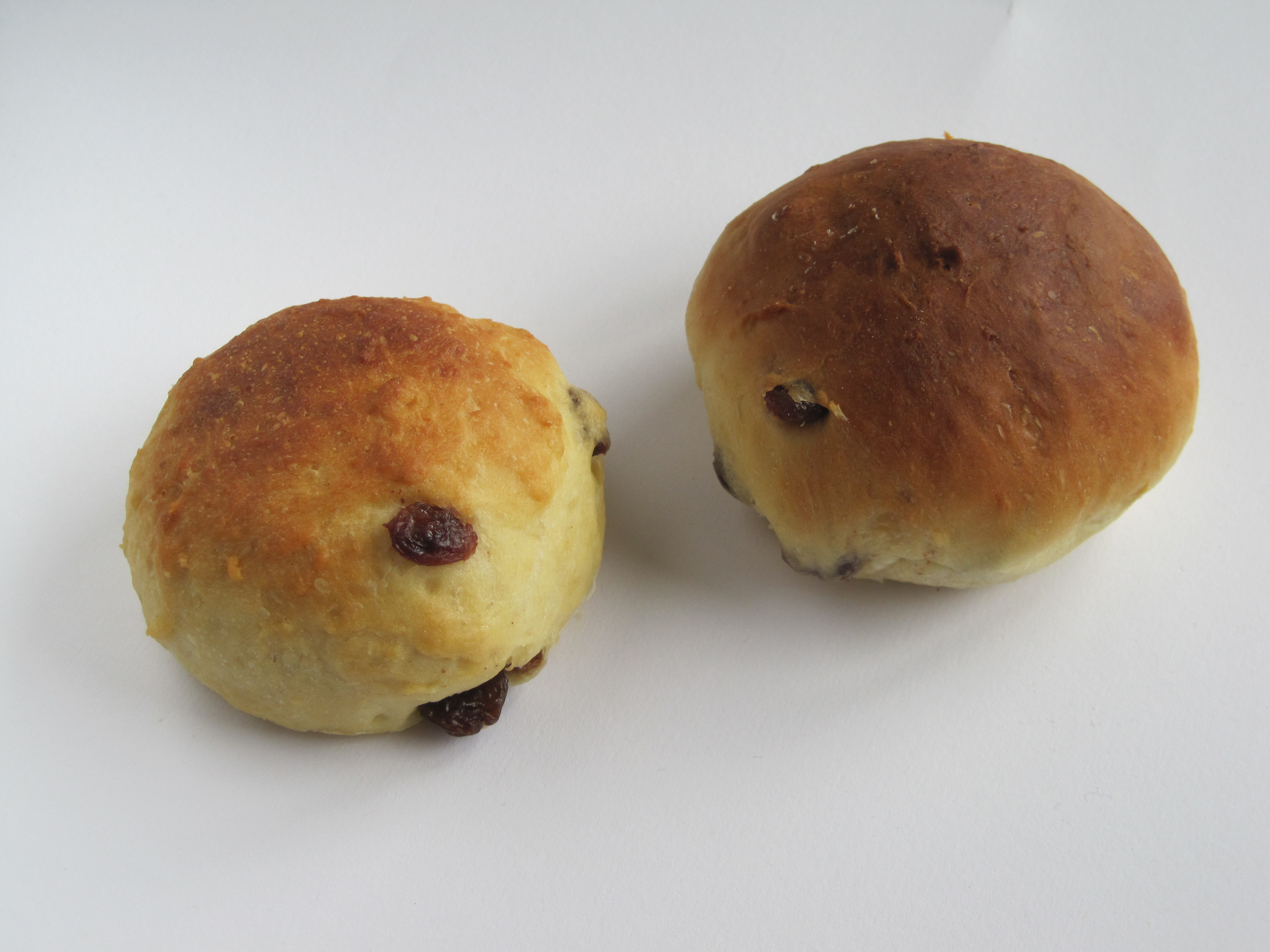
The aim of Fipsen as played in Thedinghausen is to win Hedewigs

In Thedinghausen, a village southeast of Bremen, a quite different game is traditionally played after the annual meeting of the local farmers, the Bauernkör, who formerly represented the district, the Bürgerei, and settled farming matters. Today it is a more of a social gathering with guest speakers talking about topics of local interest. After the meeting, the men repair to a pub or a member's house to play a five-hand game with no bidding.

The key differences from the games described above are that:

- The aim is to be first to take 10 tricks over several deals
- There are five players
- There is no auction
- Trumps are determined by a turn-up
- Players must follow suit and overtake if possible

The rules are as follows: Five players play with a normal Skat pack of 32 cards. Within each suit, cards rank in their natural order.

Card ranking in Thedinghausen Fipsen
Clubs	Hearts	Spades	Diamonds
A K Q J 10 9 8 7	A K Q J 10 9 8 7	A K Q J 10 9 8 7	A K Q J 10 9 8 7

Each player antes the cost of a hedewig to the pot. After shuffling and offering the pack to the right to be cut, the dealer deals five cards to each player and then turns the next as trumps. The remaining six cards are placed to one side and not used. The aim is to win as many tricks as possible.

Forehand (to the dealer's left) leads to the first trick. Suit must be followed; if that is not possible players must trump and overtrump if able. If a player, after receiving five cards, announces "fipsen", this is a slam contract and the declarer has to win all five tricks.

The first player to win ten tricks wins five hedewigs. A player who wins a fipsen, earns double, i.e. five hedewigs. If even just one trick is lost to an opponent, however, the player must pay five hedewigs. After each round, the winner is given a slip and, at the end of play, players work out how many hedewigs they have won. A hedewig is a type of currant bun local to the region and also known as a Heißwecke.

Similar games are played elsewhere in Austria and Germany. For example, in Anglia they used to play Stutenspiel for Stuten i.e. currant buns. Other games for cakes or buns are traditionally played in Hesse, and in parts of Austria.

== Literature ==
- Deutsche Jahrbücher für Politik und Literatur. Vol. 7. Mai-Heft. Guttentag, Berlin. 1863.
- Brockhaus, F.A. (1937). Der Neue Brockhaus. Leipzig: Brockhaus.
- Dähnert, Johann Carl (1781). Platt-Deutsches Wörter-Buch nach der alten und neuen Pommerschen und Rügischen Mundart. Stralsund: Struck.
- Eaton, Paul (2020). "Fipsen: One Name, Two Games." The Playing-Card, the Journal of the International Playing-Card Society. Vol. 49, no. 1, Jul–Sep 2020. pp. 18–23.
- Mensing, Otto, ed. (1929). Schleswig-Holsteinisches Wörterbuch: F bis J (in German). Vol. 2. Neumünster: Wachholtz Verlag. OCLC 163382434. Wikidata Q131604049.
- Meyer, Johann (1859). Ditmarscher Gedichte: plattdeutsche Poesien in ditmarscher Mundart. Vol. 2. Hamburg: Hoffmann and Campe.
- Schütze, Johann Friedrich (1800). Holsteinisches Idiotikon. Hamburg: Villaume.
- Strodtman, Johann Christoph (1756). Idioticon Osnabrugense: Ein Hochzeits-Geschenk an den Herrn Professor und Consistorial-Assessor Schütze bey desselben Verbindung mit der Demoiselle Esmarchinn. Leipzig and Altona: Korten.
- Wossidlo, Richard; Teuchert, Hermann (1957). Wossidlo-Teuchert Mecklenburgisches Wörterbuch. Vol. 2. Neumünster: Wachholtz.
