= Dictionarium Latinogermanicum =

Dictionarium Latinogermanicum was the title of a number of early German dictionaries (Latin-German glossaries):

- Published in 1535 version by Petrus Dasypodius (1495–1559
- Published in 1541 and 1556, by Johannes Fries (1505–1565)
