= Heißwecke =

German currant bun

A Heißwecke (German pronunciation: [haɪ̯svɛkə]; pl. Heißwecken), also called a Heißewecke or Hedewig, is a traditional type of currant bun within the German-speaking region of Europe that goes back to at least the late Middle Ages. In north and northwest Germany, it is eaten before the beginning of the pre-Easter fasting period known as Lent, especially from Rose Monday (Rosenmontag) to Ash Wednesday (Aschermittwoch). It is a sweet bread roll made with milk and wheat flour that is eaten hot, hence the name: Heißwecken literally means 'hot rolls'. Heißwecken are predominantly eaten in the area influenced by the Hanseatic League (i.e., most of northern Europe from what is now the Netherlands to Poland and the Baltic Sea coast). It has numerous dialectical names that are almost all derived from the term Heißwecken. The most common are Hedewäggen, Hetwegge, Heiteweggen, and Heetwich.

== General ==
There are several historical descriptions of Heißwecken, although there were certain variations in the different regions. They were usually round, but other shapes were also used. The sources most frequently state that the rolls were covered with hot milk and melted butter before being eaten. They were not homemade but invariably produced by bakeries. In a 1928 Schleswig-Holstein dictionary, the following description is given:

The Heißwecken are produced by bakers, usually to a secret recipe, as round cakes about 10–15 centimetres [3.9–5.9 in] in diameter. The main ingredients are wheat flour, butter and sugar; various spices (caneel ["cinnamon"], cardamom, raisins) are then added to this mixture ... Coated with butter or filled with sugar, caneel and butter and soaked in milk or egg milk, they were often eaten at every meal of the day during the first half of the 'week of fasting'.

There is a very similar definition in 1781 in a Low German dictionary, the Plattdeutsche Wörterbuch, from Western Pomerania, which calls them Heetweggen and says that they are "a Fastnacht [carnival] roll, prepared with spice, butter and eggs in hot milk as a titbit ("Löffelspeise")". The 1800 Holsteinische Idiotikon also records that servants in cities like Hamburg were sent to the baker in the morning in those days with a basket and cushions to keep the fresh rolls warm. Here three different types of Heetwegen were distinguished: those made from simple sweet dough with spices, finer milk rolls with additional raisins and thirdly, as the simplest variant, unsweetened rolls (round in shape). In Hamburg and Altona, "whole circles of relatives and acquaintances were invited to this hot breakfast, at which fine wines, spirits, mulled wines or tea were usually served to top it off."

In a 1737 Swedish cookbook, there is a recipe for hedvägg (i.e. hetvägg in present Swedish language) in high cuisine. In this version, a hole was made in the soft milk roll, the inside was scooped out with a spoon, cooked in cream and butter and then used to refill the roll, which was then eaten sprinkled with cinnamon and sugar.

== Distribution ==
=== Germany ===
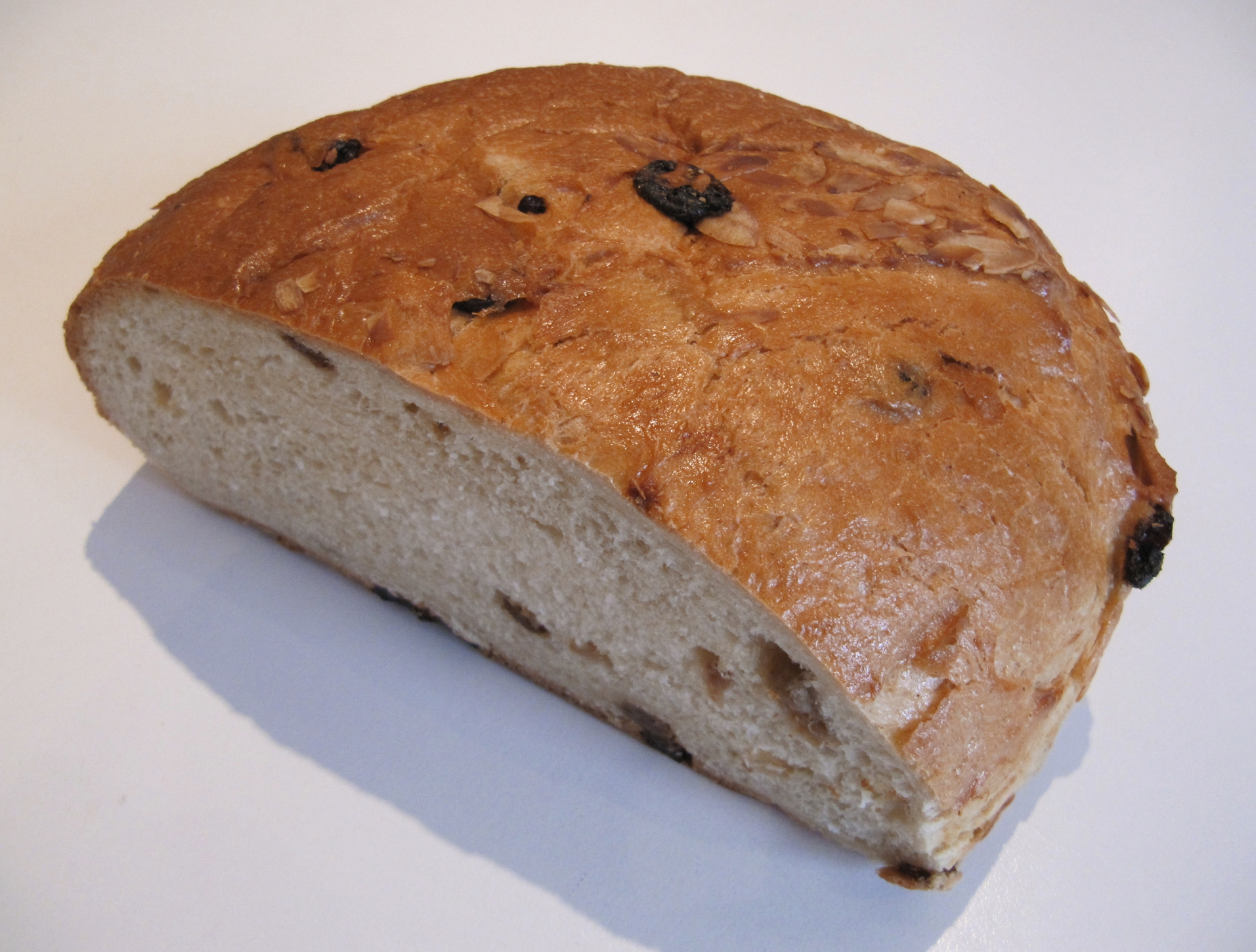
German Osterbrot (Easter loaf) with raisins and almonds

Heißwecken were regionally known in Westphalia and North Germany as early as the Late Middle Ages. Evidence from the 16th and 17th centuries shows them being produced inter alia in Soest, Geseke, Lübbecke and Münster. They have been recorded in Hamburg since the 15th century; being mentioned in the cook books of St. George's Hospital in 1447 and 1457. Heetwegge are also described in the Idioticon Hamburgense in 1755: "heisse Wecken: warm white roll, which is kneaded with melted butter or hot milk, and fills the belly during the first week of fasting. In this way, it made all the more holy the old practice of fasting from meat."

The Atlas of the German Peoples (Atlas der deutschen Volkskunde) gives an overview of the distribution of Heißwecken in 1930. "The southernmost body of evidence in Northwest Germany extends from the north of the Bergisches Land and County of Mark to East Westphalia and reaches the Weser at the northern edge of the Lippe region. This diagonal runs from southwest to northeast, grazes Dortmund (south) and includes Soest, Lippstadt and Paderborn. Further north there is an accumulation of evidence in the area of the former Prince-Bishopric of Osnabrück." Heißwecken were known throughout Schleswig-Holstein and in Hamburg, and in Mecklenburg-Vorpommern up to the Zarow, which functions as a geographical cultural border. Beyond this river, pretzels were traditionally eaten instead of rolls; in Farther Pomerania, in Posen-West Prussia, in Brandenburg and in the north of Saxony-Anhalt, the usual carnival pastry at that time was the Berliner. In East Prussia, however, there were Heißwecken again, about 320 kilometres away from the rest of its distribution area.

In Mecklenburg, Heißwecken were being eaten at Fastnacht as early as the 16th century. Around 1930, in the region of Greifswald/Wolgast and the County of Demmin, a Fastnacht roll known as a Böller was known which amounted to the same thing. This region came under Swedish influence after the Thirty Years' War, the County of Demmin until 1720, Greifswald-Wolgast until 1815; the word Böller is a Germanization of the Swedish bullar for milk roll.

The distribution of the rolls, which is restricted to the Low German language region, has led historians to posit that Heißwecken originally came from the region of Westphalia/northern Lower Saxony and then spread further eastward during the Middle Ages in the course of migration and new settlements.

=== Scandinavia ===
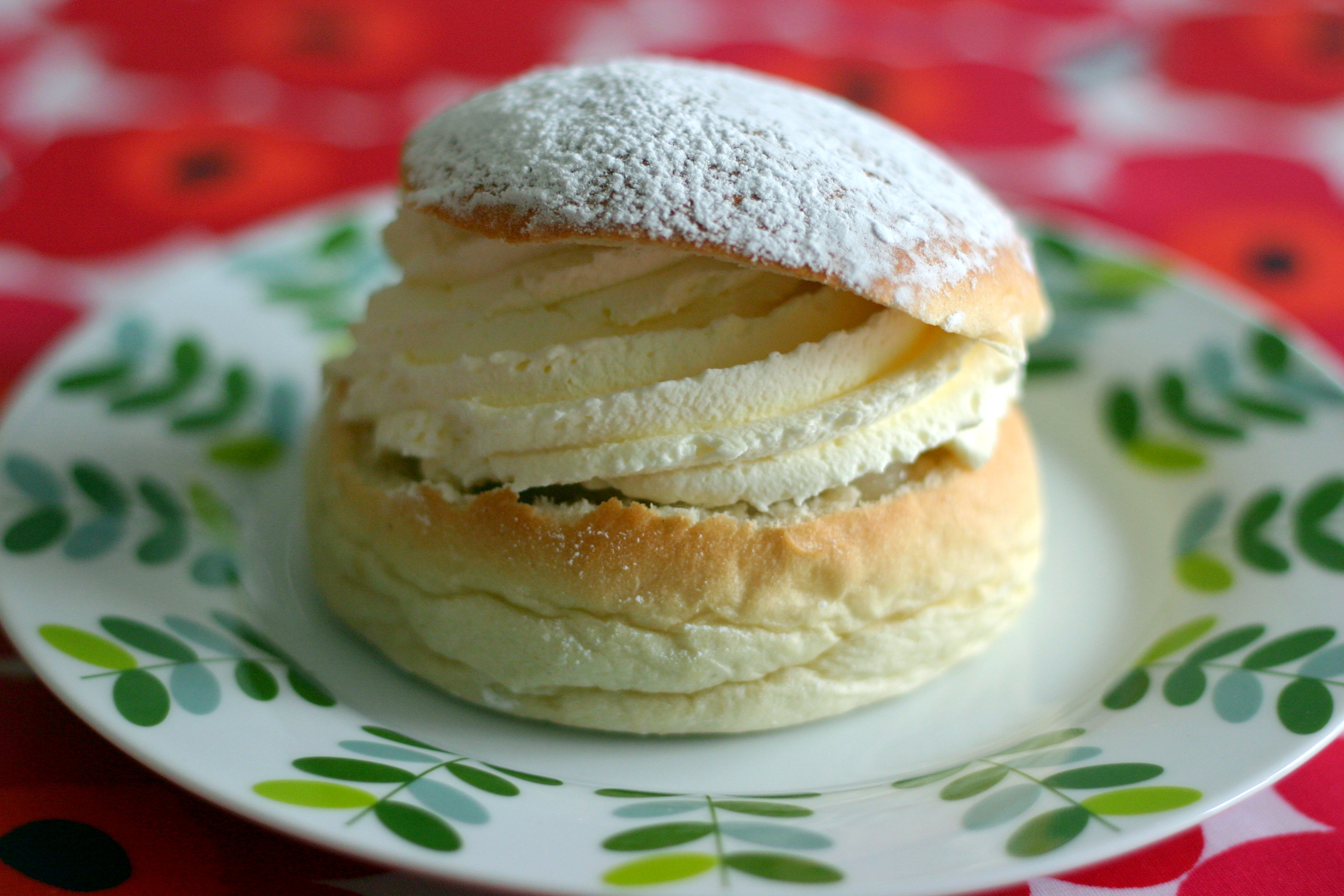
Modern Swedish Fastnacht bun

In Sweden today there are fastlagsbulle or fettisdagsbulle, which means something like "Fastnacht rolls" . They comprise sweet milk rolls with a filling of marzipan and whipped cream. This roll was introduced by the conditoreis in the 19th century. However, even before that there were Fastnacht rolls in a much simpler form, which were basically the same as the Lower German Heißwecken. In southern Sweden, Shrove Monday is traditionally called bullamandag ("Roll Monday"). In the 18th century they still called them hetvägg in Sweden. Historical evidence is the news of the death of the Swedish king Adolf Frederick in 1771 after a meal consisting of Heißwecken, sauerkraut, meat, lobster, caviar and buckling. The oldest known mention of these rolls in Sweden dates to 1698.

Segschneider assumes that the merchants of the Hanseatic League and German settlers brought Heißwecken to Sweden and the Baltic States, as early as the Middle Ages. From Riga there is a source dating to the 15th century.

=== United Kingdom ===
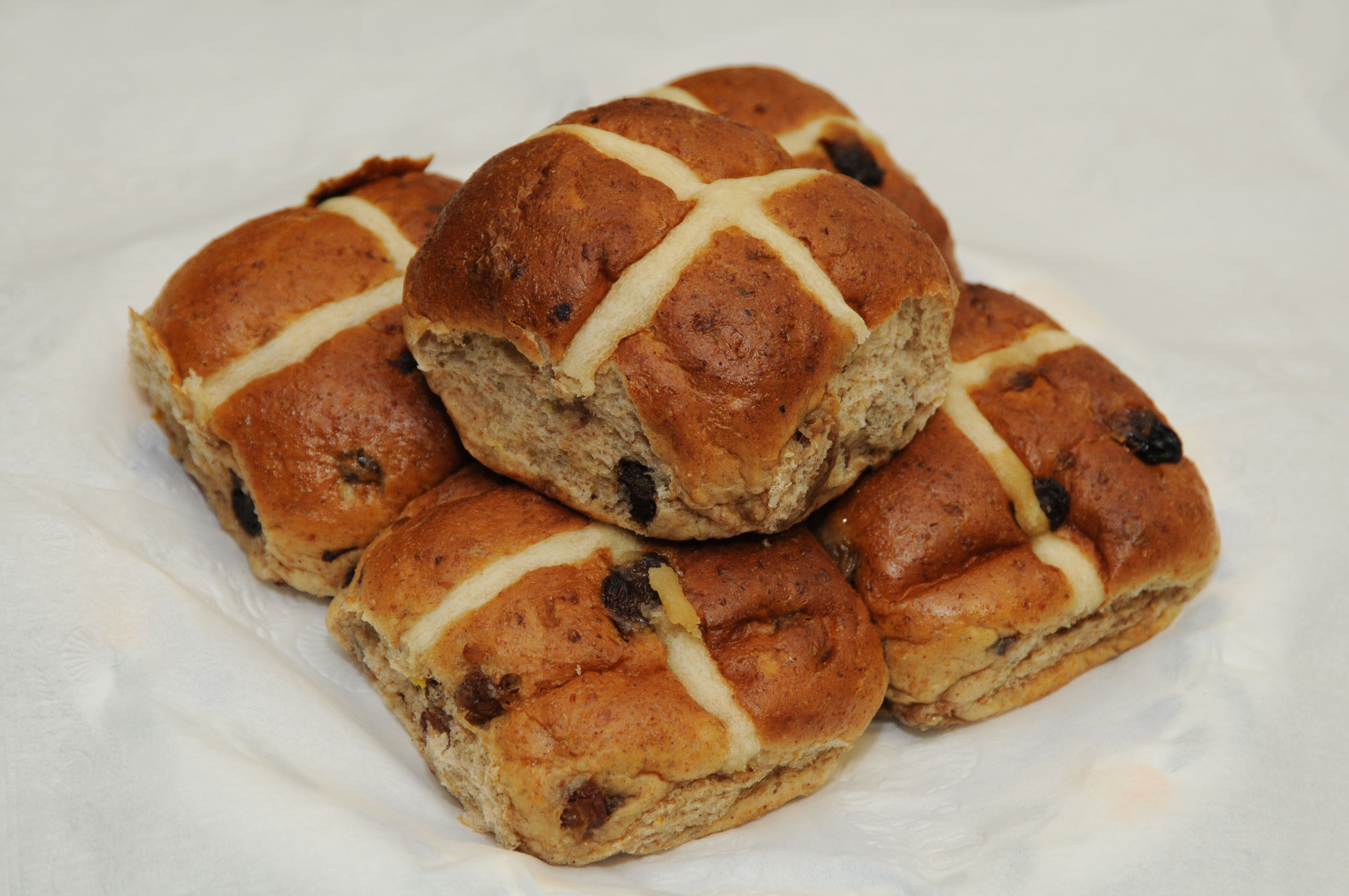
British hot cross buns

In the United Kingdom, light-coloured, sweet, milk rolls are called buns and there are many varieties. Hot cross buns are round yeast rolls containing sugar, butter, egg, raisins and various spices such as cinnamon or nutmeg. They are traditionally eaten on Good Friday and are generally still sold warm, usually also eaten warm. They bear a cross made of lighter dough that is a symbol of the Easter cross. The word 'bun' has been used in English since the 15th century. Seasoned 'spice buns' emerged during the Tudor reign in the 15th century. In 1592, an edict was issued that allowed the sale of these rolls only on special occasions, namely Good Friday, Christmas and at funerals. Today they are sold from as early as January.

== See also ==
- List of buns

== Sources ==
- David, Elizabeth (1979). English Bread and Yeast Cookery. London.
- Davidson, Alan ( (2001). The Oxford Companion to Food (2nd ed.). New York. Article on Bun.
- Dähnert, Johann Carl (1781). Platt-Deutsches Wörter-Buch. Stralsund.
- Mensing, Otto, ed. (1929). Schleswig-Holsteinisches Wörterbuch: F bis J (in German). Vol. 2. Neumünster: Wachholtz Verlag. OCLC 163382434. Wikidata Q131604049.
- Schütze, Johann Friedrich (1800). Holsteinisches Idiotikon: ein Beitrag zur Volkssittengeschichte. 1st part. Hamburg.
- Segschneider, Ernst Helmut (1996). "Heißwecken als Fastnachtsgebäck im Hanseraum". In Wiegelmann, Günter; Mohrmann, Ruth (eds.). Nahrung und Tischkultur im Hanseraum. Münster.
