= Johannes Frisius =

Johannes Frisius may refer to:

- Johannes Fries (1505–1565), also known as Johannes Frisius, Swiss theologian and lexicographer
- Johannes Acronius Frisius (1520–1564), Dutch doctor and mathematician
