= Isaac Habrecht =

Isaac Habrecht is the name of:

- Isaac Habrecht I (1544–1622), horologist
- Isaac Habrecht II (1589–1633), doctor of medicine and philosophy / professor of astronomy and mathematics
