= List of German dictionaries =

This list includes notable historic, standardized and common-use dictionaries of the German language. The beginnings of German dictionaries date back to a series of glossaries from the 8th century CE.

The first comprehensive German dictionary, the Deutsches Wörterbuch (DWB), was begun by the Brothers Grimm in 1838. The Duden dictionary, begun in 1880 and now in its 25th edition, is currently the prescriptive source for the spelling of Standard German. The official dictionary for Austrian Standard German, the Österreichisches Wörterbuch (ÖWB), is published by the Austrian Federal Government.

== Older German dictionaries ==
- The precursor German dictionaries were glossaries, of which the Abrogans from the 8th century is the oldest known.
- Petrus Dasypodius, Dictionarium Latinogermanicum, 1535
- Frisius (Johannes Fries, Dictionarium Latinogermanicum, 1541, 1556)
- Pictorius (Josua Maaler, Die Teütsch spraach, 1556)
- Adelung (Grammatisch-kritisches Wörterbuch der Hochdeutschen Mundart) by Johann Christoph Adelung, first edition 1781. The first major overall linguistic dictionary of the German language.
- Handwörterbuch der deutschen Sprache, a pocket dictionary by Johann Christian August Heyse, continued by his son Karl Wilhelm Ludwig Heyse, 1833–1849
- Deutsches Wörterbuch (also known as the Grimmsches Wörterbuch or DWB), by Jacob Grimm and Wilhelm Grimm. The first comprehensive German dictionary developed on historical principles. Begun in 1838, first published in 1854, completed in 1961, supplemented 1971.
- Technologisches Wörterbuch of German, French and English and other languages by Johann Adam Beil, 1853. An early technical dictionary.
- Wörterbuch der deutschen Sprache by Daniel Sanders (1860–1865)
- der Duden, the spelling dictionary of Konrad Duden, first edition 1880
- Etymologisches Wörterbuch der deutschen Sprache von Friedrich Kluge, first edition 1883. Now in its 24th edition on CD-Rom by de Gruyter, 2002
- Deutsches Wörterbuch by Moritz Heyne, 1890–1895

=== Regional and multi-volume dialect dictionaries ===
The list contains the (more or less) "recent", regional and multi-volume dictionaries that have been compiled using "scholarly" principles.

- Badisches Wörterbuch (1925ff.)
- Bayerisches Wörterbuch (1995ff.)
- Brandenburg-Berlinisches Wörterbuch (1968–2001)
- Frankfurter Wörterbuch (1971–1985)
- Fränkisches Wörterbuch
- Hamburgisches Wörterbuch (1985–2006)
- Helgoländer Wörterbuch (1957ff.)
- Hessen-Nassauisches Wörterbuch (1927ff.)
- Luxemburger Wörterbuch (1954–1975)
- Mecklenburgisches Wörterbuch (1937–1992)
- Mittelelbisches Wörterbuch (2002ff.)
- Adam Wrede (1981)
- Niedersächsisches Wörterbuch (1953/65ff.)
- Nordfriesisches Wörterbuch
- Nordsiebenbürgisch-Sächsisches Wörterbuch (1968–2006)
- Oberharzer Wörterbuch
- Pfälzisches Wörterbuch (1965–1998)
- Pommersches Wörterbuch (1997ff.)
- Preußisches Wörterbuch (1981–2005)
- Rheinisches Wörterbuch (1928–1971)
- Schlesisches Wörterbuch (1963–1965)
- Schleswig-Holsteinisches Wörterbuch (1906, 1925/1927–1935)
- Schwäbisches Wörterbuch (1901–1936)
- Schweizerisches Idiotikon (1881ff.)
- Siebenbürgisch-Sächsisches Wörterbuch (1924–1931, 1971ff.)
- Sudetendeutsches Wörterbuch (1988ff.)
- Südhessisches Wörterbuch (1965/68–2010)
- Thüringisches Wörterbuch (1966/99–2006)
- Vorarlbergisches Wörterbuch (1960–1965)
- Westfälisches Wörterbuch (1969ff.)
- Wörterbuch der bairischen Mundarten in Österreich (1963ff.)
- Wörterbuch der Banater deutschen Mundarten (2013ff.)
- Wörterbuch der deutsch-lothringischen Mundarten (1909)
- Wörterbuch der donauschwäbischen Fachwortschätze (1997–2005)
- Wörterbuch der elsässischen Mundarten (1899–1907)
- Wörterbuch der obersächsischen Mundarten (1978–2003)
- Wörterbuch der Ungarndeutschen Mundarten

== Current Standard German dictionaries ==
- Brockhaus Wahrig Deutsches Wörterbuch, 9th edition (2011); a large dictionary in 6 volumes originally published by Gerhard Wahrig, now at Bertelsmann. The publisher reports it is discontinued (2012).
- * Digitales Wörterbuch der deutschen Sprache (DWDS). A continually updated online dictionary incorporating within it many of the dictionaries listed on this page, such as the WDG, WDW, and DWS, as well as Wolfgang Pfeifer's Etymologische Wörterbuch des Deutschen.
- DUDEN - Das große Wörterbuch der deutschen Sprache (GWDS or GWB), 4th edition (2012), only CD-ROM
- Duden, a twelve-volume series of specialized dictionaries, 25th edition (2012).
- Duden Universalwörterbuch (DUW): a single-volume general overall linguistic dictionary, now in its 9th edition (2019)
- Handwörterbuch der deutschen Gegenwartssprache (1984), published by Kempcke in 2 volumes
- Hermann Pauls Deutsches Wörterbuch, 10th edition (2002)
- Lutz Mackensens Deutsches Wörterbuch, 13th edition (1986; reprinted 2002 & 2006) with specialized information on spelling, grammar, style, words, symbols and abbreviations, pronunciation and history of German vocabulary
- Österreichisches Wörterbuch (ÖWB), 42nd edition (2012): The official dictionary of the German language for Austria. It is published by the Austrian Federal Publisher in Vienna.
- Variantenwörterbuch des Deutschen (2004): describes regional variations of Standard German.
- Wörterbuch der deutschen Gegenwartssprache (WDG), published in 1961-77 in 6 volumes by the Academy of Sciences of the German Democratic Republic

Deutsch als Fremdsprache (German as a foreign language)

- Langenscheidts Großwörterbuch Deutsch als Fremdsprache (1993), published by Kempcke
- PONS Großwörterbuch Deutsch als Fremdsprache (2011), edited by Werner Wolski & Andreas Cyffka
- Wörterbuch Deutsch als Fremdsprache (2000) by de Gruyter

English and German dictionaries

- Oxford German Dictionary Third Edition: Oxford. Published: 10 July 2008.
- Collins German-English English-German Dictionary, by J. M. Clark. London/Glasgow: Collins. First published 1953.

== See also ==
- Category:Dictionaries by language

== Bibliography ==
- Franz Claes: Bibliographisches Verzeichnis der deutschen Vokabulare und Wörterbücher, gedruckt bis 1600. Hildesheim: Olms, 1977
- Ulrike Haß-Zumkehr: Deutsche Wörterbücher. Brennpunkt von Sprach- und Kulturgeschichte. Berlin/New York 2001.
- Peter Kühn: Deutsche Wörterbücher: eine systematische Bibliographie. Tübingen: Niemeyer 1978
- Burkhard Schaeder: Kleine Bibliographie deutscher Wörterbücher - systematisch geordnet: Enzyklopädien, Fachwörterbücher, allgemeine Sprachwörterbücher, spezielle Sprachwörterbücher. Siegen: Siegener Institut für Sprachen im Beruf, 2000
- Herbert Ernst Wiegand: Wörterbuchforschung: Untersuchungen zur Wörterbuchbenutzung, zur Theorie, Geschichte, Kritik und Automatisierung der Lexikographie. Berlin/New York: de Gruyter, 2000.
- Herbert Ernst Wiegand: Die deutsche Lexikographie der Gegenwart. In: v. Franz Josef Hausmann, Oskar Reichmann, Herbert Ernst Wiegand, Ladislav Zgusta (eds.) Wörterbücher, Dictionaries, Dictionnaires. Ein internationales Handbuch zur Lexikographie. Berlin/New York 1990, 2100–2246.
- Wolfram Zaunmüller: Bibliographisches Handbuch der Sprachwörterbücher, ein internationales Verzeichnis von 5600 Wörterbüchern der Jahre 1460 - 1958 für mehr als 500 Sprachen und Dialekte. Stuttgart: Hiersemann 1958
