= Northern Germany =

Geographic region in Europe

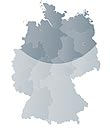
Extent of Northern Germany

Northern Germany (German: Norddeutschland, [ˈnɔʁtdɔɪ̯tʃlant]) is a linguistic, geographic, socio-cultural and historic region in the northern part of Germany which includes the coastal states of Schleswig-Holstein, Mecklenburg-Vorpommern and Lower Saxony and the two city-states Hamburg and Bremen. It contrasts with Southern Germany.

== Language ==
Uerdingen line: ich ("I") and ik isogloss

Northern Germany generally refers to the Sprachraum area north of the Uerdingen and Benrath line isoglosses, where Low German dialects are spoken. These comprise the Low Saxon dialects in the west (including the Westphalian language area up to the Rhineland), the East Low German region along the Baltic coast with Western Pomerania, the Altmark and northern Brandenburg, as well as the North Low German dialects.

Although from the 19th century onwards, the use of Standard German was strongly promoted especially by the Prussian administration, Low German dialects are still present in rural areas, with an estimated number of five to eight million active speakers. However, since World War II and the immigration of expellees from the former eastern territories of Germany, its prevalence has steadily reduced. Besides which, Frisian is spoken in East and North Frisia, as well as Danish (Standard and South Jutlandic) in parts of Schleswig.

== Geography ==
The key terrain feature of Northern Germany is the North German Plain including the marshes along the coastline of the North and Baltic Seas, as well as the geest and heaths inland. Also prominent are the low hills of the Baltic Uplands, the ground moraines, end moraines, sandur, glacial valleys, bogs and Luch.

These features were formed during the Weichselian glaciation and contrast topographically with the adjacent Central Uplands of Germany to the south, such as the Harz and Teutoburg Forest, which are occasionally counted as part of Northern Germany.

== Culture ==
Northern Germany has traditionally been dominated by Protestantism, especially Lutheranism. The two northern provinces of Schleswig-Holstein and Lower Saxony have the highest proportion of self-reported Lutherans in Germany. Exceptions include the Catholic districts of Emsland, Cloppenburg and Vechta in the west, traditionally linked to the Catholic region of Westphalia in the south, and the southernmost region of Lower Saxony, around the city of Duderstadt, comprising part of the traditional Catholic enclave of Eichsfeld.

Culturally and socially, Northern Germany is characterized by higher levels of income equality and gender equality than southern and south-western Germany. While the national federal Gini coefficient for Germany stands at around 30, the southern states have a Gini coefficient of 30.6 whereas for the Northern states the Gini coefficient stands at 27.5 which is closer to the Scandinavian average of 25. Traditional society in the western part of Northern Germany (Schleswig-Holstein, Lower Saxony and some parts of North Rhine-Westphalia and Saxony-Anhalt) until the early 20th century was based on well-off, literate and landowning yeoman farmers owning relatively large pieces of land, making a living growing grain crops and raising dairy cattle and pigs, and a large and educated middle class in the towns and cities working in the civil service, or as businessmen, artisans, blue-collar workers and skilled workers. Thus, the proportion of serfs, landless labourers, semi-skilled industrial workers and large landlords was relatively smaller, making for a more stable society than elsewhere in Germany like the Rhineland region and the region east of the Elbe river. Additionally, Northern cities like Hamburg, Bremen and Rostock have always been economic powerhouses of trade and commerce and have had a long tradition of innovation and creativity in business and industry.

Northern German culture, especially those of Lower Saxony and Schleswig-Holstein are very similar to the culture of the Netherlands, due to their common Lower Saxon history.

== Cuisine ==
The traditional northern German daily diet is centered around boiled potatoes, rye bread, dairy products, cabbages, cucumbers, berries, jams, fish, and pork and beef. A breakfast specialty is the crispbread (Knäckebrot), eaten with a variety of toppings such as ham, soft cheese, cucumber, tomatoes, and liver paste. Lentil stews and soups are very popular as a working lunch. Regional specialties in Schleswig-Holstein, Mecklenburg-Vorpommern and Lower Saxony include blood sausage (Blutwurst) and a variety of black puddings commonly eaten for brunch. Another northern German regional specialty are meatloaves (Hackbraten), made from a mixture of ground pork and beef and served with mashed potatoes, brown sauce and lingonberry jam. Many traditional meat-based lunch dishes are served with boiled or mashed potatoes and brown sauce. Eating brunch is very popular during weekends in the larger towns and cities. In regions nearer to the coast, fish is very popular, with pickled herring and salmon being delicacies.

Drinking coffee is firmly rooted in northern Germany and the northern provinces on average consume around 8 kilograms (18 lb) of coffee per capita annually. This is more than the 6 kilograms (13 lb) of coffee per capita consumed in the south. Coffee is frequently drunk four times a day: at breakfast, after lunch, in the evening at around 4 pm, and after dinner. Many people also drink a coffee at their place of work at the start of the day's work, and a coffee break with colleagues around an hour before or after lunch. There is also a strong tradition of taking coffee breaks and visiting cafés with friends and acquaintances. In places such as publicly funded universities where free coffee is not available to students, it is not uncommon for students to bring their own hot coffee in insulated flasks and drink from it intermittently. Cafés usually offer medium-fat milk and sugar cubes along with filter coffee. Commonly eaten desserts include waffles with ice cream, pancakes, the sweet bun roll with cream known as Heißwecke, and blueberry pie (Heidelbeerkuchen) with vanilla cream.

The northwesternmost region of East Frisia is an exception insofar as tea is largely preferred over coffee there, to the extent that East Frisians drink about 300 litres (79 US gal) of tea per capita and year, more than in any particular country.

Lunch at workplaces and educational institutions in northern Germany begins very early – usually between 11:45 and 12:15 pm, and dinner is usually eaten between 7 and 8 pm. This is because the work and school day starts pretty early, at 8 am sharp. Lunches eaten at home during holidays and weekends usually start later – around 1 pm.

The drinking culture in the north is more or less similar to that of the rest of the country, heavily based on beer with pale lagers and pilsners being favourites. Unlike Bavaria and Central Germany, dark beers or dark lagers are not at all popular in northern Germany. The north has a slightly stronger tradition of hard liquor, such as corn, vodka, and schnapps. Binge drinking is far more common in the north – almost 70% of binge drinking hospitalizations on weekends happen in the eight northern provinces and states containing just 40% of the population. As in all of Germany, mulled wine is a popular alcoholic drink during the Christmas season.

== History ==
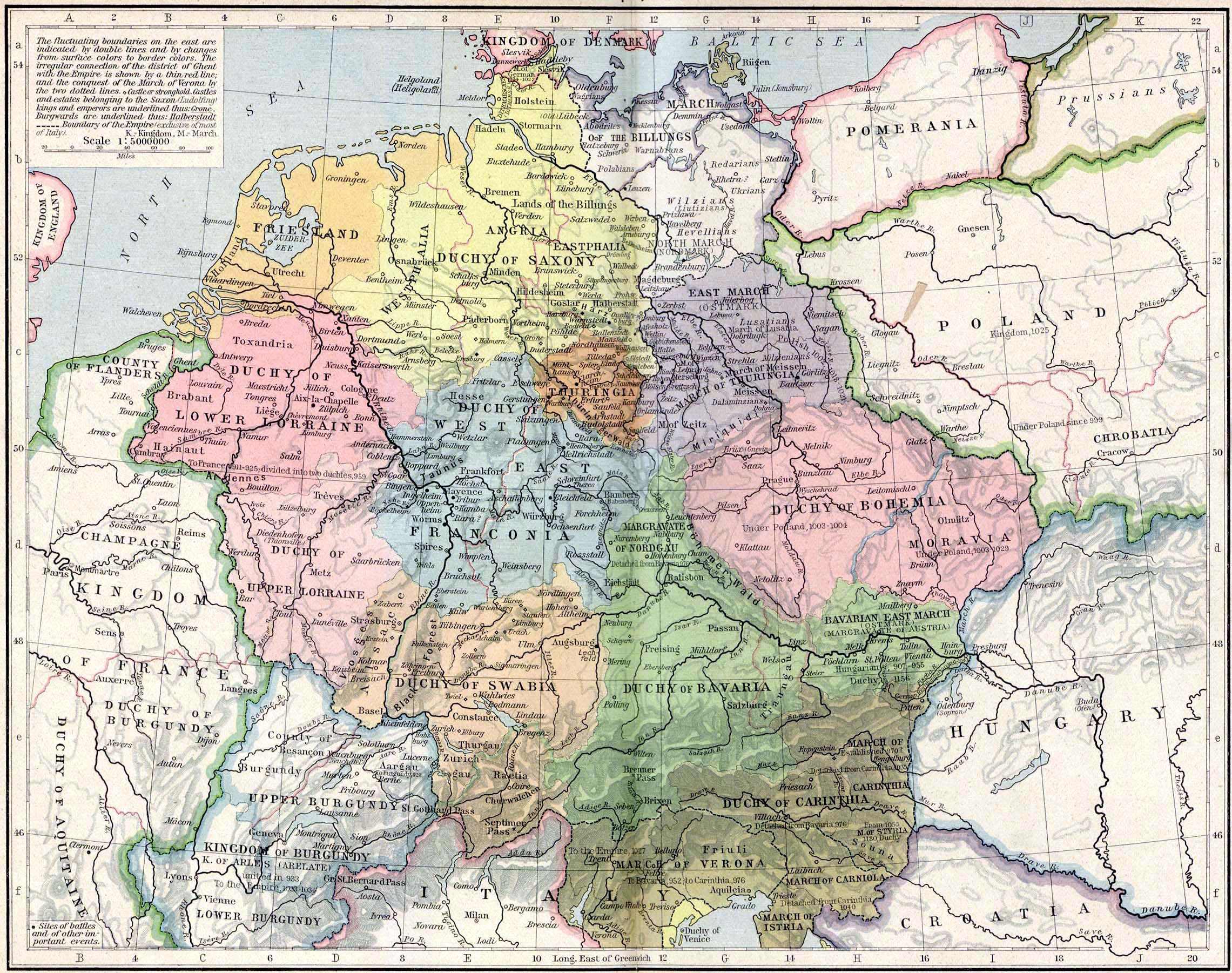
Holy Roman Empire Saxony in yellow (c. 1000 AD)

In the Early Middle Ages, Northern Germany was the settlement area of the Saxon tribes, which were subjugated by the Frankish ruler Charlemagne in the Saxon Wars from 772 onwards, whereafter the Imperial Duchy of Saxony was established in 804. In the 10th century the Saxon lands, enlarged by the Saxon Eastern March, became the cradle of the Kingdom of Germany and the Holy Roman Empire, when the dukes of the Ottonian dynasty were elected King of the Romans and crowned Holy Roman Emperors.

From 1500 onwards, the former Saxon territories (except for Westphalia) were incorporated into the Lower Saxon Circle of the Holy Roman Empire. The Hanseatic League is also part of the common history and culture of the cities in northern Germany.

Northern Germany corresponds to the territory of the North German Confederation in the 19th century. The boundary between the spheres of political influence of Prussia (Northern Germany) and Austria (Southern Germany) within the German Confederation (1815–1866) was known as the "Main line" (Mainlinie, after the river Main), Frankfurt am Main being the seat of the federal assembly. The "Main line" did not follow the course of the river Main upstream of Frankfurt, rather corresponding to the northern border of the Kingdom of Bavaria.

Cultural or political east–west divisions have existed in northern Germany since at least the early modern period, when

- the easternmost and southeastern part (mainly East Prussia, Brandenburgian Pomerania, and Brandenburg) was owned by or part of the State of the Teutonic Order and later Brandenburg-Prussia,
- the middle part (the island of Rügen, parts of Western Pomerania, eastern coastal regions of Schleswig-Holstein, and a fragmented Mecklenburg in the middle) during the Early Middle Ages was at least in parts inhabited by a large Slavic population (see Obotrites and Veleti) and for a long time from the High Middle Ages onwards was first under Danish (Principality of Rügen, 1168–1365), then Swedish influence as Swedish Pomerania (1628-1807/15),
- and the Western part (today most of Schleswig-Holstein and all of Lower Saxony, including the Hanseatic city states and other towns in the region), sometimes known as Nordwestdeutschland and defined by the original homegrounds of the two tribes of the Frisians and Saxons, which would later comprise the Duchy of Saxony (est. 806), the Lower Rhenish–Westphalian Circle (1500), and the Lower Saxon Circle (1512). Nordwestdeutschland also more or less corresponds to the British Zone of Occupation in Allied-occupied Germany between 1945 and 1949.

During the Cold War of the second half of the 20th century, a cultural division of northern Germany into an Eastern and a Western part has become more pronounced due to the 1949–1990 division of all of Germany into West Germany and East Germany, where identities based upon the former Iron Curtain and mutual prejudices regarding what once was the other side may still persist today.

A number of Scottish and English Lutheran Families settled in Northern Germany between the years 1683 and 1709, with the result that many Germans in Northwest Germany can claim Scottish and English ancestry.

== Northern German states ==
The term northern German states is always used to refer to the following coastal federal States of Germany:

- Bremen
- Hamburg
- Mecklenburg-Vorpommern
- Lower Saxony
- Schleswig-Holstein

In some cases, it also includes the non-coastal states of:

- Brandenburg
- Berlin
- Saxony-Anhalt
- North Rhine-Westphalia

Northern Germany as a region or as a historical landscape includes additional federal states (see geography above). Northwestern Germany is usually considered to be part of Northern Europe both culturally and geographically where as the southern states are much closer to Central European cultures.

== Major cities ==
Where a city has different names in English and German, the English name is given first.

Federal capital
State capital

Rank	City	Pop. 1950	Pop. 1960	Pop. 1970	Pop. 1980	Pop. 1990	Pop. 2000	Pop. 2010	Area [km^{2}]	Density per km^{2}	Growth [%] (2000– 2010)	surpassed 100,000	State (Bundesland)
1.	Berlin	3,336,026	3,274,016	3,208,719	3,048,759	3,433,695	3,382,169	3,460,725	887,70	3,899	2.32	1747	Berlin
2.	Hamburg	1,605,606	2,376,958	1,793,640	1,645,095	1,652,363	1,715,392	1,786,448	755,16	2,366	4.14	1787	Hamburg
3.	Bremen	499,549	563,270	592,533	555,118	551,219	539,403	547,340	325,42	1,682	1.47	1875	Free Hanseatic City of Bremen
4.	Hanover	444,296	574,672	521,003	534,623	513,010	515,001	522,686	204,14	2,560	1.49	1875	Lower Saxony
5.	Bielefeld	153,613	174,527	168,609	312,708	319,037	321,758	323,270	257,92	1,253	0.47	1930	North Rhine-Westphalia
6.	Münster	118,496	180,871	198,878	269,696	259,438	265,609	279,803	302,96	924	5.34	1915	North Rhine-Westphalia
7.	Braunschweig	223,760	242,489	223,275	261,141	245,816	245,816	248,867	192,15	1,295	1.24	1890	Lower Saxony
8.	Kiel	254,449	271,610	271,070	250,062	245,567	232,612	239,526	118,65	2,019	2.97	1898	Schleswig-Holstein
9.	Magdeburg	260,305	261,594	272,237	289,032	278,807	231,450	231,549	200,99	1,152	0.04	1882	Saxony-Anhalt
10.	Lübeck	238,276	232,140	239,955	220,588	214,758	213,399	210,232	214,21	981	−1.48	1912	Schleswig-Holstein
11.	Rostock	133,109	158,630	198,636	232,506	248,088	200,506	202,735	181,26	1,118	1.11	1935	Mecklenburg-Vorpommern
Rank	City	Pop. 1950	Pop. 1960	Pop. 1970	Pop. 1980	Pop. 1990	Pop. 2000	Pop. 2010	Area [km^{2}]	Density per km^{2}	Growth [%] (2000– 2010)	surpassed 100,000	State (Land)

== Sports ==
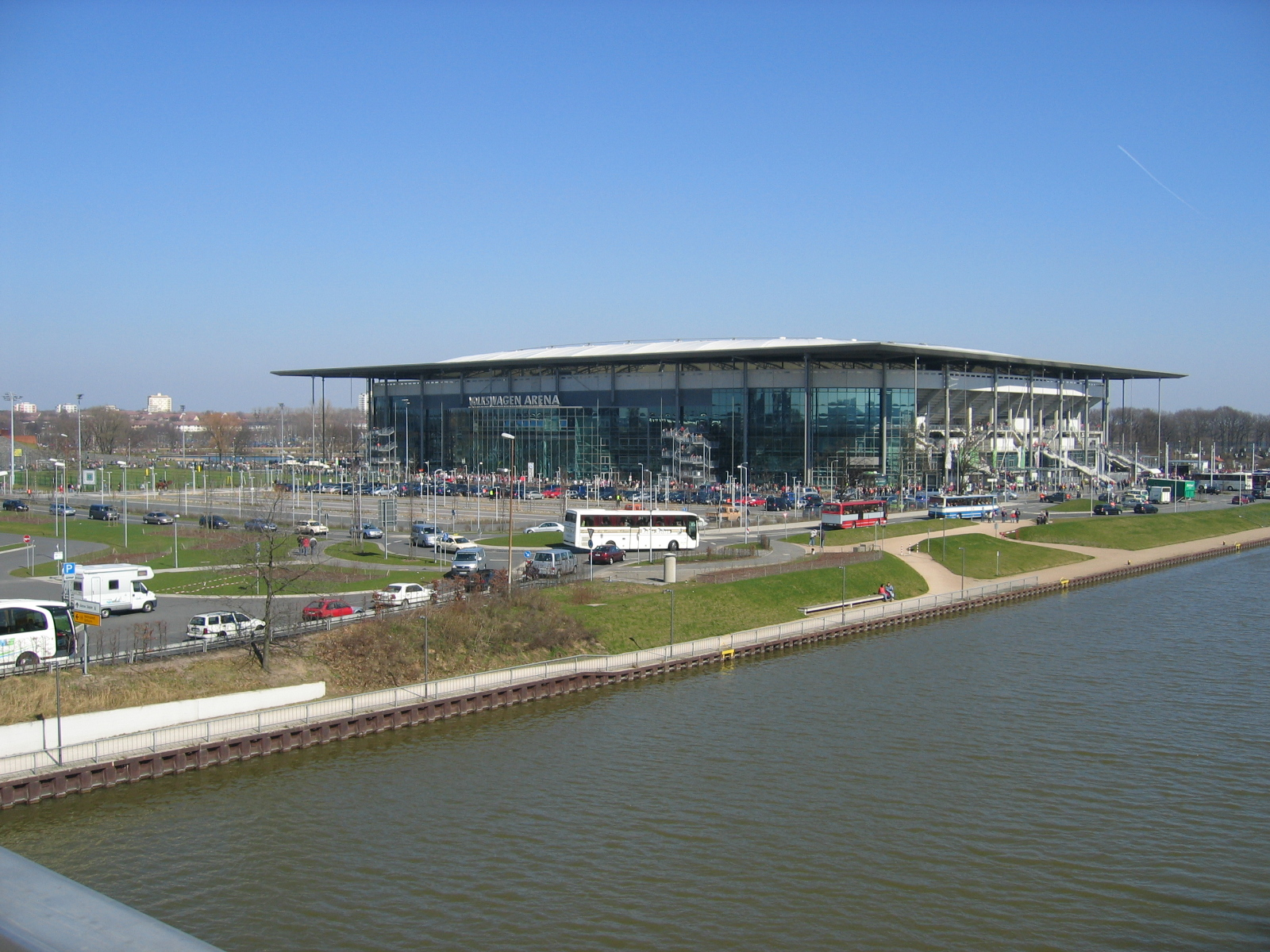
The Volkswagen Arena

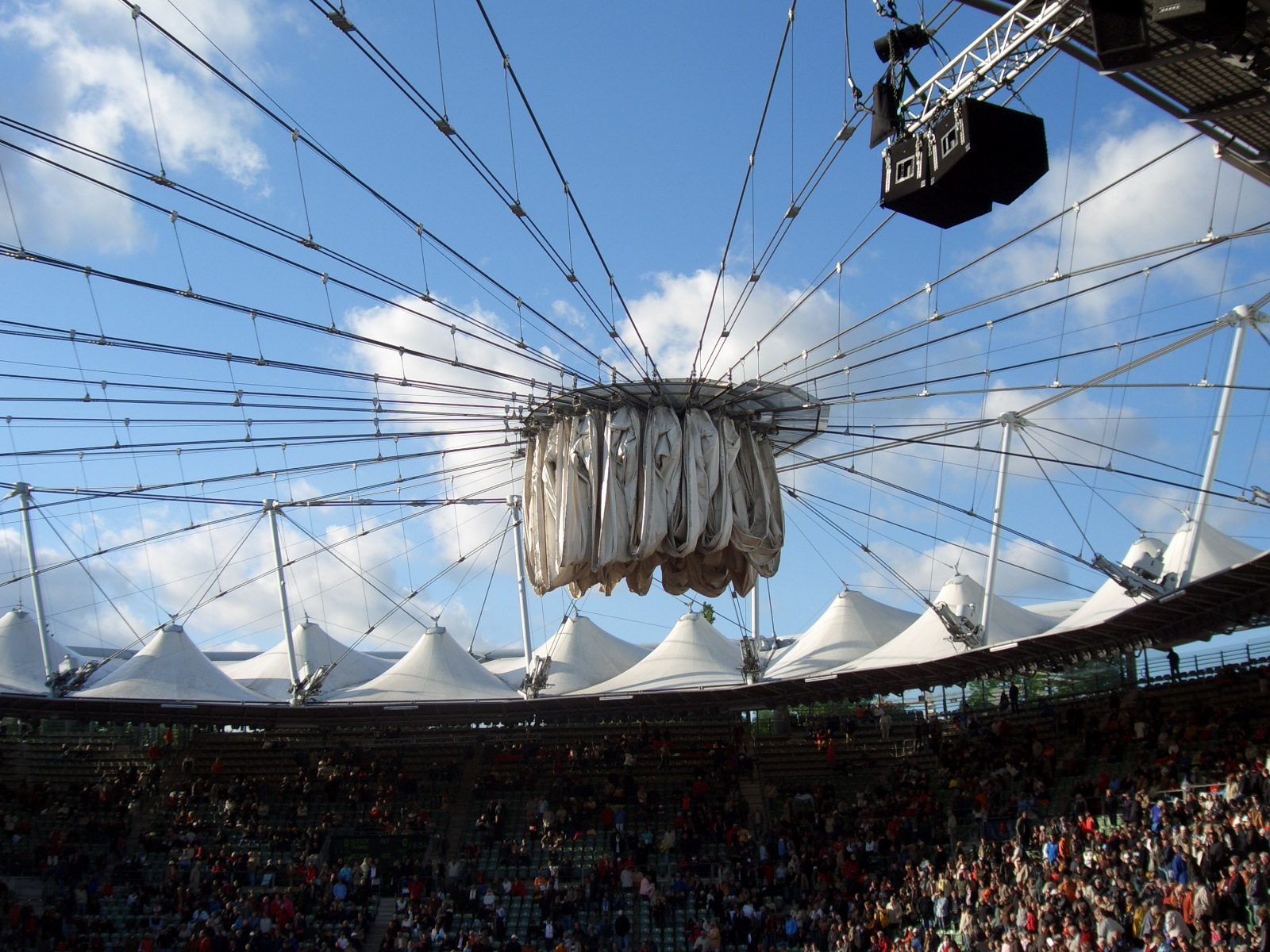
Am Rothenbaum tennis stadium

The German Football Association was founded in Leipzig in 1900. Several cities in Northern Germany have hosted matches of the 1974 FIFA World Cup, UEFA Euro 1988 and 2006 FIFA World Cup.

The Nordderby (Northern derby) is played between Hamburger SV and SV Werder Bremen, whereas the Hamburg derby is played between Hamburger SV and FC St. Pauli. Other notable men's football clubs include Hertha Berlin, VfL Wolfsburg, Hannover 96, Eintracht Braunschweig, F.C. Hansa Rostock, 1. FC Magdeburg. Hamburger SV won the 1982–83 European Cup and six German championships, whereas Werder Bremen won the German championship four times and Hertha Berlin twice.

In women's football, the VfL Wolfsburg won the Bundesliga three times and the UEFA Women's Champions League twice, whereas 1. FFC Turbine Potsdam won the Bundesliga six times and the UEFA Champions League twice.

Notable Basketball Bundesliga teams include Alba Berlin, Basketball Löwen Braunschweig, Hamburg Towers and EWE Baskets Oldenburg.

Notable Eishockey-Bundesliga teams include Eisbären Berlin, Grizzlys Wolfsburg, Hamburg Freezers, Hannover Scorpions and Fischtown Pinguins.

Notable handball teams include GWD Minden, SG Flensburg-Handewitt, TuS Nettelstedt-Lübbecke, THW Kiel, Handball Hamburg, SC Magdeburg, Buxtehuder SV, VfL Oldenburg and HSG Blomberg-Lippe.

Notable marathon races include the Berlin Marathon (one of the World Marathon Majors), Hamburg Marathon, Hannover Marathon.

Notable tennis tournaments include the Halle Open, International German Open and Sparkassen Open.

Other notable competitions are the Kiel Week, EuroEyes Cyclassics and the Hanse Sail.

The Olympiastadion in Berlin has hosted the 1936 Summer Olympics, 2009 IAAF World Championships in Athletics and Internationales Stadionfest.

The sailing competitions for the 1936 and 1972 Summer Olympics were held at the Bay of Kiel.

== Transport ==
The region has 5 main international airports:

- Berlin Brandenburg Airport (serving Berlin and Brandenburg)
- Bremen Airport (serving Bremen)
- Hamburg Airport (serving Hamburg)
- Hannover Airport (serving Hannover and Lower Saxony)
- Münster Osnabrück Airport (serving Münster and Osnabrück)

== See also ==
- Southern Germany
- Central Germany (cultural area)
