= Conrad Dasypodius =

Swiss mathematician

Conrad Dasypodius (1532 – 26 April 1600) was a Swiss astronomer, mathematician, and writer. He was a professor of mathematics in Strasbourg, Alsace. He was born in Frauenfeld, Thurgau, Switzerland. His first name was also rendered as Konrad or Conradus or Cunradus, and his last name has been alternatively stated as Rauchfuss, Rauchfuß, and Hasenfratz. He was the son of Petrus Dasypodius (Peter Hasenfuss) (1490–1559, or Peter Hasenfratz), a humanist and lexicographer.

In 1564, Dasypodius edited various parts of the Elements of Euclid. In the preface, he says that for 26 years it had been the rule at his school that all who were promoted from the classes to public lectures should learn Book I of the Elements, but there were no longer any copies to be had so he was bringing out a new edition so as to maintain a good and fruitful regulation of his school.

In 1568, Dasypodius published a work about the heliocentric theory of Nicolaus Copernicus, Hypotyposes orbium coelestium congruentes cum tabulis Alfonsinis et Copernici seu etiam tabulis Prutenicis editae a Cunrado Dasypodio. It is unclear whether Dasypodius was a heliocentrist himself or rather followed the "Wittenberg interpretation."

Dasypodius designed an astronomical clock for the Strasbourg Cathedral; that clock was built in 1572-1574 by Isaac Habrecht and Josia Habrecht. This monumental clock represented the synthesis of the most advanced scientific knowledge of the era, in the domains of astronomy, mathematics, and physics. That mechanism remained in the Cathedral until 1842, when it was replaced by a clock built by Jean Baptiste Schwilgué.

Dasypodius translated writings of Hero of Alexandria from Greek into Latin: one source says it was Hero's Automata; but more likely it was the Mechanica.

Dasypodius died in Strasbourg.

== Works ==
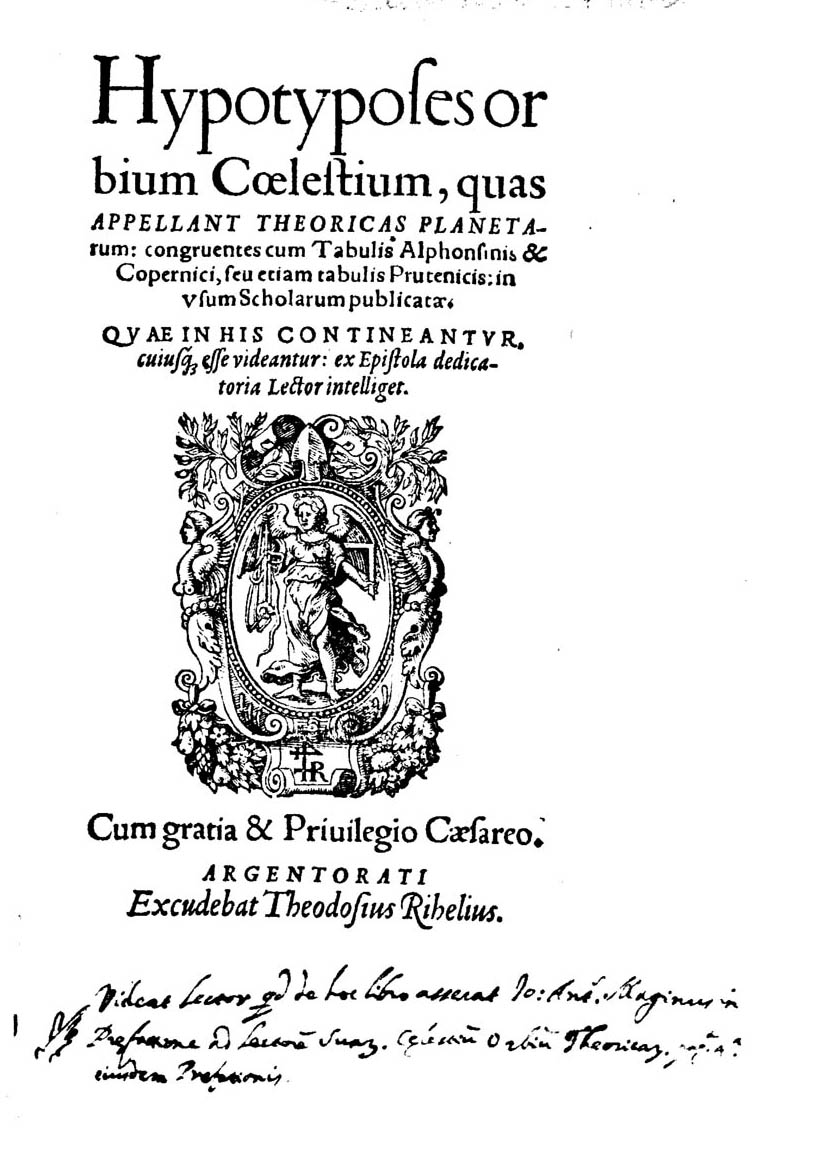
Hypotyposes orbium coelestium, 1568

- Euclidis Catoptrica (1557) link 1, link 2
- Euclidis quindecim elementorum geometriae secundum (1564) link
- Propositiones reliquorum librorum geometriae Euclidis (1564) link 1, link 2
- (collaboration with Christianus Herlinus) Analysis geometriæ sex librórum Euclidis (1566), impr. J. Richelius, Strassburg, link
- Peucer, Kaspar (1568). Hypotyposes orbium coelestium (in Latin). Argentorati: Theodosius Rihel. link
- Eukleidu Stoicheiōn to Prōton (1570) link
- Mathematicum, complectens praecepta (1570) link
- Eukleidu Protaseis (1570) link
- Euclidis elementorum liber primus (1571) link
- Sphæricæ doctrinæ propositiones Græcæ et latinæ : Theodosi de sphæra libri III, De habitationibus liber, de Diebus et noctibus libri II. Autolici de sphæra mobili liber. De ortu et occasu stellarum libri II... (1572), impr. Christian Mylius, Strasbourg link
- Lexicon seu dictionarium mathematicum (1573) (8 vol. 4).
- Kalender oder Laaßbüchlein sampt der Schreibtafel, Mässen vnd Jarmärckren [!] auff das M.D.LXXIIII. Jar (1573) (we don't know if it has been written by Dasypodius)
- Brevis et succincta descriptio Corporis luminosi, Quod Nunc Aliqvot Mensibvs Apparvit (1573)
- Ein Richtiger vnd kurtzer Bericht über den WunderSternen/ oder besondern Cometen/ so nůn manche Monatszeit/ diß 72. vnd 73. Jar zů sonderem Warnungszeichen diser letzsten zeit ist erschienen: sehr fruchtbarlich mit seinem Prognostico zůbetrachten (1573)
- Wahrhafftige Außlegung des astronomischen Uhrwerks zu Straßburg (1578) link
- Brevis doctrina de cometis & cometarum effectibus (1578) link
- Von Cometen und ihrer würckung (1578)
- In Cl. Ptolemaei de astrorum iudiciis (1578) link 1 link 2
- Lexicon mathematicum (1579) link
- Isaaci Monachi Scholia In Evclidis Elementorvm Geometriae (1579) link
- Oratio Cunradi Dasypodii de disciplinis mathematicis... (1579) impr. Nicolaus Wyriot, Strasbourg (1 vol. in-8°)
- Wahrhafftige Außlegung und Beschreybung des astronomischen Uhrwerks zu Straßburg (1580) link
- Heron mechanicus (1580). link
- Protheoria Mathematica (1593) link
- Institvtionvm Mathematicarvm Volvminis Primi (1593) link
- Institvtionvm Mathematicarvm Volvminis Primi Appendix (1596) link
