= Napoleon (card game) =

Trick-taking card game

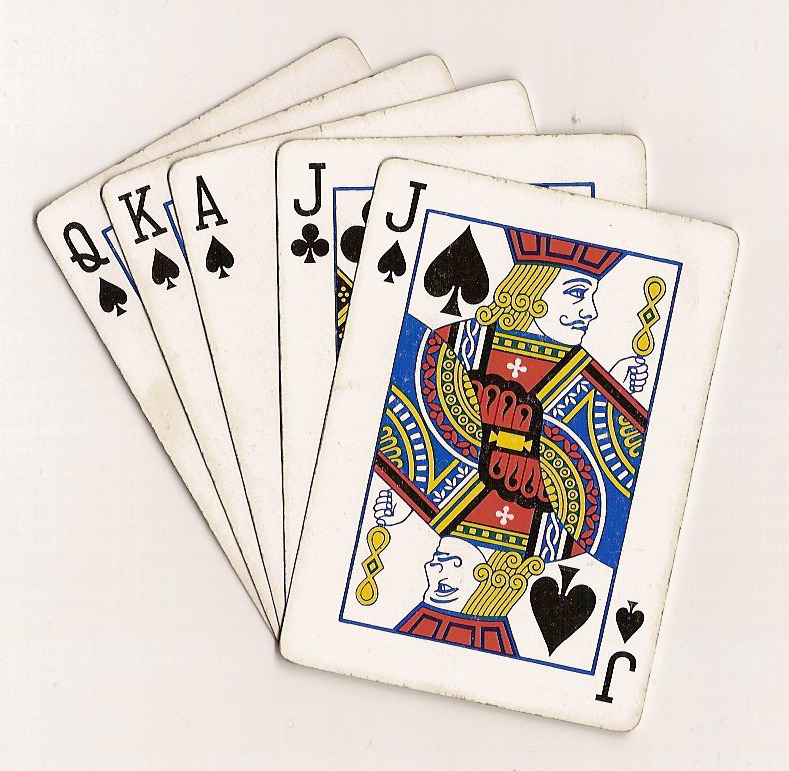
- Origin: England
- Alternative names: Nap
- Type: Trick-taking
- Family: Trick-taking
- Players: 3-7 (5 best)
- Skills: Tactics & Strategy
- Cards: 28-52
- Deck: French
- Play: Clockwise
- Playing time: 20 min.
- Chance: Medium

Related games
- Loo

Napoleon or Nap is a straightforward trick-taking game in which players receive five cards each and whoever bids the highest number of tricks chooses trumps and tries to win at least that number of tricks. It is often described as a simplified version of Euchre, although David Parlett believes it is more like "an elaboration of Rams". It has many variations throughout Northern Europe, such as Fipsen. The game has been popular in England for many years, and has given the language a slang expression, "to go nap", meaning to take five of anything. It may be less popular now than it was, but it is still played in some parts of southern England and in Strathclyde. Despite its title and allusions, it is not recorded before the last third of the nineteenth century, and may have been first named after Napoleon III.

== History ==
Rules for Napoleon, "a very spirited and interesting game", were first published in England in 1876. Another, shorter, rule set appeared in 1882 when it was described as "comparatively new" but "exceedingly interesting" and a "lively and stirring round game". However, an 1884 treatise claims that while Napoleon is "neither new nor unknown", its "popularity stands unrivalled" being played by "tens of thousands and yet remaining unchronicled". The 1885 American Hoyle claims that it is a French modification of Euchre. Hoffmann, in a very extensive account in 1889, introduces a number of variations, including the higher bid of "Wellington" and the bid of "Misery" to lose all tricks which ranks between three tricks and four tricks. That same year it is described in the French Revue Britannique as "very popular on both sides of the Atlantic".

By 1897, Napoleon had become the national card game of England, Foster telling us that "few games have become so widely known in such a short time, or have had such a vogue among all classes of society".

By 1982, this "English member of the Ecarté family" was widely played in pubs although, as Pennycook points out, this was technically illegal if played for money and the publican had not applied for a licence. For a long time Nap was Britain's national five-card game and, although it has declined in popularity, it is still played in parts of southern England and in Strathclyde, Scotland.

== Rules ==
The old game of Napoleon consists simply of five cards dealt out singly with the various players bidding in their turn how many tricks they think they can make. Eldest hand, the player to the dealer's left, has the privilege of bidding first, and then every other player in clockwise order may bid up to the limit, Napoleon, which is a bid to take all five tricks. Whoever bids highest plays alone against the rest and leads to the first trick, the card led determining the trump for that hand. The remaining players then play to the trick in turn and the winner of the trick leads to the next. The cards are not gathered or packed together, but left face upwards on the table in front of their owners, except for the winning card, which must be kept turned face down on the table. Players must follow suit; otherwise may play any card.

This is the old simple form of Napoleon, requiring only that the players judge the value of their hands regarding the number of players and any bid that may have been previously made.

=== Set-up ===
Nap is best for four to five players using a shortened pack of 28 from 52 cards. If four play, 28 to 32 cards are used, if five, 36 to 40 cards. When six play the dealer deals himself no hand, but pays or receives the same as the other players.

The cards in each suit rank from high to low (ace high). The dealer deals five cards to each player. Deal and play are clockwise, and the turn to deal passes to the left after each hand.

=== Draw ===
The players cut to determine the dealer for the first deal. The player with the lowest card deals first. The ace ranks below the two for this purpose.

=== Shuffle and cut ===
After the shuffle, the pack is cut by the player at the dealer's right. The cut must leave at least four cards in each packet.

=== Deal ===
Each player receives five cards, dealt in a round of three at a time, followed by a round of two at a time.

=== Bidding for four- or five-player Nap ===
The bidding starts with the player to dealer's left, and goes clockwise round to end with the dealer. Each player is allowed only one bid and it must be higher than the preceding bid (or a pass).

The allowed bids are as follows:

- Three - the bidder undertakes to win at least three tricks - most schools tend to not bother especially if money is involved
- Four - the bidder undertakes to win at least four tricks
- Nap - the bidder undertakes to win all five tricks
- Napoleon or Bonaparte - the bidder undertakes to win all five tricks by leading the lowest trump first
- Wellington - the bidder undertakes to take all five tricks by leading the lowest non-trump first

=== Play ===
The highest bidder makes the opening lead, and the suit of this lead becomes trump. The hands are played out in tricks with clockwise rotation. A player must follow the suit led if able. If unable to follow, any card may be played. A trick is won by the highest trump in it; if no trump is played, the highest card of the suit led wins. The winner of the trick leads to the next trick.

==== Scoring ====
Napoleon is usually played for stakes. An equal number of chips is distributed to every player. It is also possible to play for money (as in "Penny Nap", where each trick is worth one penny) A bidder who makes his or her bid, collects from each other player. It matters not if more tricks were taken than announced; the winner is only paid for the number of tricks announced. A bidder who fails to achieve the tricks bid, loses and pays every other player for the number of tricks announced before play.

- Less than 5: in the event of a win, the bidder wins 1 stake from each opponent for each trick announced; if the bidder loses, the bidder pays 1 stake per trick announced to each player.
- Nap: Bidder wins 10 from every player, or loses 5 to every player. Thus, playing Nap against 4 players, the bidder would win 40 chips (10 from every player), or lose 20 chips (the bidder pays 5 to every player).

==== Penalties ====
Failure to follow suit to the lead when able is called a revoke. A revoking bidder must pay all opponents as though the game has been lost. A revoking player must pay the bidder the full amount the bidder would have collected had he or she won. In the last case, the other opponents pay nothing. In every case, play is abandoned and settlement is made at once.

== Variations ==
Variations allow the following additional bids:

- Two - A bid to win two tricks.
- A joker may be added, counting as the highest trump, or in "Mis", as the only trump.
- Players bet 1 chip each deal in a cumulative pot. The first to bid and win 5 tricks takes the pot.
- After each player receives five cards, the next card is taken to be a floater. Players other than the dealer must bet 1 chip to look at the floater. Players can make bids with or without the floater (without is a higher bid than with).

=== Mis ===
Mis, Misère, or Mysery is a bid to lose every trick. It ranks between three and four in the bidding. At Misère, an adaptation from Solo Whist, there is no trump suit. The principle is that the bidder has to lose the whole five tricks, while his opponents make it their business to force the player to take a trick.

At some tables, trumps are recognized, determined in the usual way by the initial lead. However, this feature has doubtless been imported by players unacquainted with the original Misère and the method of playing it.

=== Wellington ===
A Wellington is also a bid to take all five tricks and overcalls Nap. The bidder must lead with his lowest value trump card when bidding Wellington and the game is worth double. Wellington can only be bid if another player has already bid Nap. It was introduced into the game by "card-sharpers", who, working in collusion, used it to systematically overcall "Mr. Jugging's" Naps, and the unconscious "Mr. Jugging", attracted by the pleasing novelty, introduced this modality among his friends.

=== Blücher ===
Blücher is a bid to win all five tricks. It can only be bid after another player has bid Wellington.

=== Sir Garnet ===
Sir Garnet consists of a hand in excess of five cards, dealt in the usual way and left on the table. Until this extra hand is appropriated, each player, when it is his turn to bid, has the privilege of taking it up and combining it with his own hand. From the ten cards held, the exchanger then discards five, throwing them away face downwards, and must announce a Napoleon on the remaining cards. The stakes are the same as for an ordinary Nap call.

== Variants ==
=== Peep Nap ===
In Peep Nap, an extra card is dealt face downwards on the table, and each player, on his turn to bid, may at his option have a private peep at the card by paying one penny, or higher stake, to the pool. When all have bid, if the winning bidder has "peeped", he or she has the privilege of exchanging a hand card for the table card. In the event of a Nap call, it is a rule to the advantage of the following players to peep also, as, if the bidder uses the peep card, they have thereby a guide as to what suit to save.

=== Ecarté Nap ===
Arguably the most interesting form of Napoleon. After the deal, and before any bid, the dealer goes round and serves out fresh cards from the pack in exchange of as many cards as the players wish to throw away from their original hands. For every fresh card, the players pay one stake to the pool. They must not exchange cards more than once in each round, but they can either refuse or buy any quantity up to five. The cards thrown away are not shown and are not used again till the next deal. In view of the extra cards brought into the game, Ecarté Nap should be confined to a table of no more than four players, and for the same reason the bids should be made on much stronger hands than the ordinary Nap.

=== Seven-card Nap ===
Each player receives seven cards. There is no exchange of cards and no peep. Bids of Wellington and Blücher are not permitted. The players may bid anything from three up to the lot (seven tricks). Misère is played at Seven-card Nap and ranks as next highest bid to Nap.

The order of bids with their stakes are:

- Three = stake of 3.
- Four = stake of 4.
- Nap = stake of 10.
- Misère = stake of 10.
- Six = stake of 18.
- Seven = stake of 24.

==== Scoring ====
- Misère: Bidder wins 3 from every player.
- Wellington: Bidder wins 10 from every player.
- Blücher: Bidder wins 10 from every player.

==== Penalties ====
- Misère: Bidder pays 3 to every player.
- Wellington: Bidder pays 10 to every player.
- Blücher: The stakes are double what they are in Wellington. Bidder pays 20 to every player.
- Sir Garnet: The stakes are the same as on the ordinary Nap call.
- Ecarté Nap: At the same stakes it will be found to be more expensive than the latter game, but a great deal more interesting.
- Seven-card Nap: Players losing nap, misery, six, or seven pay half stakes.

== Related games ==
- Brandle
- Euchre
- Fipsen
- Rams

== Literature ==
- _ (1882). Cassell's Book of In-Door Amusements, Card Games and Fireside Fun. Cassell. First published 1881, later 1886. London, Paris and New York: Cassell, Petter, Galpin.
- Arnold, Peter (1995). The Book of Card Games. NY: Barnes & Noble.
- Dick, William Brisbane (1885). The American Hoyle. NY: Dick & Fitzgerald.
- Heather, H.E. (1876). Cards and Card Tricks. London: The Bazaar.
- Professor Hoffmann [ Angelo Lewis ] (1891). The Cyclopaedia of Card and Table Games. London: Routledge.
- Morehead, Albert, ed. (1988) [1983] The Official Rules of Card Games. 10th ptg. NY: Fawcett Crest.
- Parlett, David. The Oxford Guide to Card Games. Oxford: OUP. ISBN 0-19-214165-1
- Pennycook, Andrew (1982). The Book of Card Games. London, Toronto, Sydney, NY: Granada. ISBN 0-583-12910-2
- Phillips, Hubert (1960). The Pan Book of Card Games. London: Pan. ISBN 0-330-20175-1
- Pichot, Pierre-Amédée (1889). Revue Britannique. Paris: Revue Britannique.
- Playfair, H.G. The Game of Napoleon and How to Play It. London: Simpkin, Marshall & Co.; Manchester: John Heywood; Glasgow: William Love.
- Routledge, George (1923). Hoyle's Games Modernized. Rev. by Dawson.
