= Schleswig-Holsteinisches Wörterbuch =

German language dictionary

Schleswig-Holsteinisches Wörterbuch (lit. 'Schleswig-Holstein Dictionary') is a regional dictionary of the Low German language in the dialects used in the state of Schleswig-Holstein, that is, Schleswig, Holsteinish and Hamburger Platt and their sub-dialects. The publisher and co-editor was the Germanist, Otto Mensing.

== History ==
With a newspaper appeal by Otto Mensing and his co-initiators in Schleswig-Holstein newspapers in 1902, in which the population of the state was asked to collect source material about Low German (Plattdeutsch) in Schleswig-Holstein and to send it to the initiators, preparatory work for the production of the Schleswig-Holstein Dictionary began. (Note: The area of the Prussian province at that time differed from that of today's federal state and, at that time, included inter alia North Schleswig and parts of today's Hamburg, but not inter alia the city of Lübeck, the Principality of Lübeck and the Principality of Ratzeburg.) Mensing attached particular importance to working out the linguistic peculiarities in the individual regions of the country; at that time he headed the so-called Niederdeutsche Sozietät at Kiel University, was appointed professor there in 1917, but only in 1928 for his extensive research of the Plattdeutsch language freed from teaching.

By 1906 the first book with the title Schleswig-Holsteinisches Wörterbuch was published by C. Donath, which only contained instructions for gathering information. Between 1925 (Note: "1925" entry among others according to Wachholtz Verlag, "1927" among others according to Kiel University; the year "1925" refers to the 1st issue, "1927" to the 9th issue that completed the first volume.) and 1935 the comprehensive People's Edition (Volksausgabe) of the Schleswig-Holsteinisches Wörterbuch in five volumes was published by Wachholtz Verlag. Among Mensing's employees were Gustav Friedrich Meyer and Peter Willers Jessen. In the years 1973 and 1985 the same publishers issued reprints.

== Structure ==
- Vol. 1 (1st–9th issue), 1927, letters A–E, 1074 columns (Note: Based on: Otto Mensing in the Low German Bibliography and Biography (Plattdeutsche Bibliografie und Biografie) database (PBuB))
- Vol. 2 (10th–17th issue), 1929, letters F–J, 1070 columns
- Vol. 3 (18th–26th issue), 1931, letters K–P, 1172 columns
- Vol. 4 (27th–34th issue), 1933, letters Q–S, 1024 columns
- Vol. 5 (35th–40th issue), 1935, letters T–Z and addenda, 906 columns

== Significant editions ==
- Otto Mensing, ed. (1927), Schleswig-Holsteinisches Wörterbuch (in German), Neumünster: Wachholtz Verlag, LCCN 36001317, OCLC 6605605, OL 6332496M, Wikidata Q131600190
- Otto Mensing, ed. (1985), Schleswig-Holsteinisches Wörterbuch (in German), Neumünster: Wachholtz Verlag, ISBN 3-529-04601-9, OL 12769087M, Wikidata Q131600293
