= Isaac and Josias Habrecht =

Swiss clockmakers known for building astronomical clocks

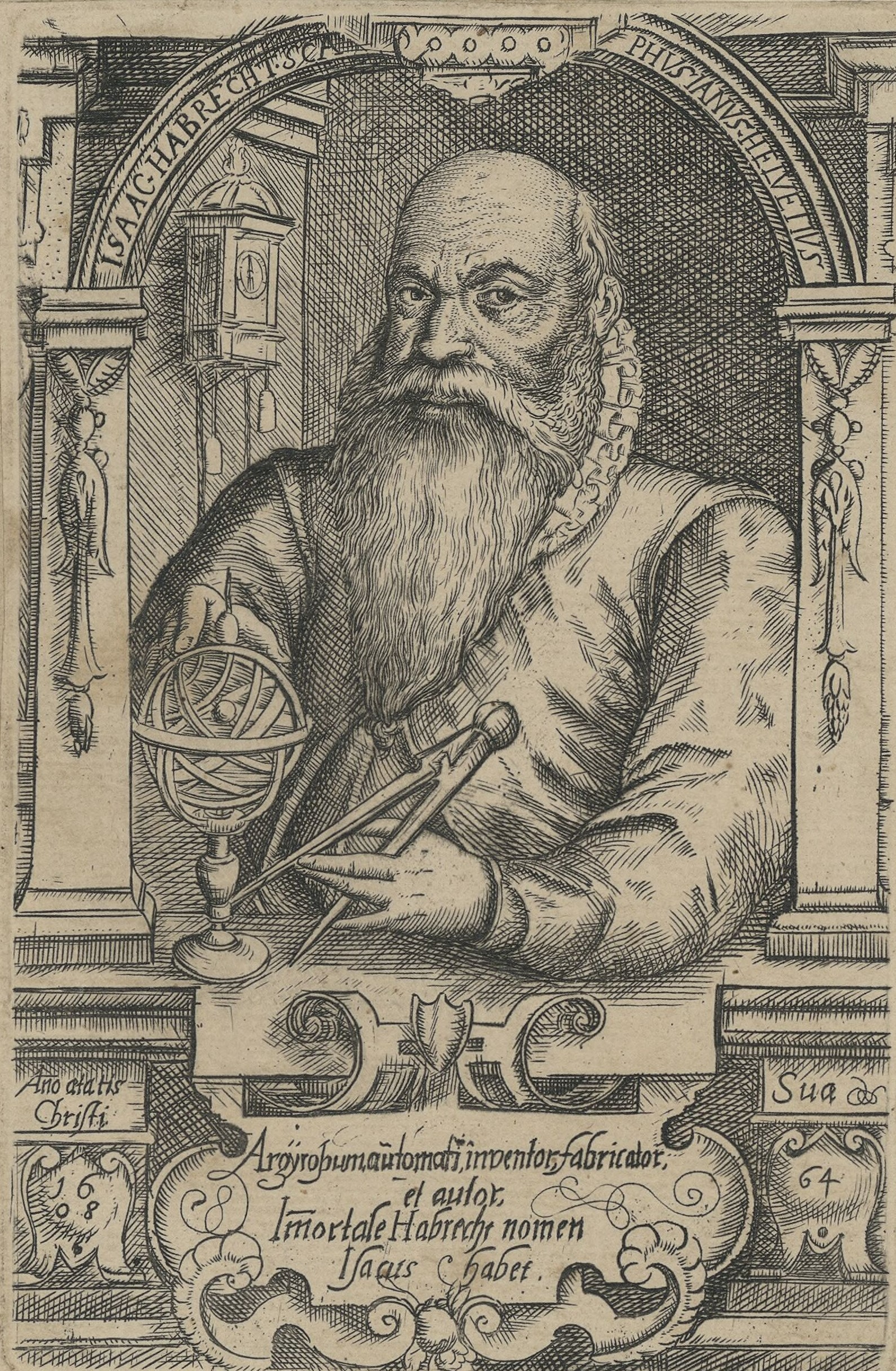
Isaac Habrecht (1608)

Isaac (1544–1620) and Josias (1552–1575) Habrecht were two clockmaker brothers from Schaffhausen, Switzerland.

They were hired to build the second astronomical clock in Strasbourg between 1571 and 1574, its design being created by Christian Herlin and later his pupil Conrad Dasypodius.

Josias and Isaac were two sons of the clockmaker Joachim Habrecht who built the astronomical clock in Schaffhausen.

== Joachim Habrecht ==
Joachim has also built a clock in Solothurn.

== Isaac Habrecht ==
Born 23 February 1544 in Schaffhausen, he died 11 November 1620 in Strasbourg. In 1566 he married Anna Rueger. In 1586 he married Margarete Beck.

== Josias Habrecht ==
Brother of Isaac Habrecht.

== Cultural references ==
- Habrecht is mentioned in Orson Welles' 1946 film The Stranger. Mr. Wilson, played by Edward G. Robinson, looks at the church clock and says, "I couldn't judge too well out front, but I'd say it was 16th century. Probably by Habrecht of Strasbourg." Charles Higham, in his book about Welles' movies, points out that it was not.
