= Josua Maaler =

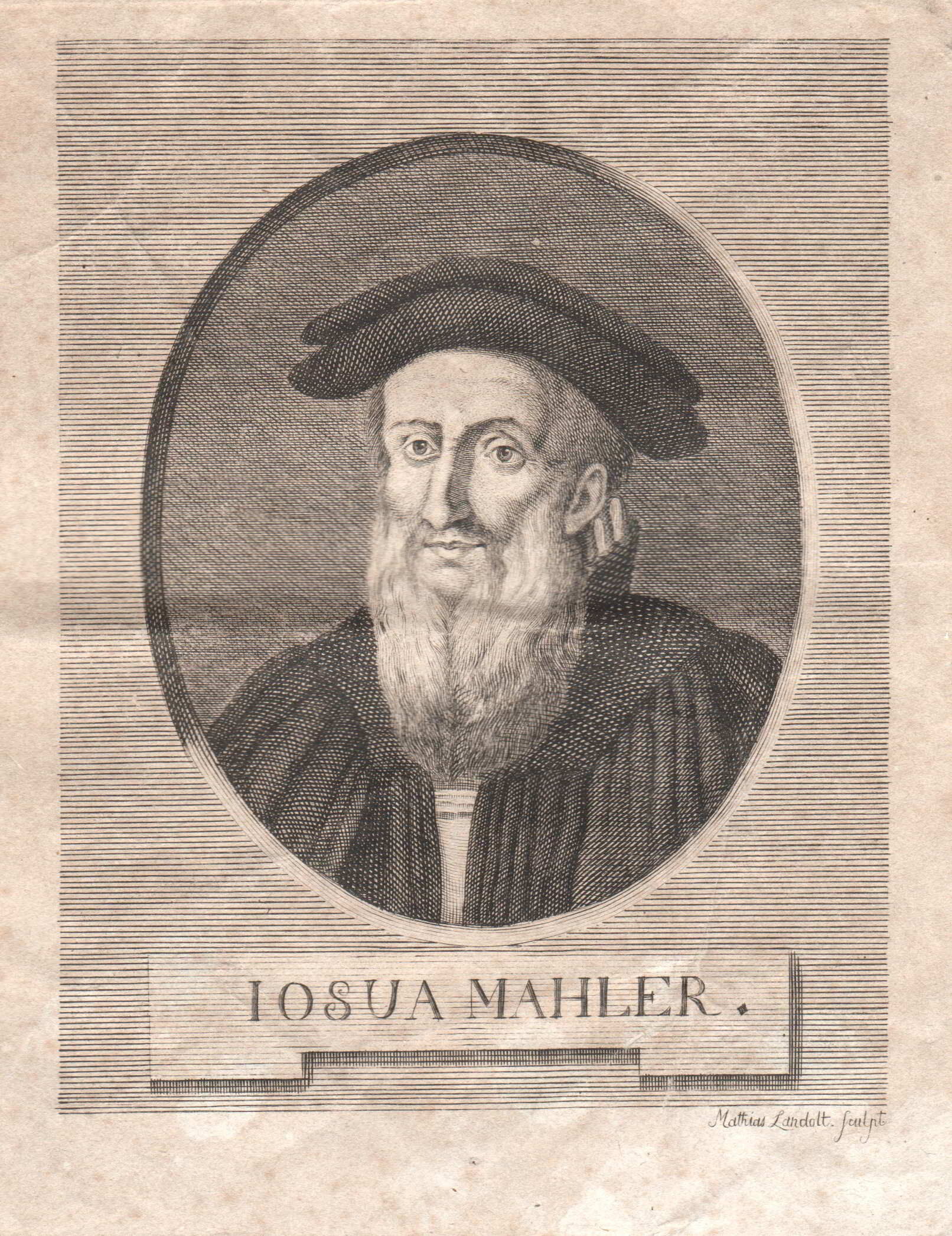
Josua Maaler (1529–1599)

Josua Maaler (also Maler, Mahler, Latinized Pictorius; 1529–1599) was a Swiss pastor and lexicographer. He was the author of the first dictionary which focused exclusively on the German language, published in Zürich as Die Teütsch Spraach in 1561.

Maaler followed the Dictionarium Latinogermanicum by Petrus Dasypodius (1536) in giving the German lemmas alphabetically, as opposed to the earlier Dictionarium Latino-Germanicum by Johannes Fries, which gave German glosses on Latin lemmas.

== Works ==
- Die Teütsch spraach: alle wörter, namen, und arten zuo reden in Hochteütscher spraach: dem ABC nach ordenlich gestellt, unnd mit guotem Latein gantz fleissig unnd eigentlich vertolmetscht, dergleychen bishär nie gesähen. durch Josua Maaler … = Dictionarum Germanicolatinum novum: hoc est, Linguae Teutonicae, superioris praesentim, thesaurus: in quo omnes fere Germanicae dictiones atque locutiones ordine Alphabeti enumerantur, et Latine ex probatissimis authoribus, quam proprijsimè purissimeque redduntur. a Iosua Pictorio Tigurino confectus, et in lucem nunc primum editus. Preface by Conrad Gesner. Froschouer, Tiguri 1561, reprint: Olms, Hildesheim 1971.
