= Petrus Dasypodius =

Swiss humanist

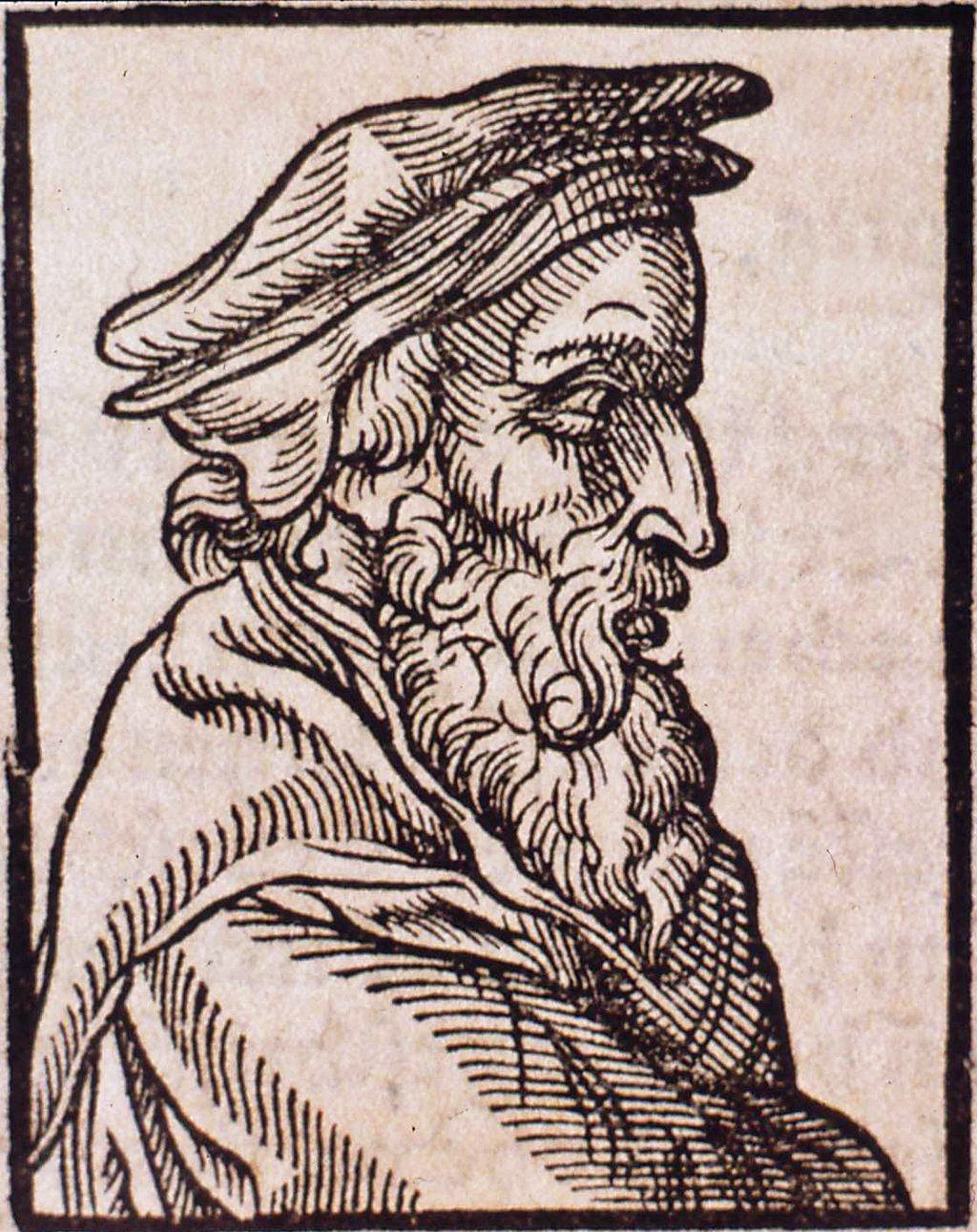
Petrus Dasypodius

Petrus Dasypodius (Peter Hasenfratz, c. 1495–1559) was a Swiss humanist. Born in Frauenfeld, he was a teacher and pastor in Zürich from 1527. Due to the Swiss Reformation, he was forced to move back to Frauenfeld in 1530. In 1533, he went to Strasbourg, where he taught Latin at the Carmelite monastery, and later at the Gymnasium Argentinense.

Petrus was the author of a number of dictionaries, Latin-German, Greek-Latin, Greek-Latin-German, Latin-German-Polish, Latin-German-Czech. His Dictionarium Latinogermanicum of 1535 is one of the earliest German dictionaries published. It was reprinted in Strasbourg in numerous editions until the end of the 16th century (ed. Rihel) and into the 17th. Reprints also appeared in Antwerp (Montanus 1542), Cologne (Metternich 1633), Amsterdam (1650), Frankfurt (Schönwetter 1653). The 2nd edition of 1536 was reprinted in 1974 and 1995 (ed. Olms, ISBN 3-487-05325-X).

Petrus was the father of mathematician and astronomer Conrad Dasypodius (1530/32–1600/1601).

== See also ==
- Josua Maaler
