= Otto Mensing =

German philologist, actor, artistic director and radio drama performer

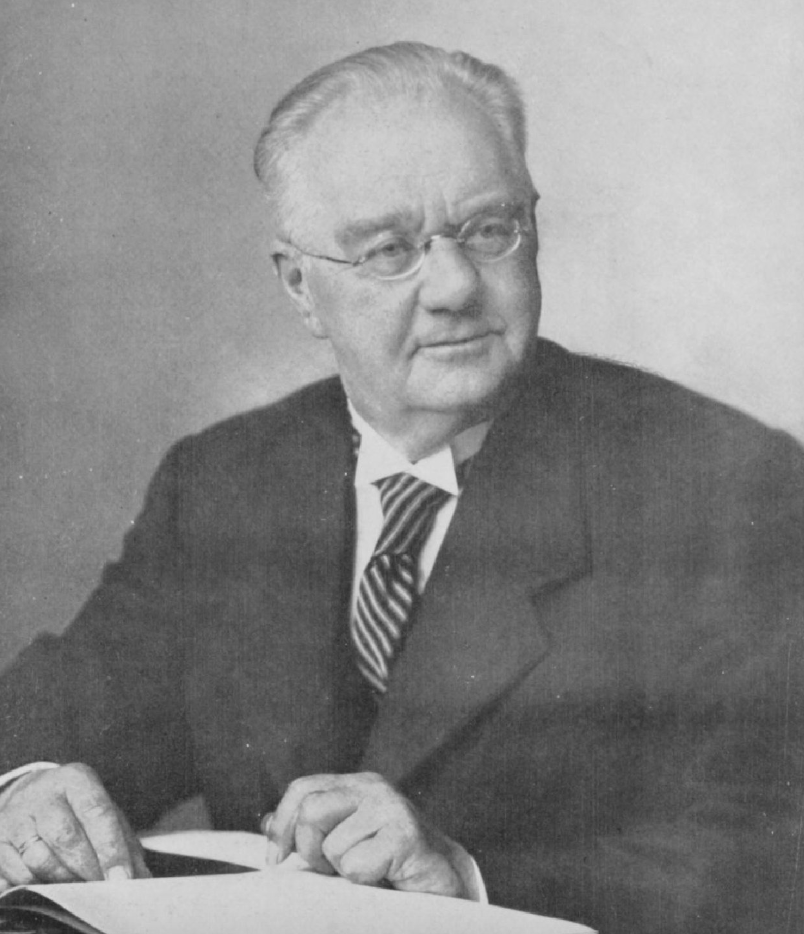
Otto Mensing

Otto Ludwig Theodor Mensing (1868–1939) was a German philologist, actor, artistic director and radio drama performer.

== Life ==
Mensing was born on 28 July 1868 in Lütjenburg in the Prussian province of Schleswig-Holstein, but moved to Kiel in 1903. As early as 1902, the preparatory work for a dictionary began with a call for information printed in various Schleswig-Holstein newspapers. The intent was to gather source material in Plattdeutsch (Low German) in Schleswig-Holstein and send it to Mensing. His Schleswig-Holstein Dictionary appeared in five volumes between 1925 and 1935. Mensing led the Low German Society (Niederdeutsche Sozietät) at Kiel University and was appointed professor there in 1917. In 1921, he founded the Niederdeutsche Bühne Kiel (Kiel Low German Theatre), with whose ensemble he appeared on Northern Radio (Nordische Rundfunk) as an actor and theatre director. He was freed from teaching in 1928 to concentrate on his Low German language research. In 1937, he was elected to the corresponding post at Göttingen Academy of Sciences and Humanities.

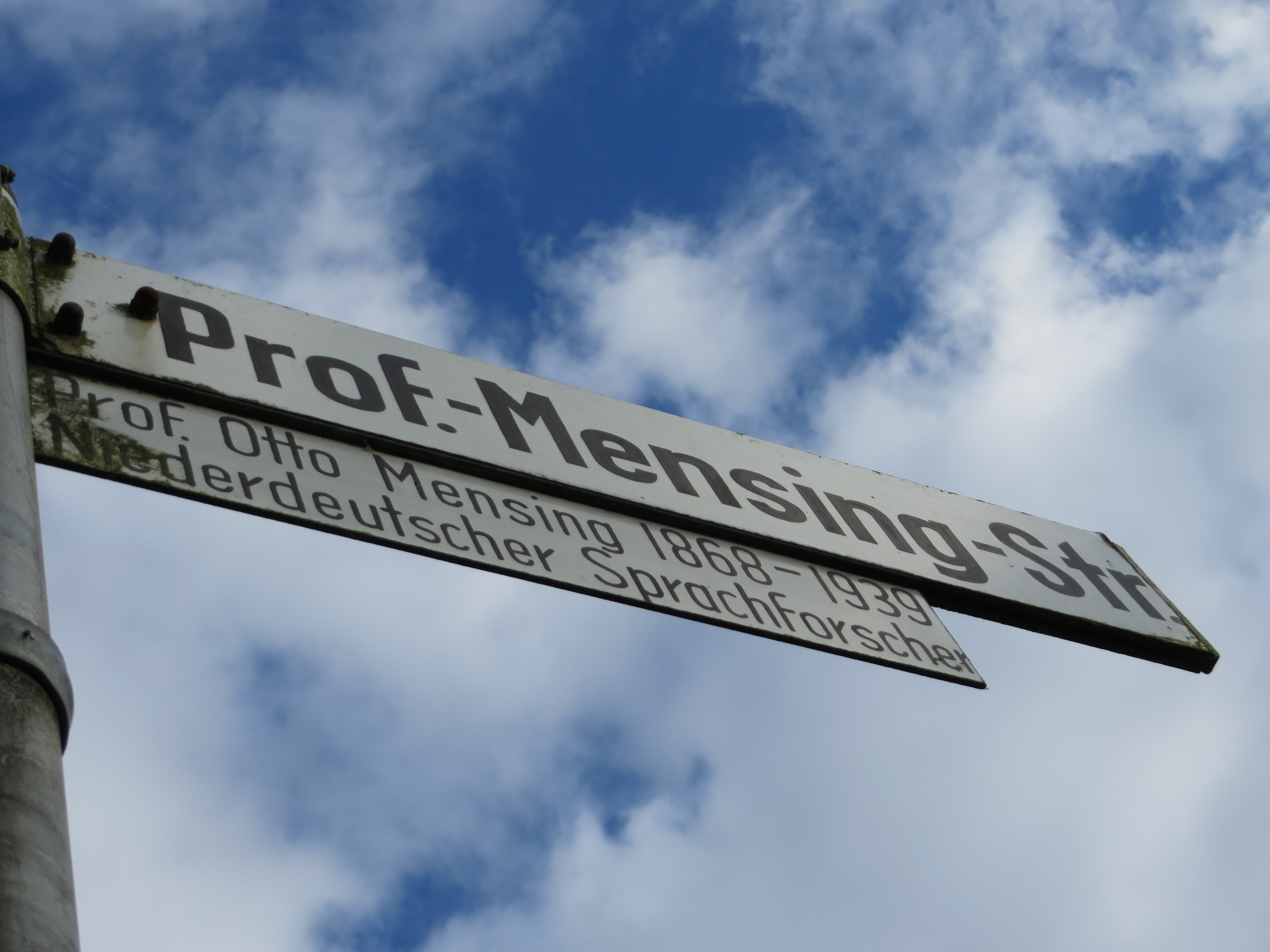
Street sign for the Professor-Mensing-Straße in Flensburg

In Kiel, the street named Mensingstrasse recalls the language researcher. In Flensburg the Professor-Mensing-Straße was named in 1959.

In 1886, Mensing became a member of the fraternity, the Kieler Burschenschaft der Krusenrotter.

== Works (selection) ==
- Untersuchungen über die Syntax der Concessivsätze im Alt- und Mittelhoch-deutschen mit besonderer Rücksicht auf Wolframs Parzival. Dissertation 1891.
- "Das Schleswig-Holsteinische Wörterbuch". In: Die Heimat. Monatsschrift des Vereins zur Pflege der Natur- und Landeskunde in Schleswig-Holstein, Hamburg und Lübeck. Vol. 14 (1904), Issue 7, July 1904, pp. 149–157 (digital copy).
- Schleswig-Holsteinisches Wörterbuch. – abridged edition, Verlag C. Donath 1906.
- "Das Schleswig-Holsteinische Wörterbuch". In: Die Heimat. Monatsschrift des Vereins zur Pflege der Natur- und Landeskunde in Schleswig-Holstein, Hamburg und Lübeck. Vol. 16 (1906), Issue 11, November 1906, pp. 261–269 (digital copy).
- "Volkskundliche Bestrebungen in Schleswig-Holstein". In: Die Heimat. Monatsschrift des Vereins zur Pflege der Natur- und Landeskunde in Schleswig-Holstein, Hamburg und Lübeck. Vol. 18 (1908), Issue 12, December 1908, pp. 277–283 (digital copy).
- "Das Schleswig-Holsteinische Wörterbuch". In: Die Heimat. Vol. 22 (1912), No. 9, September 1912, pp. 209–214 (digital copy).
- "Das Plattdeutsche in Schleswig und die neue Bewegung". In: Schleswig-Holsteinisches Jahrbuch (1921), pp. 76–80.
- Mensing, Otto, ed. (1927). Schleswig-Holsteinisches Wörterbuch (in German). Neumünster: Wachholtz Verlag. LCCN 36001317. OCLC 6605605. OL 6332496M. Wikidata Q131600190.
- Volkssprache und Volkskunde bei Theodor Storm. Flensburg 1923.
- Niederdeutsches Allerlei. Volkstümliche Vorträge. Neumünster 1934.
- De holsteensche Rüggeloeper und andere Flugschriften zum Schwedeneinfall in Holstein vom Jahre 1644. Wachholtz Verlag, Neumünster 1938.

== Radio plays (selection) ==
Type of radio play: broadcasts (edited radio plays) Type of broadcast: live broadcast without aircheck

- 1926: Wilfried Wroost: Peter Pink. Low German folk play in three acts (Peter Pink, unemployed worker) – directed by: not given (Nordische Rundfunk (NORAG))
- 1926: Jan Fabricius: Ünner een Dack. Speel in dree Uptöög (Vader) – directed by: not given (Übertragung aus Kiel – NORAG)
- 1926: Hans Ehrke: Dat Pastür. A comedy in one act (De Vörstand) – directed by: Otto Mensing (Single-actor evening by the der Niederdeutsche Bühne Kiel – NORAG)
- 1926: Gorch Fock: Cili Cohrs. Serious play in 1 act – directed by: Otto Mensing (Single-actor evening by the Niederdeutsche Bühne Kiel – NORAG)
- 1926: Hinrich Wriede: Leege Lüd. An amusing play in one act (Hans, Buer) – directed by: Otto Mensing (Single-actor evening by the Niederdeutsche Bühne Kiel – NORAG)
- 1927: Paul Schurek: Stratenmusik (Hein Dickback, Strotenmuskant, Baß) – directed by: not given (NORAG)
- 1927: Wilfried Wroost: Wrack. A Hamburg folk play in four acts – Speaker: not given; directed by: Otto Mensing (Kieler Niederdeutsche Bühne – NORAG)
- 1927: Hans Ehrke: Füer. A drama in four acts – directed by: Otto Mensing (Ensemble: Kieler Niederdeutsche Bühne – NORAG)
- 1927: Otto Franz Grund: Nestküken. An amusing play in 3 acts (Jan Wunnerlich) – directed by: Otto Mensing (NORAG)
- 1927: Adolf Feldvoß: Bornhöved. A Low German drama in one prelude and 3 acts – commentary and direction by: Otto Mensing (NORAG)
- 1927: Ottomar Enking: Dat Kind. Comedy in three acts. (De ol Knees, Rentjee) – directed by: Otto Mensing (guest play by the Kieler Niederdeutsche Bühne – NORAG)
- 1928: Fritz Stavenhagen: De ruge Hoff. Low German rural comedy in five acts (Hans Joachim Kummerow, Vollbauer) – directed by: Otto Mensing (guest play by the Niederdeutsche Bühne (transmission via Kiel) – NORAG)
- 1928: Ingeborg Andresen: De Roop. Play in three acts (Peter Lassen, Hofbesitzer) – directed by: Otto Mensing (guest play by the Kieler Niederdeutsche Bühne – NORAG)
- 1928: Hans Ehrke: Füer. Drama in four acts – directed by: Otto Mensing (NORAG)
- 1928: Paul Schurek: Stratenmusik. Low German comedy in three acts (Hein Dickback, Stratenmusikant, Baß) – directed by: Otto Mensing (guest play by the Kieler Niederdeutsche Bühne – NORAG)
- 1928: Heinrich Behnken: Versteekenspeelen. Low German comedy (Angelus Tobaben, ein Bauer) – directed by: Otto Mensing (guest play by the Niederdeutsche Bühne (transmission via Kiel) – NORAG) (three episodes)
- 1928: Alma Rogge: De Straf. Funny Low German single-act play – directed by: Otto Mensing (guest play by the Kieler Niederdeutsche Bühne (transmission via Kiel) – NORAG)
- 1928: Heinrich Behnken: Packesel. Funny Low German single-act play – directed by: Otto Mensing (guest play by the Kieler Niederdeutsche Bühne (transmission via Kiel) – NORAG)

== Literature ==
- Volquart Pauls: Otto Mensing †. In: Zeitschrift der Gesellschaft für schleswig-holsteinische Geschichte, Vol. 68 (1940), pp. XIII–XIX (digital copy).
