= Currant bun =

Form of sweetened bread

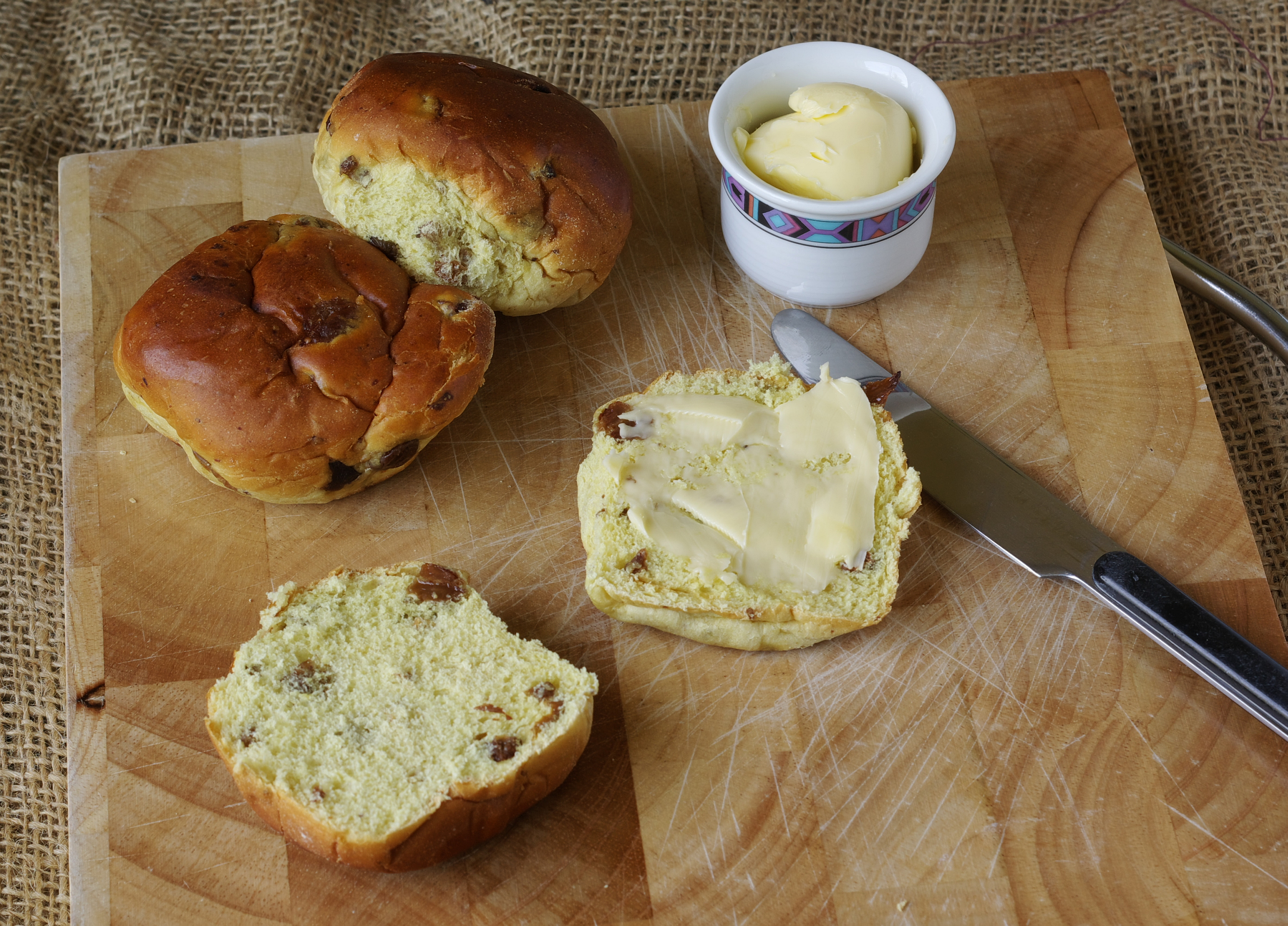
- Mini currant buns
- Type: Sweet roll
- Region or state: Northwestern Europe
- Main ingredients: Zante currant or raisins

A currant bun is a European sweet bun that contains currants or raisins.

Currant buns are different from the similar spiced bun, in that they do not contain spice. They are also similar to teacakes, but teacakes contain a mixture of fruit including peel. They are also different from scones, with currant buns made with yeast, while scones use baking powder as the leavening agent.

Currant Bun is English rhyming slang for the tabloid newspaper The Sun.

== Around the world ==
- Currant Bun - United Kingdom, Australia
- Krentenbollen - Netherlands.
- Rosinboller - Norway.

== See also ==
- List of buns
