= Johann Friedrich Schütze =

German author

Johann Friedrich Schütze, pseudonym: Jäger, (1758–1810) was a German writer.

== Life ==
Schütze was born on 1 April 1758 in Altona near Hamburg in the Duchy of Holstein. He was the son of Gottfried Schütze. He attended the Gelehrtenschule des Johanneums, the school where his father taught. From 1780 to 1783 he studied law at the University of Kiel and University of Leipzig and subsequently lived as a gentleman in Hamburg. In 1793 he was appointed as secretary to the chancellery (Kanzleisekretär) and in 1797 as the successor to Heinrich Wilhelm von Gerstenberg in the post of General Administrator of the Lotto in Altona.

Johann Friedrich Schütze remained single all his life and died in Altona on 15 October 1810.

== Works ==
Outside of his job, Schütze published a wide and large range of books. For many years he collected sources for the Hamburgischen Theater-Geschichte ("Hamburg's Theatre History"). This 1794 work was reprinted in 1975 and is a standard work. Schütze published many theatre critiques, especially of performances at the Altona National Theatre, which was experienced a brief success under the leadership of Johann Friedrich Ernst Albrecht from 1796 to 1800.

In 1800 Schütze published the Satyrisch-ästhetische Hand- und Taschen-Wörterbuch für Schauspieler und Theaterfreunde beiden Geschlechts. Also noteworthy is his Holsteinische Idiotikon. Ein Beitrag zur Volkssittengeschichte. Published in four parts between 1800 and 1806, the author had been writing it for many years. This book, with its Low German expressions and words, was reprinted in 1976. Schütze also published novels, travel reports and many articles in well known, contemporary periodicals. He worked for the Journal des Luxus und der Moden and translated from French and Danish.

== Works ==
- Hamburgische Theater-Geschichte. ["Hamburg Theatre History"] Treder, Hamburg 1794 (urn:urn:nbn:de:bvb:12-bsb10574638-7:{{{2}}}).
- Satyrisch-ästhetisches Hand- und Taschen-Wörterbuch für Schauspieler und Theaterfreunde beiden Geschlechts. Verlagsgesellschaft, Hamburg 1800 (Digital link).
- Holsteinisches Idiotikon, ein Beitrag zur Volkssittengeschichte oder Sammlung plattdeutscher, alter und neugebildeter Worte, Wortformen, Redensarten, Volkwitzes, Sprichwörter, Spruchreime, Wiegenlieder, Anekdoten und aus dem Sprachschatze erklärter Sitten, Gebräuche, Spiele, Feste der alten und neuen Holsteiner.
  - Part One. Villaume, Hamburg 1800
  - Part Two. Villaume, Hambuert 1801 (Erster und Zweiter Teil is available for free viewing and download at the Internet Archive).
  - Part Three. Villaume, Hamburg 1802 (Johann Friedrich Schütze is available for free viewing and download at the Internet Archive).
  - Part Four. Hammerich, Altona 1806 (Johann Friedrich Schütze is available for free viewing and download at the Internet Archive; urn:urn:nbn:de:bvb:12-bsb10584357-1:{{{2}}}).

== Literature ==
- Hans-Werner Engels: "Schütze, Johann Friedrich". In: Franklin Kopitzsch, Dirk Brietzke (eds.): Hamburgische Biografie. Vol. 1. Christians, Hamburg 2001, ISBN 3-7672-1364-8, S. 281.
- Carsten Erich Carstens (1891). "Schütze, Johann Friedrich" . Allgemeine Deutsche Biographie (in German). Vol. 33. Leipzig: Duncker & Humblot. pp. 145–146.
