= Johannes Fries =

Swiss theologian and lexicographer

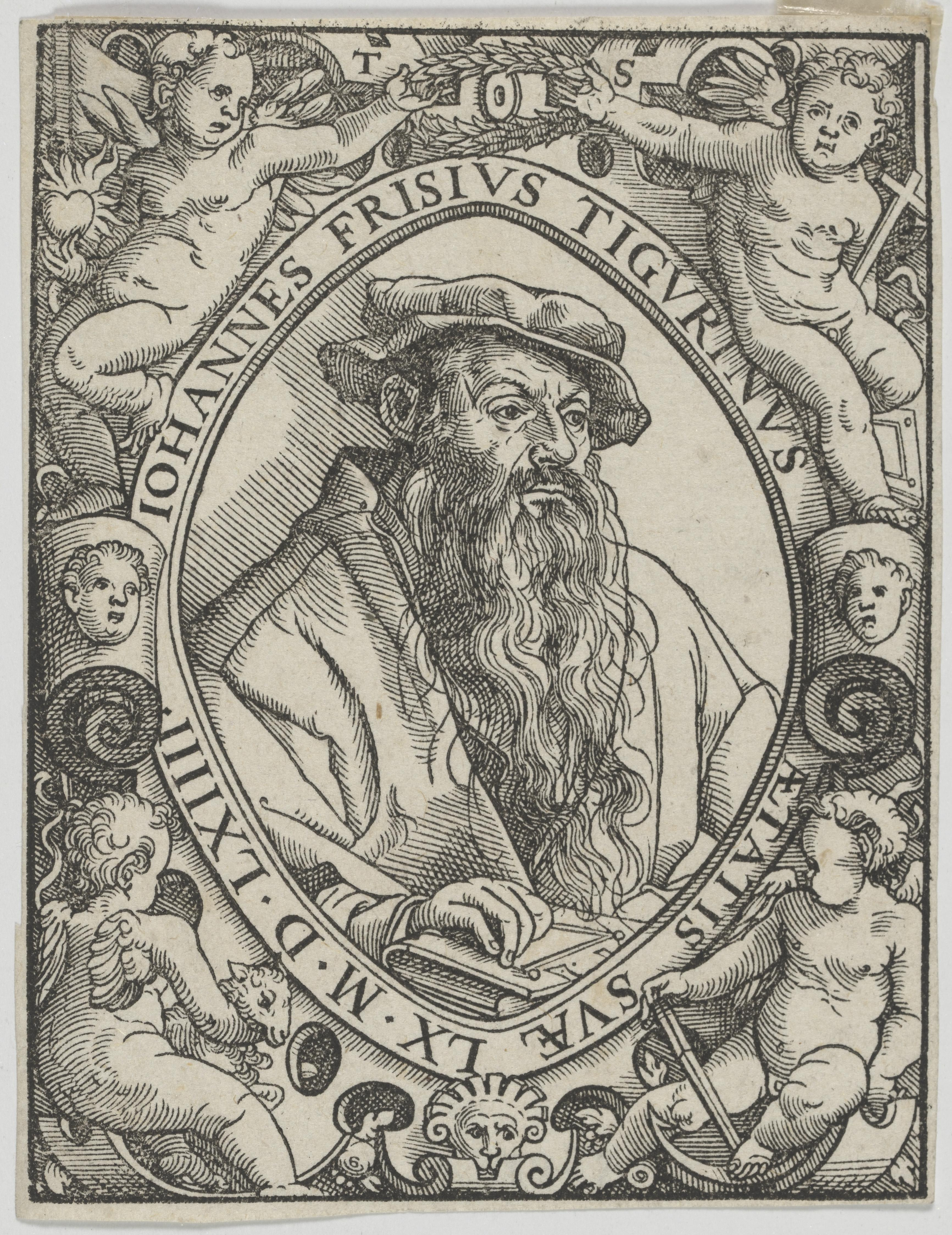

Johannes Fries, also known as Hans Fries, Hans Frisius, and Johannes Frisius, (1505 – 28 January 1565) was a Swiss theologian and lexicographer during the Reformation. He is also known for his work in music theory.

== Life ==
He studied at the cathedral school in Zürich during 1527–1531, on scholarship from Ulrich Zwingli. Along with Conrad Gesner, he studied music and philology at the University of Paris from 1533 to 1535. He taught Latin at the Fraumünster college from 1536 to 1547. Between 1545 and 1547, he traveled in Italy, in particular researching Latin and Greek manuscripts and studying Hebrew in Venice. He resumed his position in Zurich upon his return. From 1563 he was the head of the Grossmünster college.

== Works ==
He edited the works of various authors, contributed to the Zürich Bible and published a Latin-German dictionary (Dictionarium Latinogermanicum). In 1541, together with Peter Kolin (Petrus Cholinus), Fries translated the 1538 French dictionary (Dictionarium Latinogallicum) by Robert Estienne into German. In 1556, he published a greatly expanded edition of the dictionary, also known as The big Fries.

These dictionaries were alphabetized according to the Latin lemmata and lacked a German index, for which reason Jacob Grimm did not count them as German dictionaries. The first German dictionary which alphabetized according to the German lemmata was that by Josua Maaler, published in 1561. Later editions of Fries's dictionary did include German index; so Johann Kaspar Suicer, Joannis Frisii Dictionarium Latino-Germanicum Nec Non Germanico-Latinum (1701).

Fries was interested in both secular and sacred music, and published works on music theory, most notably the Brevis musicae isagoge (Zürich, 1554). This book included 24 settings of Horatian odes for four voices in strict chordal style, the tenors of which, according to the preface, were composed by Fries, with the other parts filled in by the Zürich Cathedral organist and singer Heinrich Textor. The classical poetic meters are strictly observed, leading humanistic schoolteachers to use them as examples.

In about 1540, Fries edited a collection of evangelical songs and psalms that included his own poem "Der hat ein Schatz gefunden" (based on Proverbs 31:10) set to the tune of "Entlaubet ist der Walde." The setting was popular enough to be frequently reprinted in Swiss songbooks through the end of the century.
