= Homme d'Auvergne =

French card game

Bête
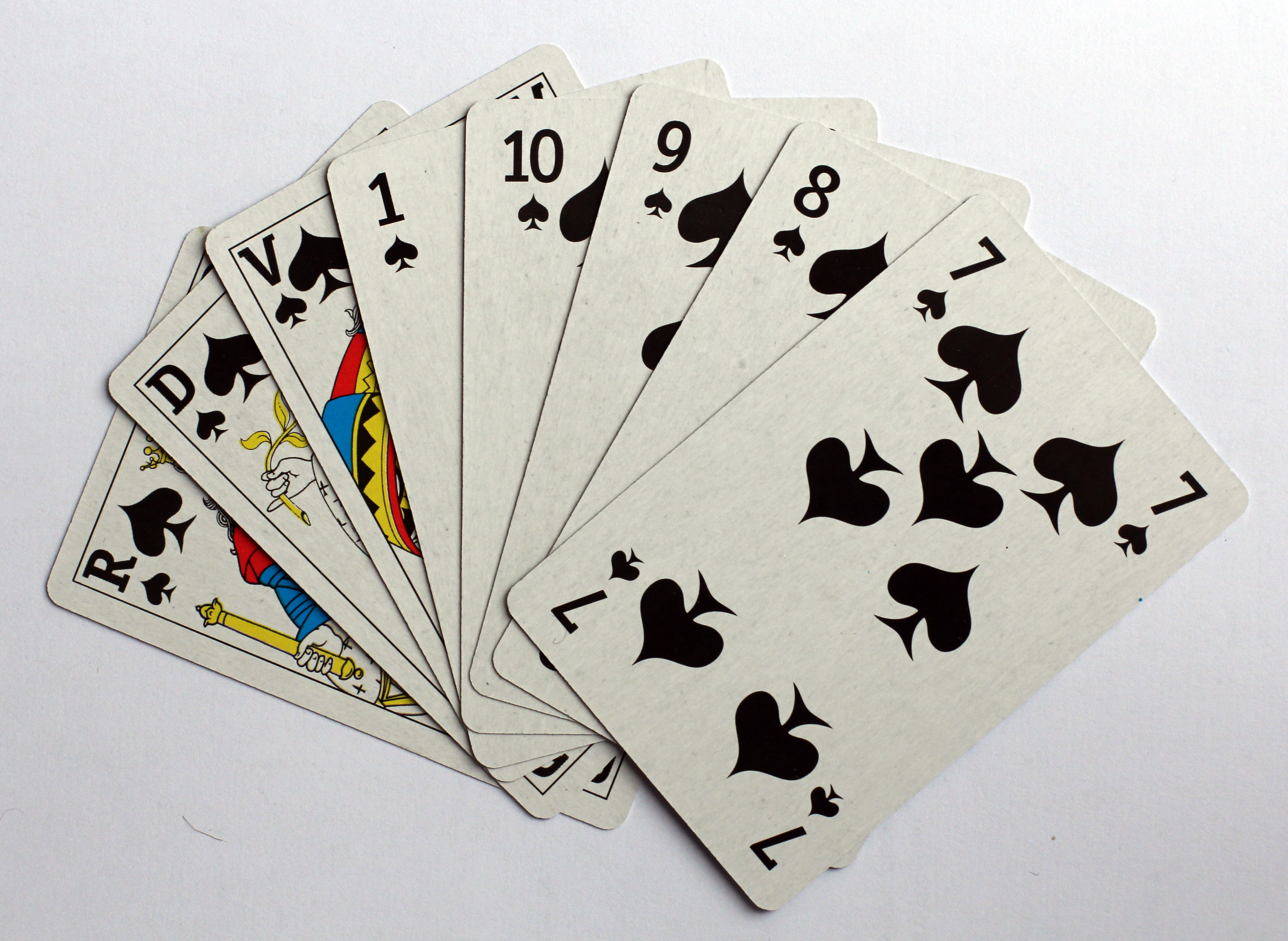
- The suit of spades, ranking as in Homme d'Auvergne
- Origin: France
- Type: Plain-trick game
- Family: Trump group
- Players: 2–5
- Age range: 12+
- Cards: 32
- Deck: Piquet
- Rank (high→low): K Q J A 10 9 8 7
- Play: Anticlockwise

Related games
- Bête, Homme, Triomphe
- Features: pot, 5 cards, up to 4 trump bidding rounds, 1 point for game and each trump King; precursor to la Bête

Homme d'Auvergne is an historical French card game for two to five players dating to the 17th century. It is a derivative of Triomphe and ancestral to la Bête with which it gradually become almost identical over time. It was a source of inspiration for other games, such as Écarté.

== History ==
Rudimentary rules for Homme d'Auvergne are recorded as early as 1665 in the Maison des Jeux Académiques. These early rules were copied and interpreted during the 18th century, often incorrectly, until the game eventually became almost indistinguishable from one of its descendants, the game of la Bête.

== Rules ==
Homme d'Auvergne is a game for 2 to 5 players. The following rules are based on a reconstruction by Philippe Lalanne of the earliest mode of play and published on the website of the Academy of Lost Games (Académie des jeux oubliés).

=== Cards ===
The game is played with a French-suited Piquet pack of 32 cards ranking: R D V A 10 9 8 7, where R is the King (Roi), D the Queen (Dame) and V the Jack (Valet). If 2 or 3 play, the Sevens are stripped out to leave 28 cards; if 4 or 5 play the full pack is used. The suits rank in the order: Diamonds, Hearts, Spades, Clubs.

=== Deal ===
The pack is fanned, face down, on the table and the player drawing the highest card becomes the first dealer. The dealer shuffles the pack, offers it to the left for cutting and then deals five cards each, anticlockwise, in two packets of 2 and 3 or 3 and 2.

=== Auction ===
In turn, beginning with first hand, players may choose to turn over the top card of the talon. If none does so, the deal is not played but passes to the right. As soon as any player turns the top card, a round of bidding to determine "the Man" (l'Homme) is initiated, starting with first hand. Each player, in turn, announces whether they accept the suit of the turn-up as trumps by saying "I'll play" or reject it by saying "I'll pass". Bidding ends as soon as any player bids to play or when all have passed. The winning bidder becomes the declarer known as "the Man".

If all pass, players may 'rejoice' (se réjouir) or 'go revelling' by turning the next card of the talon, known as the 'celebration' (réjouissance). Once again, players may pass or play. If all pass, a third card may be turned and another round of bidding takes place. Players may go revelling three times, after which, if all pass for a fourth time, the deal passes to the right. It does not matter if a suit appears more than once; players still bid and one may decide to play in a suit he or she previously rejected.

By bidding to play, the Man commits to winning the deal alone, as the declarer, against the other players, the defenders. Trump is the suit of the last turn-up.

=== Kings ===
A player who turns a King during the bidding phase immediately scores 1 point. In addition, a player with a King in the same suit as the turn-up scores 1 point. To do this he or she must reveal the King when it is his turn to do so or when a preceding player announces "play". (Note: Revealing the King is not mentioned in the original rules, but is recommended by Lalanne.) A King may only be scored once and may be scored even though the deal is not eventually played out. In theory up to 4 Kings may score if there are three rounds of 'revelling'. If a scoring King is later captured in tricks, the bonus point transfers from the original holder of the card to the player who captures it.

=== Play ===
First hand (right of dealer) leads to the first trick; thereafter the trick winner leads to the next trick. Players must follow suit; if unable to follow they must trump; if unable to do either they may discard a card of their choice. There is no requirement to head the trick.

=== Winning ===
The Man must make more tricks than any one of the defenders. He wins automatically if he takes three or more tricks. If he takes two, he only wins if no opponent makes three and if he is the first to take two tricks. If no player makes more than one trick, the Man only wins if he was the first to make his. If the Man wins, he scores 1 point; if he loses, he deducts one from his score and his opponents score 1 point each. If the Man loses when he has no points; he deducts one as soon as he scores a point.

Game is traditionally 5 points, but players may agree another target, typically 7 points. If played for hard score, each player antes a stake at the start of the deal which is swept by the winner.

== Bibliography ==
- _ (1665). La Maison des Jeux Académiques. Paris: Étienne Loyson.
- _ (1668). La Maison des Jeux Académiques. Paris: Étienne Loyson.
- _ (1702). La Maison académique, La Haye: Van Elinckhuysen.
- _ (1718). L'Académie Universelle des Jeux, Paris: Legras.
- _ (1721). L'Académie Universelle des Jeux. Leide: Pierre van der Aa.
- _ (1725). L'Académie Universelle des Jeux. Paris: Legras.
- Parlett, David (1991). A History of Card Games. Oxford, New York: OUP. p. 185.
