= Mouche (card game) =

French card game

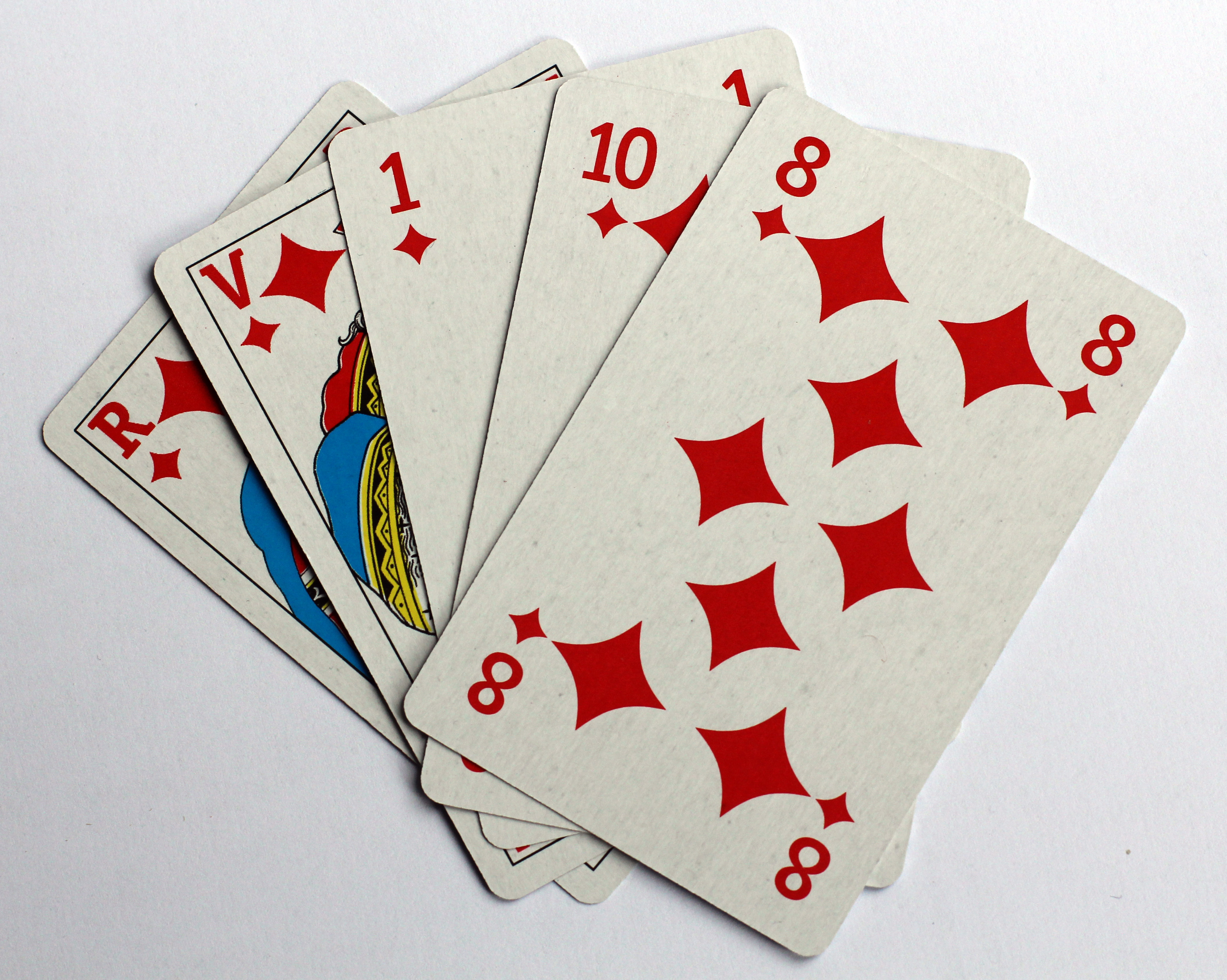
- A mouche - a flush of diamonds
- Origin: France
- Alternative names: Bête, Lanturlu
- Type: Plain-trick game
- Family: Rams group
- Players: 3–6
- Age range: 12+
- Cards: 32
- Deck: Piquet
- Rank (high→low): K Q J A 10 9 8 7
- Play: Anticlockwise

Related games
- Mistigri, Lanterloo, Rams
- Features: pot, 5 cards, no top trump, 5-card flush (mouche) as winning hand

Mouche, also known as Lanterlu, is an old, French, trick-taking card game for two to six players which has elements, such as bluffing, reminiscent of the much later game of poker. It is a member of the Rams family of games and, although it is a gambling game, often played for small stakes, it is also suitable as a party game or as a family game with children from the age of 12 upwards. It is named after the mouche, a term that variously refers to its winning hand, the basic stake and the penalty for failing to take any tricks. Although also called Bête, it should not be confused with the older game of that name from which it came and which, in turn, was a derivative of Triomphe.

== History ==
Mouche is first recorded in the Académie Universelle des Jeux of 1718, although Parlett implies that, from its terminology, it ought to be an ancestor of the English game, Lanterloo, which goes back at least to Cotton's rules of 1674, and that they are probably both descended from an early trump game, known as Triomphe. In the early 18th century, Mouche was considered a "most pleasant" provincial game that had yet to catch on in Paris. In the mid-19th century, it is described as being "very like Triomphe in the way it is played, but much more spicy" and as a game for the "petty bourgeoisie", a family game played before dinner.

Mouche also went under the less fashionable name of Bête ("Beast") in the region of Perche and its surrounding areas. However, Bête or Beste is also the name of an earlier, possibly antecedent, game in which there is no equivalent of the flush known as the mouche, but otherwise the rules are much the same. The term bête came to be used in both French and German as the name of the stake and penalty payment in a number of old games of this type and may be the origin of the word bet which dates to the same era. Another name for Mouche was Lanterlu, a term clearly related to the Lanterloo, although in the English game the Jack of Clubs is the top trump, a concept not found in Mouche but mirrored in its descendant, Mistigri, historically also known as Pamphile.

== Rules ==
The following rules are based on van der Aa (1721) with some additional clarifications from the Académie des Jeux Oubliés.

=== Cards ===
The game is played by three or four players using a pack of 32 French-suited cards. If three play, the Sevens are removed. The cards follow the Écarté scheme, ranking from highest to lowest as follows: K Q J A 10 9 8 7.

=== Tokens ===
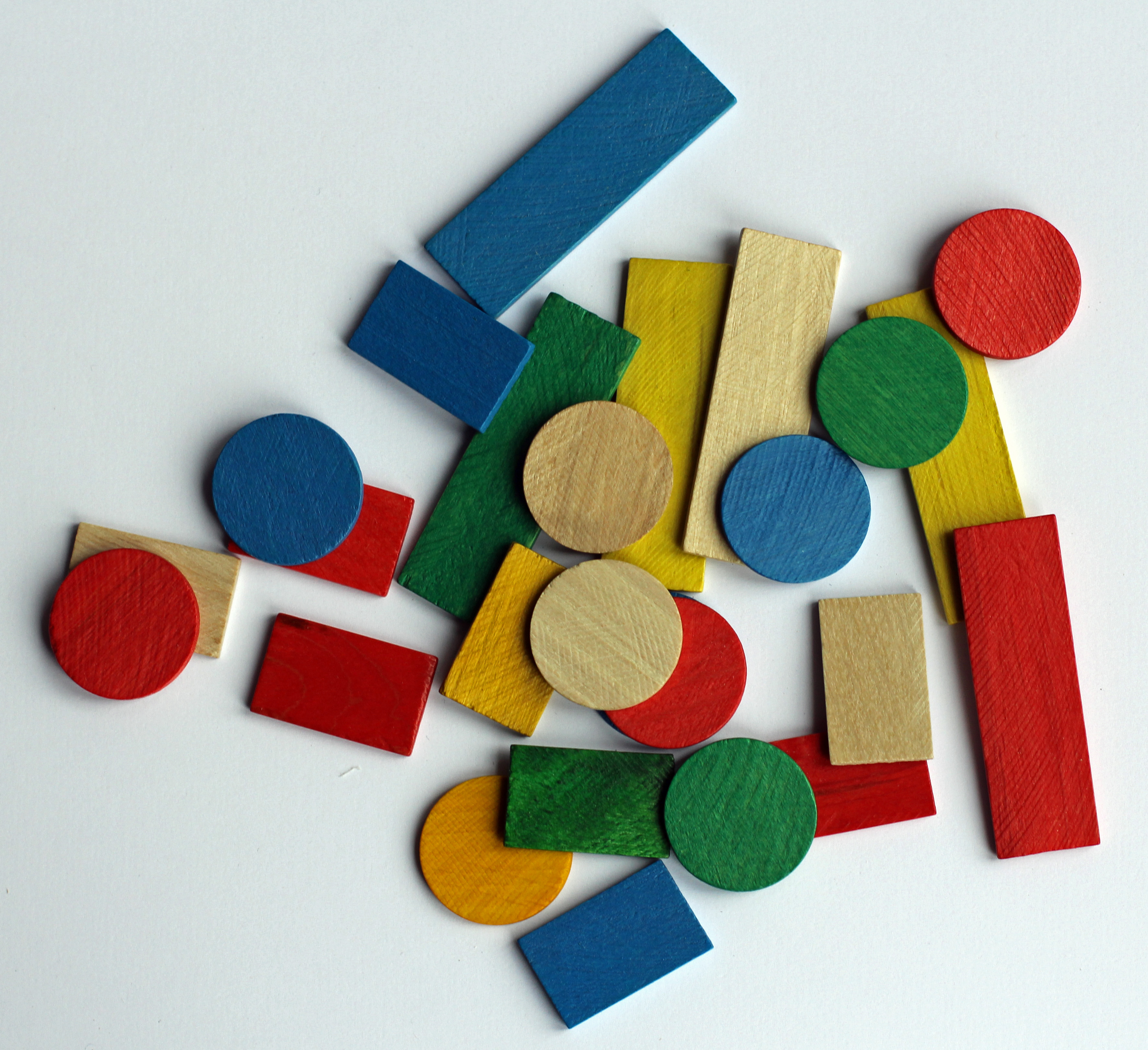
Coloured wooden tokens of the type used in Mouche: jetons (round), fiches (long) and contrats (short)

Tokens or chips are used for scoring. According to the Academie des Jeux Oubliés, at the start of the game each player takes 20 jetons (round), 16 fiches (long rectangular) and 9 contrats (short rectangular). A fiche was worth 5 jetons and a contrat was worth 100 jetons.

=== Dealing and declarations ===
The first dealer is chosen by lot; the player drawing the agreed card (e.g. a King) dealing first. Deal and play are anti-clockwise. The dealer antes 5 jetons to the pot before dealing each player five cards. These may be dealt either as 2+2+1, 3+2, 2+3 or 2+1+2 as the dealer wishes, but the method should not be changed during a game. The dealer then turns the next card as trumps leaving it face up on the table, and places the remaining cards face down to form the talon.

Players then decide whether they will pass, exchange a number of cards from one to five or 'stick' with the cards in their hand. If they pass, they just lay their hand, face down, on the table and take no further part in the deal. If they want to exchange cards, they select their discards and place them face down on the table announcing the number of cards being exchanged e.g. "all cards", "four cards", etc. The dealer then places the discards on the table face to his right and gives the player the same number of cards from the top of the talon.

A player who has a good hand, may stick by saying e.g. "I'll take it" ("je m'y tiens") and not exchange any cards. Players must play after sticking or exchanging cards.

=== Mouche ===
A player dealt five cards of the same suit in the initial deal, 'has the mouche ' and wins immediately without further play, sweeping the pool (the mouche). The player does not have to declare it straight away but may 'save the mouche' by announcing the intention to stick. This may be advantageous since, once the mouche is declared, any remaining players will pass in order to avoid making the mouche (i.e. paying a penalty equal to the pool). The player who has the mouche must declare it before trick play starts.

Players are allowed to question someone who sticks by saying e.g. "are you saving the mouche?" The player so questioned does not have to respond. Silence is taken as a "yes", but a questioned player who speaks is expected to bluff and be evasive, but may not lie.

If two or more have the mouche, a trump mouche beats a plain suit mouche and a higher-scoring plain suit mouche beats one worth fewer points. To calculate the value of such a hand, court cards and Aces score 10 and the remaining cards score their face value. If two hands score the same, the player with positional priority wins (i.e. the one nearest the dealer's right).

=== Playing ===
If no-one has the mouche, once everyone has had the chance to stick or exchange cards, play begins with the eldest hand (premier en cartes) leading to the first trick. Players must follow suit or trump and overtrump if unable to follow. If they can neither follow nor trump they may discard. In addition, if a player is unable to beat an earlier trump, they may discard.

=== Winning ===
Players earn 1/5 of the pool for each trick taken. If a player wins all five tricks they "take the mouche", i.e. sweep the pool. A player who fails to take a trick must "make the mouche" i.e. pay a penalty equal to the amount of the current pool into the basket which is played for in the next deal along with the dealer's ante.

In order to stop the amount in the pool escalating too far, players may agree to cap the mouche so e.g. if there are 40 jetons in the basket and the cap is 20 jetons, a player making a mouche only pays a 20 jeton penalty. Alternatively they may agree that, if two or more players make a mouche during one deal, their penalties are paid in successive deals rather than both into the next deal.

== Terminology ==
The term mouche is used in various ways as follows:

- Mouche:
  1. the contents of the basket or pool. The mouche may be single or multiple.
  2. a penalty payment equal to the contents of the current basket
  3. a flush comprising five cards of the same suit (without exchanging)
- Mouche piquante: multiple mouche
- Have the mouche (avoir la mouche): to have five cards of the same suit in one's hand (without exchanging)
- Make the mouche (faire la mouche): to incur a penalty equal to the contents of the basket
- Take the mouche (prendre la mouche): to sweep the pool i.e. to win the contents of the basket

== Literature ==
- Depaulis, Thierry (1987). "Un peu de lumière sur l'Hombre" in the Journal of the International Playing Card Society, xiv (Nov 1987).
- Parlett, David (1990). A History of Card Games, OUP, Oxford. ISBN 0-19-282905-X
- Van der Aa, Pierre (1721). La Plus Nouvelle Academie Universelle des Jeux. Vol. 1. Leide.
- Van Tenac, Charles and Delanque (1858). Almanach-Manuel des Jeux d’Imperiale, Triomphe, Mouche, Ambigu, Nain Jaune, Mariage, Rams, Vingt et Un, Loterie, Tontine, etc. Passard, Paris.
