= Piquet =

Card game

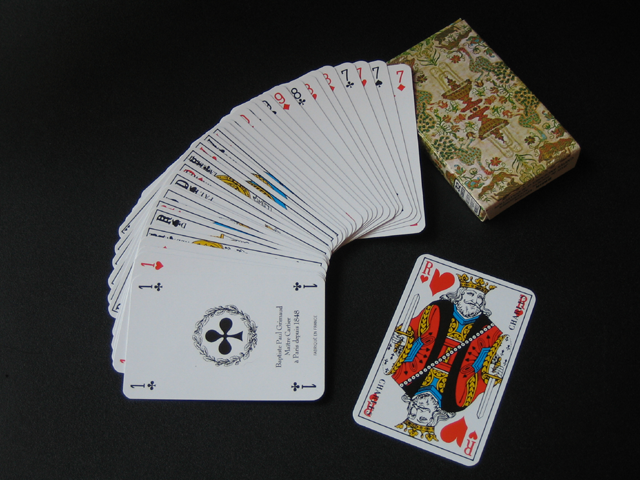
- French Piquet pack
- Origin: France
- Type: Trick-taking
- Players: 2
- Cards: 32
- Deck: Piquet (subset of French pack)
- Rank (high→low): A, K, Q, J, 10, 9, 8, 7

Related games
- Écarté

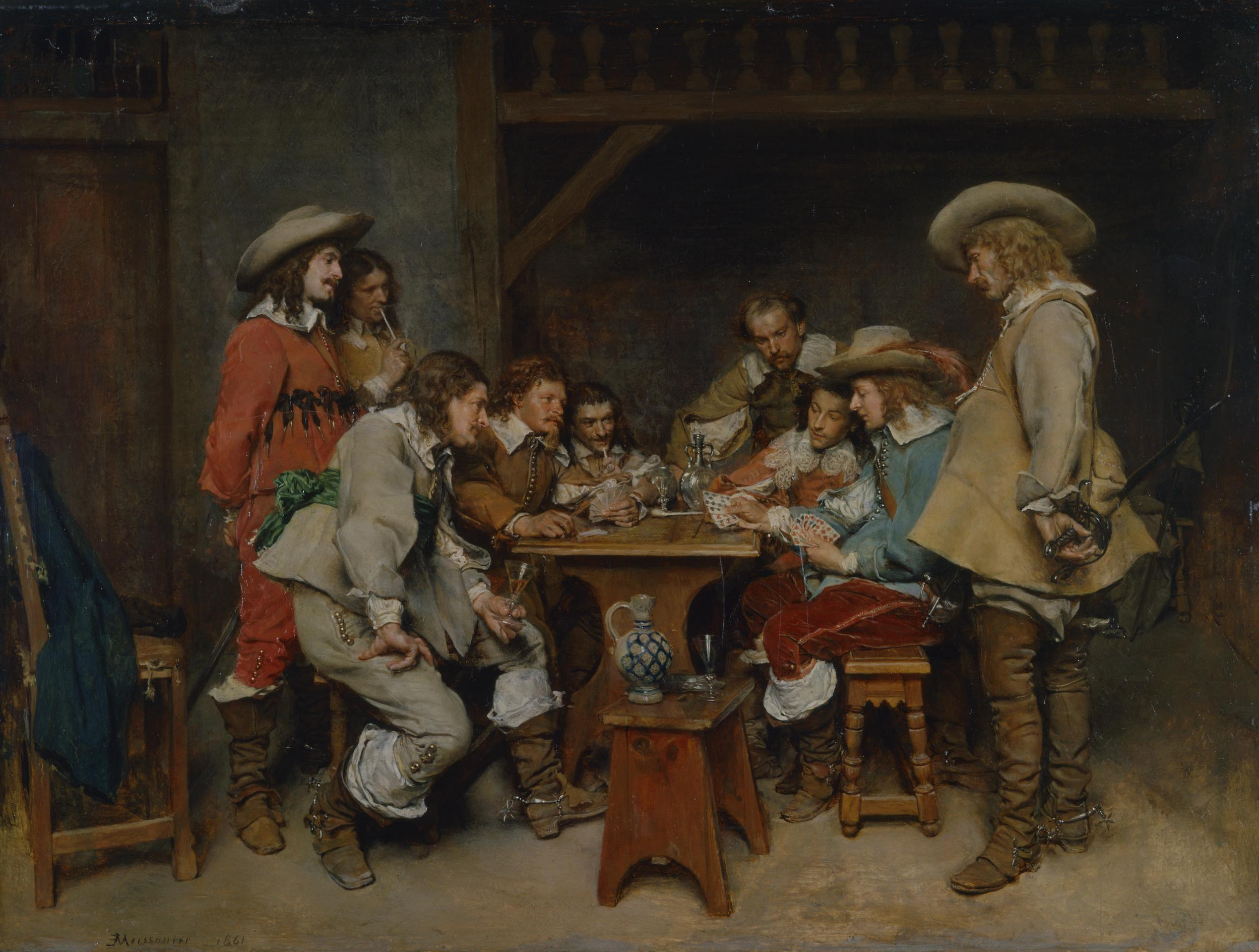
A Game of Piquet, imaginary 17th century scene painted in 1861 by Jean-Louis-Ernest Meissonier (1815–1891), National Museum of Wales

Piquet (/pɪˈkɛt/; French pronunciation: [pikɛ]) is an early 16th-century plain-trick card game for two players that became France's national game. David Parlett calls it a "classic game of relatively great antiquity... still one of the most skill-rewarding card games for two" but one which is now only played by "aficionados and connoisseurs." The game is historically also known as Sant or Saunt, from the French Cent.

== History ==
Piquet is one of the oldest card games still being played. It is first mentioned, as Le Cent, in a written reference dating to 1535, in Gargantua and Pantagruel by Rabelais. Although legend attributes the game's creation to Stephen de Vignolles, also known as La Hire, a knight in the service of Charles VII during the Hundred Years' War, it may possibly have come into France from Spain because the words "pique" and "repique", the main features of the game, are of Spanish origin. The earliest clear mention of the game – leaving aside various predecessors – is in 1585 by Jacques Perrache, described as a "Provençal gentleman", who refers to two unusual games, "premieres, & piquets".

The game was introduced in Germany during the Thirty Years' War, and texts of that period provide substantial evidence of its vogue, like the metaphorical use of the word "repique" in the 1634–8 political poem Allamodisch Picket Spiel ("Piquet Game à la mode"), which reflects the growing popularity of the game at that time. As with other games like Bête, the substantive form of the word "piquet" was turned into a verb and this is used substantially by Rist's 1640 Spiele, die man Picquetten heißet, who gives the word his grudging assent. Historical sources also distinguish between Rummel-Piquet, the normal game in which Rummel referred to the feature of point, and Offenherziges Piquet (lit.: "Open-hearted Piquet"), which was played ouverte. Mizka states that the former was known as Ronfelspiel (French: Ronfler) until 1664.

Until the early twentieth century, piquet was perhaps the most popular card game in France, occupying a similar position to cribbage in England. It first became popular in England after the marriage of Mary I of England to Philip II of Spain in 1554. During this period the game was known as cent, after the Spanish game cientos, referring to the fact that one of the chief goals of piquet is to reach 100 points. Following the marriage of King Charles I of England to Henrietta Maria of France in 1625, the British adopted the French name for the game. It went in and out of fashion among the upper classes in Britain between the 17th and early 20th centuries, its demise from the end of the First World War being put down to the rise of Gin Rummy "and other lowbrow games that are easier to learn and faster to play."

== Rules ==
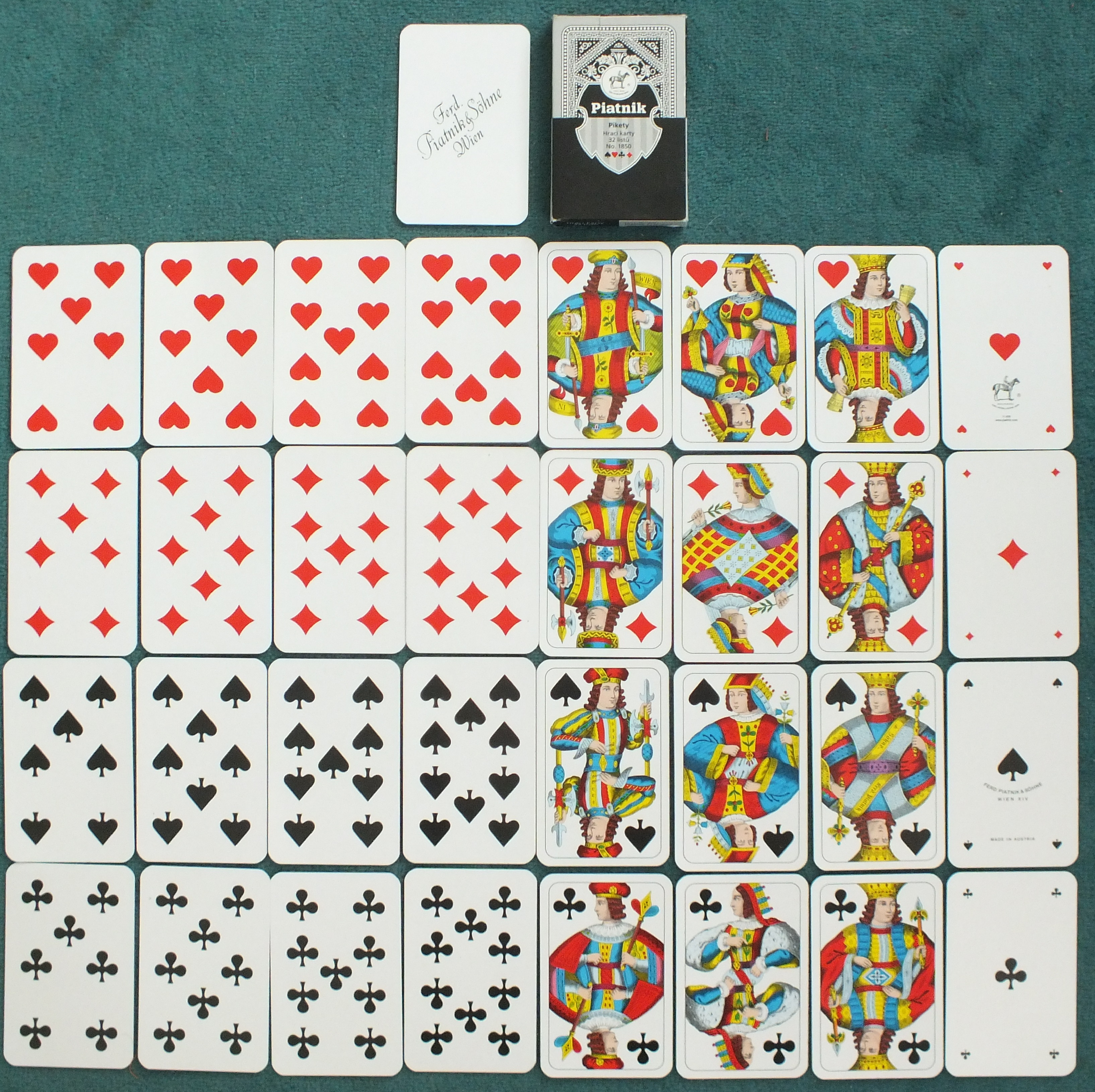
A pack of Piquet cards

Piquet is played with a 32-card pack, normally referred to as a piquet pack or piquet deck. The pack comprises the 7s through to 10s, the face cards, and the aces in each suit, and can be created by removing all 2–6 values from a 52-card poker pack. Each game consists of a partie of six deals (partie meaning match in French). The player scoring the most points wins (see the scoring section for further details).

=== Cards ===
In Piquet cards rank as follows (from highest to lowest) :

=== Cut ===
The player who cuts the higher card has to deal, and the dealer has the choice of cards at the commencement of each partie. A partie consists of six deals. The players deal alternately for each hand in the partie. It is preferable to deal first so as not to deal the last hand. Dealing puts a player at a disadvantage.

=== Deal ===
Twelve cards are dealt to each player, with the remaining eight forming the talon, which is placed face-down between the players. The talon may be split by the dealer into two piles of five and three cards, respectively. The dealer is referred to as the younger hand and the non-dealer as the elder hand.

=== Exchanging cards ===
The goal of exchanging cards is to improve one's hand before the declaration and the play. The elder hand exchanges first. This is done by taking one to five cards from the hand and placing them face down. An equal number is then drawn from the talon. At least one card must be exchanged. The player must state how many cards he intends to exchange if fewer than the maximum. If the elder chooses to take fewer than the maximum, he may then look at the remainder from the five (which are the first ones that the younger will take).

The younger hand exchanges next. Again, at least one card must be exchanged. The younger may also exchange up to five cards, depending on how many the elder exchanged. If the elder exchanged all five, then the younger may only exchange up to the three remaining in the talon.

=== Carte blanche ===
After the deal, players sort their cards in their hands. A player with no court cards (J, Q, K) may declare "carte blanche," which is worth 10 points. Carte blanche should be declared immediately. Either player declaring carte blanche must show their hand to the other. However, to preserve fairness, a formal protocol should be followed:

==== Elder has carte blanche ====
- Elder declares the number of cards that will be exchanged, and sets them to the side.
- Younger chooses cards to be exchanged, and sets them to the side.
- Elder displays entire hand, including cards set aside.

==== Younger has carte blanche ====
- Younger displays after elder has exchanged cards.

A hand of this type is fairly rare, appearing roughly once every 1,800 hands. Although it often scores poorly, it is usually advantageous to declare it to prevent the opponent from scoring pique or repique, despite the tactical disadvantage of giving information to the opponent.

Note: It is impossible for both players to hold carte blanche, so it will never happen that both players declare carte blanche. (There are 12 face cards in the pack (J, Q, K x 4). There are only 8 cards in the talon, so at least one player's hand must hold some face cards.)

=== Declaration phase ===
In the declaration phase, the players ascertain who has the better hand in each of three categories: point, sequence, and set. This is done in an oblique sort of way that leads to some of the intrigue of piquet. Elder hand declares first always, with younger responding. In each part of the declaration, the younger hand may choose to contest the elder's claim. By doing so, the younger may reveal information that would be useful during the trick-taking phase, called the play. Likewise, the elder may choose not to reveal information in one or more parts of the declaration.

==== Point ====
If the elder has at least four cards in a suit, he may make a declaration: for example, "Point of four". The younger would then respond indicating that he has more, fewer, or the same number of cards in a suit. This is done by saying "Good" (the elder has more and wins the point), "Not good" (the elder has fewer), or "Making?" or "How many?", indicating that the younger has the same number of cards in a suit, which requires clarification.

If both players have the same number of cards in a suit, then they must tally the value of the cards. The values of the cards are as follows: ace = 11, face cards = 10, and face value for the rest. After adding the values of the cards, the elder calls out the number. The younger may then say "Good", if the elder's value is greater, or "Not good" and the number that wins the point. For example: "Not good: 39" or "Not good, I have 39". If the values are the same, younger says "Equal".

The player with the better point scores the number of cards in the suit, not their value. If the values are the same, neither player scores. Note that younger does not actually score for any declarations until elder has led to the first trick in the play (see below).

==== Sequence ====
The next part of the declaration is the sequence, in which the longest consecutive run of cards is valued. A sequence must have at least three cards and they must all be in the same suit. Again, the elder hand starts. For example, "Run of three" or "Sequence of four". The younger than responds with "Good" or "Not good", in the same way as before, or by contesting. To contest, the younger says "How high?", to which the elder responds with the highest card in the sequence. For example, "To the queen". Younger replies with "Good", "Not good" or "Equal".

In keeping with the game's ancestry, one may utilize the historical names for sequences in this part of the declaration, instead of the prosaic "Run of three", for example. The following are the proper names and their associated values; those from 6 up are obsolete in English:

Number	Point worth number	Proper name	Pronunciation
3	3	tierce	/ˈtɪərs/
4	4	quart	/ˈkɑːrt/
5	15	quint	/ˈkɪnt/
6	16	sixième	French: [siˈzjɛm]
7	17	septième	French: [sɛˈtjɛm]
8	18	huitième	French: [ɥiˈtjɛm]

The person winning the sequence may declare any additional sequences that he has, if desired. If both players' best sequences are equal then neither player may score for any sequences.

==== Set ====
A set is three or four of a kind, ten or greater (7s, 8s, and 9s don't count, and aces are highest). Sets of three are called trios or brelans and are worth 3 points, and sets of four, quatorzes ("cat-orz"), are worth 14 points. The declarations take place in the same manner as "point" and "sequence", with elder stating his best set (for example, "Three kings"), to which younger replies "Good" or "Not good". The player with the best set may declare any additional sets that he has if desired.

==== Carte rouge ====
A variation is sometimes played in which 20 points are received if every card in a player's hand is used at some point while making up one or more "good" declarations, carte blanche excluded. The points are scored at the time this occurs and are not subject to the order of point counting, below.

The following example should illustrate one way carte rouge may apply during a hand.

Six cards were good in points, and the other six were good in sequences.

The 20 points would then be awarded at that stage of the counting towards a repique.

==== Pique and repique ====
If a player scores 30 points during the declaration phase prior to his opponent scoring anything, that player gains a repique, which is worth an additional 60 points. If elder scores 30 points in declarations and play combined, before younger scores any points, then elder gains a pique and scores an additional 30 points. A player can only score either repique or pique, not both.

All declaration scoring must be evaluated in the following order, after the play of the first card by elder:

1. Carte blanche
2. Points
3. Sequences
4. Sets

If a player were to score more than 30 points in points and sequences before the other might score in sets, then the player would receive a repique.

For example: elder has a quatorze of aces for 14 points; younger has a point of 7 and two quints for a total of 37 points. According to the order of scoring, above, younger would receive the repique bonus.

Note that younger can never gain a pique because elder always scores one point for leading to the first trick (see below). By the end of the declaration, each player will have a pretty good idea of the other's hand (to the degree that each chooses to claim their points).

Additionally, should elder achieve "cards"—more than 6 tricks—prior to younger winning any tricks, then the 10 points for "cards" may immediately be applied to a pique. If elder subsequently wins all the tricks, elder only receives the remaining 30 of the 40 points awarded for capot. The capot does not count towards a pique.

Equality has no effect on pique or repique.

Carte rouge is applied as soon as it occurs, and is not subject to the ordering, above; however, a common variation is that a "pique" or "repique" cannot be scored as the result of a "Carte Rouge" by the younger hand, once elder has played a first card.

=== Play ===
The play is the trick-taking part of the game. Players must follow suits with the elder hand placing a card face up and scoring one point. The younger player then scores for their declarations and plays a card that follows suit, if possible. If not, he may discard anything he chooses. The winner of the trick (the player with the highest card in the suit led), takes the trick, placing it face-down (usually; see variations) in front of themself. The winner of the trick leads the next. When forced to discard, it is important to choose the right card. See tactics.

The score is usually kept verbally as play progresses. Trick score counts as follows:

- 1 point for leading a trick
- If the second player (the player who doesn't lead) wins a trick, they get a point.
- The winner of the last trick wins a 1-point bonus (see variations).

==== Cards ====
The player with the greater number of tricks won at the end of play scores 10 for cards. If there is a tie, then neither player scores the additional points.

==== Capot ====
If all 12 tricks are won by one player, that player scores 40 points for capot ("capot" is the origin of the word kaput).

=== Scoring ===
- Rubicon piquet: Six hands are played regardless of final score. The winner's margin is computed as winner's score – loser's score + 100. If, however, the loser fails to score at least 100 points, then the final score is computed as: winner's score + loser's score + 100; since the loser failed to "cross the Rubicon".

E.g. 105 to 101 = 4 + 100 = 104 to the winner; 97 to 89 = 97 + 89 + 100 = 286 to the winner

- Classic piquet, also known as piquet au cent: Played to 100 or 101 points, regardless of how many hands it takes to reach 100, usually five or six, uses a pack that includes the sixes of all four suits, and allows up to seven cards to be exchanged by the elder hand. In this variation, it is possible for both hands to score carte blanche, since the six of each suit is available to be used in a sequence of 6, 7, 8, 9, 10, A in each player's hand, two suits each. Additionally, points are not accumulated for leading to a trick, but are rather earned by the winner of the trick, one point per 10-card or higher; thus, a person could win a trick, and earn 0, 1, or 2 points. There is no point for winning the last trick.

=== Variations ===
- Players may choose to keep tricks face up in front of them.
- Players may look through both players' winning tricks.
- The winner of the last trick may score 10 points instead of 1, making the choice of how to close the play more significant.
- Declarations state the total card values for points each time it is declared, not just when the dealer says "Equal".
- Carte rouge may award 10 or 40 points instead of 20, at the players' discretion.

=== Tactics ===
Players discard low cards (nine or lower) even if this means getting rid of four or more of one suit. This diminishes the chances of winning the point round, but this round is the lowest scoring one. Getting rid of these lower cards to get straights of five or more is very beneficial and will increase one's score greatly. Players may attempt to hold "stop" cards (usually queens or kings in their opponent's strong suit) for the last stage of play, in order to block their opponent's run of tricks with their long sequences.

== Background ==
In The Gaming Table: Its Votaries and Victims author Andrew Steinmetz (1816–1877) describes how the game is played:

The card game piquet is said to have derived its name from that of its inventor, who contrived it to amuse Charles VI of France. The game was played with thirty two cards, that is, discarding out of the pack all the deuces, treys, fours, fives, and sixes. Regular piquet-packs were sold. In reckoning up the points, every card counted for its value, as ten for ten, nine for nine, and so on down to seven, which was, of course, the lowest; but the ace reckoned for eleven. All court cards reckoned for ten. As in other games, the ace won the king, the king the queen, and so on, to the knave, which won the ten. The cards were dealt at option by fours, threes, or twos, to the number of twelve, which was the hand— 'discarding' being allowed; but both the dealer and he that led were obliged to discard at least one card. When the cards were played out, each counted his tricks; and he that had most reckoned 10 for winning the cards; if the tricks were equal, neither reckoned at all. He who, without playing (that is, according to the various terms of the game), could reckon up 30 in hand, when his antagonist reckoned nothing, scored 90 for them; this was called a repic; and all above 30 counted so many—32 counting 92, and so on. He who could make up 30, part in hand and part by play, before the other made anything, scored 60; this was called a pic.

The game was also played as pool precisely according to the rules briefly sketched as above, the penalty for losing being a guinea to the pool. Piquet required much practice to play it well. It became so great a favourite that, by the middle of the 18th century, the meanest people were well acquainted with it, and 'let into all the tricks and secrets of it, in order to render them complete sharpers.' Such are the words of an old author, who adds that the game was liable to great imposition, and he explains the methods in use. Short cards were used for cutting, as in whist, at the time. Of these cards there were two sorts, one longer than the rest; and the advantage gained by them was as the adversary managed it, by cutting the longer or broader, as best suited his purpose, or imposing on the dealer, when it was his turn, to cut those that made most against him. The aces, kings, queens, and knaves were marked with dots at the corners, and in the very old book from which I am quoting precise directions are given how this marking can be effected in such a manner 'as not to be discovered by your adversary, and at the same time appear plain to yourself. With a fine pointed pen and some clear spring water, players made dots upon the glazed card at the corners according to the above method; or they coloured the water with India ink, to make the marks more conspicuous. The work concludes as follows: There are but 32 cards made use of at piquet, so that just half of them will be known to you; and in dealing you may have an opportunity to give yourself those you like best; and if you cannot conveniently change the pack according to your desire, you will commonly know what you are to take in, which is a demonstrative advantage to win any one's money.

He also describes a "card telegraphy" signalling system used by cheaters. The 32 cards used in the game can be described using a combination of twelve signals—eight for the value of the card and four for its color. Steinmetz lists some signals and their meaning:

- Player looks at his confederate: A king.
- Player looks at the play of his adversary: A queen.
- Player looks at the stake: A knave.
- Player looks at the opposite: An ace.
- Player's mouth is slightly open: Hearts.
- Player's mouth is closed: Diamonds.
- Player's upper lip is "slightly pouting over the lower": Clubs
- Player's lower lip is drawn over the upper: Spades

Should a cheater wish to announce the knave and ace of hearts, he would glance at the stake and then to the opposite side, whilst keeping his mouth slightly open.

Steinmetz adds:

It is evident that this telegraphy may be employed at all games where there is a gallery. In effect, nothing is easier at piquet than to indicate, by the aid of these signals, the colour in which the player should discard and that in which he should keep what cards he has.

These are the simplest signs; but some of the [cheaters] have a great number of them, to designate everything; and even sometimes to communicate and receive intelligence, when necessary. This telegraphy is so imperceptible that it is difficult to describe it, and altogether impossible to detect it.

== See also ==
- Écarté

== Bibliography ==
- Edmond Hoyle (1744) A Short Treatise on the Game of Piquet, George and Alexander Ewing, Dublin
- Edmond Hoyle (1775) Mr. Hoyle's Games of Whist, Quadrill, Piquet, Chess and Back-Gammon, Thomas Osborne, London
- Reuben Roy (1850) The Noble and Interesting Game of Piquet; Familiarly and Scientifically Treated, Henry Kent Causton, London
- Berkley (1891) Piquet and Rubicon Piquet, F.A. Stokes Co., New York
- Boussac, Jean. (1896) Encyclopedia of card games: Piquet, pp. 300–302. Leon Chailley, Paris. Transl. from French, 2017.
- Foster, Robert Frederick (1897) Foster's Complete Hoyle: An Encyclopedia of All the Indoor Games Played, pp. 463–475, F.A. Stokes Co., New York
- Cavendish (1908) The Laws of Piquet Adopted by the Portland and Turf Clubs, 9th Ed., Thomas De La Rue & Co., London
- Mitzka, Walther, ed. (2010) [1954]. Trübner's Deutsches Wörterbuch. Vol. 5 (O–R). Berlin: de Gruyter.
- Chomel, Noel (1756). Die Wahren Mittel, Länder und Staaten Glücklich, Ihre Beherrscher Mächtig, und die Unterthanen Reich zu Machen. Part 7 (N–Q). Leipzig: Clanner.
