= Bestia (game) =

Italian card game

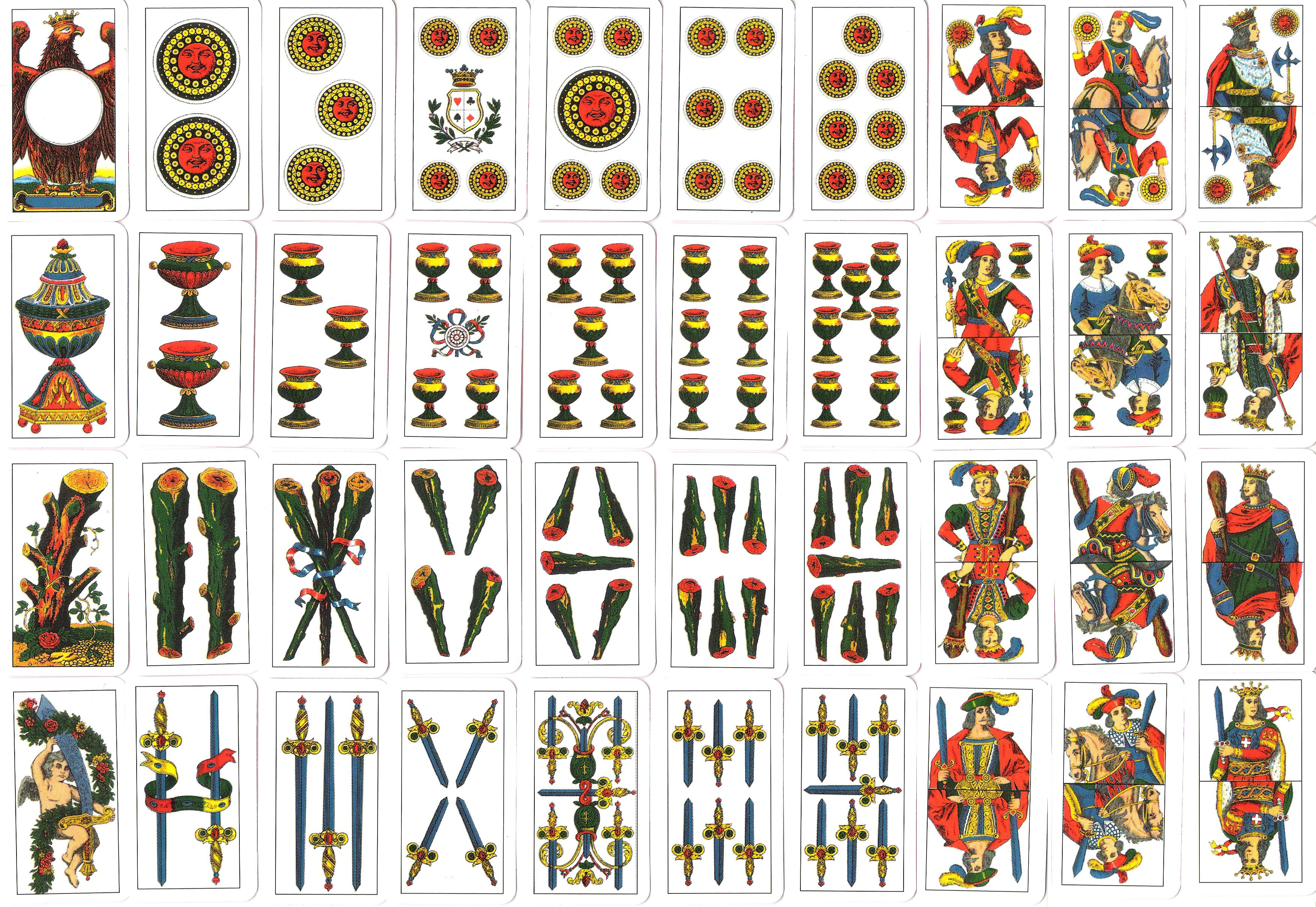
- Italian-suited Piacentine pattern cards
- Origin: Italy
- Alternative names: l'Asino
- Type: Trick taking
- Family: Rams group
- Players: 3–10
- Cards: 40 cards
- Deck: Italian
- Rank (high→low): 1 3 R C F 7 6 5 4
- Play: Anti-clockwise
- Chance: High

Related games
- Bête

Bestia is an Italian card game. It is a gambling game and is similar to Briscola and Tressette. The word bestia means beast.

== History ==
The game of Bête was born in France around 1600. It is recorded as early as 1608, and the game is described in La maison academique : contenant les jeux du picquet, du hoc, du tric-trac, (…), divers jeux de cartes, qui se joüent en differentes fac̜ons, Paris, 1659: as ‘Le Jeu de l'Homme, autrement dit la Beste’. La maison academique was later reprinted (1665, 1668, 1674, 1697, 1702), then was continued by the Académie Universelle des Jeux (Paris 1718, and later editions). The first description of the Italian game of Bestia comes from Raffaele Bisteghi in his Il giuoco pratico (Bologna, 1753). The French and Italian game are analyzed and discussed by Girolamo Zorli. Eighteenth-century Bestia was different from today's version described below. It was a catch game with an obligation to play or fold, from the family of today's Tressette, or rather of Trionfo/Snipe/Maraffone. The winner of a short auction played for the pot against the other players. Some foundations of the original game remain in today's Bestia: the shortened pack, the limited number of tricks in play (five), the obligation to play or fold, bidding for the number of tricks and not the value of the cards, the stakes or bêtes paid by a losing declarer that weren't received by the winning defenders but carried forward to the next hand's pot.

== Rules ==
Bestia is played by 3 to 10 players. Deal and play are anticlockwise. The game consists of several hands and the aim is to take the most winnings from the pot and to prevent the others taking any tricks.

=== Cards ===
Bestia is played with a pack of 40 Spanish-suited Italian playing cards, for example of the Piacentine, Neapolitan or Sicilian pattern. The cards rank in descending order in each suit as follows: Ace, 3, Re (king), Cavallo (knight), Fante or Donna (jack), 7, 6, 5, 4, 2.

=== Stakes ===
At the start of the hand, a pot of an agreed stake is created which will be divided among the trick winners. The pot must always be paid by the dealer on his turn and must be divisible into 3 shares. Once the dealer has anted the stake to the pot, each player is dealt 3 cards.

=== Deal ===
First dealer is usually chosen by lot; the player drawing the highest card going first. Thereafter the deal rotates to the right. The dealer shuffles the pack and has it cut by the player to the left, before turning the top card for trump. The dealer then gives 3 cards to each player in a single packet, beginning with first hand on the right.

=== Auction ===
The purpose of the auction is to determine how many players will participate in the current hand. Bidding It follows the deal, is opened by first hand and proceeds anticlockwise. Each player may "pass", laying their cards down, or knock, thus committing to play the hand and take at least one trick. Once the bidding is over, the dealer invites those who passed to discard their hands and receive 3 more cards. If they accept, they must play and commit to making at least one trick. This exchange has various regional names such as: "andare a cicca" ("picking up the dregs"), "andare a dottore" ("going to the doctor's"), "fare un dottore" ("doing a doctor"), "prendere il buco" ("taking a lucky dip"), "prendere il bambino" ("taking the baby"), "andare a spizzico" ("getting a takeaway"). If there are insufficient cards left to replenish all those who passed, the dealer collects the trump upcard together with all the face down cards on the table, except the discards of those receiving new cards. The dealer then shuffles them, has the cut and deals them out. Presumably players who pass and refuse new cards, drop out of the current hand.

=== Play ===
First hand leads to the first trick and each player, in turn, plays one card to the trick. A trick consists of one card played by each player in turn, and in each deal there are 3 tricks. Players must follow suit as in the game of Tresette. Lacking a card of the led suit, a player must play a trump if able. The trick is taken by the player who played the highest trump, or the highest card of the led suit if no trumps were played. The trick winner leads to the next trick.

=== Settlement ===
At the end of the hand, the pot is divided among the players on the basis of their tricks, therefore one third per trick taken. If a player fails to make at least one trick, he loses ("goes bête") and doubles the pot. It may be pre-agreed, that if no players are bête, the next hand will be a force in which everyone must play.

=== Tactics ===
- If player on lead has the highest trump (the Ace) he should play it. The same rule does not apply to the three, even if the ace of the same suit is out.
- If player on lead has a trump after the first trick, he must play it.
- If a player has to play trumps (e.g. having only trumps in his hand or not having the led suit for the second trick) he will play the highest trump. An exception is when one's highest trump does not exceed the one already played, which has nothing to do with the obligation to trump.

The above 3 maxims are excellent tactics and many circles make them rules, punished with the payment of the pot if broken.
