= Bête =

French card game

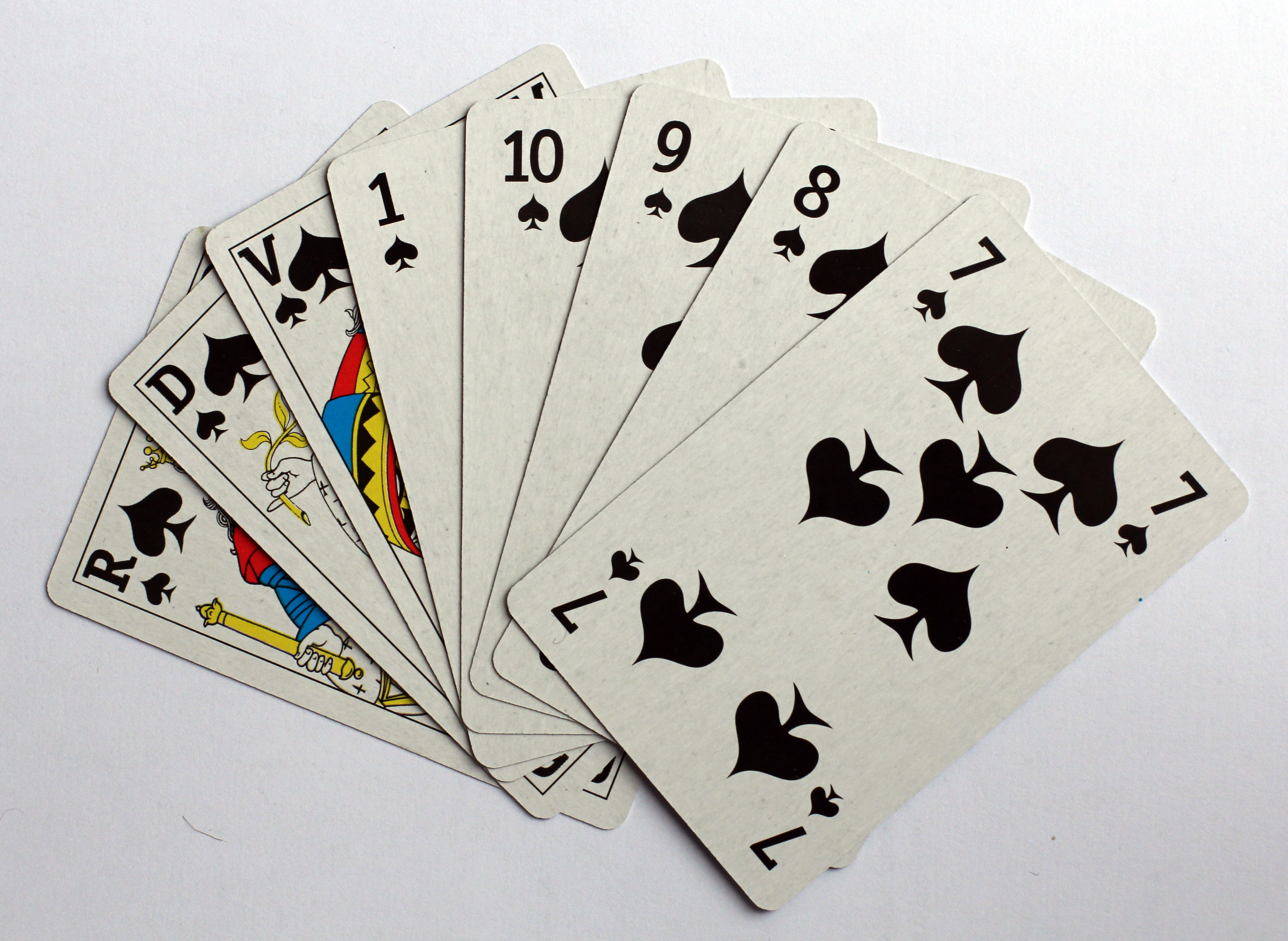
- The suit of Spades, ranking as in Bête
- Origin: France
- Alternative names: (la) Beste, l'Homme
- Type: Plain-trick game
- Family: Rams group
- Players: 3–5 (2–7)
- Age range: 12+
- Cards: 28-36
- Deck: Piquet or French
- Rank (high→low): K Q J A 10 9 8 7
- Play: Anticlockwise

Related games
- Ombre, Mouche, Lanterloo, Rams
- Features: pot, 5 cards, no top trump, no dropping out, no flush as winning hand

Bête, la Bête (French: Jeu de la Bête), Beste or la Beste (Jeu de la Beste), originally known as Homme or l'Homme (Jeu de l'Homme), was an old, French, trick-taking card game, usually for three to five players. It was a derivative of Triomphe created by introducing the concept of bidding. Its earlier name gives away its descent from the 16th-century Spanish game of Ombre. It is the "earliest recorded multi-player version of Triomphe".

During the 17th century, the Ombre concept of bidding was incorporated into Triomphe resulting in the game initially called l'Homme ("Man") and, later, la Beste or la Bête (German Labet, Dutch LaBate, English Beast). La Bête, or just Bête or Beast in English, later gave rise to the variants of Mouche and Mistigri, the latter still being played today. It may also have been antecedent to the games of the Rams family although it does not share their characteristic of allowing players to drop out of the current deal if they consider their hand to be too poor.

Bête was a gambling game, often played for small stakes, but was also played as a social and family game. It is named after the bête, a term that referred to the penalty for failing to take the required number of tricks or for various infringements. The term, bête, came to be used in both French and German in various other card games as the name for the stake on a game, the penalty for losing and the loser himself.

== History ==
At first called Homme, the game appears as early as 1619 in French literature and originated from the Spanish game of Ombre, the name of which also means "man" although, unlike Homme, it did not allow players to contre the initial bid to play, and its more immediate antecedent was the game of Triomphe as attested by other sources. The expression faire la bête ("make the bête" - see below) gave rise to the game's second name, 'Bête' or 'Beste'. The 1690 edition of Dictionaire Universel calls it "jeu de la Beste" and states that virevole or dévole was a term used in the game to refer to a player who undertook to win every trick, but failed to win any and had to pay a penalty to the other players.

By the mid-17th century, the game had spread to Germany, where it was known as la Bäte, la Bête, Labeth or Labetspiel (Note: In the Hamburg dialect it was also known as Fyvander - see Richey (1755, p. 57).) and to Italy where it was referred to as bestia or l'asino. By the 18th century, it had reached England, where it was called Beast (see below), and Austria-Hungary, where it was known as Labet or Zwickerspiel and banned as a gambling game.

Bête subsequently evolved into the games known Mouche or Lenturlu (see also the English game of Lanterloo) - which featured bluffing, 'robbing' (i.e. exchanging with) the talon and winning outright if a player was dealt an eponymous, five-card flush - and Mistigri or Pamphile, which additionally promoted the Jack of Clubs to the top trump. As Bête, the rules are last recorded in 1888. The English game Lanterloo resembles the latter, but may have crossed the channel at an earlier stage of development and evolved in parallel to its eventual form.

== Rules ==
The rules for Bête remained substantially the same for about two centuries, but by 1828, the name seems to have merely become a synonym for the game of Mouche, a game which differed in allowing players to drop out of a deal with a poor hand and to win the game if they were dealt a flush.

The following rules are based on Le Gras (1739), except where stated.

=== Aim ===
The overall aim of the game is to win counters, known as jetons, which can then be converted into money at a pre-agreed rate. Within each deal, the player who becomes the declarer aims to win three of the five tricks or at least the first two, if no one else makes three. Meanwhile the defenders try to prevent the declarer winning, forcing him to pay the penalty known as the bête.

=== Players and cards ===
The game is played by three to seven players. If five play, a 32-card Piquet pack is used; if more play, 36 cards of a French pack are needed; if three or four play, the Sevens are removed leaving 28 cards. According to Van de Aa (1721), the game was usually played by three or four players, "three being better". Card ranking is as per Écarté: K > Q > J > A > 10 > 9 > 8 > (7) > (6).

=== Dealing ===
Deal and play are anticlockwise. The first dealer is chosen by lot. The pack is placed face down and players take the top card in turn, the player drawing the first King or other nominated card dealing first. Five cards are dealt to each player either as 2+2+1, 2+3, 3+2 or 2+1+2. The mode of dealing is up to the first dealer and then stays the same for rest of the game. After dealing the talon is placed face down on the table and the dealer turns the top card for trump, leaving it on top of the talon.

=== Stakes ===
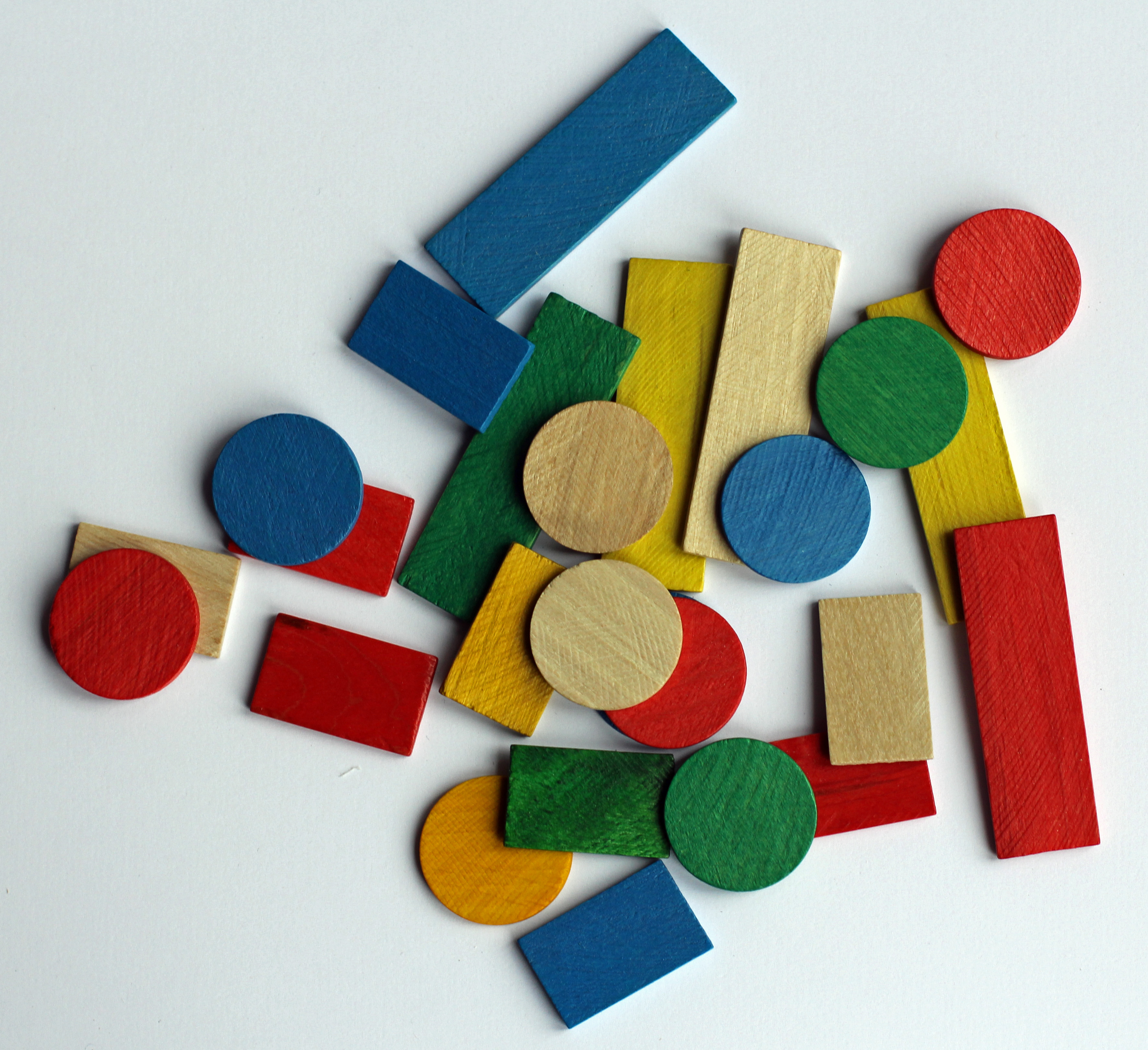
Coloured wooden tokens of the type used in Bête. The round ones are jetons and the long rectangular ones are fiches

An "upturned silver, tin or ceramic dish" is used for the game and each player begins by placing a fiche (a token worth 5 or 10 jetons) half under the dish, facing him, and then places 2 jetons (chips), one beside the dish as the stake for the deal and the second on top of the dish to be won by the player with the King of trumps. The dealer adds a third jeton; this also serves to remind everyone who dealt.

If, during the game, there is a bête at stake for a particular deal, no jetons are staked on that deal apart from the extra one placed by the dealer. Since fiches are won singly, no fiches are anted until all have been taken.

=== Bidding ===
Players now pick up their cards and decide whether they have a game. Beginning with the eldest hand, the player to the right of the dealer, players elect whether to "play" (je joue or je prends) or "pass" (je passe). If a second player decides he has a good enough hand, he may double the game by saying contre. Otherwise the first to say "play" prevails and becomes, in effect, the declarer. Once a bid is made, it cannot be changed. Bids may not be made once the first card is played to a trick.

If all pass, players may opt to stake another jeton and turn the next card of the talon as trumps. This card is known as the Curieuse. The first trump upcard becomes void and is placed to one side.

=== Playing ===
Eldest hand leads to the first trick. Suit must be followed. If players are unable to follow, they must trump or overtrump if able. Only if they have no cards of the led suit and no trumps high enough to head the trick, may they discard. So, for example, if a plain suit card is led and then trumped, a subsequent player may discard even if he has a trump, provided that it is not high enough to overtrump. The penalty for revoking, or failing to play the appropriate suit when able, is a single bête.

=== Scoring ===
If the declarer wins, he sweeps all the jetons staked on the deal, a fiche, and the current bête, if present (e.g., if five play, he wins the value of 11 jetons; one from each player including himself plus the extra one placed by the dealer and a fiche worth 5 jetons. If a bête is currently staked, they would win it too). If the declarer takes all five tricks - a vole - he not only wins all the stakes for the game, but all the bêtes, including those not part of the current deal and also wins an extra jeton from each other player.

If the declarer loses, he 'makes the bête', that is he pays the penalty known as the bête. The amount paid out in a bête is always the same as the player would have earned if he had won the deal (e.g., with five players, 6 jetons, the value of a fiche, and the amount of the current bête, if present) which he pays into a separate pot to be played for in the next deal. If the declarer loses every trick, it is a dévole and he pays an additional jeton to each player.

When a bête is paid, it is staked on the next deal unless there is already a bête on that deal, in which case it is put to one side until the following deal and so on.

If a contre has been announced; the contre player wins or loses double, but the original player only wins or loses a single bête as normal.

If the declarer ties with another player for the number of tricks won, the round is null. Dealer role passes counterclockwise and only the new dealer adds a jeton for the next round.

==== Example ====
The following example assumes there are five players:

Deal 1. The first deal is for a simple (single) stake. Player A elects to play but loses. Had he won, he would have collected one fiche, the five jetons staked on the game plus the extra one by the dealer, making 11 jetons. Instead he must pay this amount into the pool for deal 2. All the stakes for the deal remain in place. Player C holds the King of trumps and wins the 5 jetons for the 'King', which are replaced by all the players.
Deal 2. Player A loses again. No-one has the King of trumps. As before, the bête is the same amount as that he would have won. All the stakes from both deals and the stakes for the King remain in place. The second bête is a sum that equates to 28 jetons i.e.:

- The six jetons staked in deal 1
- The jeton placed by the dealer in deal 2
- The two fiches from the first and second deals
- The fiche and 6 jetons of the first bête

Deal 3. Only the dealer adds a jeton and players are playing for the first bête. The second bête is held in abeyance until the next deal. Player B wins the King and collects the five jetons. Player D wins the game and collects 34 jetons:

- The first bête (1 fiche + 6 jetons)
- The jetons that have been staked (6 jetons from deal 1 + 2 more from deals 2 and 3)
- Three fiches - one for each of the 3 deals so far.

Deal 4. Players place the jetons for the deal and the King. The dealer adds his extra jeton. There are two fiches left in play along with the second bête. And so it continues.

==== The King ====
The King is the name of those additional stakes (one jeton per player) placed on top of their dish or plate. These are won by the player who has the King of trumps, except in the case where he was also the declarer and lost the deal, in which case the stakes remain in place for the next deal. As soon as the King is won, players place another jeton on their plates.

== Terminology ==
Lacombe helpfully describes the terminology used in the game of la Bête:

- A-tout. Trump, trump suit. The suit which is trumps.
- Avoir la parole. ("have the floor"). To bid, declare, announce. This refers to the point when it is a player's turn to announce whether he will "pass" or "play".
- Bête ("beast"). A type of penalty which a player incurs in various situations, e.g. if he renounces, or if he does not take the tricks required to win.
- Contre ("to counter"). To announce that you will play against the player who has elected to 'play'.
- Couper ("cut").
1. To cut i.e to split a pack of cards in two before dealing.
2. To trump. Playing a trump to the led (non-trump) card.
- Curieuse ("curious"). The card turned as a second trump after all the players have passed.
- Dévole. When the declarer fails to take any tricks.
- Donner ("to give") To deal i.e. to distribute the cards to the players after shuffling and having them cut.
- Fiche. A counter worth ten chips or jetons.
- Jeton. A counter or chip that acts as money during the game and is worth one tenth of a fiche.
- Jouer. To play. By saying "play" or "je joue" a player announces the intention to take the tricks needed to win the stakes on the game accepting that, if he fails, he must 'make the bête.'
- Levée. Trick. A trick we took while playing.
- Méler. To shuffle. To mix the cards before dealing them.
- Passer. To pass. Not to open the game, or give up electing to play the current deal.
- Refaire. To redeal. To distribute the cards again [after a false start].
- Renoncer. To revoke. Not to follow the led suit when able.
- Retourner. To turn, flip. When the cards are dealt, to turn the first card of the talon to determine trumps.
- Surcouper. To overtrump. To play a higher trump to the one with which a previous player has trumped the led card.
- Talon. The cards that remain when we each player has been dealt his cards.
- Triomphe. Trump; trump suit. The suit that beats all the other cards.
- Vole. Slam. When the declarer takes all the tricks.
- tirer la bête = "take the bête" i.e. win the deal
- faire la bête = "make the bête" i.e. lose the deal (and pay a penalty equal to the stake)
- faire contre = "play a contre" i.e. play against the one who elects to play. This doubles the win and the penalty for the contre player.

== Variations ==
=== Ranks ===
As with Écarté, for a more modern variation of the game, the cards may be re-ranked with the Ace as the highest card (with the associated pot) and the King as the second highest card (as in most modern card games).

== Beast ==
In 1672, Francis Willughby recorded the earliest rules in English for the game of Beast or "Le Beste", but his work was not published until much later. He was followed shortly thereafter by Charles Cotton in The Compleat Gamester. The latter notes that the game of Beast was "called by the French, La Bett". From three to five played using cards ranking as per Écarté. Stakes are placed in three heaps called the King, the Play and the Triolet before five cards are dealt to each player as 2+3 or 3+2, as in French Ruff and the next turned as trumps. Players must follow suit or trump or overtrump if unable. The winner of the most tricks sweeps the Play, the one with the King (presumably of trumps) sweeps the King and a player with a triplet, e.g. three Fours, wins the Triolet.

== Literature ==
- _ (1664). Oesterreichisches Labeth-Spiel: Neues Ungarisches, Türkisches und Frantzösisches Labeth-Spiel u.s.w.
- _ (1793).Sr. k.k. Majestät Franz des Zweyten politische Gesetze und Verordnungen für die Oesterreichischen, Böhmischen und Galizischen Erbländer. Vol. 1, Vienna.
- Cady, A. Howard (1896). Écarté: A Treatise on the Game with Some Historical Notes on Its Origin. New York: American Sports Publishing Co.
- Castelli, Nicolo di (1730). Dizzionario italiano tedesco e tedesco italiano. Leipzig: Moritz Georg Weidmann.
- Depaulis, Thierry (1987). "L'homme ou la bête, un irritant problème" in The Playing Card Journal, Vol 16, Aug 1987-May 1988.
- Des Pepliers (1742). Nouvelle Et Parfaite Grammaire Royale Françoise et Allemande. Berlin: Ambrosius Haude.
- Furetière, Antoine (1690). Dictionaire Universel: Contenant generalement tous les Mots François, Volume 3, P-Z. Leers, Rotterdam.
- Lacombe, Jacques (1800). Dictionaire des jeux avec les planches relatives. Padua.
- Le Gras, Theodore (1739). Academie Universelle des Jeux. Paris.
- Maskosky, Martin (1688). Das Göppingsche Bethesda. Nördlingen: Joh. Christoph Hilbrandt.
- Martin, Daniel (1637). Parlement nouveau ou Centurie interlinaire. Strasbourg.
- Méré (1674). Le jeu de l'Hombre, Paris, Barbin, 1674 (anonymous); 2nd edn., revised, 1677.
- de Moulidars, Th. (1888). Grande Encyclopédie Méthodique. Paris.
- Oudin, Antoine (1642). Recherches italiennes & françoises, Vol 2. Paris.
- Parlett, David (1991). A History of Card Games, OUP, Oxford. ISBN 0-19-282905-X
- Richey, Michael (1755). Idioticon Hamburgense. Hamburg: Conrad König.
- Seymour, Richard (1725). The Compleat Gamester. Wilford, London.
- Van de Aa, Pierre (1721). La Plus Nouvelle Academie Universelle des Jeux.
