= Triomphe =

Card game

- A very early trump game
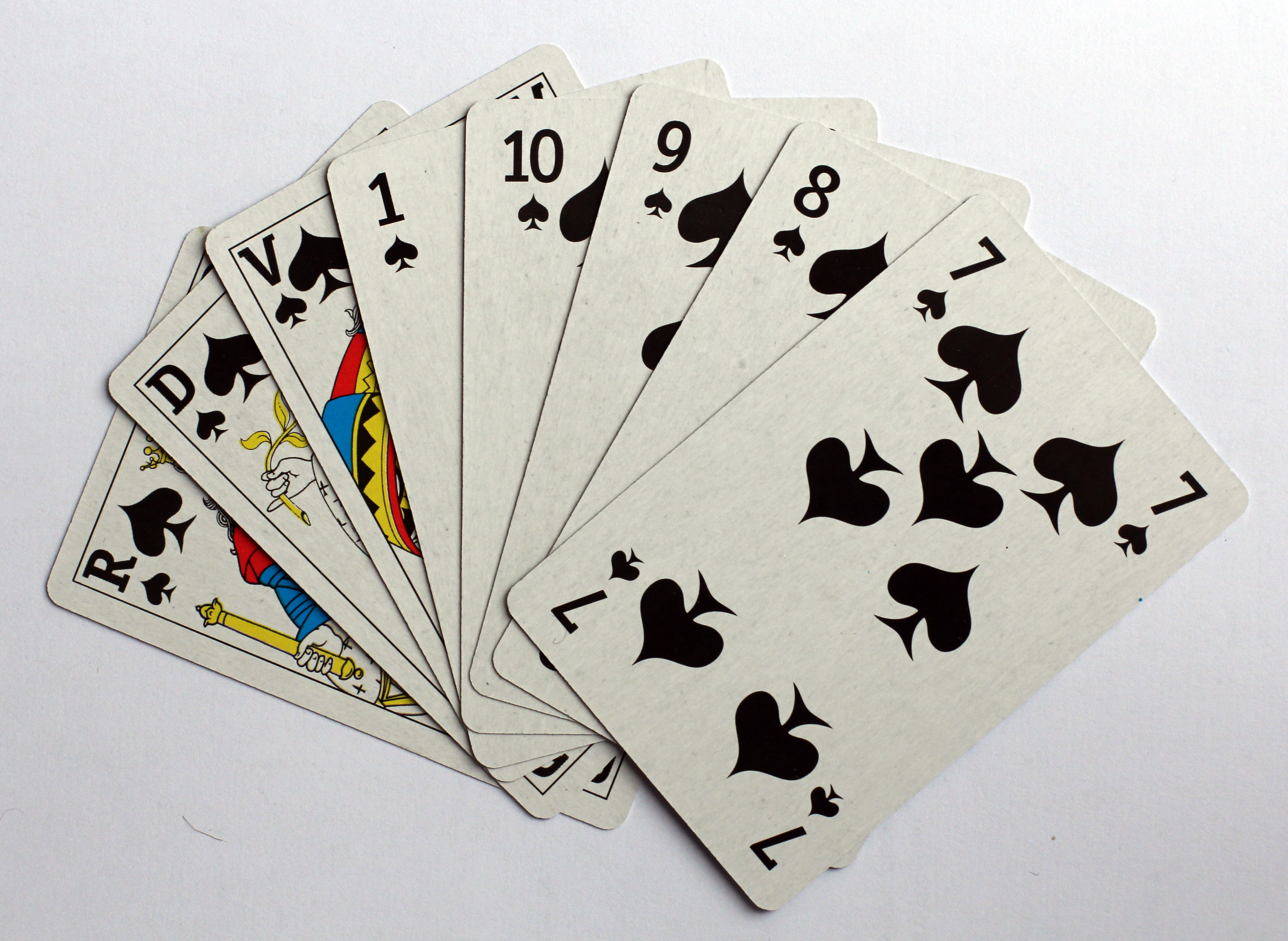
- The suit of Spades from a French pack, ranking as in Triomphe
- Origin: England
- Alternative names: Trump, Triumph, French ruff
- Family: Trick-taking
- Players: 2 or 4
- Cards: 36 or 52
- Deck: English pattern
- Rank (high→low): K Q J A 10 9 8 7 6
- Play: Clockwise

Triomphe (French for triumph), once known as French ruff, is a card game dating from the late 15th century. It most likely originated in France or Spain (as triunfo) and later spread to the rest of Europe. When the game arrived in Italy, it shared a similar name with the pre-existing game and deck known as trionfi; probably resulting in the latter becoming renamed as Tarocchi (tarot). While trionfi has a fifth suit that acts as permanent trumps, triomphe randomly selects one of the existing four suits as trumps. Another common feature of this game is the robbing of the stock. Triomphe became so popular that during the 16th century the earlier game of trionfi was gradually renamed tarocchi, tarot, or tarock. This game is the origin of the English word "trump" and is the ancestor of many trick-taking games like Euchre (via Écarté) and Whist (via Ruff and Honours). The earliest known description of Triomphe was of a point-trick game, perhaps one of the earliest of its type; later, the name was applied to a plain-trick game.

== Spanish rules ==
The earliest surviving description was written by Juan Luis Vives in his Exercitatio linguae latinae around 1538 in Basel. As he left Spain in 1509 never to return, the rules may date to his youth. However the game was already widespread by then. In 1541, Juan Maldonado (d. 1554) expanded on Vives's rules and later revised them in 1549. Both Vives and Maldonado described the rules in the form of dialogues between the players. It is an ancestor of Ombre.

The game is played by four players either individually or as partners. Maldonado uses a pack of 48 Spanish playing cards but Vives uses a French deck by discarding the 10s. In the suit of clubs and swords, the ranking from highest to lowest is King, Knight, Jack, 9 ... Ace while in the suit of cups and coins it is King, Knight, Jack, Ace ... 9. (Note: This ranking can also be found in Tarot, Maw, Madiao, Khanhoo, Tổ tôm, Unsun Karuta, and Ganjifa. It dates to the earliest card games.) In the trump suit, the Ace is promoted above the King. Partners are chosen by drawing cards from the deck with the two highest and the two lowest going together. They sit opposite of one another. Each player is dealt nine cards with the top card of the remaining stock of 12 flipped to reveal the trump suit. If the exposed card is an Ace or a face card, the dealer has the right to exchange it for a card in his hand and get awarded three points. Players must follow suit, if devoid of that suit then they can play trumps or a card from another suit. Players with a weak hand can concede at any time and force a redeal but this is considered losing that particular hand. This game was used for gambling with players raising stakes before each trick. Each card is worth 1 point and points are counted after each trick, if a side neglects to add points then they are not counted. The side that wins a hand gets their points for that particular hand doubled. The first side to obtain 32 points wins.

== English rules ==
=== Triumph ===
Hugh Latimer referred to the game of "Triumph" in 1529. The game is played in Gammer Gurton's Needle, a comedy written around 1553 and William Shakespeare also mentioned the game in Antony and Cleopatra (c. 1607). An incomplete description of "Trumpe" was provided by Jacques Bellot, a Huguenot from Caen residing in London, in his Familiar Dialogues (1586). Like Vives and Maldonado, the game is described in a dialogue. He describes a four-player partnership game where the one who cuts the highest card becomes the dealer. Twelve cards are commonly dealt counterclockwise to each player but his characters opt for a shorter game of nine cards. The dealer cuts the stock to reveal the trump suit. The player who holds the ace of trumps gets to rob the stock. Only trumps have value. Kings are high and worth 6, queens 4, jacks 2, and all other trumps 1. Players declare their trumps before trick-taking takes place. The game is abruptly interrupted, leaving the rest of the rules a mystery.

=== French Ruff ===
According to David Parlett, the French game of Triomphe was known in England as Trump or French Ruff, the latter name to distinguish it from English Ruff (or Ruff and Honours).

The rules are only known from The Compleat Gamester, first published in 1674, and reprinted more or less verbatim until 1754. A French-suited pack is used. They describe a game for two players or two teams of two or three players-a-side. Players cut for the deal and the player cutting the highest or lowest card, as pre-agreed, deals 5 cards each in packets of 2 and 3, before turning the next as trumps. Cards rank in Écarté order: K Q Kn A 10 9 7 6 5 4 3 2. If the dealer turns up the Ace as trumps, the dealer may 'ruff' (exchange) it with another card and, if agreed, may also exchange with the next card of the stock if it is a trump, continuing to exchange as long as trumps appear and laying out the cards discarded. This 'robbery' was known as 'ruffing' hence the name of the game. (Note: According to Parlett 'ruff' appears to have meant robbing the stock which makes sense in the games bearing this name.)

Players must follow suit or trump and overtrump if unable to follow; only discarding if unable to follow suit or trump. Winning three or four tricks scores 1 point, winning five tricks scores 5. If players agree, there are penalty points for incorrect dealing (1) or revoking (1 or 2). A player playing out of turn incurs 1 penalty point unless it is the last trick.

Gambiter assumes that winning 5 tricks is only worth 2 points and that game is 5. Play is anti-clockwise and eldest hand (right of the dealer) leads to the first trick. However, it is not clear from what source these clarifications or changes are drawn from.

== German rules ==
Incomplete rules from Strasbourg when it was still part of the Holy Roman Empire were recorded in both French and German (as Trümpfspiel) in 1637. Its rules are similar to the Dutch game of Troeven ("Trumps").

Aces are high and deuces are low. Each player takes a card from the deck; the lowest becomes the dealer. The dealer passes out nine cards to each player with the remaining cards forming the stock. The dealer exposes one card from the stock which will be the trump suit. If the dealer exposes an ace, he can exchange a worthless card for it. He can do the same with the remainder of the stock taking any trumps until he exposes a non-trump. The highest trump cards are fixed: the Ace of Hearts, the King of Diamonds, the Queen of Spades, and the Jack of Clubs.

The object of each hand is to capture cards with the most points. Aces are worth four, kings three, queens two, and jacks one; in total there should be 40 points. If a player achieves a slam (winning all the tricks), he will get 80 points. It was thus a point-trick game, probably one of the earliest known.

== French rules ==
Though Triomphe can be traced back to the 1480s in France, the earliest surviving rules date to 1659. French Triomphe was played by four players divided into two partnerships with a 52-card deck. The order of the cards from highest to lowest is King, Queen, Jack, Ace, 10, 9 ... 2. Each player takes a card from the deck, the one with the highest card becomes the dealer and passes five cards face down to everyone. The remaining 32 cards form the stock. The dealer then turns up a card from the stock, the suit of that card will be the trump suit. An optional rule is that the player with the Ace of trumps gets to exchange the exposed card with one from his hand. He can do the same with the remainder of the stock taking any trumps until he exposes a non-trump. This is called robbing the stock. If the dealer exposes an ace as the trump, then he gets the right to rob the stock. The current dealer picks the next dealer out of the opposing team.

The object of each hand is to win at least three tricks. Winning three or four tricks awards one point while winning all five tricks is worth two points. The first team to get five points wins the game. The eldest to the right of the dealer sets the first trick's suit with the winner of each trick leading to the next one. All players must follow suit if possible. Trumps must be used if void of the trick's suit. If the next player is also void, then she must over-trump if possible. If void in suit and trumps, then any card can be played but won't win. Since there are only 20 cards in play, any attempt to cheat by revoking is easily caught and the culprit loses the game.

Since the 18th century, the game has been played with a 32-card stripped deck.

== Variants ==
Triomphe generated a number of variants including:

- Triomphe de Toulouse: "one may not rob in this game"; the partners, sitting side by side may communicate with one another and choose, without speaking, which cards to play.
- Homme or Bête: a classic French game, where players bid to be the declarer, the "Man" or Homme, and undertake to make 3 tricks. Any other player may "contre" this and double the game. The declarer, on winning, sweeps the pool; on losing, "makes the bête (fait la bête), i.e. doubles the pool. The rules are first described by Daniel Martin, Colloques ou devis françois, Strasbourg, 1626; Id., Les Colloques françois & allemands, Strasbourg, 1627, but also in La maison academique contenant les jeux de 1659; la Bête (under this name) was very successful in Europe, especially Germany (where it became Labetenspiel, Kaufflabet or Contraspiel, the game where one "contre'd".
- Homme d'Auvergne, similar to Bête (rules also in La maison academique contenant les jeux de 1659).
- Lenturlu or Pamphile, a variant that appeared in the mid-17th century; same rules as Triomphe (5 cards each), but the ♣J (Pamphile) is the highest card; a 5-card flush is a Lenturlu, which earns extra points; like basic Triomphe, the maker must take 3 tricks to win; in the Dutch Republic, the game was called Lanterluy, in Great Britain, Lanterloo or Loo; in northern Germany, Lenterlu, Lenterspiel or Bester Bube.
- Mouche, Triomphe with stakes anted by each player to the pot (the mouche), which the winner claims; rules l’Encyclopédie (voir)
- Bourre (à cinq): resembles Mouche closely, especially popular in the countryside in the 19th century.

== Bibliography ==
- Cotton, Charles (1674) The Compleat Gamester. London: A.M.
- Johnson, Charles (1754). The Compleat Gamester. 8th edn. London: J. Hodges.
- McLeod, John (2005). "Playing the Game: The Benelux Games of Trumps" in The Playing-Card 33 (2). October/December 2004. ISSN 0305-2133 pp. 91 ff.
- Parlett, David (2008). The Penguin Book of Card Games, Penguin, London. ISBN 978-0-141-03787-5
