= Pieter van der Aa =

Cartographer from the Northern Netherlands

Pieter van der Aa (Leiden, 1659 – Leiden, August 1733) was a Dutch publisher best known for preparing maps and atlases, though he also printed pirated editions of foreign bestsellers and illustrated volumes. He also printed many maps that were often out of print, which he reissued. Some of his most popular maps were of the African continent, detailing locations such as Morocco and Madagascar. Many of his later works were printed for the general public in French and Dutch.

== Early life and family ==
Pieter van der Aa (1659–1733) was born in Leiden, one of the leading centres of printing and publishing in the Dutch Republic. He came from a family connected with the book and print trades. His father was a stonecutter from Holstein; his brother Boudewyn was a printer and his other brother Hildebrand a copper plate engraver.

He entered the book trade at a young age and trained in printing and publishing. By his early twenties, he had established his own business in Leiden as a printer, publisher, and bookseller, laying the foundation for his later work as a publisher of maps and illustrated books.

== Career ==
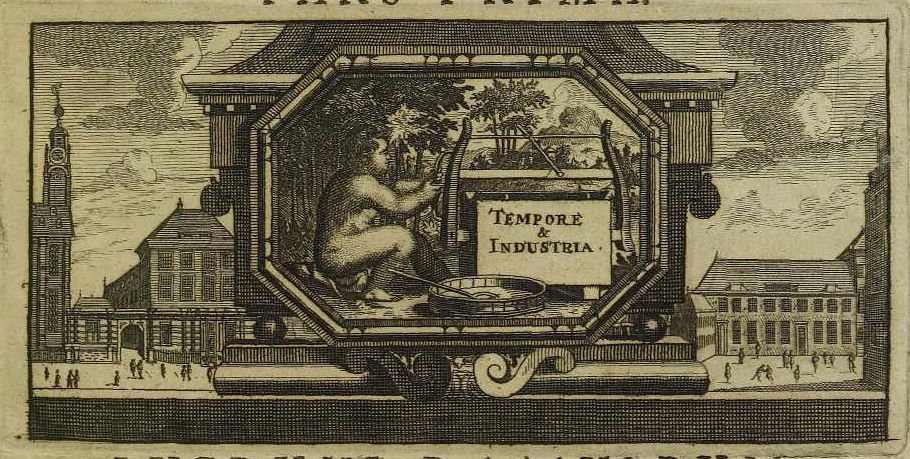
Pieter van der Aa's mark, with the Latin motto Tempore et industria

Pieter van der Aa began his career at Leiden in 1683 as a Latin trade publisher, publishing classical texts pertaining to medicine and science. As he progressed, he began to publish atlases and maps, compiling numerous multi-volume collections of works. Many of these works were assembled from plates acquired from other cartographers rather than engraved by van der Aa himself.

His ambition to become Leiden's most famous printer was fulfilled in 1715 with his appointment to head printer for the city and its university.

One of van der Aa's largest compilations relates to the history of Italy and Sicily, an area of immense personal interest. Though he took credit for many of his compilations, several, such as the Dutch collection of travels to the East Indies and West Indies, were admittedly simple improvements to others' works.

=== Galerie Agréable du Monde ===
Van der Aa's publishing career culminated in the illustrated atlas Galerie Agréable du Monde. Issued in sixty-six parts and containing more than 3,000 plates, the work brought together maps, city views, and scenes of peoples and places from around the world. The plates depicted a wide range of subjects including landscapes, architecture, costumes, and views of cities and monuments.

Many of the engravings used in the atlas had originally been produced by other publishers. Van der Aa later acquired these plates and reused them in his own publications. He often added large decorative borders to the engravings before including them in the collection, a feature that gave the volumes a distinctive visual appearance. The atlas reflected van der Aa's broader publishing practice of compiling large illustrated works from existing cartographic and engraved material.

== Legacy ==
The orchid genus Aa is said to be named after him by the botanist Heinrich Gustav Reichenbach because he was the printer for the Dutch botanist Paul Hermann's "Paradisus Batavus". Published posthumously in 1698, this explanation is disputed.

== Published atlases ==
- Nouvel Atlas
- and the sixty-six volume Galerie Agréable du Monde [Leiden, 1728], of which only 100 copies are said to have been printed.
- Van der Aa, Pieter – F. Draakx schipvaart door de straat en Zuyd Zee gedaan om de gantsen aardkloot. – Leiden, Van der Aa 1706-08 [16 x 23,2 cm]
- Van der Aa, Pieter – Zee-togten door Thomas Candys na de West Indien, en van daar rondom den gantzen aardkloot gedaan.
- Van der Aa, Pieter – *T Noorder deel van Amerika. Door C.Kolumbus in zyn.. Leiden, Van der Aa 1706–08 [16 x 23,6 cm]
- Van der AA, Pieter – Amerika of de Nieuwe Weereld Aller eerst Door C. Kolumbus; Leiden, 1705
- Van der Aa, Piter – Niew (Niue) Engeland in twee Scheeptogten door..John Smith.. Leiden, 1705
- Vander Aa, Pieter – De voor Eylanden van America.. Florida, New Mexico,... Leiden, 1705
- Van der Aa, Pieter, T Vaste Land van Darien ten Zuiden Cuba en Hispaniola Gelege – Leiden, 1705
- Van der Aa, Pieter – Cuba en Jamaica, soo als die door Kolombus.. Leiden, 1705
- Van der Aa, Pieter – Reys togt door Thomas Coryat van Jerusalem; Leiden, 1705
- Van der Aa, Pieter – De zee en land-reysen vandenridder Hendrik Blunt.; Leiden, 1705
- Van der Aa, Pieter – Melite Insula vulgo Malta; Leiden, 1712
- Van der Aa, Pieter – Valetta Civitas Nova Maltae olim Millitae; Leiden, 1712
- The plates in the Leiden University Catalogus librorum of 1716 in Quaerendo, 22, 1992, p. 271–284, ill.

== Gallery ==
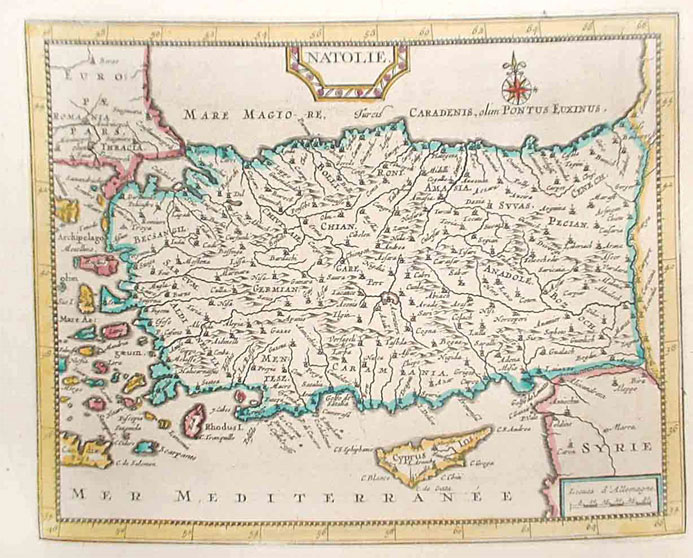
Map of Turkey and Cyprus, 1719

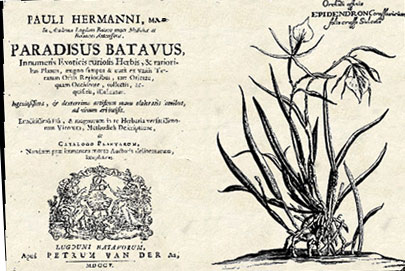
Paradisus Batavus by Paul Hermann

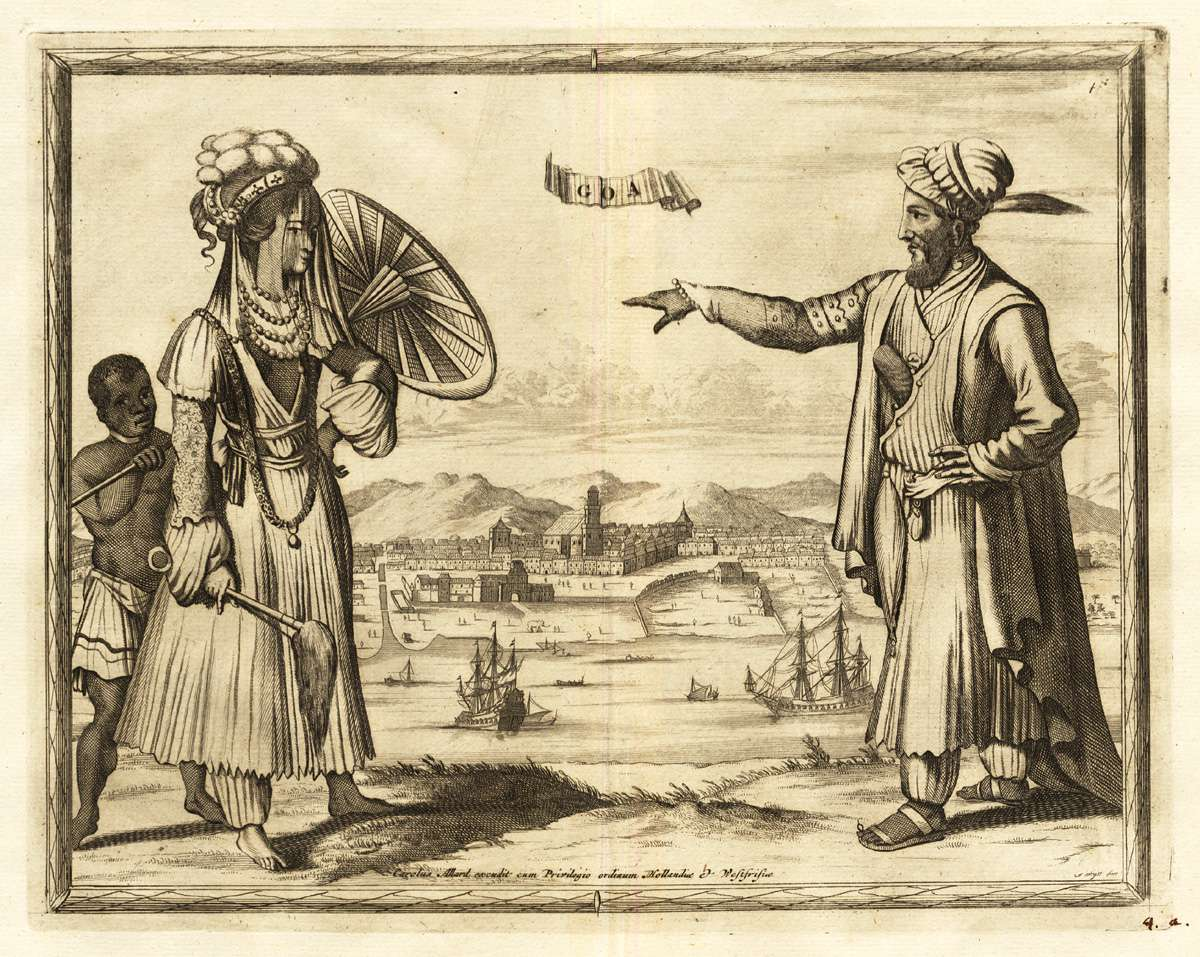
A lady and gentleman of Goa

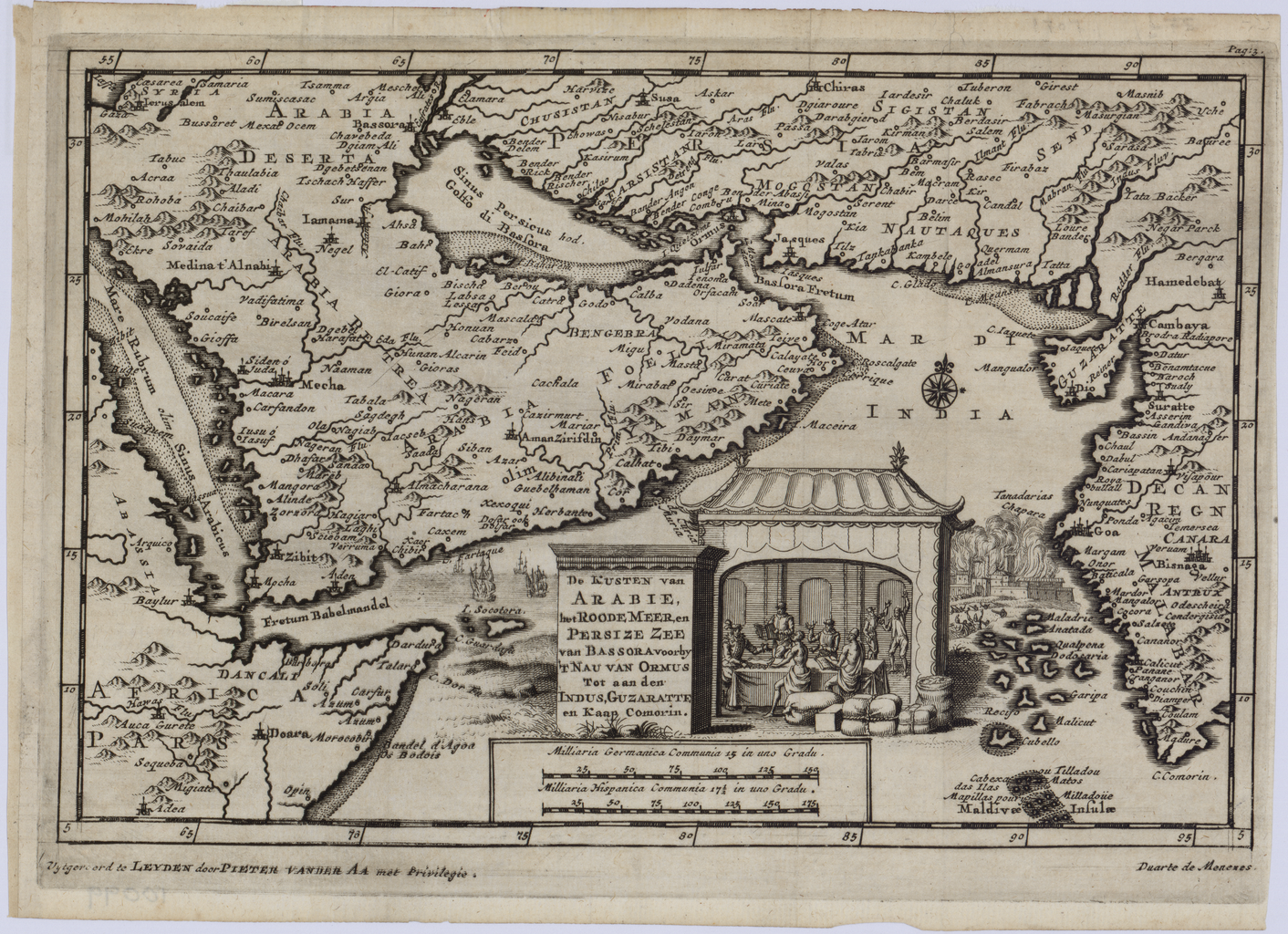
The Coast of Arabia the Red Sea, and Persian Sea of Bassora Past the Straits of Hormuz to India, Gujarat and Cape Comorin, 1707

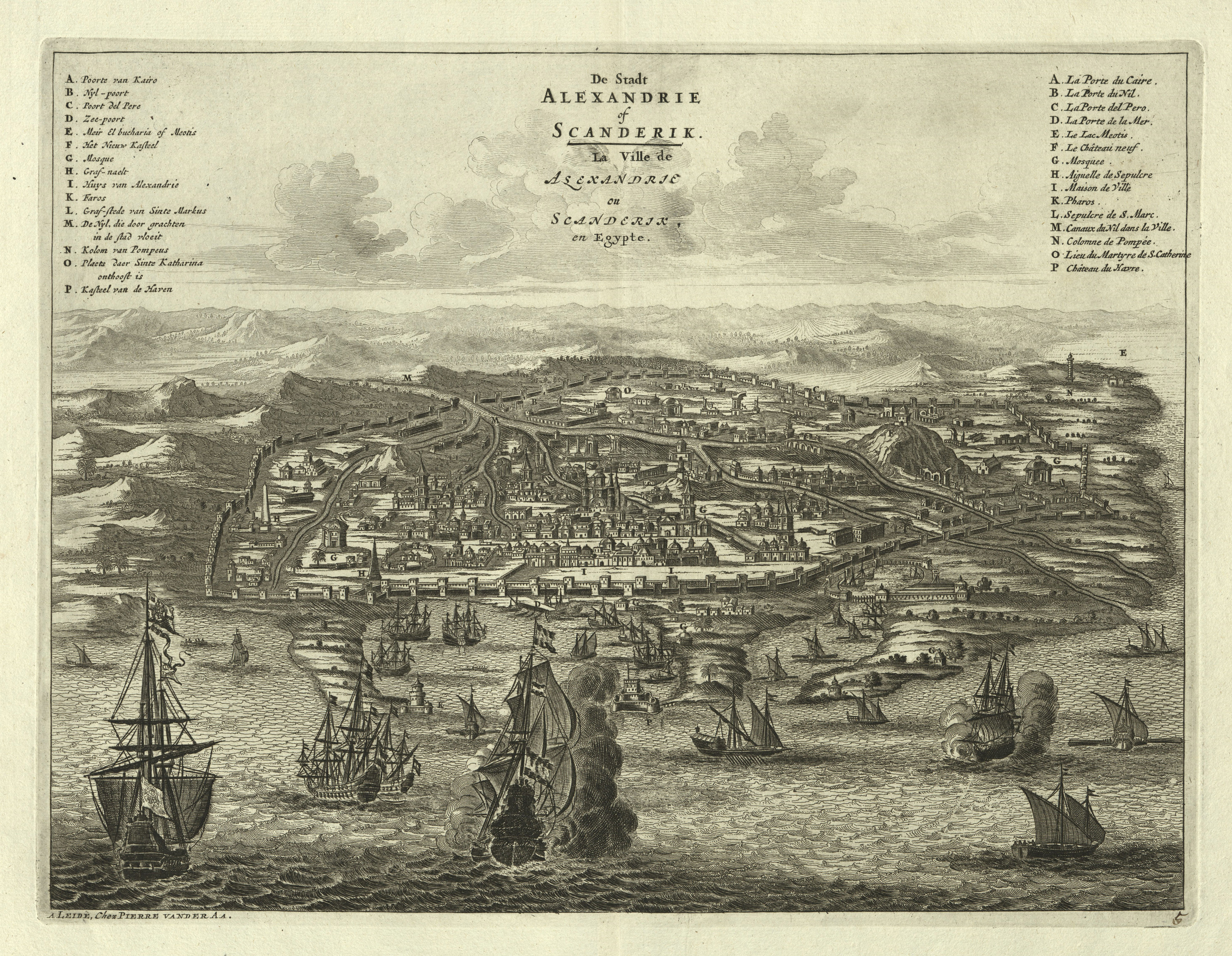
Map of Alexandria, 1720

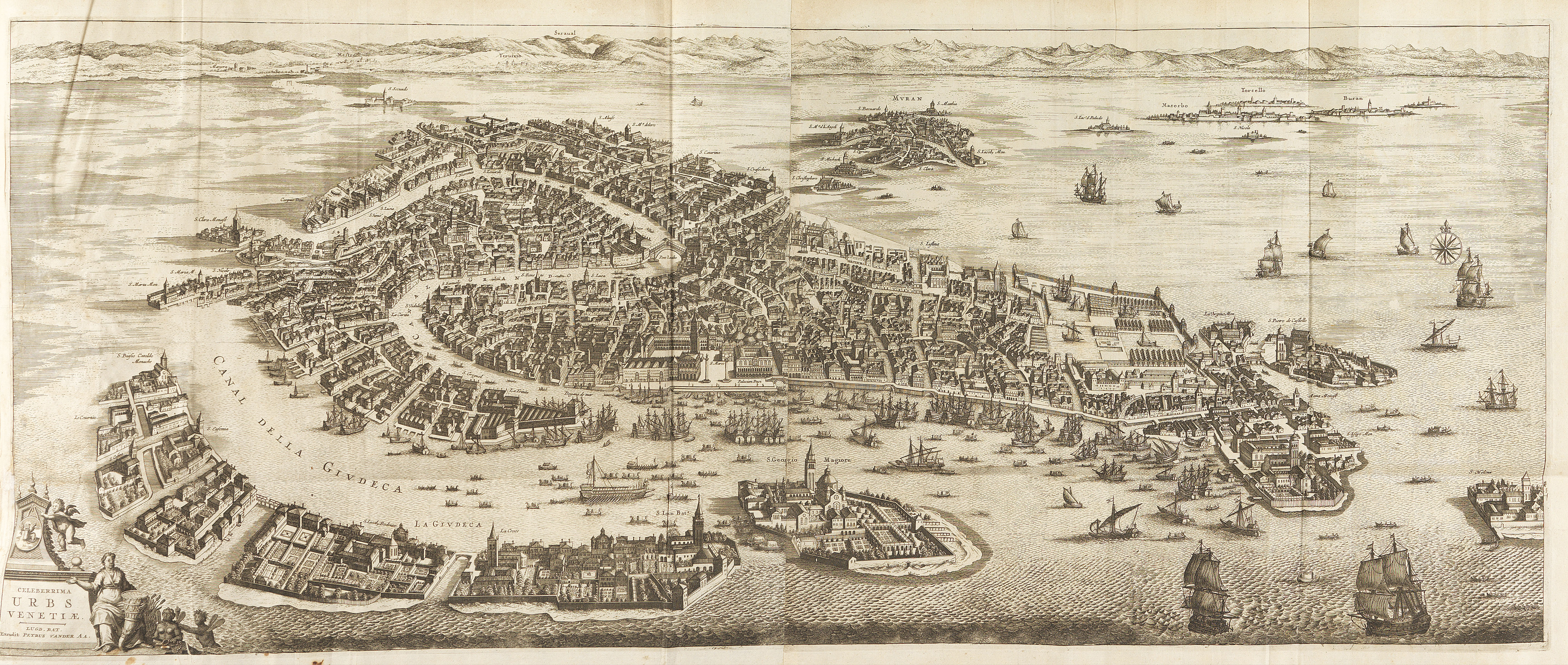
Map of Venice, 1762

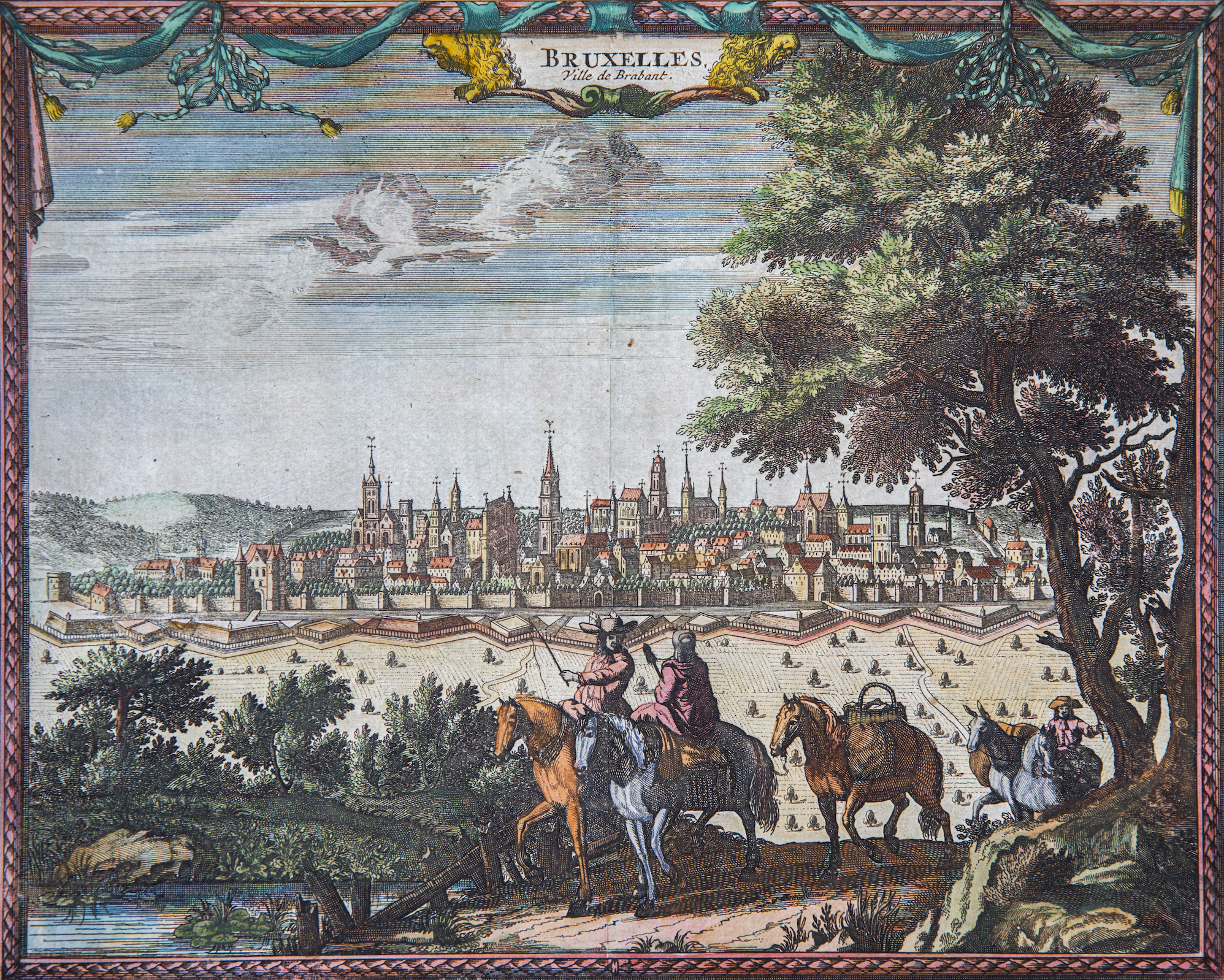
Hand coloured engraving of Brussels as viewed from outside the city walls, 1720.

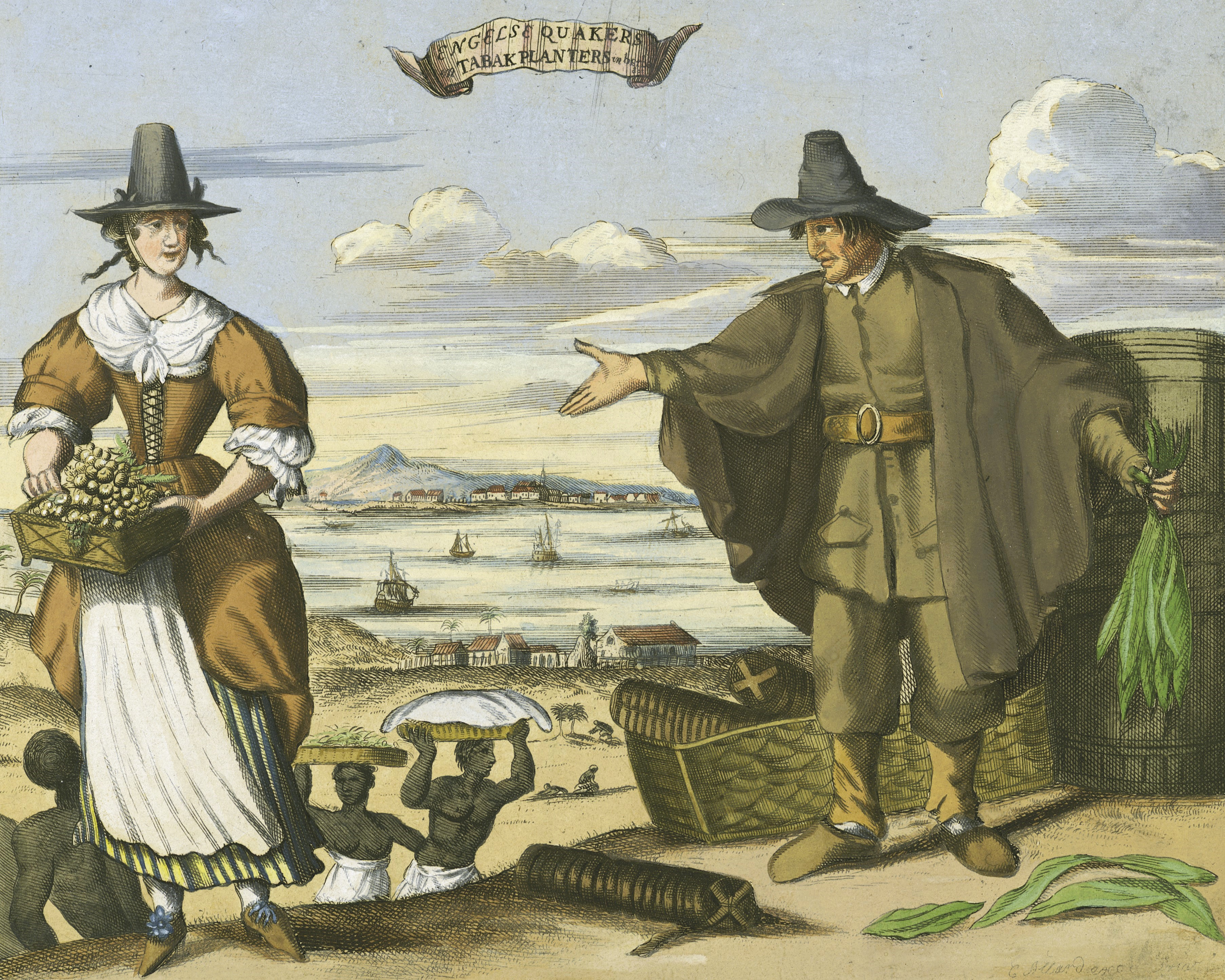
English Quakers Tobacco Planters and Slaves, Barbados, 17th cent.
