= Écarté =

Card game

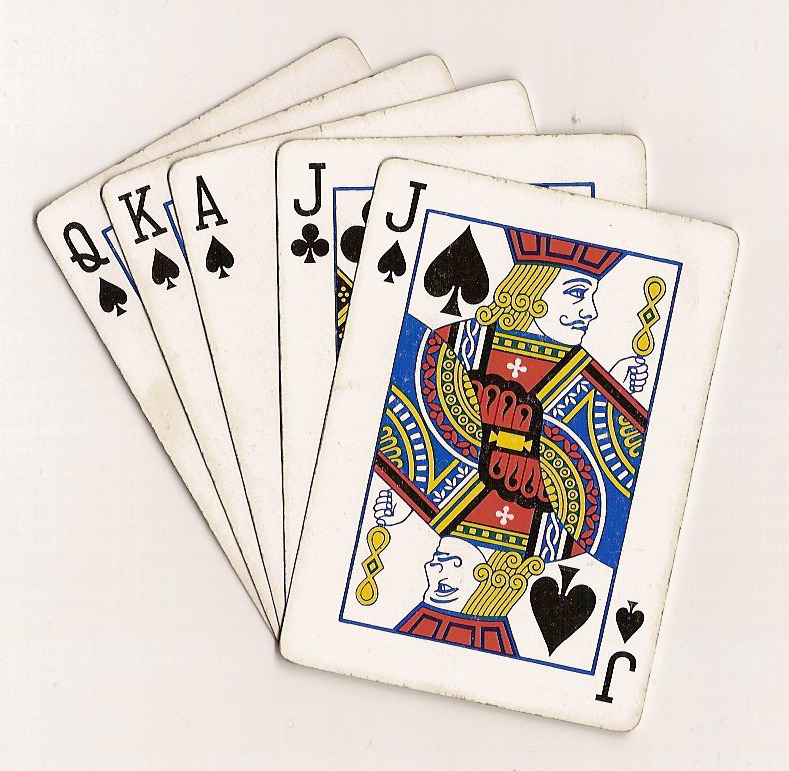
- An Écarté hand
- Origin: France
- Type: Trick-taking
- Players: 2
- Skills: 3
- Cards: 32
- Deck: Piquet
- Rank (high→low): K Q J A 10 9 8 7
- Play: Alternate
- Playing time: 15 min.
- Chance: 7

Related games
- Triomphe • Whist • Euchre • Bourré

Écarté (French: [ekaʁte]) is an old French casino game for two players that is still played today. It is a trick-taking game, similar to whist, but with a special and eponymous discarding phase; the word écarté means "discarded". Écarté was popular in the 19th century, but is now rarely played. It is described as "an elegant two-player derivative of Triomphe [that is] quite fun to play" and a "classic that should be known to all educated card players."

== Play ==
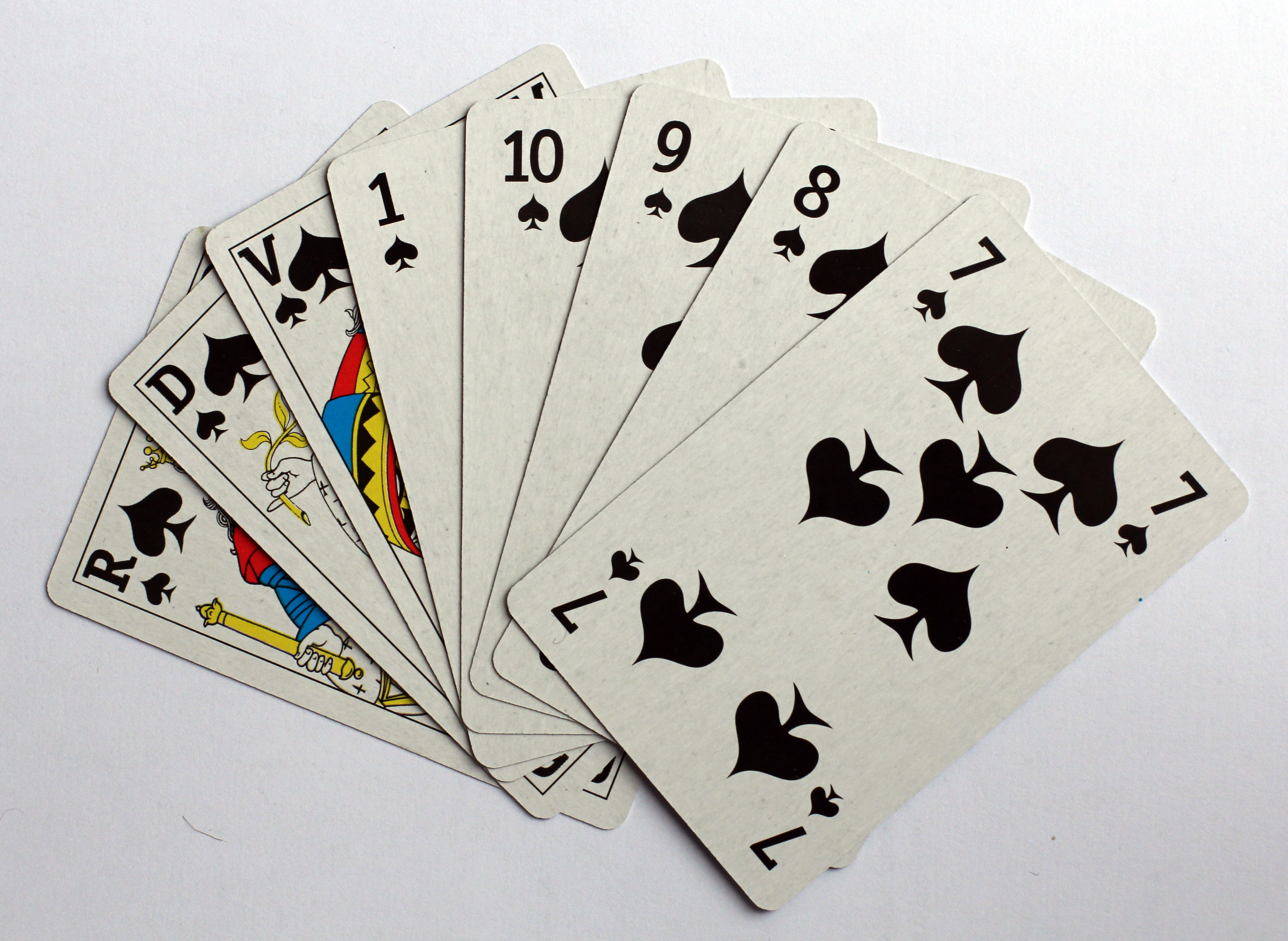
The suit of Spades from a French pack, ranking as in Écarté

All cards from two to six are removed from a 52-card pack, to produce the Piquet pack of thirty-two cards, which rank from the lowest 7, 8, 9, 10, ace, knave, queen, to king high. Note that the ace ranks between ten and knave, making the king the highest card.

The players cut to determine the dealer, who deals five cards each in packets of two and three, or three and two, either to whim or some agreement. The eleventh card is dealt face up to determine the trump suit. If this card is a king, the dealer can immediately mark an extra point for himself.

The elder hand (the player opposite the dealer) is then entitled, if that player so desires, to begin the exchange—a crucial part of the game. This involves discarding cards in order to improve their hand with fresh cards from the remaining pack. To make an exchange, the elder hand must make a proposal to the dealer of a specific number of cards. The dealer must then decide whether or not to accept. If the dealer accepts then the elder hand must propose a discard and the dealer should deal the same number of fresh cards from the pack; following which the dealer must then also make an exchange of at least one card. Once cards have been discarded, they are no longer used, nor looked at. If the proposal was accepted, then the elder hand can make another proposal, if desired, and can go on making proposals as long as the dealer accepts them. This process ends and play begins either at the point that the elder hand chooses not to propose, or the dealer refuses to accept, or the stock of remaining cards runs out.

The elder hand is under no obligation to make any exchange at all. If no initial proposal is made, the elder hand becomes a vulnerable player, leaving the dealer with a chance of scoring an extra point. The dealer suffers the same liability and becomes vulnerable if he refuses the initial proposal made by the opponent. After the initial proposal, the elder hand can decline to propose further and the dealer can refuse to accept at any point, without either player becoming vulnerable.

Before playing the first card, if either player holds the king of trumps, he can mark an extra point for themselves by announcing it. He does not have to do so, but forfeits the right if he forgets to do so before starting play.

The play begins with the elder hand leading the initial trick, after which the winner of the previous trick leads the next. If it is possible to follow suit, then the other player must always do so. The trick is won by the highest card in the suit led. If a trump card is played then the highest trump wins the trick. If a player can win the trick then he must do so.

== Scoring ==
- One point is scored by the dealer by dealing the king face up as the eleventh card.
- One point is scored by marking the king of trumps in a hand before the first card is played.
- One point is scored by the player winning the most tricks.
- One extra point is scored by the winning player if he wins the vole, all five tricks.
- One extra point is scored by defeating a vulnerable player (i.e., taking a majority of the tricks). No extra point is scored for winning the vole against a vulnerable player, however (i.e., the hand is scored for winning the vole the same as if no player had been vulnerable).

Five points wins the game. Play sometimes consists of multiple games as part of a "rubber" or set. Score is often kept with counters or unused cards, similar to Euchre.

== Early 20th-century London Rules ==
The rules of Écarté, as were accepted by the principal clubs in London at the start of the 20th century, and cited in Cavendish, are as follows:

1. Each player has a right to shuffle both his own and his adversary's pack. The dealer has the right to shuffle last.
2. The pack must be shuffled neither below the table, nor in such a manner as to expose the faces of the cards, nor during the play of the hand.
3. A cut must consist of at least two cards, and at least two must be left in the lower packet.
4. A player exposing more than one card when cutting for deal must cut again.
5. The player who cuts the highest Écarté card deals, and has choice of cards and seats. The choice determines both seats and cards during the play.
6. The cut for deal holds good even if the pack be incorrect.
7. If in cutting to the dealer a card be exposed, there must be a fresh cut.
8. The dealer must give five cards to his adversary and five to himself, by two at a time to each, and then by three at a time to each, or vice versa. The dealer, having selected the order in which he will distribute the cards, must not change it during that game; nor may he change it at the commencement of any subsequent game, unless he informs the non-dealer before the pack is cut.
9. If the dealer give more or fewer than five cards to his adversary or to himself, or do not adhere to the order of distribution first selected, and the error be discovered before the trump card is turned, the non-dealer, before he looks at his hand, may require the dealer to rectify the error, or may claim a fresh deal.
10. The hands having been dealt, the dealer must turn up for trump the top card of those remaining.
11. If the dealer turn up more than one card, the non-dealer, before he looks at his hand, may choose which of the exposed cards shall be the trump, or may claim a fresh deal. Should the non-dealer have looked at his hand, there must be a fresh deal.
12. If, before the trump card is turned up, a faced card be discovered in the pack, there must be a fresh deal.
13. If the dealer expose any of his own cards the deal stands good. If he expose any of his adversary's cards, the non-dealer, before he looks at his hand, may claim a fresh deal.
14. If a player deal out of his turn, or with his adversary's pack, and the error be discovered before the trump card is turned up, the deal is void. After the trump card is turned up, it is too late to rectify the error, and if the adversary's pack has been dealt with, the packs remain changed.
15. If, after the trump card is turned up, and before proposing, or, if there is no proposal, before playing, it be discovered that the non-dealer has more than five cards, he may claim a fresh deal. Should the non-dealer not claim a fresh deal, he discards the superfluous cards, and the dealer is not entitled to see them.
16. If, after the trump card is turned up, and before proposing, or, if there is no proposal, before playing, it be discovered that the non-dealer has fewer than five cards, he may have his hand completed from the stock, or may claim a fresh deal.
17. If, after the trump card is turned up, and before the dealer accepts or refuses, or, if there is no proposal, before he plays, it be discovered that he has dealt himself more than five cards, the non-dealer may claim a fresh deal. Should he not claim a fresh deal, he draws the superfluous cards from the dealer's hand. Should the dealer have taken up his hand, the non-dealer is entitled to look at the cards he draws.
18. If, after the trump card is turned up, and before the dealer accepts or refuses, or, if there is no proposal, before he plays, it be discovered that the dealer has fewer than five cards, the non-dealer may permit the dealer to complete his hand from the stock, or may claim a fresh deal.
19. If a fresh deal be not claimed when the wrong number of cards are dealt, the dealer cannot mark the king turned up.
20. If the non-dealer play without taking cards, and it be then discovered that he has more or fewer than five cards, there must be a fresh deal.
21. If the dealer play without taking cards, and it be then discovered that he has more or fewer than five cards, his adversary may claim a fresh deal.
22. If a king be turned up, the dealer is entitled to mark it at any time before the trump card of the next deal is turned up.
23. If either player hold the king of trumps, he must announce it before playing his first card, or he loses the right to mark it. It is not sufficient to mark the king held in hand without announcing it.
24. If the king be the card first led, it may be announced at any time prior to its being played to. If the king be the card first played by the dealer, he may announce it at any time before he plays again.
25. If a player, not holding the king, announce it, and fail to declare his error before he has played a card, the adversary may correct the score, and has the option of requiring the hands to be played over again, notwithstanding that he may have abandoned his hand. If the offender win the point he marks nothing; if he win the vole he marks only one; if he win the point when his adversary has played without proposing, or has refused the first proposal, he marks only one. But if the adversary himself hold the king, there is no penalty.
26. If a player propose, he cannot retract; nor can he alter the number of cards asked for. [Footnote: The elder hand may "propose," i.e. ask for cards, as often as he pleases. If the dealer is not content with his own hand, he will give cards, but after the first proposal, it is entirely at his own option whether or not to do so.]
27. The dealer, having accepted or refused, cannot retract. The dealer, if required, must inform his adversary how many cards he has taken.
28. Each player, before taking cards, must put his discard face downward on the table, apart from the stock, and from his adversary's discard. Cards once discarded must not be looked at.
29. If the non-dealer take more cards than he his discarded, and mix any of them with his hand, the dealer may claim a fresh deal. If the dealer elect to play the hand, he draws the superfluous cards from the non-dealer's hand. Should the non-dealer have taken up any of the cards given him, the dealer is entitled to look at the cards he draws.
30. If the non-dealer asks for fewer cards than he has discarded, the dealer counts as tricks all cards which cannot be played to.
31. If the dealer give his adversary more cards than he has asked for, the non-dealer may claim a fresh deal. If the non-dealer elect to play the hand, he discards the superfluous cards, and the dealer is not entitled to see them.
32. If the dealer give his adversary fewer cards than he has asked for, the non-dealer may claim a fresh deal. If the non-dealer elect to play the hand, he has it completed from the stock.
33. If the dealer give himself more cards than he has discarded, and mix any of them with his hand, the non-dealer may claim a fresh deal. If the non-dealer elect to play the hand, he draws the superfluous cards from the dealer's hand. Should the dealer have taken up any of the cards he has given himself, the non-dealer is entitled to look at the cards he draws.
34. If the dealer give himself fewer cards than he has discarded, he may, before playing, complete his hand from the stock. If the dealer play with fewer than five cards, the non-dealer counts as tricks all cards which cannot be played to.
35. If a face-up card be found in the stock after discarding, both players have a right to see it. The face-up card must be thrown aside, and the next card given instead.
36. If, in giving cards, any of the non-dealer's are exposed, he has the option of taking them; should the non-dealer refuse them, they must be thrown aside and the next cards given instead. If the dealer expose any of his own cards, he must take them.
37. If, after giving the cards, the dealer turn up a card in error, as though it were the trump card, he cannot refuse another discard. If another be demanded, the non-dealer has the option of taking the exposed card.
38. If the dealer accept when there are not sufficient cards left in the stock to enable the players to exchange as many cards as they wish, the non-dealer is entitled to exchange as many as he asked for, or, if there are not enough, at many as there are left, and the dealer must play his hand; the dealer is at liberty to accept, conditionally, on there being cards enough in the stock.
39. A card led in turn cannot be taken up again. A card played to a lead may be taken up again to save a revoke or to correct the error of not winning a trick when able, and then only prior to another card being led.
40. If a card be led out of turn, it may be taken up again, prior to its being played to; after it has been played to, the error cannot be rectified.
41. If the leader name one suit and play another, the adversary may play to the card led, or may require the leader to play the suit named. If the leader have none of the suit named, the card led cannot be withdrawn.
42. If a player abandon his hand when he has not made a trick, his adversary is entitled to mark the vole. If a player abandon his hand after he has made one or two tricks, his adversary is entitled to mark the point. But if a player throw down his cards, claiming to score, the hand is not abandoned, and there is no penalty.
43. If a player renounce when he holds a card of the suit led, or if a player fail to win the trick when able, his adversary has the option of requiring the hands to be played again, notwithstanding that he may have abandoned his hand. If the offender win the point he marks nothing; if he win the vole, he marks only one; if he win the point when his adversary has played without proposing, or has refused the first proposal, he marks only one. Should the card played in error be taken up again prior to another card being led (as provided by Rule 39), there is no penalty.
44. A player may call for new cards at his own expense, at any time before the pack is cut for the next deal. He must call for two new packs, of which the dealer has choice.
45. If a pack be discovered to be incorrect, redundant, or imperfect, the deal in which the discovery is made is void; all preceding deals stand good.
46. The game is five up. By agreement, the game may count a treble if the adversary has not scored; a double if he has scored one or two; a single if he has scored three or four.
47. A player turning up a king, or holding the king of trumps in his hand, is entitled to mark one.
48. A player winning the point is entitled to mark one; a player winning the vole is entitled to mark two.
49. If the non-dealer play without proposing, and fail to win the point, his adversary is entitled to mark two. If the dealer refuse the first proposal, and fail to win the point, the non-dealer is entitled to mark two. These scores apply only to the first proposal or refusal in a hand, and only to the point (the score for the vole being unaffected).
50. If a player omit to mark his score, he may rectify the omission at any time before the trump card of the next deal is turned up.
51. An admitted over-score can be taken down at any time during the game.

== Variations ==
=== Pool and French ===
One of the best known descriptions of Écarté - a treatise by Cavendish written in 1886 that describes the then-current state-of-play in certain London clubs - discusses at least two different variants: Pool Écarté and French Écarté.

Pool Écarté is designed for three players, with only two players playing each hand and one observing. The losing player for the hand then swaps places with the observing player, until one of the players wins two games consecutively.

In French Écarté, observing bystanders are allowed to place certain wagers on the game, similar to some versions of Baccarat, and are also allowed to provide certain input to the players during the course of the game. (In English Écarté, bystanders were permitted to place bets on a game, but were not permitted to comment or provide input.)

=== Rubbers ===
As in other tricking taking games such as Whist, it is common for play to consist of "rubbers" or "sets," where the player who wins the best of three, five, seven, or even eleven games wins the rubber.

=== Ranks ===
For a more modern variation of the game, the cards may be re-ranked with the Ace as the highest card and the King as the second highest card, as in most modern card games.

=== Betting ===
As an old casino game, betting was originally a central feature of Écarté. While this aspect of the game can be simulated with chips similar to Poker or Napoleon, another mechanic that is occasionally used is to permit players to propose to "double" the point value of the hand then in play. This is functionally similar to raising the bet for the hand, though without the necessity of chips or money.

The proposal can be made by either player at any time before the commencement of the third trick (i.e., the mid-point of the hand), and if the other player accepts, the total point value of the hand is doubled for whoever wins (including any points scored due to the vulnerability of one of the players). If the other player declines, however, the hand is immediately concluded (similar to folding in Poker) and the proposing player awarded points as if they had taken a majority of the tricks, but had not taken the vole (i.e., one point in a standard hand, or two points if the player declining to double the value of the hand was vulnerable).

This mechanic permits for some additional complex strategies, such as bluffing.

A similar variation allows either player to "offer[] the point to the opponent," similar to folding in Poker. If the opponent accepts the offer, the hand is immediately concluded and scored as if the opponent had won "the point" (i.e., three or four out of the five available tricks). If the opponent declines the offer, however, they are "bound to win the vole." If they do so, scoring proceeds as normal, but if the player declining the offer fails to win the vole (i.e., if the player who initially offered to fold takes at least one trick), then the player who made the initial offer scores two points. It is unclear from the sources for this variation whether there is any kind of rule on how late in the hand a player is permitted to make an offer, or whether the offer can be made at any time during the course of a hand. Logic would seem to dictate that the offer must come at least prior to the midpoint of the hand (i.e., the third trick), or the offering player would not be offering anything of value to their opponent. If the offering player had already won one of the first three tricks, for instance, then the opposing player would not be able to win the vole; and if the opposing player had already won three tricks, they would already be entitled to score the point being offered. For these reasons, it may be that "offering the point to the opponent" is only permitted in the phase before play begins.

=== Bourré ===
Bourré is sometimes considered a variant of Écarté for more than two players.

== In popular culture ==
Écarté seems to be the card game played by actors in the 1895 Partie de cartes Lumière brothers film.

Écarté is mentioned in The Count of Monte Cristo by Dumas as being a game the French prefer over others, such as whist.

A game of Écarté is played (and described in some detail) by the protagonist in Gaston Leroux's short story "In Letters of Fire", to test a man who claims to have made a deal with the Devil that ensures he can never lose a game.

Écarté is also mentioned in Edgar Allan Poe's 1839 story "William Wilson".

It is played in chapter 10 of the Sherlock Holmes novel The Hound of the Baskervilles. A game of Écarté also figures prominently in Conan Doyle's The Exploits of Brigadier Gerard, Chapter 3, "How the Brigadier Held the King".

It is mentioned in the lyrics of a song from Gilbert and Sullivan's 1889 comic opera The Gondoliers, in which the character of the Duchess of Plaza-Toro sings "At middle class party, I play at Écarté, and I'm by no means a beginner".

The game is mentioned in Chapter VI of The Woman in White by Wilkie Collins, and in Chapter XII of the same author's Man and Wife.

The game is mentioned in Chapter I of Le Crime de Sylvestre Bonnard by Anatole France.

The game is specifically not played in favor of piquet in chapter 5 of Ashenden: Or the British Agent by W. Somerset Maugham

In the film The Happiest Days of Your Life, Arnold Billings, played by Richard Wattis, while introducing the new master to the Common Room, says that "Mathews, the Second Master, plays a good hand at Écarté".

In Chapter XIII of Charles Dickens' The Pickwick Papers, the Club plays "écarte" (sic) at Eatanswill.

Écarté appears to be the game played by Francis Poldark and Matthew Sanson in Season 1, Episode 5 of the BBC show Poldark, and similarly is played by Ross Poldark and Matthew Sanson in Season 1, Episode 6. Francis loses his mine to Matthew in Episode 5 during a high-stakes game of Écarté, before Ross catches Matthew cheating at Écarté in Episode 6.

== See also ==
- Euchre
- Piquet
- Bourré

== Literature ==
- Cavendish (1886). Cavendish on Écarté. London: de la Rue.
- Parlett, David (2008). The Penguin book of card games. London: Penguin. ISBN 978-0-141-03787-5.
- Cavendish (2017). The laws of Écarté - Adopted by The Turf and Portland Clubs with a Treatise on the Game. Washington DC: Westphalia Press. ISBN 978-1-63391-537-4.
- Cady, A. Howard (1896). Écarté: A Treatise on the Game with Some Historical Notes on Its Origin. New York: American Sports Publishing Co.
