= LXIII Corps =

LXIII Corps or 63rd Corps may refer to:

- 63rd Corps (People's Republic of China)
- 63rd Corps (German Empire)
- LXIII Army Corps, Wehrmacht, Germany
- 63rd Rifle Corps, Soviet Union
- 63rd Lanarkshire Rifle Volunteer Corps, United Kingdom
- 63rd (Toxteth) Lancashire Rifle Volunteer Corps, United Kingdom

== See also ==
- List of military corps by number
- 63rd Army (disambiguation)
- 63rd Brigade (disambiguation)
- 63rd Division (disambiguation)
- 63rd Regiment (disambiguation)
- 63rd (disambiguation)
