= 63rd Cavalry =

63rd Cavalry may refer to:

- 63rd Cavalry (India)
- 63rd Cavalry Division (Soviet Union), a Soviet division
- 63rd Cavalry Division (United States)
- 63rd (Wiltshire) Company, Imperial Yeomanry

== See also ==
- 63rd Division (disambiguation)
- 63rd Brigade (disambiguation)
- 63rd Regiment (disambiguation)
- 63rd (disambiguation)
