= 63rd Army =

63rd Army may refer to:

- 63rd Group Army, People's Liberation Army, China
- 63rd Army (Soviet Union)

== See also ==
- List of armies by number
- 63rd Division (disambiguation)
- 63rd Brigade (disambiguation)
- 63rd Regiment (disambiguation)
- 63rd (disambiguation)
