= Smear (card game) =

North American trick-taking card game

- Origin: United States
- Alternative names: Schmier
- Type: Trick-taking
- Players: 3–6 (4 best)
- Cards: 52–54
- Deck: French
- Rank (high→low): A K Q J 10 9 8 7 6 5 4 3 2
- Play: Clockwise

Related games
- All fours, pitch, Pedro; minor influence from euchre

Smear (also known as Schmier) is a North-American trick-taking card game of the all fours group, and a variant of pitch (setback). Several slightly different versions are played in Michigan, Minnesota, Northern and Central Iowa, Wisconsin and also in Ontario, Canada.

It is highly likely that the name is related to the German word schmieren, which is used in point-trick games such as skat for the technique of discarding a high-value card on a trick which your partner is winning. The name might perhaps be connected to the fact that a high-scoring card may be discarded in a trick won by the player's partner, like in pinochle, or even to "smudge," which is the highest bid in some forms of pitch.

== Ten-point partnership smear ==
Partnership smear is played by four players in fixed partnerships, sitting crosswise. It can also be played by six players in three partnerships. The following version is one of several described by John McLeod.

=== Deck and basic game structure ===
Card values
Rank (trumps)	A	K	Q	J	Ji	Jo	Jo	10	9	8	7	6	5	4	3	2
Value	4	3	2	1		0		10	0							
Rank (non-trumps)	A	K	Q	(J)		—		10	9	8	7	6	5	4	3	2

The game is played with a deck of 54 cards including two jokers (Jo). The cards are ranked in the usual order, aces ranking high. In a feature borrowed from euchre, the jack that is not trump but of the same color as the trump suit is known as the jick (Ji) or left bower. The left bower and the two jokers are considered to be part of the trump suit, where they rank below the right bower and above the ten. In case both jokers are played to the same trick, the second ranks higher than the first.

Smear is a point-trick game, i.e. the winner of game is determined by the total value of the cards won in tricks, rather than the number of tricks won. The card-values are ace = 4, king = 3, queen = 2, jack = 1, ten = 10, all other cards = 0 regardless of suit.

The first dealer is decided by cutting. After each hand has been played, up to ten points can be won by players in total. (These are 1 point each for holding the highest or lowest trump in play, for winning one of the bowers or jokers, and for winning the trick-play. Finally 3 points for winning the three of trumps.) The first player to score 21 points over several deals is the winner of the game. ("21 up".)

=== Deal, bidding and card play ===
The dealer shuffles the deck, and the player to the dealer's right cuts. Ten cards are dealt to each player.

Beginning with the eldest hand, each player gets one chance to bid for the privilege of declaring the trump suit. A bid is the number of points that the bidder undertakes to win in the deal, the minimum bid being 1. Each player must make a higher bid than any previous player, or pass. The player who wins the bid, known as the pitcher or maker, must win as many points as he or she bid, or is set back by the amount of the bid.

After declaring the trump suit, the pitcher takes up the remaining stock of 14 cards and discards 8 of them to get down to six cards. Everybody else discards four cards to get down to six. The discarded cards must not include any trumps, unless that cannot be avoided because the player holds more than six trumps. The pitcher leads a trump to the first trick.

Trick-play is as in all fours, i.e. the standard rules for card play in trick-taking games hold, with the following exception: It is always allowed to trump instead of following suit ("follow suit or trump"). As usual, the highest card of the suit led wins each trick, unless a trump is played, in which case the highest trump played wins. The winner of a trick leads to the next trick.

=== Scoring ===
At most ten points can be won in a deal:

High	For the original owners of the highest trump played in trick play.
Low	For the original owners of the lowest trump played in trick play.
Jack	For winning the trick containing the Jack of trumps.
Jick	For winning the trick containing the Jick.
Joker 1	For winning the trick containing the first Joker.
Joker 2	For winning the trick containing the second Joker.
Game	For winning the greatest number of card-points in tricks.
Trey	3 points for winning the trick containing the Three of trumps.

The Jack point is not awarded if no player held the Jack of trumps, and the Game point is not awarded in case of a tie. Players may receive points even if they did not win the auction.

A pitcher who did not win at least the number of points undertaken with the bid does not receive any of the points, and is instead set back by the amount of the bid. Negative scores are possible.

If more than one party reaches the required number of points to win the game, the party with the higher score wins. In case of a tie the pitching party wins.

== Variants ==
=== Common minor variations ===
- The game may be played with up to 8 players with cards removed from the deck and only a possibility of 5 points to bid on, unless someone shoots the moon which is worth 11 points and consists of getting all 5 points (this also threatens going back 11 as well if the bid isn't made) 1. High 2. Low 3. Jack 4. Jick 5. Game

The game may be played for a different number of points.

- If the Jokers are distinguishable, one may rank higher than the other.
- The game may be played without the Jokers or with only one Joker.
- The game may be played without Jick (i.e. the Jick is an ordinary member of its suit).
- The game may be played without the 3 points for Trey.
- The points for Jokers may be awarded for holding them at the beginning rather than catching them in a trick.
- The minimum bid may be 4 points.

=== With nine cards ===
The following variant was described by David Parlett.

Each player is dealt nine cards. After the pitcher has declared trumps, each player discards all non-trumps and receives as many cards as necessary to bring their hand back to six. A player who holds more than six trumps must keep all trumps. During trick-play, only trumps may be played. Any player holding more than six cards must play the extra cards to the first trick. Players drop out of the game as they run out of trumps. If a player wins a trick with their last trump, the following player leads to the next trick.

The Joker points are awarded to the owners, not winners, of the two Jokers. The game is 21 up or 31 up. Only the pitching party can win the game.

=== With a "widow" ===
Each player receives 9 cards in batches of 3. At some point in between a widow of 4 cards is put aside.

The minimum bid is 4 points. The pitcher takes up the widow before declaring the trump suit. All players except the pitcher discard all their non-trumps and receive replacements as necessary to bring their hands back to six cards. Finally the pitcher picks up the remaining stock and discards down to six cards. The pitcher need not lead a trump to the first trick.

A player with more than six trumps (including the pitcher after picking up the stock, if applicable) will have to discard trumps, but may not discard any that have scoring value.

The point for Low is replaced by a point for Deuce, i.e. for owning the Two of trumps at the beginning. Similar to the Fool in Tarot games, if the Two of trumps gets lost in a trick, its owner takes it back and puts it to their own party's tricks, to facilitate scoring.

The point for "Game" is replaced by a point for the ten of trumps. This simplifies scoring and eliminates the need to count card points.

One possible bid is shooting the moon. This is the same as winning the maximum number of points possible, but for higher stakes: In case of success the pitching party immediately wins the game. (However, if the pitching party previously had a negative score it is merely reset to 0.) In case of failure the pitching party loses the game.

In the three-handed cutthroat variation, the minimum bid is three.

=== Five Point Team Smear ===
Five point Smear can be played with 4, 6, or 8 people. In each way, the group is split into two teams. 6 handed Smear is the favored form of play.

The game is played with a 53 card deck, only one Joker. When playing 8 handed all cards are left in the deck. 6 cards are dealt to each player and five cards are left in the blinds, or "sleeping". (they are not played or used by anyone). But some use 3 cards to make a kiddy which the winning bidder gets to exchange cards with and 2 are left "sleeping" or unused.

When playing 6 handed, the 3's, 4's, and 5's are removed from the deck. 6 cards are dealt to each player and five cards are left in the blinds.

When playing 4 handed, the 3's, 4's, 5's, 6's, 7's and 8's are removed from the deck. 6 cards are dealt to each player and five cards left in the blinds.

Smear involves the card concept of "trump". Each player bids on their hand depending on the value of the cards. The highest bidder lays the first card. The suit the player leads in becomes trump for that deal of cards. Smear follows the basic value system of any game: A, K, Q, J, 10, 9, 8, 7, 6, 5, 4, 3, 2, Jo. The Ace is highest. Any member of the trump suit is worth more than a non-trump card (Ex. If hearts is trump, the 3 of hearts beats the Ace of clubs). The Joker is considered trump in every deal, but is always the lowest value trump.

The highest bidder leads the first trick. After the first, the winner of the trick leads the next. Each player must play in turn following in a clockwise circle.

The players are split into two teams. If 4 handed, two teams of 2. If 6 handed, two teams of 3. If 8 handed, two teams of 4. Teammates are split by every other seating. You cannot sit next to one of your partners.

After each hand the cards are pulled into a pile by the team that won that trick. It is important that the cards of different teams are not mixed. They must be counted in the end.

The goal of Smear is to match the points of you or your teams bid, or to prevent the opposing team from matching their bid. There are Five major points to collect in each deal: HIGH, LOW, JACK, JOKER, GAME. HIGH is the highest value trump card, almost always the ace. LOW, the lowest member of trump, belongs to the player who held it. It does not need to be won in a trick. It is typically the two if it is not sleeping, and should be left on the table once played. The JACK of trump and the JOKER must be won in a trick. GAME is an accumulation of all the points won by either team.

For counting GAME the value of each card is as follows. A-4 pts, K-3 pts, Q-2 pts, J-1 pt, 10-10 pts, 9 through 2- 0 pts, Jo-0 pts.
