= 63 =

63 or sixty-three may refer to:

- 63 (number), the natural number following 62 and preceding 64
- one of the years 63 BC, AD 63, 1963, 2063
- +63, the telephone country code for the Philippines
- Flight 63 (disambiguation)
- 63 (Las Vegas), a shopping mall
- 63 (album), by Tree63
- 63 (mixtape), by Kool A.D.
- "Sixty Three", a song by Karma to Burn from the album Mountain Czar, 2016
- 63 Ausonia, a main-belt asteroid
- Sixty-three (card game), Canadian card game

== See also ==
- 63rd (disambiguation)
