= Setback =

Setback may refer to:

- Setback (architecture), making upper storeys of a high-rise building further back than the lower ones for aesthetic, structural, or land-use restriction reasons
- Setback (land use), a dimensional standard commonly addressed under land use regulations, which define the required distances that a building, structure, or land use may exist from a boundary or natural feature (e.g. wetlands, flood plains, etc).
- Pitch (card game), a card game related to All Fours
- A problem
- Setback arming, a safety-arming mechanism used on some munition fuzes
- Setbacks (album), 2011 album by ScHoolboy Q
- Naksa (lit. 'Setback'), exodus of Palestinians in the aftermath of the Six-Day War
