= Sixty-three (card game) =

Card game popular in New Brunswick, Canada

Sixty-three is a card game popular in Charlotte County, New Brunswick, and on Cape Breton Island, Nova Scotia, and is named after the number of points which can be taken in a hand. This game is nearly identical to the Pitch variant Pedro. It also has features reminiscent of Euchre.

== Rules ==
=== Setup ===
Sixty-three is played by four players, in two teams, and uses a full deck of cards plus one joker. The players on the same team should sit opposite each other, and any 'table talk' or transfer of information about the games between partners is strictly forbidden.

=== Deal ===
The dealer will customarily offer to let the person to their right cut the deck prior to a hand. The players are dealt 9 cards each (given out to each player three cards at a time), after which a bid round ensues to determine which suit will be trump.

=== Auction ===
Each player bids based on the number of points he/she feels that their team can take, with the minimum bid being 40 and the maximum bid being 63 (hence the name of the game). The player willing to bid the highest will 'take the hand' and be able to decide which suit will be trump. It is not unusual for partners to bid against each other if they both have a good hand. Bidding should be done aggressively to try to ensure that trump is picked by either yourself or your teammate, however, should a team fail to 'make their bid', i.e. they fail to take as many points as they bid, then their score will drop by the amount of their bid. A king, the card worth the most points (see below), is generally required in a hand before it is considered biddable. If no bids are placed prior to the dealer then the bid is taken by the dealer for the default bid of 25.

=== Re-deal ===
After the bidding, players discard all non-trump cards in their hands, and the dealer deals more cards from the remainder of the deck until each player has six in their hand, with all cards remaining going to the dealer to pick through so all trump are in play. Should a player have more than six trump in their hand, then they may give the excess trump to their partner, provided it is a card not worth any points (see below) and that the transfer is carried out face-up so the other team may see. Any cards now in the hand which are not trump are referred to as dirt.

=== Play ===
The person who won the bid then plays the lead card in the first hand (he must lead trump in the first hand), and the players then attempt to take as many points for their team as possible in the ensuing rounds. A round consists of each player playing one card, with the winner of the round playing the lead card in the next round. If trump is lead, all players must follow suit if they can. Should a dirt card be lead, then players may either play dirt as well (any suit), or trump should they choose to. Any trump card will take any dirt card. Should a player run out of trump, they may play all their remaining cards in one hand and be considered out of the hand. The hand is finished when all players have played all their cards. The game ends when one team reaches 250 points (usually five to ten hands will be required for this).

== Card values and ranking ==
The cards are arranged in descending order of rank with point values shown for those which are counters. The 'opposite 5' means the 5 which is the same colour as trump (e.g. the 5 of clubs is opposite the 5 of spades). The 2 (including its one point) is always kept by the person who plays it, regardless of who wins the hand. These point values apply only for cards of the trump suit as decided in the bidding round - all 'dirt' suits are worthless.

- Ace - 1 point
- King - 25 points
- Queen
- Jack - 1 point
- 10 - 1 point
- 9 - 9 points
- 8
- 7
- 6
- 5, opposite 5 - 5 points
- 4
- 3
- 2 - 1 point
- Joker - 15 points

In Inverness County, Cape Breton Island, the trump 3 is worth 15 and the joker is not used. In Queens County, New Brunswick, the trump 2 is worth 2, and the 10 is worth 0 points. Game is 225.
