= 63rd =

63rd is the ordinal form of the number 63. 63rd or Sixty-third may also refer to:

- A fraction, 1/63, equal to one of 63 equal parts

== Geography ==
- 63rd meridian east, a line of longitude
- 63rd meridian west, a line of longitude
- 63rd parallel north, a circle of latitude
- 63rd parallel south, a circle of latitude
- 63rd Street (disambiguation)

Metro stations

- Ashland/63rd (CTA station), on the Green Line
- East 63rd-Cottage Grove (CTA), on the Green Line
- 63rd (CTA Red Line), on the Red Line
- 63rd Street station (SEPTA Market–Frankford Line) on the Market-Frankford Line in West Philadelphia

Railroad stations

- 63rd Street (Metra station) an electric commuter railroad shared by the Metra Electric service and South Shore Line (NICTD) in Chicago

Trolley stops

- 63rd and Malvern Loop (SEPTA station) a terminus of one of the SEPTA Subway–Surface Trolley Lines in Northwest Philadelphia
- 63rd Street station (SEPTA Route 15), a SEPTA Route 15 trolley stop in Carrol Park, Philadelphia

Metro lines

- 63rd Street Line of the New York City Subway, two lines served by multiple services

== Military ==
- 63rd Army (Soviet Union)
- 63rd Division (disambiguation)
- 63rd Regiment (disambiguation)

== Other ==
- 63rd century
- 63rd century BC

== See also ==
- 63 (disambiguation)
