= 63rd Street station =

63rd Street station may refer to:

- 63rd station, a rapid transit station in Chicago, Illinois
- 63rd Street station (Metra), a commuter rail station in Chicago, Illinois
- 63rd Street station (SEPTA Metro), an elevated station in Philadelphia, Pennsylvania
- 63rd Street & Malvern Avenue station, a streetcar stop in Philadelphia, Pennsylvania
- Ashland/63rd station, an elevated station in Chicago, Illinois
- Lexington Avenue–63rd Street station, a subway station in Manhattan, New York

== See also ==
- 63rd Street (disambiguation)
