= Phat (card game) =

English trick-taking partnership card game

- Big Phat and Little Phat if ♦ are trumps
- Origin: England
- Type: Trick-taking
- Players: 4
- Skills: Memory, Attention
- Cards: 52 cards
- Deck: French
- Rank (high→low): A K Q J 10 9 ... 2
- Play: Clockwise
- Playing time: 30 min.
- Chance: Easy

Related games
- All fours • Don

Phat is an English trick-taking partnership card game descended from the 17th century game of all fours. It is closely related to the British and Irish game of Don and may have been derived from it during the First World War. Phat is still played in England in Herefordshire, Cheshire, Staffordshire, Norfolk and Suffolk. In Scotland it is known around Motherwell and Wishaw.

== History ==
In Hereford there is a tradition that Phat was imported by US servicemen stationed there during the Second World War. Other accounts, however, suggest that Fat was played in England during the First World War by, for example, "London bus drivers and clippies". This early date is corroborated by Cassells in his 1918 book on the wartime record of the Black Watch, a Scottish regiment, where Phat is described as "a common card game among the Tommies".

Its military connexion is reinforced by a passing mention in the 1938 edition of St. George's Gazette where "the usual game of Phat is getting popular again" among soldiers of the Royal Northumberland Fusiliers.

Phat was also once common in the East Anglian counties of Norfolk and Suffolk and, in 1990, it was played "on a highly organised league basis in and around Norwich". However, by 2018 only two pubs in the Norwich area were regularly hosting Phat drives: the Wherry Inn at Geldeston, which played an unusual variant where the trump 10 was Big Phat and trump 5 was Little Phat, and the Rumburgh Buck, which lies over the county border in Rumburgh, Suffolk.

== Object ==
The aim of the game is to score points by winning tricks containing valuable cards which may give an immediate score to the team that wins the trick to which they have been played; these points may be called the phat. Further points are pegged after the end of the play by the team that has collected more than half of the muck in their tricks. There are 88 points in each deal - 80 phat plus 8 for the muck.

== Card ranking ==
Phat is played by four players sitting crosswise in two partnerships. The cards rank A K Q J 10 9 8 7 6 5 4 3 2 in every suit.

A standard 52-card pack is used and 13 cards are dealt to each player, one at a time. Points are recorded on a Phat board, up to a yard long and resembling a Cribbage board, but with 90 holes (per team) instead of the usual 60, which facilitates scoring to 181.

== Deal and play ==
Each player cuts a card from the pack and whoever cuts the lowest card will pitch first (i.e. lead to the first trick). The dealer will be the player to the right of the pitcher and the turn to deal and play passes to the left. The trump is determined by the first card led by the pitcher and subsequently players must follow suit if possible, but otherwise may play any card. The trick is taken by the highest card of the suit led, or by the highest trump if any are played, and the winner of each trick then leads to the next.

=== Scoring ===
==== Scoring the phat ====
During play, the following cards won in tricks entitle the trick-winner to peg his side the corresponding points as follows:

Card	Score
9	18 if trump, 9 if non-trump
5	10 if trump, 5 if non-trump
Trump Ace	4
Trump King	3
Trump Queen	2
Trump Jack	1

==== Scoring the muck ====
When play has ended, each side counts the muck, the card point value of all counting cards it has won in tricks on the following basis:

Card	Score
Each Ace	4
Each King	3
Each Queen	2
Each Jack	1
Each 10	10

The side with the greater aggregate value, pegs eight holes on the Phat board. Thus, in each deal, there are 88 points to be played for: 80 phat points and 8 muck points. The game continues until one side wins by reaching or exceeding a score of 181 points.

== Don ==
=== History and distribution ===
Don is a related game usually called Nine-card Don, but also Big Don, Long Don and Welsh Don. It was originally known as Don Pedro, not to be confused with the related American game of Dom Pedro.

An 1864 English dictionary of slang relates that "five fingers" is the five of trumps in game of "five-cards or Don" and that "Don Pedro" is "a low game at cards [that] is a compound of all fours, and the Irish game variously termed all fives, five and ten, fifteen, forty-five, &c. It was no doubt invented by the mixed English and Irish rabble who fought in Portugal in 1832-33." (Note: Five cards was a much earlier Irish game related to the others mentioned. The nickname "five fingers" for the trump 5 was transferred to its offshoot, Spoil Five.) Don Pedro may have been the forerunner of the American game of Dom Pedro, although the two have different rules. It was probably named after the victor in the Portuguese civil war, Dom Pedro, who had been supported by British troops. By the 1870s, it was commonly known as Don.

Nine-card Don is played in England in Lancashire, Cheshire and Staffordshire, and also in South Wales. It is still popular in the military, notably in the Cheshire and Staffordshire Regiments (now the 1st and 3rd battalions of the Mercian Regiment respectively). Meanwhile Irish Don is played in Dublin and Cork.

=== Overview ===
Four players sitting crosswise in partnerships receive 9 cards each from a standard 52-card pack. The aim is to score for certain cards (counting cards) in tricks. The game is 91 or 121 up and the scores are pegged on a Cribbage board of 60 or 90 holes per side. The cards rank are as follows:

Table of Point Value for Trumps and the Plain Suit
Nine	the team scores 9 points	Ace	the team counts 4 points toward the game score
Five	the team scores 10 points	King	the team counts 3 points toward the game score
Ace	the team scores 4 points	Queen	the team counts 2 points toward the game score
King	the team scores 3 points	Jack	the team counts 1 point toward the game score
Queen	the team scores 2 points	10	the team counts 10 points toward the game score
Jack	the team scores 1 point	9, 8, 7, 6	the team scores 0 each
10, 8, 7, 6	the team scores 0 each	5	the team scores 5 points
4, 3, 2	the team scores 0 each	4, 3, 2	the team scores 0 each

Thus there are 44 points to be won during play and 8 more for "game" at the end of play, making a total of 52 points available per deal (unlike the 88 in standard Phat).

=== Deal and play ===
One player from each team cuts a card from the pack and whoever cuts the highest card will pitch first. The dealer will be the player to the right of the pitcher and the turn to deal and play passes always to the left. The player to the dealer's left leads first and the suit he plays establishes trumps. Others must follow suit if possible, otherwise may play any card. The trick is taken by the highest card led or by the highest trump if any are played. Each trick-winner leads to the next.

=== Scoring ===
During play, each side pegs immediately the value of any trump counters and Fives taken in tricks. After play, each side counts all counting cards taken in tricks (Aces, Kings, Queens, Jacks, 10s - as shown in the table above) known as the game score. The side with the greater total pegs 8 extra.

A slight variation is that a side will claim 6 points for the highest total plus one for the highest trump and another one for the jack of trumps (meaning that sometimes only 7 bonus points are scored). Another variation is to score 5 points for the highest total and one for high trump, one for low trump and one for jack of trumps (again meaning that sometimes only 7 bonus points are scored).

== Bibliography ==
- _ (1938). St. George's Gazette (1938), Vol. 56.
- Cassells, Joe (1918). The Black Watch: A Record in Action. Doubleday.
- Cotton, Charles (1674). The Compleat Gamester. London: A.M.
- Leland, C.G. (1889). A Dictionary of Slang, Jargon & Cant, Vol. 1 (A–K). Edinburgh: Ballantyne.
- Parlett, David (1992). Oxford Dictionary of Card Games. Oxford: OUP. ISBN 0-19-869173-4
- Singer, Samuel Weller (1816). Researches into the History of Playing Cards. London: Robert Triphook.
