= Cinch (card game) =

American trick-taking card game

- Origin: United States
- Alternative names: Double Pedro, high five
- Type: Trick-taking
- Family: All fours
- Players: 2×2 or 2–6
- Cards: 52
- Deck: French
- Rank (high→low): A K Q J 10 9 8 7 6 5 4 3 2
- Play: Clockwise

Related games
- Auction Pitch • Pedro

Cinch, also known as Double Pedro or High Five, is an American trick-taking card game of the all fours family derived from Auction Pitch via Pedro. Developed in Denver, Colorado in the 1880s, it was soon regarded as the most important member of the all fours family in the USA, but went out of fashion with the rise of Auction Bridge. The game is primarily played by 4 players in fixed partnerships, but can also be played by 2–6 individual players.

The game uses a regular pack of 52 cards. As in Pedro, all points are awarded to the winners of the tricks containing certain cards rather than to the players who originally held them. This includes the Game point, which goes to the winner of the trump Ten. Five points each go the winner of the Right Pedro (Five of trumps) and Left Pedro (Off-Five), respectively. The game is played for, for example, 42 or 51 points, of which up to 14 can be won in a single deal.

The name Cinch comes from a Mexican word that is applied to the practice of securing the tricks that contain a Left or Right Pedro, but it was once also common to refer to the Left Pedro as the Cinch.

== Rules ==
The following rules are based on Foster's Complete Hoyle of 1897 and are very similar to the modern Bicycle rules.

Card values (trumps only)
Rank	A	K	Q	J	10	9	8	7	6	5	Off-5	4	3	2
Value	1	—		1	1	—				5	5	—		1

The game is played with a standard pack of 52 cards. The cards are ranked in the usual order, Aces ranking high. As a special case, the Off-Five, i.e. the non-trump Five which is of the same color as trumps, is for all purposes considered to be a member of the trump suit ranking between the Five and Four of trumps.

Like Pitch, Cinch is a point-trick game, i.e. for winning the trick play one needs to maximize the total value of the cards won in tricks, rather than the number of tricks won. But in Cinch (and already in Pedro) the original card-points were abolished in favor of directly assigning game points to the cards. As a result of this process, only six of the fourteen trumps carry card-values, while the plain suit cards do not score at all.

The first dealer is decided by cutting. The highest bidder declares trumps. After card play (assuming that the party of the highest bidder kept their contract), the party that captured more card-points in tricks scores the difference towards the set total that wins game.

The dealer shuffles the pack, and the player to the dealer's right cuts. Nine cards are dealt to each player, in batches of three.

Beginning with the eldest hand, each player gets one chance to bid for the privilege of declaring the trump suit. A bid is the number of points that the bidder's party undertakes to win in the deal, the minimum bid being 1. Each player must make a higher bid than any previous player, or pass. The highest possible bid is 14.

When the highest bidder has announced the trump suit, starting with eldest hand each player in turn discards at least three cards face up. The dealer fills each player's hand up to six cards. In the four-player partnership version the dealer's own hand is filled up by robbing the pack: The dealer chooses the cards freely from the remaining stock, and if any trumps remain in the stock discards them openly.

Any scoring trumps discarded by the opponents are counted for the highest bidder's party.

The highest bidder leads to the first trick and need not lead a trump. The standard rules for card play in trick-taking games hold, with one exception: It is always allowed to trump instead of following suit. ("Follow suit or trump.") As usual, the highest card of the suit led wins each trick, unless a trump is played, in which case the highest trump played wins. The winner of a trick leads to the next trick.

Both parties count the card-points in their tricks. If the bidding party keeps the contract, i.e. wins the required number of card-points, the party that won more card-points scores the difference. Otherwise the opponents score their own result plus the value of the bid.
