= 63rd Street =

63rd Street may refer to:

- 63rd Street station (disambiguation), stations of the name
- 63rd Street (Manhattan), New York City
- 63rd Street (Washington, D.C.)

63rd street [6300S] in Chicago, Illinois

== See also ==
- 63rd Street Lines
- 63rd Street Shuttle
- 63rd Street Tunnel
