= All fours (card game) =

English card game

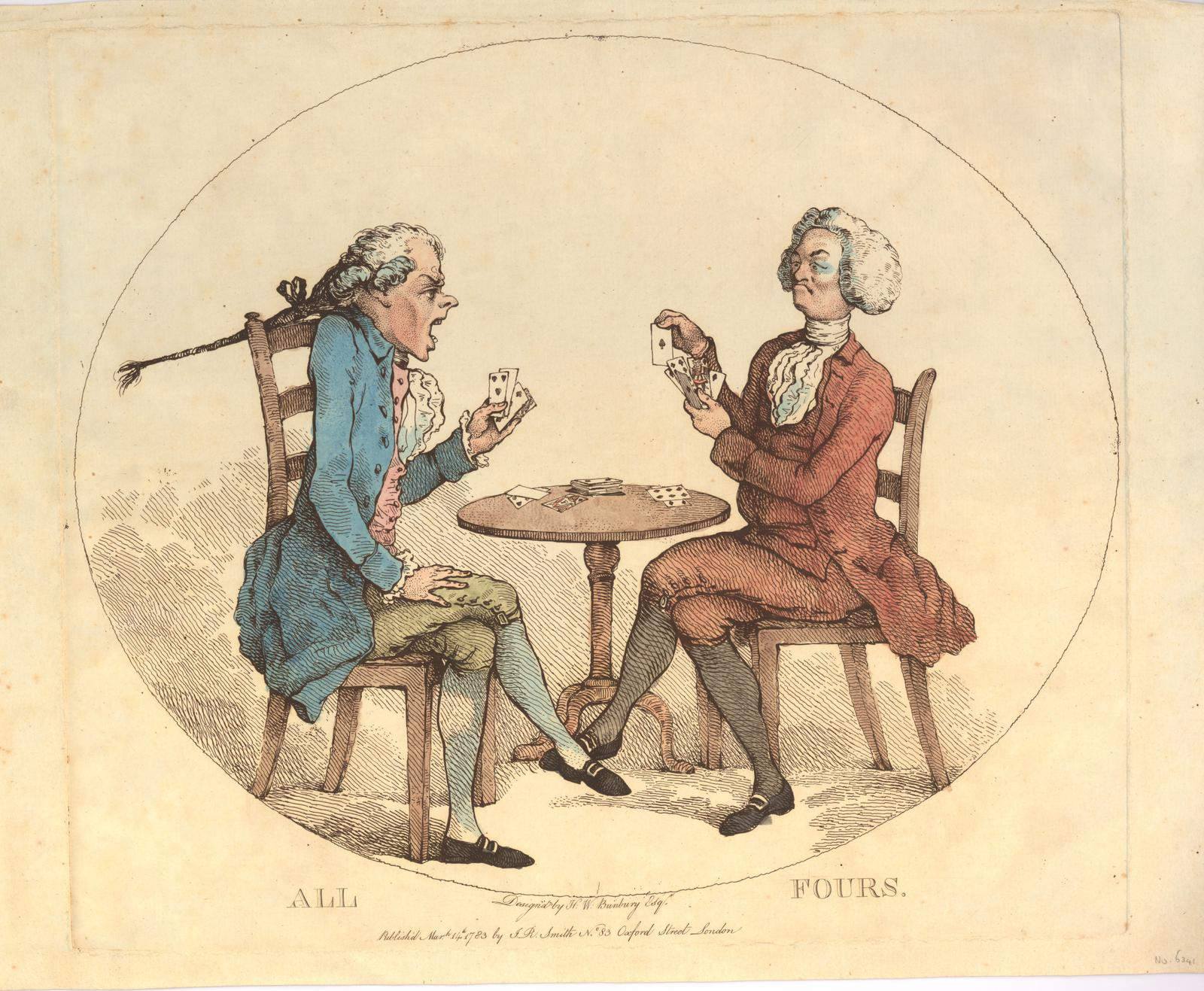
- All fours, depicted in 1783
- Origin: England
- Alternative names: High-low-jack, old sledge, seven up
- Type: Trick-taking
- Family: All fours
- Players: 2 or more
- Skills: Memory, attention
- Cards: 52 cards
- Deck: English pattern
- Rank (high→low): A K Q J 10 9 8 7 6 5 4 3 2
- Play: Clockwise (US, England) or anticlockwise (Trinidad and Tobago)
- Playing time: 15 minutes approximately
- Chance: Moderate

Related games
- Pitch • Auction Pitch • Cinch • Pedro • Phat
- Remarks: 6 cards dealt; players may either follow or trump; points for high, low, jack and game.

All fours is a traditional English card game, once popular in pubs and taverns as well as among the gentry, that flourished as a gambling game until the end of the 19th century. It is a trick-taking card game that was originally designed for two players, but developed variants for more players. According to Charles Cotton, the game originated in Kent, but spread to the whole of England and eventually abroad. It is the eponymous and earliest recorded game of a family that flourished most in 19th century North America and whose progeny include pitch, pedro and cinch, games that even competed with poker and euchre. Nowadays the original game is especially popular in Trinidad and Tobago, but regional variants have also survived in England. The game's "great mark of distinction" is that it gave the name 'jack' to the card previously known as the knave.

The game has a number of unusual features. In trick play, players are allowed to trump instead of following suit even if they could. The title refers to the possibility of winning all four game points for high, low, jack and game for holding (later winning) the highest and lowest trump in play and the jack of trumps and for winning the greatest number of card points.

== History ==
All fours is among the oldest extant card games in England. Its first known description was in Charles Cotton's Compleat Gamester of 1674, where the game was reported as popular in Kent. It is probably of Dutch ancestry, and is the game that gave the name jack to the card that was originally known only as the knave.

By no later than the 1800s, the game was taken to America and became popular among African Americans on slave plantations. (Note: It is briefly mentioned in an 1810 biography, being played in a gaming house alongside Euchre, Loo, Cribbage, and Whist.) Also called seven up, it gave rise to other variants such as Pitch and Auction Pitch, which probably developed in the New England states, Pedro, and California jack, also known as high-low-jack. Modern descendants include don and phat, developed in Britain and Ireland. The game is still played in north-west England and Wales, and it has become the national game of the Republic of Trinidad and Tobago.

== Classic all fours (earliest rules) ==
The earliest known rules for all fours appear in the 1674 edition of The Compleat Gamester by Charles Cotton. Cotton tells us that "All-Fours is a Game very much play'd in Kent, and very well it may since from thence it drew its first original; and although the game may be lookt upon as trivial and inconsiderable, yet I have known Kentish Gentlemen and others of very considerable note, who have play'd great sums of money at it..." His rules, which are not complete, are as follows.

The game was called all fours from its four point-earning feats: highest, lowest, jack and game. It was a game for two players. The players 'lifted' (i.e. cut) for the deal and the player with the highest put-card won. This presumably meant the highest using the ranking in put i.e. 3-2-A-K-Q-J-10-9-8-7-6-5-4. However, in the rest of the game the cards rank in their natural order (aces high).

The dealer dealt three cards each, beginning with elder hand, and then three more each so that both players had six cards, before turning the next for trump. If the turn-up was a jack, the dealer scored 1 point. If elder did not like his hand, he could 'beg'; if the dealer accepted, elder scored 1 point and threw his cards in; if the dealer refused, he dealt three more cards each and turned another for trump. If the latter was of the same suit, the exercise was repeated. (Note: It is unclear how the point for jack is treated if the trump suit is changed; whether a point is scored for each jack turned or just for the first or the final one. It is also unclear if the additional cards are dealt face down and then discarded if the trump suit is repeated.)

The scoring card values for game are ace 4, king 3, queen 2, jack 1, and ten 10. Play is not described in detail, except that it seems players had to follow suit, but could renege on doing so if they had a trump. According to McLeod, elder led to the first trick and players had to follow suit or trump, but could not discard unless they could not follow. The higher trump won or, if none were played, the higher card of the led suit. The trick winner led to the next. (Note: The mechanics of play are not described, but these are the normal rules of all fours.)

Players scored a point for highest: holding the highest trump; lowest: holding the lowest trump at the start; jack: winning the trick containing the trump jack; and game: winning the most card points in tricks based on the values described above. Game was usually 11, although Cotton says that players may play to a total of anything from 7 to 15 points.

Cotton describes a variation called running all-fours played to a score of 31 points and in which the dealer scored the value of the trump turn-up e.g. 3 points for turning a king.

== Classic all fours (modern rules) ==
Card point value
Rank	A	K	Q	J	10	9	8	7	6	5	4	3	2
Value	4	3	2	1	10	0							

Scoring points
Name	Description	Points	Receiver
High	highest trump out	1	original owner = eventual owner
Low	lowest trump out	1	original owner
Jack	Jack of trumps	1	eventual owner
Game	most card points in tricks	1	eventual owner

The following rules for classic all fours are based on Arnold (2010), supplemented where stated by Parlett (2008):

The aim is to be the first player to 7, points being awarded for gift, high, low, jack and game. A standard, 52-card, English pattern pack is used with cards ranking in their natural order (aces high). The card values are as shown in the table (right).

Players draw cards for the role of first dealer; the player drawing the higher card wins. Thereafter the deal alternates. The dealer shuffles and elder hand cuts. The dealer deals six cards each in two packets of three, beginning with elder hand, and turns the next card for trump. If it is a jack, he scores 1 point for jack. After examining their hands, elder may accept the trump suit by saying "I stand" or reject it by saying "I beg". If the dealer agrees, he says "take one" and concedes 1 point for Gift to elder hand and play begins. Alternative the dealer may say "I refuse the gift" or "I run the cards", in which case the turn-up is turned down and the cards are 'run'.

If the first turn-up is rejected, it is discarded, face down, and each player receives 3 more cards, face down, and the next is turned for trump. If its suit is different from the first turn-up it is automatically entrumped. If it is the same suit again, the new turn-up and extra downcards are discard without being viewed and the cards are run again. This continues until a trump suit is established. If the new trump upcard is a jack, the dealer scores 1 for jack. If the cards run out, they are throw in and redealt.

If the cards were run, once trumps are decided, each player picks up the three additional cards and discards three in their place, reducing his hand to six cards. Elder then leads to the first trick. As before, players may either follow suit or trump, but may only renege if they cannot follow. The trick is taken by the higher trump or by the higher card of the led suit if no trumps are played. The trick winner leads to the next trick.

In addition to any points scored during the deal for gift or turning the jack, players score one point for each of the following: high: winning the highest trump in play; low: winning the lowest trump in play; jack: winning the trump jack if in play; and game for scoring the most card points in tricks. In game, if the two players tie, elder hand wins. Points made during the deal are scored immediately and may result in the player 'counting out' (winning with 7 points) without the need for any further play. Otherwise, players score at the end of the deal in the order: high, low, jack and game.

== Three or more players ==
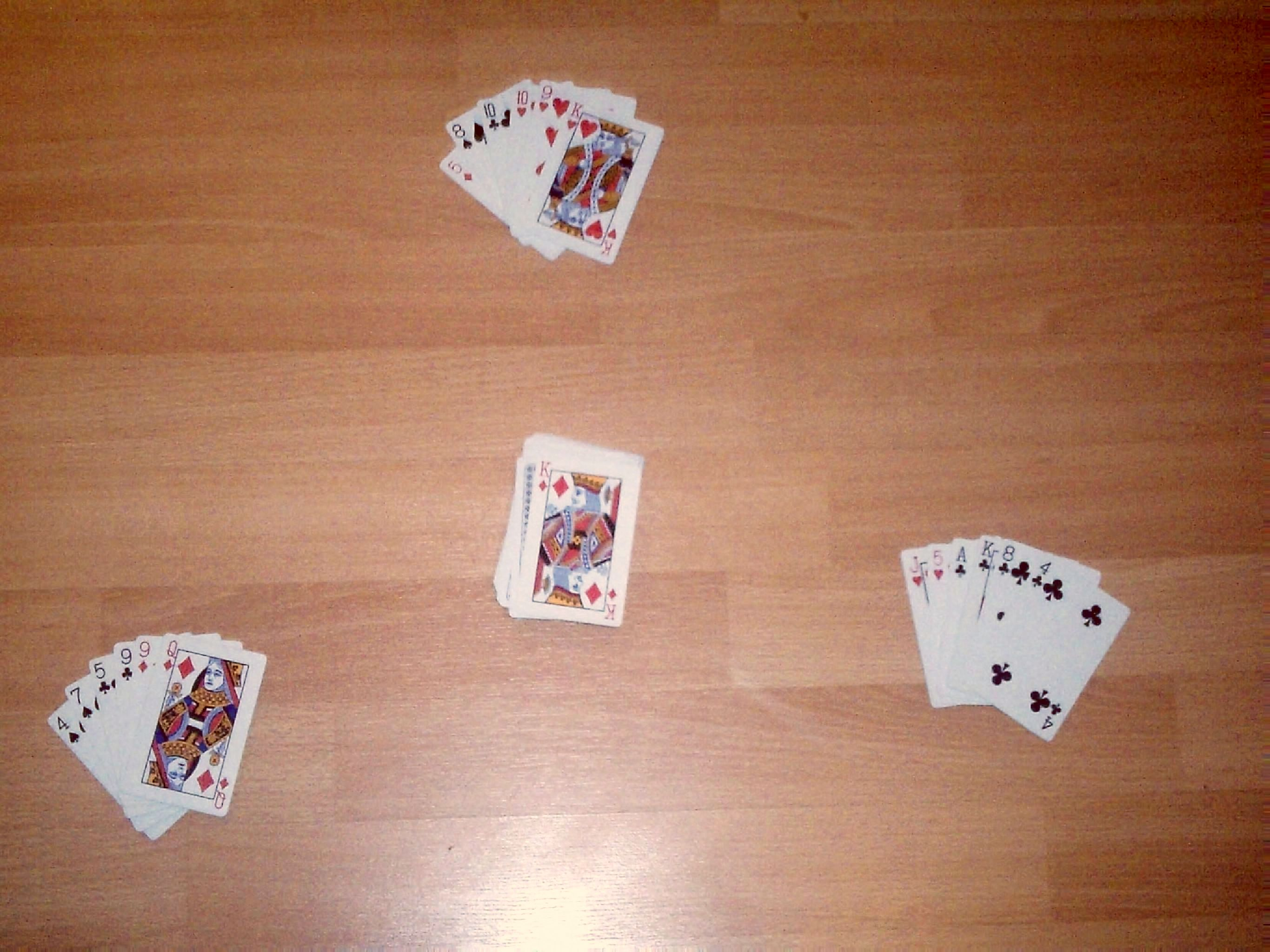
Setup for a three player game

Although all fours is basically a two-player game, it is also good for three or four and can be played by even more. Four can play individually or in two fixed partnerships, sitting crosswise. The following rules have been formulated for any number of players.

After dealing the dealer turns the next card on the stock face up to determine the trump suit. Instead of immediately leading to the first trick, eldest hand has the option of begging, to which the dealer responds either by granting each opposing party 1 point, or by running the cards. (Note: To avoid a flow of information, only the dealer and eldest hand may look at their cards until eldest hand has decided whether to beg or not.) To run the cards, the dealer deals three more cards to each player and turns up a new card for trump. Should the new card be of the same suit as the previous one, the dealer again deals three cards to each player and turns up a new card. This is repeated as often as necessary. (Note: If the stock is used up before this process is finished, the deal is abandoned and the same dealer deals again. The dealer can keep any point already scored for turning up a jack (see below).) If the cards were run, the respective number of tricks is played. (Note: It is also common to discard down to six cards in this case, but this often comes with complex rules about what may or may not be discarded.) If the dealer turns up a jack that determines trumps, the dealer is immediately awarded 1 point for jack. (Note: This can happen twice if dealer turns up a jack initially, eldest hand begs, and dealer turns up another jack. However, if dealer initially turns up a non-Jack, and then turns up the jack of the same suit while running the cards (so that the process has to be repeated), the dealer does not score for the jack.) In a game with two parties, a maximum of 6 points can accrue in one deal if the dealer turns up a jack and runs the cards.

== Variants ==
There was little variation between Charles Cotton's 1674 rules and the rules in early 20th century English and American rule books. Today, in addition to the classical game that is still widely published, there are four main variants of all fours. In England, the game is thriving in the counties of Lancashire and West Yorkshire where all fours leagues exist, however the rules in the two counties are slightly different. The game is also popular in the Caribbean, especially in Trinidad where it has become their national game. In America, it has largely been superseded by other members of the family, especially Pitch, but all fours also exists in a form known as Seven Up, the American name for all fours played to a target score of 7 points. Detailed rules for the following variants are given at pagat.com.

=== Caribbean all fours ===
All fours is the national card game of Trinidad and Tobago, where it is typically played as a four-player partnership game with the following variations to the standard rules.

Deal and play are anticlockwise and game is 14 points. Instead of scoring 1 for turning the jack, the dealer scores 1 point for turning up the Ace, 2 points for the Six (in Trinidad) or Two (in Tobago) and 3 points for the jack. If running the cards as a result of the opposing team begging, the dealer scores each time such a card is turned up, even if it does not make trumps. If the jack was captured in a trick won by the party that did not originally hold it, the party scores 3 points for Hang jack instead of 1 point for jack. Players may lead any card, but the rules for following are subtly different. If a trump is led, players must play a trump if possible; otherwise may discard. If a card of a side suit is led, players must either follow suit or trump. If they cannot follow, they need not trump however.

=== Yorkshire all fours ===
In Yorkshire, all fours is still a popular pub and league game for four players in two teams of two. The gist of the rules is as follows:

A standard pack is used; aces are high. Deal and player are clockwise. Players receive cards to decide first dealer; the player with the first jack becomes the pitcher (as eldest hand) and the player to his right, the dealer. Players receive six cards in three rounds of variable number as the dealer chooses.

There is no begging and trumps are revealed by the pitcher leading or 'pitching' any card, its suit becoming trumps for the deal. To the lead of a trump, players must play a trump if able; to the lead of a plain suit card, players must either follow suit or trump unless they cannot follow suit, in which case they may discard. A player with no trumps or counting cards left and who is losing the current trick, may throw in his hand, face up, leaving his partner to continue alone.

At the end of the deal, teams score for High, Low, jack and Game as usual. Low goes to the team dealt the lowest trump. In the event of a tie for Game, the point is not scored. Points are pegged on a wooden board and game is 11 points.

=== Lancashire all fours ===
The Lancashire variant differs from its Yorkshire counterpart as follows:

Cards are cut for first pitch. The first player cuts and an opponent must guess the colour of the suit; if right, his team chooses the first pitcher; if wrong, the cutting team choose the pitcher. Low goes to the team that captures the lowest trump. There are a number of other procedural points that may differ from the Yorkshire variant, but the detail is not known.

== Related games ==
All fours has spawned a whole family of games, several of which have been highly successful, especially in America, Ireland and Wales. One variant, pidro, has even been found in Finland, although games of the all fours genre have otherwise hardly penetrated Europe.

=== Pitch ===
Pitch is a North American descendant of all fours. Two or more players play individually or in equal-sized teams, seated alternatingly. Default play rotation is clockwise in most areas. Players cut for first deal. Cards rank as in Whist and have certain numerical card point values as shown in the table. In each deal up to 4 scoring points are distributed among the parties. The game is won by the party that first reaches the previously specified target score over several deals.

The dealer shuffles and the player sitting before him in rotation, cuts. The dealer hands out 6 cards to each player in batches of 3. Trump is determined by the suit of the first card played in trick-play. Eldest hand leads to the first trick, and the winner of each trick leads to the next. Standard trick-play rules are in effect with the exception that a player who can follow suit to a plain suit lead is nevertheless allowed to play a trump.

At the end of the round scoring points are awarded as described in the table. The jack point is not awarded if no player held the jack of trumps. The Game point is only awarded if one party has won more card points in tricks than any other. The scoring points accrue strictly in the order given in the table, preventing ties in case more than one team reaches the target score at the end of the deal.

The pub game played nowadays in northern England under the name all nours is a four-player partnership version of pitch, played with 4 hands of cards. The lead card in each hand becomes trumps and all game points are counted after each hand has been played. If the game is tied, a further 2 hands, a 'pitch apiece' are played until a winner is decided. The point for low is awarded to the eventual owner.

Choosing the trump suit by leading to the first trick is known as pitching. That trump is determined by pitching rather than by turning up a card from the stock is the key difference between Pitch and classic all fours/seven up.

=== Auction pitch ===
Around the middle of the 19th century among American players an innovation spread, allowing the eldest hand to "sell the trump", i.e. auction the privilege to pitch. This early form of auction pitch is now known as commercial pitch.

In commercial pitch the players in turn get a chance to bid 1–4 points for the privilege of pitching, or pass. Each bid must be higher than the previous one. Eldest hand immediately scores the amount of the bid. A highest bidder who does not win at least as many points as bid is set back the amount of the bid. Eldest hand may refuse to sell the right to pitch to the highest bidder, in which case eldest hand must win at least as many points or is set back.

In modern auction pitch the right to pitch is bought from the bank rather than from eldest hand. Starting with eldest hand each player bids for the privilege of pitching or passes exactly once. The highest bidder determines trumps by leading to the first trick. After the last trick all parties score their points as in all fours. However, if the pitcher's party has not won as many points as bid, then the pitchers party does not score at all and is instead set back by the amount of the bid.

=== All fives ===
In this scoring variant of blind all fours, in addition to the usual features the winner of a trick immediately scores the card points of any trumps it contains. Moreover, winning a trick that contains the Five of trumps immediately scores 5 points. The game is played for 61 points, ideally scored on a cribbage board. For determining the winner of the Game point, The Five of trumps is also worth 5 points. All other trumps and non-trumps have their usual card values.

=== California jack ===
This trick-and-draw variant was also known as French fours, French loo or Spanish all fours. Trumps is determined randomly before the deal. Each player receives only 3 cards. The remaining pack is used face up for drawing after each trick. Placing it face up ensures that revokes can be noticed. The point for low goes to the player who wins the lowest trump in a trick. If the stock is kept face down as usual this variant is known as Shasta Sam.

== Literature ==
- Cotton, Charles (1674). The Compleat Gamester; Or, Instructions how to Play at Billiards, Trucks, Bowls and Chess ... Cards ... Dice, To which is Added the Arts ... of Riding, Racing, Archery, and Cockfighting [by Charles Cotton]. Henry Brome.
- Arnold, Peter (2010). The complete book of card games. London: Hamlyn. ISBN 978-0600621911.
- McLeod, John (ed.), "All Fours Group", Card Games website.
- Parlett, David (1990), "All Fours", The Oxford guide to card games: a historical survey, Oxford University Press, pp. 257–261, ISBN 978-0-19-214165-1.
- Parlett, David (2004), The A–Z of card games (2nd ed.), Oxford University Press, ISBN 978-0-19-860870-7.
- Parlett, David (2008), "High-low-Jack family", The Penguin Book of Card Games (3rd ed.), Penguin Books, pp. 175–188, ISBN 978-0-14-103787-5.
- Piomingo (1810). The Savage. Philadelphia: Thomas S. Manning
