= Pitch (card game) =

American card game

Setback
- Origin: United Kingdom
- Alternative names: Pitch, setback, auction pitch, bid pitch, high low jack smear
- Type: Trick-taking
- Players: 2–9
- Cards: 54
- Deck: French
- Rank (high→low): A K Q J JOKER 10 9 8 7 6 5 4 3 2
- Play: Clockwise

Related games
- All fours • Pedro • Cinch • Phat

Pitch (or "high low jack") is an American trick-taking game equivalent to the British blind all fours which, in turn, is derived from the classic all fours (US: seven up). Historically, pitch started as "blind all fours", a very simple all fours variant that is still played in England as a pub game. The modern game involving a bidding phase and setting back a party's score if the bid is not reached came up in the middle of the 19th century and is more precisely known as auction pitch or setback.

Whereas all fours began as a two-player game, pitch is most popular for three to five players. Four can play individually or in fixed partnerships, depending in part on regional preferences. Auction pitch is played in numerous variations that vary the deck used, provide methods for improving players hands, or expand the scoring system. Some of these variants gave rise to new games such as Pedro, Pedro Sancho, Dom Pedro or Cinch.

== Pitch or blind all fours ==
Pips
Rank	A	K	Q	J	10	9	8	7	6	5	4	3	2
Value	4	3	2	1	10	0							

Scoring points
Name	Description	Points	Receiver
High	highest trump out	1	original owner = eventual owner
Low	lowest trump out	1	original owner
Jack	jack of trumps	1	eventual owner
Game	most pips in tricks	1	eventual owner

Two or more players play individually or in equal-sized teams, seated alternatingly. Normal play rotation is clockwise. Players cut for first deal. Cards rank as in whist and have certain numerical values called pips as shown in the table. In each deal up to 4 scoring points are distributed among the parties. The game is won by the party that first reaches a previously specified target score over several deals.

The dealer shuffles and the pone cuts. The dealer hands out 6 cards to each player in batches of 3. Trump is determined by the suit of the first card played in trick-play. Eldest hand leads to the first trick, and the winner of each trick leads to the next. Standard trick-play rules are in effect with the exception that a player who can follow suit to a plain suit lead is nonetheless allowed to play a trump.

At the end of the deal, scoring points, also referred to as pointy points in some circles, are awarded as described in the table. The Jack point is not awarded if no player held the Jack of trumps. The Game point is only awarded if one party has won more pips in tricks than any other. The scoring points accrue strictly in the order given in the table, preventing ties in case more than one team reaches the target score at the end of the deal.

The pub game played nowadays in northern England under the name all fours is a four-player partnership version of pitch, played for 11 points. Side payments are made for winning all four points in a single hand. In some areas the point for low is awarded to the eventual owner.

Choosing the trump suit by leading to the first trick is known as pitching. That trump is determined by pitching rather than by turning up a card from the stock is the key difference between pitch and classical all fours/seven up.

== Auction pitch ==
Auction pitch is played in exactly the same way as simple pitch, except that instead of eldest hand the highest bidder pitches, and the highest bidder must reach the number of scoring points bid or is set back.

Beginning with eldest hand, each player gets one chance to bid for the privilege of declaring the trump suit. A bid is the number of points that the bidder undertakes to win in the deal, the minimum bid being 1. Each player must make a higher bid than the previous player, or pass. A bid of four (the highest possible) is known as shoot the moon, slam or smudge. If no player bids, the deal is abandoned and the same dealer deals again. The player who wins the bid, known as the pitcher or maker, must win as many points as he or she bid. The pitcher pitches, i.e. leads to the first trick and thereby establishes the trump suit (as the suit of the card led).

A player who can follow suit but discards a card of a different non-trump suit is punished for the revoke by being set back by the value of the bid.

Players may receive points even if they did not win the auction. A pitcher who did not win at least the number of points undertaken with the bid does not receive any of the points, and is instead set back by the amount of the bid. Negative scores are possible.

It may happen that at the end of a deal more than one player reaches the number of points necessary to win the game. In this case the order in which the points are rewarded becomes crucial: Any points won by the pitcher are counted first. Thereafter the remaining points are awarded in the order as listed above, i.e. first High, then Low, then Jack, then Game.

Scores can be kept on paper, in which case negative numbers may be marked by circles. (A player with a negative score is said to be "in the hole".) Alternatively, each player may begin with as many counters as are needed to win the game, and get rid of one for each point won.

All fours and its variants have always been used as gambling games, and according to John McLeod, cutthroat pitch is probably still popular for this purpose at the American coasts. If the game is played with a pool, each player initially pays a fixed amount into the pool. A player who is set back for failing to win as many points as bid for, or for a revoke, also has to pay the same amount into the pool. The winner of the game receives the contents of the pool.

=== Common minor variations ===
- "No junk points" - only the bidding player/team can score points in each round. If he fails to make his bid he is setback, but no points are awarded to the other players/team.
- Some of the lower cards may be removed from the deck. The two-player game is more interesting if the Threes, Fours and Fives are removed. Removing the Threes ensures that in the eight-player game all cards are dealt.
- The game is often played for a number of points other than 11, for example 7, 9, 15 or 21. The best number depends on the number of players and on how many points are typically won in a deal. Sometimes the following formula is used to determine the number of points required to win: (points available) * (number of players) + 1.
- The minimum bid may be two, rather than one.
- The dealer, being the last to bid, may have the privilege of stealing the bid by bidding the same as the highest bid. Under this variation the dealer is obliged to make at least the minimum bid if all other players have passed.
- The point for low is often awarded to the player who won the trick containing the lowest trump, rather than the original owner of the lowest trump.
- A pitcher who made and wins the maximum bid is said to smudge, slam or shoot the moon. Such a player, if not "in the hole" (i.e. if the player does not have a negative score), automatically wins the entire game.
- Two jokers are included in the deck, raising the possible take in a round to 6 points. Jokers are considered trump, ranking just below the jack, and are not allowed to be led in the first trick of a round. The eventual owner of the joker is the one to earn the point for it, not the original owner. Jokers are worth half a pip.

== Partnership pitch ==
Most forms of the game have a partnership variant for four players in two teams, sitting crosswise. (Three teams of two players or two teams of three players can play by the same principle.) Scoring works as in basic pitch, but by team. It is sufficient for the pitcher's team to score the number of points indicated by the bid. The partnership game is typically played for a higher number of points, e.g. 21 points.

Winning all four points is much easier in the four-player partnership version than in other versions. Therefore, one common variation is that shooting the moon is a separate bid worth 5 points and involves winning all six tricks in addition to winning all four points. The fifth point for winning all six tricks is only awarded if the pitching team undertook to shoot the moon.

Another variation common in partnership pitch is that only the pitching party can win the game.

== Off-jack, jokers and odd trumps ==
In some variants a joker is added to the pack as an additional trump ranked below the two of trumps. For the determination of the low point it is ignored, but its owner or winner is awarded an additional joker point.

A joker may also be added to the pack as the ultimate trump, capturing everything but the low trump. It also represents a point.

In euchre, the non-trump jack of the same color (not suit) as trumps is called the left bower. It belongs logically to the trump suit and ranks immediately below the jack of trumps (right bower). Some variants of pitch borrow this feature, in which case the left bower is referred to as the off-jack or jick. If this feature is used, an additional point for off-jack can be scored in analogy to the point for jack.

A joker can be used for the same purpose, i.e. ranking between the jack of trumps and the ten of trumps. Combining the last two ideas, one can rank the joker between the off-jack and the ten of trumps. Finally, one can play with the off-jack and more than one joker, see smear for details.

Some variants have odd trumps. For example, the five of trumps might be worth 5 points ("Chicago pitch") or the three of trumps 3 points. In analogy to the off-jack there may also be other off-trumps which are logically trumps and rank immediately below their trump counterparts. For example, the off-three might be worth 3 points while the three of trumps retains its usual worth of 0 points.

== Scoring variations ==
Most variation in Pitch centers around a multitude of scoring systems. While many different points are possible in pitch, no variant offers the ability to earn every type of point. Instead, most variants use a selection of the points listed below.

Name	Description	Points	Receiver
High	highest trump in play	1	original owner = eventual owner
Low	lowest trump in play	1	original owner
Jack	jack of trumps	1	eventual owner
Off-Jack	jack of same color as trumps	1	eventual owner
Joker 1	first joker played / higher joker	1	eventual owner
Joker 2	second joker played / lower joker	1	eventual owner
Last trick	winning the last trick	1	—
Game	most card-points	1	eventual owner
Trey	Three of trumps	3	eventual owner
Old Nate	Four of spades if trumps	1	eventual owner

== Miscellaneous options ==
- Bid to go out: Also called bidder goes out, in this variant a player can only win the game if they reach the goal on a hand for which they made the winning bid. In some variants, a team can win if they reach the goal during a hand in which they set the bidder.
- The smudge bid: Some variations allow a special bid. If a player or team believes they can make every possible point, they may bid "smudge." In basic pitch, a smudge bid is a 5-point bid. In some variants, making smudge grants additional points. To make a smudge bid, a player or team must make all possible points and win every trick and capture the Jack of trumps. The bid must be made before the hand is played or the extra point is not awarded.
- Call for partner: Many varieties of pitch incorporate this rule. There are no set teams; instead, the player who wins the bid calls for a specific card, and the player who has it becomes their partner until the next bid. The "called" card is the first played, and sets the trump. Points are kept individually, though they are earned as a team.
- The Scranton rule: In this variant, when a player's hand contains exclusively cards below ten, the player may choose to enter a bid of "coke." Distinct from "coke hands", the player who declares coke is then dealt a fresh five card hand, must show his six cards to all players, cannot bid further, and refrains from playing the final trick of the round. The origin is disputed, but is likely derived from the use of coke (fuel), as is common in the coal-bearing regions in and surrounding Northeastern Pennsylvania, and refers to the "burning" of the sixth card. In a New York variation, the player refrains from playing the first trick of the round rather than refraining from playing the final trick.
- The force bid: Many variations require that the dealer make the minimum bid if no other bids have been made. When this rule is not used, the hand is re-dealt when all players pass.
- Shoot the moon: A player may shoot the moon, bidding the maximum number. If the player or team makes the bid, they win the game; if they are set, they lose the game.
- Mucking a hand: A player with cards that are not trump cards between 2 and 9 may drop the hand at any time if the player feels that they can not win any tricks with said cards. If the player in this situation is the dealer, the dealer just takes a negative score for that round. When playing partnership pitch, mucking your hand is not allowed as it can give the partner of the mucked hand a slight advantage.
- Misdeal: If a player's initial hand contains only non-point, non-face cards (typically, four through nine only), they can reveal their hand and force the dealer to reshuffle and re-deal all cards.
- Blind pitch: In this variation, each player is dealt a "blind" of three cards in addition to their hand. Players may not look at the cards in their blind. Cards are typically removed from the deck to ensure that all points are in play. During play, a player must follow suit, trump in, or play the top card of their blind. Only if none of these options are available may they play an off-suit card from their hand.
- Coke hands: Similar to mucking a hand, in this variation a player with cards not trump between 3 and 9 may call coke hand, turn in their cards and are dealt a new hand. The cards that are turned in may not be exposed until after all rounds are complete. A player that calls for a coke hand cannot bid. Since there might not be enough cards in the deck to support multiple coke hands, typically priority goes to the first player who calls, so the player in the "soft hole" (the first player dealt all their cards with the first chance to bid) has the advantage to call first.

== Card distribution variations ==
=== Players start with six cards ===
Various variations deal with ways of improving players' hands. Some address the case that one player has exceptionally poor cards:

- Players who have received no point cards (that is, no cards which could contribute toward the Game point) may lay their cards face down and receive a new hand. The cards can be checked by the other players after the hand has been played. A player who has made use of this option may not bid unless forced to do so (i.e., if the player is the dealer).
- A player who has received no point cards may ask for a complete re-deal by the same dealer.

In some variations, the highest bidder does not pitch immediately, but first announces the trump suit, after which all players get a chance to discard a number of cards. Their hands are afterwards completed to six cards by the dealer. Each player

- discards all non-trumps, or
- discards as many non-trumps as desired.

In some variations a widow (extra hand) is dealt along with the players' hands. Before deciding the trump suit, the maker adds the widow to their hand and brings the number of cards back down to six by discarding.

=== Players start with more than six cards ===
The players may initially be dealt more than six card (typically nine). After the highest bidder has announced the trump suit, each player

- discards all non-trumps and as many trumps as necessary to get down to six cards, or
- discards at least three non-trumps, or exactly three cards including all non-trumps,

after which the dealer completes each hand to six cards. In some variations the highest bidder has the privilege of completing their hand by searching the remaining stock after all other players have received their cards.

As a simpler alternative, each player brings their hand down to six by discarding the appropriate number of cards. The discarded cards must all be non-trumps or include all of the player's non-trumps.

== Strategy ==
A player should try to determine what points his hand will allow the player to win and bid accordingly. The rule of thumb is to add one point to a bid when you have a partner.

Typical strategy is to "draw out" valuable cards from other players. Since pitch rules require that players follow suit, it is possible to force the play of Jacks and Jokers, allowing their capture. If the bid-winning player cannot be sure he or she has the highest trump, lower trumps may initially be led to draw them out; the hope is that by the second or third trick only Jacks and Jokers will remain in other players' hands - they can then be captured.

If the player to your left has a strong hand that is easy to read, you may bid with a weak hand in an attempt to overbid them.

In all varieties of pitch, the goal is to set the player or team who wins the bid. In practice, this might mean giving an opponent a point card just to deny it to the bidder. This also means "sloughing game" (cards with a point value) to a single player so that the bidder will not win the game point.

== Named variants ==
=== Pitch games based on breaking trump ===
==== Barn pitch ====
Barn pitch is the most common variant of pitch that requires trump to be "broken" before any trump can be played. Instead of leading with trump, the highest bidder must instead lead with a different suit. Trump is then only allowed to be played if a player cannot follow the led suit, once the first trump of the round is played then trump is broken. Once trump has been broken, or it is the only suit remaining in a players hand, it can be led. Gameplay and scoring after the trump is broken proceed exactly as it is in classic Pitch.

=== Pitch games based on six points ===
==== Abacos pitch ====
Abacos pitch is a pitch variant that is gaining popularity in the mid-Atlantic and northeast United States. It varies from classic Pitch as follows: In the bidding round, each player may choose to look or not look at his/her hand before making a decision. At the end of the bidding round, each player who looked at his/her cards before acting loses one card, chosen at random. Players who lose a card have nothing to play in the sixth and final round of play. Play and scoring after the bidding round proceed exactly as in classic Pitch.

==== Man-o-war pitch ====
Man-o-war pitch is another variant of classic pitch. It is similar to Abacos pitch except after the bidding round, the player who made the highest bid looks at the cards given up by players who looked at their hand prior to bidding, one at a time. The player with the highest bid may choose to take or not take each card he looks at. If he chooses to take a card, he discards a card of his choice. This variant provides a significant advantage to the player with the highest bid and therefore promotes aggressive bidding.

==== Contway 6-point ====
===== Overview =====
Contway 6-point pitch is based on auction pitch and combines a number of variations, some of which are unique. The deck is played with a regular 52-card deck plus one joker. The six points consist of high, low, jack, off-jack, joker, and game. Trump suit includes the off-jack and joker and is ordered ace, king, queen, jack, off-jack, joker, 10,9,8,...2.

===== Partners =====
Four people play in teams of two with partners sitting across from each other. If multiple games are played, partners rotate so all possibilities for partners are fulfilled. Partnering in large groups or multiple tables is done casually using the best guess of the group for the proper partnerships. Overall wins are not partner based, but individual and the person with the most wins after all play has ended is considered the winner. Three people can play with the same rules but there are no teams.

===== The deal =====
Each player is dealt six cards in two rounds of three cards starting left of the dealer. The player to the left of the dealer is the first to bid, and continues clockwise. Each player has the option to either pass or outbid the previous bid. The minimum bid is 2, and if all players pass, the dealer is given the minimum bid and becomes the winning bidder.

After every player has bid, the winning bidder then announces the trump suit. Starting left of the dealer, each player has a chance to throw away any cards, including trump, and is dealt to a total of six cards. If all six cards are thrown, it is called being "pitched". The unused and discarded cards are then placed to the left of the dealer to denote the next dealer and the deal moves clockwise around the table.

===== Play =====
The first card is played by the winning bidder and must be trump. Players must always follow suit, but trump can be played at any time.

Cards are discarded face up into one pile for each team. Either pile can be examined by any player at any time. This helps the forgetful but also provides a way to actively tally for Game, the sixth point.

The bidder and only the bidder has the option to fold the game at any time even before the first hand is played and is equivalent to not making the bid. If cards are in play, the hand must be completed before stopping. Points for High, Low, Jack, Off-Jack and Joker are awarded to the non-bidding team only if the cards have been successfully played before the game was folded. However, the High and Low points must be the Ace and the 2 even if revealing all cards shows other cards would have won High or Low. Game point is not counted.

Unique to Contway 6-point pitch is the ability to toss trump cards before the redeal. Tossing point cards such as the Jack, Off-Jack, or Joker can useful if the other team bids too high, or when it is the only trump in the hand and the other team keeps many cards which decreases the chance that the redeal will provide protection. Actively watching the number of cards withheld by each player is informative.

The general strategy during the game revolves around taking the Jack, Off-Jack and Joker. Leading the highest trump allows the partner to safely give the team a point card, or will potentially force an opponent to give a point card. Since one can trump at any time, playing last in a hand provides the easiest way to win one of these cards. Game point is fought for actively during the game, and if a teammate is playing last, one will often "Alley-oop" a face card or a 10 to add to the team's Game tally.

===== Scoring =====
Once all cards are played, the two piles are examined to determine points. The High and the Low, each worth one point, are the highest and lowest trump played during the round. As some cards are never in play, the Ace and 2 of trump are not always high and low. Low is awarded to the team who played the card, not who won the card. It is therefore customary to say "2 for low" or "3 for low" when a low card is played to help recall who threw the card. The Jack, Off-Jack, and Joker, collectively called "The Jacks", are each worth one point, and counted for the team who won them.

Each team does a tally for Game point with the winner having the most points in their pile. Both face cards and 10's of any suit are counted for points according to the following point system: 10= 10 points, Ace= 4 points, King= 3 points, Queen= 2 points, Jack= 1 point. In the event of a tie, the Joker acts as the winning tie-breaker. If there is no Joker in play, no game point is awarded for the tie.

If the bidding team makes less than their bid, they are set, or "hickeyed", and subtract the bid from their overall score. A star is placed next to the current score to denote a hickey. Scores never go below zero. Play continues until a team reaches 11 points. In the event that both teams have 11 or more points, the bidding team of the final round wins even if the non-bidding team has more points.

A separate list is maintained for keeping track of overall wins and losses of each player individually. Each winning player earns +$1.00 (or +1 if playing points only) and each losing player -$1.00. If the winning team had hickeys, these are not penalized. However, if the losing team had hickeys, each losing player loses another $1.00 per hickey, and each winning player gains $1.00. In this way, the total for the entire list should always equal zero. At the end of all play, for example at the end of a week long vacation, a winner is declared and everyone is paid out.

=== Pitch games based on 10 points ===
==== Oklahoma ten-point ====
Each player is dealt six cards. Bids are usually from 1–9, and the Shoot the Moon rule is in effect. After bidding, players discard non-trumps and the dealer distributes cards so that each hand has six cards. Points available are High 'Ace' (one point), Low 'Two' (one point), Jack (one point), Off-Jack or Jick 'Jack of same color different suit' (one point), Big Joker (one point), Little Joker (one point), Three (three points), Game '10' (one point), and sometimes Off-Three (three points). King and Queen are not counted toward the game points but still take Jack, Off-Jack, both Jokers, Ten, Nine, Eight, Seven, Six, Five, Four, both Threes, and Two.

This variant allows players to bid a "straight" hand (like normal) or to double bid. For example, a player may bid a "straight 6", or "6 for 12." In the latter example, the player would score 12 points by earning six; or, failing to earn points equal to their bid, would be set 12 points.

==== Campbell ten-point ====
Played like Oklahoma ten-point with a few variations. Each player is initially dealt nine cards. Minimum bid is 5, and the Shoot the Moon rule is in effect. Players discard all non-trumps and the dealer distributes remaining undealt cards so all players have six. Points available are Ace, Jack, Off-Jack, "High" Joker, "Low" Joker, Ten, Three (worth three points), and Two (an automatic point for the player).

This variant uses the Force Bid rule. However, Mucking a Hand and Misdeal are prohibited.

Campbell ten-point pitch
- Origin: Carthage, MO
- Players: 2-6
- Cards: 54
- Play: Clockwise

===== Overview =====
The deck consists of a traditional 52-card deck with both Jokers included, making a 54-card deck.

Ace is always high and the highest playable card, but is not the most valuable. The off-jack is the non-trump jack of the same color. For instance, if the trump suit is spades, the off-jack would be the jack of clubs, jack of clubs will therefore be a spade instead of a club.

The three is among the lowest-ranked cards, but is the most valuable as it is worth three points. The two is an automatic point, as the player of the two always keeps it.

Pointers
Rank	Ace	King	Queen	Jack	Off-jack	High joker	Low joker	10	9	8	7	6	5	4	3	2
Value	1	0		1	1	1	1	1	0						3	1

Teams are chosen randomly by having each player draw a single card from a facedown deck. The two highest cards and the two lowest cards become teammates and sit crosswise from each other.

===== The deal =====
Each player is dealt nine cards. The player to the left of the dealer is the first to bid, and continues in a clockwise pattern. Each player has the option to either pass or outbid the previous bid. The minimum bid is 5, and the Shoot the Moon rule is in effect. If all players pass, the dealer is stuck with the bid.

After every player has bid, the winning bidder then announces the trump suit. Every player, other than the winning bidder, then discards any non-trumps. The dealer then re-deals to each player so that they each player has a total of six cards. The winning bidder is then granted what's left of the deck. This is known as the widow.

After the winning bidder picks out all trumps from the widow, he must narrow (or widen) his hand to six cards. If he has more than six trump cards, he must "burn" a trump. When burning a trump, the player must announce what card he is burning to the table. All non-pointer trumps must be burned before any pointers can be burned.

===== Play =====
The winning bidder is the first to play, and continues in a clockwise pattern. The first hand must be in the trump suit ("leading off" is not allowed on the first hand). If the lead player plays a trump, every player must play a trump on that particular hand. The player who plays the highest trump card takes the hand. The winner of the previous hand is the first to play the next hand.

Once a player has no more trumps in their hand, they are up (out of that game). You are not allowed to declare that you are up until it is your turn.

Other than the first hand, a player can choose to lead a non-trump. If a player leads off, all cards become playable. Once again, the highest trump card wins the hand. If no trump cards are played during an off lead, the winner of the previous hand leads the next hand, regardless of what non-trump is played.

===== Scoring =====
The objective of the hand for the team with the winning bid is to (at least) match what they bid. The objective of the team without the bid is to make their opponents "go set".

When a team with the winning bid fails to reach the amount they bid, they go set. When a team goes set, they lose whatever amount that they won the bid with. For example, if a team wins the bidding with a 6 bid and is only able to take 5 points on that hand, they lose 6 points from their total. Negative points are allowed.

In some variations, doubling of the bid is allowed as a half-point bet. For example, if one player bids 5, the next player may bid '5 for 10', effectively doubling the outcome if they're right or wrong. A bid of 6 would be larger than '5 for 10' but could be outbid by the following player with a '6 for 12'. If a player with a doubled bid goes set, they get negative points for the entire bet (-10 or -12 in these examples).

The first team to 32 points wins. If the game ends with both teams with 32 or more points, the team that won the bid on the final hand is the winner.

===== Common terms =====
Shoot the Moon
A bid of ten. (Some variations differentiate a max bid from "shoot the moon" by increasing the difficulty in some way. Others consider "shoot the moon" an all-or-nothing bid, meaning the entire game is automatically won or lost depending on whether the bidder obtains all available points.)
Re-Deal
The second round of dealings to replenish players' hands to six cards.
Widow
The remnants of the deck following the re-deal. Some variations give the entire "widow" to the bid-taker to ensure all cards are in play.
Pot
An alternative to the widow. A set number of cards (typically 4) are initially dealt to the middle of the table. The winning bidder adds the cards to his/her hand prior to declaring the trump suit.
Dead card
A playable card that must be discarded before play begins. This occurs when a player holds more than six playable cards. Discarded points typically are awarded to the player's opponents.
Four-handed game
Reaching 32 points after only four hands, the minimum number of hands possible to win a game.
Perfect game
A 40–0 win in four hands.

==== Razzle-Dazzle ====
Played like Oklahoma ten-point with a few variations. After the bid, the maker takes the deck, declares the trump, and discards down to six cards. All other players must discard non-trumps, but do not receive additional cards. This variant always incorporates the call for partner rule.

==== Wahoo ten-point ====
Played like Oklahoma ten-point with some variations. The minimum opening bid is 5. Ten-point bid is "shoot the moon". After the bids, the winning bidder declares suit. Bidder get the remaining cards in the deck but only keeps 6 cards. All other players hold their original 6 cards so other players don't know how many suit cards they have. Also the player who holds the low card '2' gets to keep that card in when the trick is played. If no one is willing to bid 5 points the dealer get a 5 bid 'dumped on them'.

==== Susqy River ten-point ====
Also known as ster-don. Seven cards are dealt to each player. Points available are high, low, jack, game, five trump, & last trick. In this variation, the low point is made by capturing the lowest trump (rather than simply playing it, as is usual). The five of trump is counted for 5 points, the other points only one each for a total of 10 possible points. After trump is declared, players must discard all non-trumps and are re-dealt to a seven card hand. First card played does not have to be trump. The forced bid rule is in effect. The game ends when one player reaches 50 points. "Win by 2" and "float (first) to 57" can both be declared before the game starts

=== Pitch games with other point variations ===
==== Campbell eleven-point ====
Played much like Campbell ten-point with the addition of the off-ace. The off-ace, like the off-jack, is not in the trump suit but is of the same color. It is worth one point and ranks just below the ace. Play ends at 51 points rather than 32. The minimum bid is 1. The misdeal rule is in effect, as is shoot the moon, which is differentiated from and superior to a perfect bid (11) in that shoot the moon automatically wins or loses the game. Only the 17 trump cards are legal for play. If a player is forced to burn a card worth points, those points are awarded to the opposing team. A five-player variation exists: here, each player has an individual, not partnership, score; partnerships change each round and are determined by the winning bidder calling for one specific trump card to be led. The player who plays this trump joins the winning bidder's partnership for that one round, and the other three players join the opposing partnership.

==== Roadhouse pitch ====
Roadhouse pitch is an auction pitch variant. Four points are awarded for high, low, jack, and game, scored for their eventual owners. Games are played to 15, with a win by two requirement. Bidding proceeds clockwise, the player left of the dealer assuming the first bid. Players wishing to bid must bid a minimum of two. In addition to bidding two, three, or four; players may also "shoot the moon", requiring them to win every trick and all four points. Shooting the moon is valued at 15 points, failure to win every trick and all four points results in a setback. Negative scoring is allowed. In the event the bid is passed to the dealer, the dealer must assume the minimum bid (or "shoot the moon"). The player with the highest bid pitches the first card, thus denoting trump. Players must follow suit regardless of trump, resulting in the primary variation from auction pitch. A player may not trump in unless they are unable to follow suit. The remaining play follows that of classic pitch.

==== Cell pitch ====
Also known as Kentucky sweven-point or heckla pitch. There are seven possible points: high, low, jack, off-jack, big joker, little joker, and game. The game is played to 21 points. Bids between 3 and 7 are allowed. The highest bidder calls trumps, and players discard non-trump cards face up in the center of the table. The dealer then distributes 6 cards to each player in batches of 1.

In Southeast Missouri this version, called 7-point pitch, is played with a 34 card deck (2s–6s removed with a 10 card blind, no discarding). Points and bids are the same as described above, and cards are dealt singly or 3 at a time.

==== Maryland jack ====
This variant allows high, low, jack, and off-jack points and was originally meant for cutthroat play. Bids are 2–4. The bid-winning player can only receive the number of points bid with one exception: If the bid-winning player earns points equal to their bid (no higher), he or she receives one extra point towards the total. Non-making players earn points only if the making player is set with one exception: the off-jack, which can be claimed by anyone. Finally, players must follow suit in this variant – trumping in is allowed only if a player has no on-suit cards. House rules may permit a game point which is calculated by using the 10s only, such that the player who takes the most 10s is awarded the game point and no player receives this point if there is a tie. Like the off-jack point, the game point can be claimed by any player.

==== High five ====
High five is a very rare Swiss variation of pitch played with two teams of two. This variant uses 9-card hands. Points used are high, low, jack, off-jack, big joker, little joker, ten, five, and off-five. Five and off-five are each worth 5 points. Bids are from 6 to 17, the shoot the moon variant is used. After bids are made, each player discards all non-trumps (or to a six-card hand). The dealer restores each hand to six cards, skipping the making player. Finally, the making player may search the deck, choosing cards to bring their hand to six.

==== Seven point ====
Seven point pitch is played the same as ten point pitch, except that the three is not counted as a point. In case of a tie in counting up game, any jokers count as a half point to break the tie. Seven point pitch is usually played in eastern Nebraska.

Seventeen point

Seventeen point pitch is played the same as ten point pitch, except that the three does not count as three points. Instead, the five and off-five each count five points.

==== Partnership draw pitch ====
This variant, also called New Yorker pitch, points available are: high, low, jack, and game. Bids 2–4 are allowed, and the forced bid and shoot the moon rules are used. After bidding, the trump is declared; next players may discard any non-trumps they choose. The dealer distributes cards so that each player has six. Play proceeds as normal, 15 points wins.

=== Nine-five variants of pitch ===
Four players play in two partnerships, sitting crosswise. In all variants of nine-five the five of trumps and the nine of trumps score many game points when captured in tricks: 5 and 9, respectively. The minimum bid is 4 or 9. The maximum number of points that can be won is 18. A minimum bid of 9 is forced if a player holds the 9 and another card of the same suit, however the high bidder may choose a trump suit other than the suit that forced their bid.

==== Nine-five ====
Nine cards are dealt to each player. A "smudge" bid is worth 19 points in this variant. A "blind smudge" bid must be made before the player looks at their hand. It is worth 20 points.

The winning bidder declares the trump suit, and each player discards any non-trump cards. If a player has more than six trumps, he or she must discard down to six cards. Next, the dealer will deal each player back up to six total cards. Finally, the dealer brings their own hand to six cards, and is allowed to look at remaining cards when doing so. If too few trump cards remain, the dealer may take any card he or she chooses. This discard process ensures that all trump cards are in play.

Game play is normal with the 2 winning conditions: the first team to win a bid that brings them above 100 points or if a team reaches -100 points the other team is declared winner. (A variant to the scoring is that if a team reaches -200 points it is considered a "backdoor" and the game is a draw.)

Variant

Legal bids are 9–18. 18 is called "hotshot". The pitcher need not lead a trump. Bidding "hotshot" makes the game sudden death; if the bidder succeeds and collects all 18 points in the round, he wins the entire game, but if he fails, the game is over.

==== Nine-five regional (northwest Connecticut) ====
The player to the left of the pitcher leads the first card, and is not required to lead trump. If all players pass, the cards are shown face up to prove the lack of a forced bid, and the deal is passed to the left. Holding a "9" and another card of the same suit is a forced minimum bid of 9.

The winning bidder will announce the trump suit, players will then discard unwanted cards face up into the "scrap pile" The dealer then deals the draw cards to bring each player back to six cards. Note: Discarded "trump" cards can be claimed by any player simply by pulling them out of the scrap, (this rarely happens but prevents a dump of point cards, i.e. 9 & 5). The scoring is exactly the same as traditional "Nines and Fives". The game is won by the first team that scores 100 or more. This somewhat obscure variation of the lead forces the non bidding team to "Block" or "Post" a higher trump than the 9 if possible, to prevent the bidder from "running' the 9 on the first trick and then forcing the bidder to play in between his opponents. The bidding partner helps greatly by playing the Ace or King on an early trick to give the bidder a chance to run the 9.

==== Five-nine regional (northeast Connecticut) ====
Similar to the northwest Connecticut variation, with the only differences being in the bidding phase. Bidding can range from the minimum of 5 to a maximum of "double-18." Double-18s require the team winning the bid to win every single trick and rewards 36 points. If no one bids, the dealer is required to take it for 5. Winning requires both a score over 100 and for the team to win the bidding and subsequently making their bid.

==== Bonanza pitch ====
Four players play in 2 sets of partners, with partners sitting across from each other. Each player is dealt 6 cards, with 4 face-down cards in the kitty. There are 18 total points that can be earned in a round: high (1 pt), low (1 pt), jack (1 pt), 10 (1 pt), 9 (9 pts), and 5 (5 pts). There is an auction bid that continues until all but one player has passed. Players can bid up to 18 or shoot the moon. If all other players pass, the dealer is forced to bid 1.

The player that wins the bid must declare trump before collecting the kitty. Players then discard all cards that are not trump. If the player that wins the bid has more than 6 cards, they must discard down to 6 cards and show the other players which trump cards are being discarded. The dealer then deals each player back up to 6 cards. The player that won the bid must lead trump on the first trick. Players must always follow suit when possible. If a player does not have a non-trump suit that was led, they may play a trump card to take the trick.

Shooting the moon means that the team that won the bid must get all 18 points. Teams cannot shoot the moon if either team is "in the hole" (they have a score below zero) or has a score of 46 or above. If they succeed, they win the whole game. If they fail to win all 18 points, that team loses the game.

A team has won the game when it reaches a score of 64 or above. If both teams exceed 64 points on the same hand, the team that won the bid for that hand wins the game, even if that team has a lower score.

==== Bundrick Setback ====
This Georgia variation of Nine-Five Pitch has two teams of two players sat alternatingly. Each player is dealt 6 cards with 6 cards face down and 3 cards face up (9 cards in total) in the widow. Auctioning begins to the left of the dealer with a minimum bid of 10 and a maximum bid of 21 and continues clockwise until only one player has not passed or until a player bids "21 and out", distinct and greater than a bid of 21, and similar to shooting the moon in other variants.

The high bidder takes all 9 cards of the widow, and announces the trump suit. Teammates may not communicate at this time to help with trump suit selection. All players must discard all non-trump cards at this time, and these cards are removed from play. The dealer, moving clockwise, refills each player's hand to 6 cards. Any remaining cards are then dealt one at a time to players, clockwise. Players must then discard until they have only 6 cards. If a player if forced to discard a trump (i.e. from a hand containing 7 or more trumps), it is announced to all players. If a player discards a trump worth points, the next non-point card still in play now assumes that point value (e.g. discarding the 2 of trumps makes the 3 of trumps worth 1 point.

The deck is a standard 52 card deck with 2 jokers. The jokers must be labeled the "high" and "low" or "big" and "little" joker before hands are dealt. The cards are ranked and scored as follows:

Rank	Ace	King	Queen	Jack	Off-jack	Big joker	Little joker	10	9	8	7	6	5	4	3	2
Value	1	0	0	1	1	1	1	1	9	0	0	0	5	0	0	1

The auction winner leads play on the first trick with the previous trick winner leading play on subsequent tricks. There are no restrictions on which card can be played first in a trick, but if that card is a trump, the other three players must all play trumps. If a player has no trumps but must play one, they are out of the round and discard the remainder of their hand to wait for the next round. Highest ranking trump card played wins the trick, or the first card played wins if no trumps were played.

When all 6 tricks have been played, the teams total their points from the cards they won. The team who did not win the widow simply gets the number of points they captured. The team who won the widow gets the number of points they captured only if that number is at least as high as their bid. If they did not meet their bid, they receive negative points in the amount of their bid, and the points they won during play are ignored (i.e. getting 16 points on a 17 point bid is worth -17 not -1, no offsetting). In the case that the bid was "21 and out", capturing all 21 points is worth +52 points. Failing to capture all 21 points on a "21 and out bid" is worth -52 points. The first team to reach a positive 52 points wins.

=== Further variations ===
==== Juniper pitch ====
pitch is played with 3 teams with 3 partners each. Partners are seated an equal 2 seat between each other. All 54 cards (including high joker and low joker). Points are awarded for high trump (ace), jack of trump, high joker, low joker, low trump (2) and trick/card points (82 points possible, each joker worth 1/2 point). Each player left of the dealer has a chance to bid 1-6 points with the winning bidder leading their trump. If a team does not make their bid they must give back any points (chips) they have accumulated and receive 1 negative point (pookie).

==== Reverse pitch ====
Reverse pitch follows all of the rules of basic pitch, except the low card takes each trick (the lowest card of the suit lead or lowest card of the trump suit). High, low, jack, and game points are scored in the normal fashion. In this variation, valuable cards become much harder to capture; the strength of the card itself is almost always insufficient.

==== Backdoor win ====
Reaching the negative equivalent of the goal wins in some versions of pitch. For example, when the goal is 11 points, a score of -11 or lower would win the game. Some variants instead allow a backdoor win for a team with extremely low points: with a goal of 100 points, -200 might win.

==== Capture low ====
In some variants, the low trump wins the trick in which it is played. This is used only in variants where the 2 of trumps is certain to be played.

==== Two-trump ====
Two-trump pitch is a variation of which incorporates all 54 cards. It may be played with any combination of 3-9 players. Nine points are possible: high, low, jack, sub-high, sub-low, sub-jack, both jokers, and game. Bids 3 (or 4) to 9 are allowed. Games are played to 26 points. In this variation, the player who wins the bid declares both the trump and sub-trump suits. sub-trump cards rank above non-trumps, but below trumps. Players follow suit as in other variations; sub-trumps do not count as trumps for this purpose. sub-trumps may be used to "trump in," on non-trump leads, however. If a sub-trump is lead, main trump can be "trumped in". jokers are unranked and cannot be used to capture other cards. When leading a joker it is considered to be suit-less, the second play of the trick determines the lead suit, and players must follow suit as usual from there. If a trump suit is lead, jokers may not be cut in if the player in possession of the joker has cards of that trump remaining. A joker may be cut in at any time if a non-trump suit is lead, regardless of the players remaining cards. A further variant of the two trump game is to allow a joker to be played if the other joker was lead, regardless of the second card played in the trick and the rest of the players hand. This is known as the double down override as it is performing a "double down" and adding at least a second point to the trick.
