= 63rd Illinois Infantry Regiment =

63rd Regiment Illinois Volunteer Infantry
- Illinois state flag
- Active: April 10, 1862, to July 13, 1865
- Country: United States
- Allegiance: Union
- Branch: Infantry
- Engagements: Siege of Vicksburg, Battle of Bentonville

The 63rd Regiment Illinois Volunteer Infantry was an infantry regiment that served in the Union Army during the American Civil War.

== Service ==
63rd Regiment Illinois was organized at Anna, Illinois and mustered into Federal service on April 10, 1862.

The regiment was discharged from service on July 13, 1865.

== Total strength and casualties ==
The regiment suffered 2 officers and 66 enlisted men who were killed in action or mortally wounded and 1 officer and 137 enlisted men who died of disease, for a total of 206 fatalities.

== Commanders ==
- Colonel Francis Moro - resigned commission September 29, 1862.
- Colonel Joseph B. McCowan - Mustered out with the regiment.

== See also ==
- List of Illinois Civil War Units
- Illinois in the American Civil War
