= 63rd Brigade =

63rd Brigade may refer to:

== British India ==
- 63rd Indian Infantry Brigade, British Indian Army formation during World War II

== Serbia ==
- 63rd Parachute Brigade

== Ukraine ==
- 63rd Mechanized Brigade (Ukraine)

== United Kingdom ==
- 63rd Brigade (United Kingdom), British Army infantry formation during World War I

=== Artillery units ===
- 63rd Brigade, Royal Field Artillery, British Army unit during World War I
- 63rd (6th London) Brigade, Royal Field Artillery, British Army unit after World War I
- 63rd (Northumbrian) Anti-Aircraft Brigade, Royal Artillery
- 63 (North London) Anti-Aircraft Brigade

== United States ==
- 63rd Aviation Brigade (United States)

== See also ==
- 63rd Brigade Support Battalion, United States Army
- 63rd Division (disambiguation)
- 63rd Regiment (disambiguation)
