= 63rd Division =

63rd Division may refer to:

== Infantry divisions ==
- 63rd Infantry Division (Wehrmacht), Germany, World War II
- 63rd Infantry Division "Cirene", Italian Army, World War II
- 63rd Division (Imperial Japanese Army)
- 63rd Infantry Division (Russian Empire)
- 63rd Guards Motor Rifle Division, Soviet Union
- 63rd Guards Rifle Division, Soviet Union
- 63rd Mountain Rifle Division, Soviet Union
- 63rd Rifle Division, Soviet Union
- 63rd Division (Spain)
- 63rd (2nd Northumbrian) Division, British Army, World War I
- 63rd (Royal Naval) Division, British Army, World War I
- 63rd Infantry Division (United States)

== Cavalry divisions ==
- 63rd Cavalry Division (United States)

== Other divisions ==
- 63rd Readiness Division, United States

== See also ==
- List of military divisions by number
- 63rd Brigade (disambiguation)
- 63rd Regiment (disambiguation)
