= Pedro (card game) =

Card game

- Origin: United States
- Alternative names: Cinch, Double Pedro, High Five, Pidro
- Type: Trick-taking
- Players: 2×2
- Skills: Memory, attention
- Cards: 52 cards
- Deck: French
- Rank (high→low): A K Q J 10 9 8 7 6 5 Pedro 4 3 2 (trump)
- Play: Clockwise
- Playing time: 20 minutes
- Chance: Easy

Related games
- Pitch

Pedro is an American trick-taking card game of the all fours family based on auction pitch. Its most popular variant is known as cinch, double Pedro or high five which was developed in Denver, Colorado, around 1885 and soon regarded as the most important American member of the all fours family. Although it went out of fashion with the rise of auction bridge, it is still widely played on the western coast of the United States and in its southern states, being the dominant game in South Louisiana. Forms of the game have been reported from Nicaragua, the Azores, Niobe NY, Italy, and Finland. The game is primarily played by four players in fixed partnerships, but can also be played by 2–6 individual players.

Pedro uses a regular pack of 52 cards, but some variants add a joker called the Dom, hence the name Dom Pedro. The game is much simpler than pitch, in that all points are awarded to the winners of the tricks containing certain specific cards. This includes the game point, which goes to the winner of the trump ten. The winner of the Pedro (five of trumps) receives 5 points. In cinch or Double Pedro the same holds for the Left Pedro (off-five), which counts as a trump. The practice of making sure to win a trick that contains a high-scoring card is referred to as cinching.

== Cinch (double Pedro, high five) ==
The following rules are based on Foster's Complete Hoyle of 1897 and are very similar to the modern Bicycle rules.

Card values (trumps only)
Rank	A	K	Q	J	10	9	8	7	6	5	Off-5	4	3	2
Value	1	—		1	1	—				5	5	—		1

The game is played with a standard pack of 52 cards. The cards are ranked in the usual order, from aces, kings, queens etc. down to twos. As a special case, the off-Pedro, i.e. the non-trump five which is of the same color as trumps, is for all purposes considered to be a member of the trump suit ranking between the Pedro (five of trumps) and the four of trumps. AK2: 12

Like pitch, cinch is a point-trick game, i.e. for winning the trick play one needs to maximize the total value of the cards won in tricks, rather than the number of tricks won. But in cinch (and in Pedro in general) the original card-points were abolished in favor of directly assigning game points to the cards. As a result of this process, only six of the fourteen trumps carry card-values, while the plain suit cards do not score at all.

The first dealer is decided by cutting. The dealer shuffles the pack, and the player to the dealer's right cuts. Nine cards are dealt to each player in batches of three.

Beginning with the eldest hand, each player gets one chance to bid for the privilege of declaring the trump suit. A bid is the number of points that the bidder's party undertakes to win in the deal, the minimum bid being 1 or in some variations, 6. Each player must make a higher bid than any previous player, or pass. The highest possible bid is 14.

When the highest bidder has announced the trump suit, starting with eldest hand each player in turn discards at least three cards face up. The dealer fills each player's hand up to six cards. In the four-player partnership version the dealer's own hand is filled up by robbing the pack: The dealer chooses the cards freely from the remaining stock, and if any trumps remain in the stock discards them openly.

Any scoring trumps discarded by the opponents are counted for the highest bidder's party.

The highest bidder leads to the first trick and need not lead a trump. The standard rules for card play in trick-taking games hold, with one exception: It is always allowed to trump instead of following suit ("follow suit or trump"). As usual, the highest card of the suit led wins each trick, unless a trump is played, in which case the highest trump played wins. The winner of a trick leads to the next trick.

Both parties count the card-points in their tricks. If the bidding party keeps the contract, i.e. wins the required number of card-points, the party that won more card-points scores the difference. Otherwise the opponents score their own result plus the value of the bid.

== Sixty-three ==
Card values (trumps only)
Rank	A	K	Q	J	10	9	8	7	6	5	Off-5	4	3	2	Joker
Value	1	25	—	1	1	9	—			5	5	—	15	1	N/A
Value	1	25	—	1	1	9	—			5	5	—	—	1	15

This variant of the four-player game combines King Pedro (very high card-value of 25 for the trump king) and Pedro Sancho (card-value of 9 for the trump nine), and also gives a card-value of 15 to a low trump, resulting in an overall score of 63 points in the pack. The game can be played with a Joker, in which case it is the lowest trump and scores 15. Otherwise the three of trumps scores 15. After the bidding, which can go over several rounds, each player is dealt 4 more cards. (Thus all cards are dealt or exactly one card remains, depending on whether the Joker is in use.) Players discard down to six cards as usual. The game is played for 152 points.

In eighty-three, a variant reported from Maine, the queen of trumps also has a card-value of 20. Players are dealt 12 cards each, leaving a kitty of 4–5 cards (depending on whether there is a joker). Minimum bid is 30, and the highest bidder receives the kitty. Players discard down to six cards, subject to the usual restrictions (no trumps, no scoring trumps). The first card led need not be a trump.

== History ==
The original game of Pedro, which developed in the nineteenth century from auction pitch, did not have partnerships (so from four to seven could play). It also did not use the "off-suit" Pedro or have a second deal. There was only one round of bidding. In keeping with the game's descent from all fours, the ace of trumps was called "high", the two was called "low", and the ten was called "game". The nine of trumps, called "sancho", was worth nine points.

A variant called Dom Pedro or Snoozer counted the three of trumps as three points and used the joker, called the snoozer, which ranked as the lowest trump and counted fifteen points.

The modern games described above are based on a variant called Cinch, Double Pedro, or High Five, which arose in Denver, Colorado, around 1885. Cinch was usually played in partnerships and included the second pedro (called "left pedro") and the second deal (the dealer's part of which was called "robbing the pack"). The joker was not used and the nine and three did not count. The name came from the necessity for the third player to each trick to "cinch" it, that is, play a trump higher than the five (unless one had already been played to the trick) so the fourth player could not make a pedro.

In Jack London's short story "The Unexpected," the main characters spend the long winter evenings in Alaska playing "endless games of whist and pedro."

Around 1900, Cinch, Whist, and Euchre were the most popular card games for serious players, though auction bridge (introduced in 1904) replaced them. As of 1956, Cinch was still considered "one of the top-ranking games of skill". It had bidding conventions for the first bidder to give information to his or her partner, such as: with a pedro, bid 5; with an ace and three or four cards in the same suit, bid 6; with an ace-king, bid 7 (Morehead, Frey, and Mott-Smith 1956).

== Variations ==
Most variations involve differences in the point assignments.

=== California Pedro ===
Card values (trumps only)
Rank	A	K	Q	J	10	9	8	7	6	5	Off-5	4	3	2
Value	1	—		3	1	—				5	5	—		1

The players are each dealt nine cards, three at a time, after which bidding begins to the right of the dealer with the lowest possible bid being 6. If a player does not wish to bid, they "pass" the bid onto the next player. When the bidding comes back around to the dealer, the highest bid gets to call the suit. If a team does not make their bid their point total is negatively affected by the bid amount. When the suit has been called, players discard all non-suited cards (except the other five, or pedro, of the same color). Some play that a discarded trump can be grabbed by any player but I have seen rules that say no. This is to keep players from discarding low trump in hope of a better one. Also the 2 of trump stays with whomever has it. Making 16/32 very difficult. Then they are dealt the number of cards needed to reach 6. When the deal comes back around to the dealer, the dealer then sorts through the remaining deck and picks out the cards he needs to bring their hand up to 6. If there are more than 6 suited cards remaining in the deck, the dealer can take all of them but must reduce the number of cards in his hand to 5 on the first play. In order to win the game a team must have 52 or more points as well as claim and make the bid.

Also unique to California Pedro is that when a player bids 16 and makes the bid that total is doubled to equal 32 as a bonus, because it is so rare. One unofficial rule of California Pedro is no "table talk". In other words, no player is allowed to make subtle hints of his/her hand to their respective teammate in relation to their bid or potential play. There is no official penalty for "table talk" and it is loosely enforced at best.

One variation of California Pedro has the J worth 1 point. The total trump cards add up to 14.

Another variation of California Pedro allows a team to "Shoot [for] the moon." They must make a 14 point bet. If they don't take 14 points, they lose the game. If they do, they win the game. Often done when one team is down and the other team is about to win.

=== Five-handed Pedro ===
Five-Handed Pedro is a variation whereby five people can play the game at once, with no dedicated partners. The game begins with the dealer dealing all but two cards in a clockwise fashion to each of the five players, for a total of ten cards each. The remaining two cards are set aside until later. Bidding commences from the dealer's left, with bids ranging from 6-16 points. The player who wins the bid is immediately given the two remaining deck cards, and must then call a trump suit. Players then discard, retaining all trump cards and any number of distrump cards necessary to arrive at a total of six cards in their hand. In the event a player has more than six trump, he or she retains all of his trump, playing the lowest non-point cards (3, 4, 6, etc.) concurrently with each hand until the extras are gone.

After the discard, the winning bidder places his lead card in the center of the table, and asks for another card not in his hand. The player who holds this card throws it into the center of the table, and these two are partners until the next deal, as are the remaining three players partners. Play then continues as in traditional Pedro, with the caller and partner needing to win enough points to equal their bet. Failure to do so results in a loss of points equal to the bet, regardless of any points earned during the hand.

Play continues until one player reaches 104 points.

=== Lipton variation (Canadian prairies) ===
Card values (trumps only)
Rank	A	K	Q	J	Off-jack	10	9	5	Off-5	2
Value	1	20	—	1	1	1	—	5	5	1

A variation of the game commonly known as "King Pedro" is played in Saskatchewan, in the area of Regina but associated most strongly with the village of Lipton.

The Lipton variation uses a reduced deck of 32 cards, which includes all aces and face cards, but only the 10, 9, 5, and 2 from the numeric cards. All 4 players are dealt 7 cards each hand, with the remaining 4 cards left over forming a "missy" (similar to the kitty in the Sixty-Three variant above), from which the winning bidder may then pick up or discard as they choose (while maintaining a 7-card hand).

Bidding begins once all cards have been dealt. The minimum allowed bid is 15, and the maximum bid is 35—the maximum number of points that can be won in a hand. Traditionally, bidding starts with the player on the dealer’s left and proceeds in that direction, with the dealer bidding last.

Scoring is as in traditional Pedro, except that if the bidding party fails to meet their contract (known as being “set"), they lose a number of card-points equivalent to their original bid, while the opposing team gains the number of card-points taken in the course of the hand. Play continues until one team reaches either 105 points, or -105 points (in which case the opposing team wins.)

The king is especially important in this variant of Pedro, and winning without it is very difficult. A player who wins a contract by bidding aggressively with few trump cards and then gains the needed cards from the missy is said to pull a "Bob Hays", a reference to a legendary player of King Pedro from Lipton who was well-known for bidding aggressively without a king, and then picking it up from the missy.

=== One Canadian variation ===
Card values (trumps only)
Rank	A	K	Q	J	10	9	8	7	6	5	Off-5	4	3	2
Value	1	25	—	1	1	9	—			5	5	—		1

=== Isle Madame variation ===
In Isle Madame and surrounding areas on Cape Breton Island, (Province of Nova Scotia, Canada) the game is called Pede and is played in both French and English.

The point system is as follows:

Card values (trumps only)
Rank	A	K	Q	J	10	9	8	7	6	5	Off-5	4	3	2
Value	1	25	—	1	1	—				5	5	—		1

Total of 39 points.

The Isle Madame version is generally played with the following variations:

- The joker is not used.
- Bidding is from 25 to 39.
- Sometimes players will bid without a king to lure the other team into bidding higher. This can be costly since the king is required to make any bid.
- The dealer has an advantage since he does not discard. After all other players have received their second fill, the dealer mixes the remaining cards into his own nine cards and then sorts through all the cards. Thus, no one knows how many trump the dealer had in his original nine cards.
- No one can ever have more than six cards. If someone has more than six trump, they must discard non-scoring cards. Should they have all seven point scoring cards, they must discard a card worth 1 point, usually the ten.
- Winner of the bid must lead trump on the first trick (book). If they have no trump, they can play anything (rare).
- When a nontrump ('offsuit') card is led, players must follow suit, unless they wish to play a trump. If they cannot follow suit, they may play anything. The rank of nontrump is exactly the same as trump, with the Pede as the only exception. Although the trick is worth nothing, it decides who leads the next card. Thus, the nontrump cards that the dealer decides to keep might influence the outcome of the play. Note that trump cards always take any nontrump cards.
- When players run out of trump they may fold their hand by throwing it face down on the table. They are out of play for all remaining tricks of this round.
- If the winners of the bid lose the king, this is referred to as the 'death' of the King since the score of the team that won the bid goes down significantly and the score of the other team goes up significantly.
- Winner of the game is the first team to reach 221. When a team reaches any score over 199, their score is locked in place. The only way that their score will change (including winning the game) is if they take the bid OR make the other team's bid. If they make the other team's bid this is an automatic win at any score above 199.

=== Tennessee variation ===
In central Tennessee, the game is played as described above with a few variations in point cards, trump cards, and scoring.

- Rules for first deal, bidding, second deal, and play are as described above.
- More trump cards are defined, and a 54 card deck (standard with two jokers) is used. Both jokers, and the off-suit jack (same color as trumps) are defined to be trumps along with the suit called by the winning bidder. One joker is deemed the "main joker" and the other is deemed the "off joker" – usually the joker with the small print describing the playing card manufacturer copyright and information is the "off joker".

Card values (trumps only)
Rank	A	K	Q	J	Off-J	Joker	Off-Joker	10	9	8	7	6	5	Off-5	4	3	2
Value	1	—		1	1	1	1	1	—				5	5	—		1

- The "keeper" rule does not apply to the 2.
- Minimum bid is 9, or in some variations 10. If none of the three players bid, the dealer gets the bid for 9 or 10 - called a "push up". Maximum bid is 17. The minimum bid is at least 9, because it is more than half of 17.
- The game is played to 52 points, thus forcing 4 hands (only 51 points can be scored in 3 hands).
- In the event of a tie, with both teams having 52 points or more, the bidding team wins.
- "Shooting the Moon" is sometimes allowed. To win the game, the team must capture all 17 points. The team shooting the moon does not necessarily have to catch every trick.
- If a team has a negative score, ("in the hole") then the first bidding player is required to "shoot the moon" and the second bidding player is required to "double shoot the moon". This situation forces the calling of trumps to the second player in the bidding rotation, on the team desiring to shoot the moon.
- "Shooting the moon" is not necessarily allowed, depending on the rules established between players at the beginning of the game.
- There is no rank among non-trump cards. Example: spades are trumps, a 2 of hearts is led, no other player plays a trump card—the player playing the 2 of hearts catches the trick and plays first again, even if the ace of hearts is played by someone else on top of it. Any trump card catches any non-trump card.
- The cards that are left after the second deal are referred to as the "widow". If the bidder has 6 or more trumps after having sorted through the widow, he may slide trump or non-trump cards to his partner. If receiving trumps causes the receiving partner to have more than 6 trumps, he then gives a trump card (usually of no value) to the opposing player to his right.
- Players on the non-bidding-team may elect to give up and "throw in" or "throw down" to save time, thus awarding the team that won the bid all 17 points. Sliding non-trump cards can sometimes bluff the non-bidding team into giving up, when perhaps a point or two could have been captured.
- In the (unlikely) event that a player on the non-bidding-team has more than 6 trumps, then he may slide to his partner as above.
- A "misdeal" may be called if a player has no point cards during the first 9-card deal. A slight variation on this rule adds no point cards or face cards.
- When a player runs out of trumps, he must state that they are "down" and discard the remaining part of his hand after the lead player plays on the next trick; even if non-trumps are led.
- With a 54 card deck in use, there are 18 cards remaining for the second deal. The total number of cards held by the 3 players not winning the bid, will be the number of cards that the bidder gets in the widow. If all 3 players call for 6 cards each - none has any trumps - then the bidder gets no widow.

=== Louisiana variation ===
Card values (trumps only)
Rank	A	K	Q	J	10	9	8	7	6	5	Off-5	4	3	2
Value	1	—		1	1	—				5	5	—		1

Played primarily in South Louisiana, this variation uses a 52 card deck (no jokers). Whoever plays the 2 keeps that point for their team; no player may 'win' the 2. The most points a team can make in one hand is 14. A player may wish to bid 14-28 (often called 14 in the dark), but he must bid this before the cards are dealt. If the team makes all 14 points, they are rewarded with 28 points. The minimum bid is 7, and if no one bids, the dealer is allowed to bid 6 (commonly called the force bid), although in Southeastern Louisiana the force bid is often 7.

When a player is discarding their non trump cards into the trash pile and a trump card is mistakenly thrown out the trump card discarded is considered "fair game." Whichever individual who can first grab the erroneously discarded trump card is allowed to keep the card. Violence is allowed but frowned upon in these situations. If the new player in possession of the card is above the hand limit they must discard a card of their choice to stay within the limit. If the discarded trump is picked up before one has received their new cards from the dealer the phase carries on and the player reduces their hand to the limit.

Also, in this variation "cut-throat" may be played. "Cut Throat" Pedro, rules state that any card may be played when an off trump card leads the hand. You are only required to follow with the trump off card in the "follow suit" version. Also, if one player bids 14-28 then another player may bid 28-56. You can only bid 28-56 if another player first bids 14-28. Commonly, you must have both the ace and deuce to bid either 14-28 or 28-56, but this requirement may be disregarded in some house rules.

=== Railroad Pedro ===
This variation follows the same general rules as regular Pedro only with five players and six cards per player dealt on the first deal. After the bidding process and the second deal, the winning bidder must lead and call trump card that he or she does not have. The player holding that card must play it on the first trick. That player becomes partners with the bidder and the remaining three players are partners against the bidder and his or her partner. At the conclusion of the hand, each player is given the total number of points that their team won.

The winning bidder may also choose to "go alone" on any bid after the second deal. In this case no card is called for and the other four players become partners against the bidder. If the "alone" bid is successful the point totals for the hand are doubled for both sides. If the "alone" bid is not successful the bidder loses double the points that were bid while the opposition gains double their point total for the hand. The first player to reach 62 wins. In the event that both the bidder and his or her partner reach 62 on the same hand the bidder wins. If two members of the team opposing the bidder on the final hand pass 62 the player with the highest score wins. If they are tied the game will continue until the tie is broken.

=== Italian variation ===
Card values (trumps only)
Rank	A	K	Q	J	10	9	8	7	6	5	Off-5	4	3	2
Value	1	—		3	1	—				5	5	—		1

16 points total for the hand, play until 91 points is reached. The winner must bid on the winning hand and will win upon reaching 91 points or higher on a bid, regardless of who has more points.

=== Finnish variation, Pidro ===
Card values (trumps only)
Rank	A	K	Q	J	10	9	8	7	6	5	Off-5	4	3	2
Value	1	—		1	1	—				5	5	—		1

In Finland, the games is played in Swedish speaking Ostrobothnia, Finland.

The rules are almost like of the basic cinch described in this article, with major exception that only trumps are played. The other cards in players' hands are just for disguise, to make initial six for everyone. When a player runs out trumps, they place their remaining cards face up on the table and won't participate to remaining tricks.

This leads to somewhat different game dynamics compared to North American Cinch: All partnership cooperation must take place early, at the third or fourth trick at latest. At fourth trick, at least one player has run out of trumps. At fifth trick, there will be two players remaining at most. This means, a person with many but not very good trumps may still be able to win points for the team by leaving scoring cards to the last tricks, of which they are the only participant.

=== Monterey County variation(s) ===
On the Central Coast of California, specifically in Monterey County, two versions of Pedro are played, "draw Pedro" (often played in the southern region) and "the widow" (often played in the northern region). The scoring for both versions are the same, using the "Italian" variation's scoring matrix. The game play for both versions is the same and differs slightly from the aforementioned variations. Both versions have 4 players, 2 sets of partners sitting opposite one another, who are dealt 52 cards total. The way the cards are dealt and the bidding differ slightly.

In the "draw" version, the players are each dealt 9 cards (three at a time), after which, bidding begins to the left of the dealer, with the lowest possible bid being 6. If a player does not wish to bid, they "pass" the bid goes onto the next player. When the bidding comes back around to the dealer, the highest bidder gets to call the suit. When the suit has been called, players discard all non-suited cards (except the other pedro of the same color), then they are dealt the amount needed to reach 6. When the deal comes back around to the dealer, the dealer then sorts through the remaining deck and picks out the cards he needs to bring their hand up to 6. If there are more than 6 suited cards remaining in the deck, the dealer must take all of them into their hand.

In "the widow" version, the players are each dealt 9 cards, with the remaining 16 cards in the deck dealt face down in front of each player, so that each player now has an additional 4 cards. These cards cannot be viewed until after bidding takes place. The bid starts to the dealer's left and proceeds clockwise around the table. After each player bids or passes, they can pick up their remaining 4 cards. When the bid has gone around the table and after the dealer has picked up his cards, the winning bidder can then choose their suit. The players then discard non-suited cards (except the other pedro of the same color), holding onto all suited cards, even in excess of 6 in a hand.

The following rules of game play apply to both versions:

After the cards are dealt, the game begins with the winning bidder leading the first hand. The first lead must be trump. If any player has more than 6 trump cards, he must lay down enough trumps to bring their remaining hand down to 5. Also, the cards "discarded" must not be point cards and the card placed on top will be the official card played for that hand. Play continues normally, with the exceptions that whoever plays the "2" gets its point regardless of who plays the highest card in the trick, and whoever wins a hand can start the next hand "off-suit"; at which time, players must play the off-suit that was led if they kept any of that suit in their hand, if a player does not have the off-suit that was led then they can play any other off-suit, a "trump" or on-suit card can be played at any time. After leading off-suit, if no one else plays a higher card of the suit led or a trump, the player who led maintains the lead. In the case of trump cards played in an off-suit hand, the highest trump always takes the next lead. A player is out of the round when they are unable to follow a trump led with a trump of their own. As in the "Italian" variation, whichever team reaches 91 first wins.

Both versions are incredibly popular throughout the county and are often played in "card parties", in which several tables play at once, each one numbered. After each round, the deal is passed to the next person at the table, until the deal goes around the table once. After the round of 4 deals, the individual players will switch partners throughout the party by moving up or down a table, depending on whether they win or lose. At the end of the party, the players with the winning scores amassed throughout the night can choose prizes.

=== Oregon variation ===
Card values (trumps only)
Rank	A	K	Q	J	Off-J	10	9	8	7	6	5	Off-5	4	3	2
Value	1	—		1	1	1	—				5	5	—		1

This variation has also been called "Bid Pedro" because of its focus on the bidding process. Play is similar to Double Pedro other than the following changes.

There are a total of 15 points because of the addition of the Off-Jack as a point card. The minimum bid is 6 with a maximum bid of 15. If the first three bidders pass, the dealer can bid 5. The bidders name a suit as they bid, for example, "6 Hearts". The suits are ranked, from highest to lowest, Spades, Hearts, Clubs, Diamonds. For example, if the first bidder says "6 Diamonds" then the second bidder could bid "6 Clubs" because clubs are ranked higher than diamonds. If the first bidder had said "6 Spades" then a bid of at least "7 Diamonds" would be needed to beat the first bid. Bidding continues until three players pass. Bidders may change their suit during the bidding process, but not after a winning bid is declared. A player may pass once around, and then bid the second time in rare occasions. For example, if the first bidder says "6 Diamonds" and one has a weak hand in Diamonds, you pass, then bidding goes around and comes back to you and now the high bid is "7 Clubs". At this point one can re-enter the bidding process as long as one's bid is higher than "7 Clubs".

When play is done, if a player fails to make his bid, he goes down in points by the number of his bid. The opposing team always keep whatever points they earn. This means that on a bid of 6, the opposing team could make 9 points and both teams' scores would go up. The game is won when one team reaches 63 points. If both teams reach 63 or higher, and have a tie score, then the bidding team wins. Some people play a tie-breaker hand instead.

By bidding in suits, the player's partner gets the chance to signal if they have supporting cards with their own bid by giving a supporting bid, or counter bid. ex. If the first bidder says "6 clubs" and the third bidder has a supporting 5 or many cards of the same suit, then he/she may bid "7 Clubs" to support their partner. This does add confusion because the highest bidder leads, so the player with the weaker hand may end up with the lead by giving a supporting bid. In this same example, if the third player did not have any supporting clubs, but had some high spades, they may choose to counter bid "6 Spades" in hopes that Jacks and 5s of same color may match their partner's hand.

After bidding, players discard all non-suited cards to the left of the dealer. Any point cards accidentally thrown into the discard pile go directly to the dealers hand before play begins. Non-suited cards have no rank. If a non-suited card is led, players may play any card in their hands regardless of suit; if no trump card is played on the Trick, the leader retains the lead. If trump is led and one cannot follow suit, i.e. one is out of trump, then you discard your hand to the discard pile and play continues without you.

There are many complexities in this version due to the 15-point total, and the ability to signal to a partner with the bid. This is an excellent variation for advanced Pedro players looking to add a bit of challenge to the game.
