= 63rd Regiment =

63rd Regiment or 63rd Infantry Regiment may refer to:

- 63rd (The West Suffolk) Regiment of Foot, an infantry unit of the British Army
- 63rd Palamcottah Light Infantry, a unit of the British Indian Army
- 63rd Armor Regiment, a unit of the US Army
- 63rd Infantry Division (United States), a unit of the US Army
- 63rd Cavalry (India), a unit of the Indian Army

American Civil War

Union (Northern) Army

- 63rd Illinois Volunteer Infantry Regiment
- 63rd Indiana Infantry Regiment
- 63rd New York Infantry
- 63rd Ohio Infantry
- 63rd Pennsylvania Infantry
- 63rd United States Colored Infantry Regiment

Confederate (Southern) Army

- 63rd Virginia Infantry
