= Bid Euchre =

Trick-taking card game

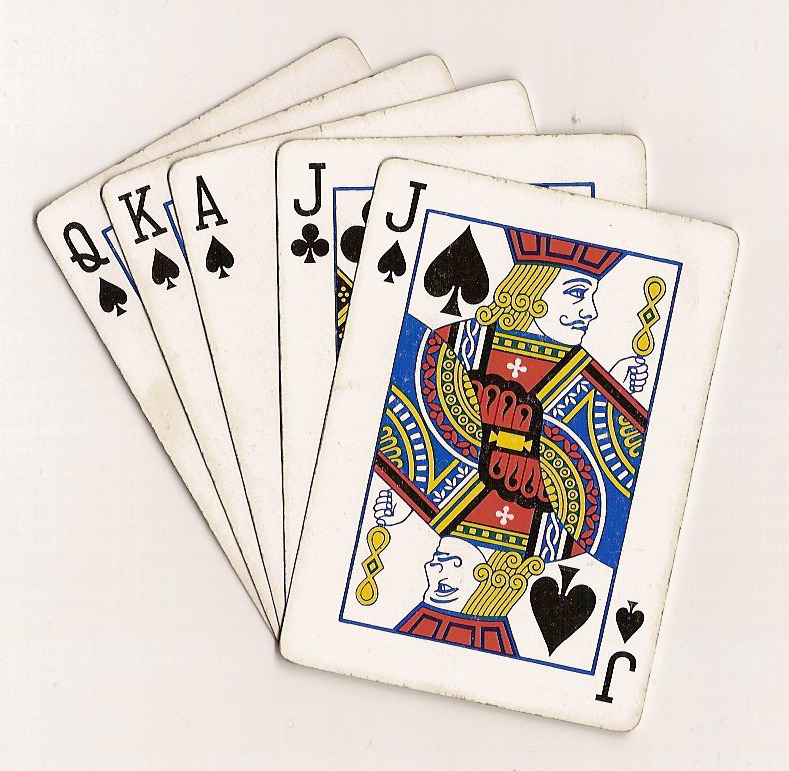
- Origin: United States
- Alternative names: Hoss, Pfeffer, Indiana Double Deck
- Family: Trick-taking
- Players: 2-6 (usually 4)
- Skills: Tactics & Strategy
- Cards: 24, 32, 36, 48 (2x24)
- Deck: French
- Play: Clockwise
- Playing time: 20 min. (single deck) - 40 min (double deck)
- Chance: Low (double deck) - Medium (single deck)

Related games
- Euchre, 500, Hoss

Bid Euchre, Auction Euchre, French Euchre, Pepper, Moonshot, or Hasenpfeffer, is the name given to a group of card games played in North America based on the game Euchre. It introduces an element of bidding in which the trump suit is decided by which player can bid to take the most tricks. Variation comes from the number of cards dealt, the absence of any undealt cards, the bidding and scoring process, and the addition of a no trump declaration. It is typically a partnership game for four players, played with a 24, 32 or 36-card pack, or two decks of 24 cards each.

== Single Deck Bid Euchre ==
A pack of 24 cards containing 9, 10, J, Q, K, and A in each suit is used. The rank of the cards in the trump suit is: J (of the trump suit, also known as the "right bower" or bauer; high), J (of the other suit of the same colour as the trump suit, also known as the "left bower" or bauer), A, K, Q, 10, 9 (low). In the plain suits, the rank is: A (high), K, Q, J, 10, 9 (low). When playing with no trumps, all four suits follow the 'plain suit' ranking. Cards are dealt one at a time to each player, clockwise, starting with the player to the dealer's left. Each player receives six cards. Variations of the number of cards dealt, scoring values, and winning requirements exist, and are agreed to before game play.

=== Bidding ===
Bidding is the primary way in which Bid Euchre is different from standard Euchre. A bid is the number of tricks that a player wagers for his or her team to win and each bid must be higher than any preceding it. Each player, beginning at dealer's left, may either bid or pass. Starting at the person to the left of the dealer, each player "bids" how many "tricks" he or she thinks it is possible to get in partnership with his/her partner (sitting across the table). "Trump bids" are the numbers four through six. Players may bid, or choose to pass. Common bids are three, four, or five. One is not a typical bid. There are some variations, but in most traditional games the bidding only goes around the table once, with each player bidding one time. At the end of bidding, whoever bids highest wins the bid and gets to name the suit that will become trump. Bidding does not generally exceed five (the maximum is six), as there are two special bids.

==== The two bid ====
There is special meaning given to the "two bid." If a player holds two jacks of the same color (both "black" jacks or both "red" jacks), the player can bid "two" to indicate to the player's partner this special possession. This gives useful information to the partner when placing a bid.

=== Pepper exchanges ===
- A small pepper (Note: small pepper: "shooting", "give me your best", and "one best" are variants) is a play where the bidder gets to exchange one card with his/her partner (but does not get to choose or say which card is wanted, only declare the suit that is trump), and then plays alone against the other two players. The partner also has the option to return the original card back to the bidder if he/she chooses to do so. The bidding player or team must get all six tricks. If all six tricks are won, the team with the winning small pepper receives seven points.
- A big pepper (Note: big pepper: also "loner" or "moon") is the same as a small pepper, except the bidder does not get any cards from his/her partner, and, if successful, receives 14 points. Players may also call it "super moon", which is when he attempts to get all six bids without looking at his hand first and does not receive any help from his partner. If someone calls "one best," "moon," or "super moon," the dealer is allowed to call the same or higher bid and win the bid. (Note: Note: In another variation of this game, known as "hawsy" (short for Hasenpfeffer), the little pepper is known as "hawsy" and there is no big pepper. If one player bids hawsy, the next player can bid "double hawsy" for an attempt at 24 points. Note: Another variation includes these 'pepper' bids, but calls them 12s and 24s as those are the points awarded. If a player calls 24, their partner can call 48. A call of 48 would mean that the calling player names the trump suit and their partner must take all 6 tricks alone with no pass card. This is rare but not impossible. The highest call would be a 96, and the calling player must decide on the trump suit before seeing their cards, and then take all 6 tricks. Again, not impossible, but highly improbable.)

=== Leading, taking tricks, and scoring ===
At the end of bidding, the winning (or "contracting") bidder makes the opening play and may lead any card. Going clockwise, the other players each play a card and must follow suit if possible. If a player cannot follow suit, any card can be played. There is no rule about who may play trump first. The trick goes to the highest trump or, if there are no trump cards, to the highest card of the suit led. The winner of a trick leads to the next trick. The contracting side scores one point for each trick taken if it makes at least its contract but is set back (loses) six points if it fails to make its contract, regardless of the value of the contract or the tricks actually won. As such, a side can have a negative score. If the side playing defense (that is, the side that does not win the bid) fails to get any tricks, it goes back six points. An exception to this is in cases of a 'pepper' bid. With this contract, if all the tricks are taken, the contracting side wins 14 or 12 points (for the big and small pepper, respectively). If the contracting side fails to take all six tricks, it is set back 14 or 12 points (for big and small peppers, respectively). The opposing side always scores one point for each trick taken. If the defensive side does not get any tricks in a small or big pepper, it loses six points.

=== Winning ===
The standard winning number or goal is 42 (32 in "hawsy"). The first team to reach or exceed 42 while on offense wins. (Note: A team with a point total near 42 must win the bid, meet its contract, and exceed 42 points to be considered the winner.) Other variations of the game do not use a winning number and instead allow players to set a time limit such as one or two hours, at the end of which time the team with the highest point total wins.

== Bid euchre variations ==
=== Progressive ===
Progressive Euchre is a tournament format Euchre. Play begins when the lead table rings a bell. The lead table plays eight hands, the deal revolving to the left with each hand, so that each player has dealt twice, then rings the bell again. When the bell rings, players at each table finish their current hand and record their team score on an individual tally. The losing team at the head table moves to the tail table; otherwise, the winning team at each table advances to the next table, and one member of the losing team changes seat so that partners in one game are opponents in the next game. Play begins on the next game immediately without waiting for another signal. After 10 games, players total their tally sheets, to determine the high score and low score for the tournament.

==== Play ====
Each table of four players use a 24-card deck containing A K Q J 10 9 in the four suits (♠ ♥ ♣ ♦). Players bid once each, clockwise around the table, starting at the dealer's left. Bids of one to six are made by stating the number of tricks to be taken. A player must either bid higher than any prior bid, or pass.

A pepper consists of winning all six tricks with a passed card. If no succeeding player wishes to play a loner, the bidder declares suit by saying, "Give me your best heart", "Give me your best club", etc. His partner gives the requested card to the bidder, face down, before seeing the bidder's passed card, and sits out the rest of the hand. As loner bids (asserting that one will win all six tricks without assistance) are pre-emptive and are made by declaring suit and leading out the first trick. The high bidder declares suit as he leads out the first trick. The winner of each trick leads the following trick. Only suits may be declared trump; no-trump and low-no-trump declarations are not permitted. Deal passes around the table, clockwise, after each hand.

Teams score one point for three or four tricks, two points for all five tricks and four points for a loner. A team failing to achieve their number of tricks receives no points for any tricks won, and two points go to the other partner's score. An euchre sweep nets four points.

=== Pfeffer ===
The names "Pfeffer," "Hasenpfeffer," and "Double Hasenpfeffer" (Note: also known as "Hoss" or "Pepper") come from "Hasenpfeffer", a German dish of marinated and stewed trimmings of hare. Pfeffer, is a variation of Pepper and is most often played in the Midwest. Its primary difference is that the dealer is forced to make a "four Trick Bid" when all players pass in front of the dealer. This allows for a strategy of either forcing teams to have to make bids or to "stick the dealer." (Note: When dealer is stuck, dealer gets to name any suit as trump, or may even declare no trump.) The minimum bid for a dealer is four tricks.

==== Play ====
All card hierarchies are the same as Pepper. A Pfeffer bid (a/k/a double-Pfeffer) is a bid to win all six tricks, alone. The player who wins the bid declares trump. For "trump bids," the player to the left of the dealer leads to the first trick and each player must follow suit if possible. The trick is won by the highest card of the suit led, or by the highest trump if any were played. (Note: Note: Left bauer is not in the suit printed on its face, but of the trump suit.) Winner of each trick leads to the next and play continues until all six tricks have been played. For "no-trump bids," the player to the right of the "Declarer" leads. (Note: Note: This counter-clockwise play is different from most Pepper and Bid Euchre variations.)

==== Scoring & Winning ====
For non-Pfeffer bids, the team that declared trump scores one point for each trick taken if they took at least as many tricks as were bid. If the declaring team takes all six tricks, they get six points and the opposing players are "set." They lose five points and receive a "hickey." If the declaring team takes less than the number of tricks bid, they too will set, lose five points and also receive a hickey.

For Pfeffer bids, if the declaring team takes all six tricks, they get twelve points and the opposing team are set, lose five points, and receive a hickey. If the declaring team fails to take all six tricks, they are set, lose ten points, and receive two hickeys.

In all cases, the opposing team simply scores one point for every trick they take. The deal then passes clockwise around the table. The game is to 42 points. In cases of a tie at 42, the bidding team wins. Negative scores are allowed. For purposes of betting, amounts are set for game and sets (Note: Note: Sets are the total number of hickeys on the scoresheet for the losing team.) Games are generally twice the amount as sets. Games ending with the losing team at zero points or below, pay double.

=== Hasenpfeffer ===
Hasenpfeffer, also called Pepper, is a four-player partnership variation of Euchre played with a 24-card pack plus the Joker. Six cards are dealt in batches of three, and the rest are laid face down to one side. Bids are made numerically for the naming of trump, and declarer may name no trump in place of a single suit. If no one bids, the holder of the best bauer is obliged to bid three, and if it then proves to be the card out of play, the deal is annulled. The highest bidder announces trump before play. The bidder's side scores one point per trick won if this is not less than the bid, otherwise, it loses one point per undertrick. The play goes up to 10 points. Competition to secure a call is very keen since one stands to gain more than one stands to lose, but for that very reason the bidding is frequently pushed beyond the level of safety.

=== Buckpfeffer ===
A variation and combination of many bid euchre varieties, "BuckenPeffer" (or "Buck"), involves only one round of bids. The minimum bid is three. If all three players pass before the dealer, like in "Screw the Dealer", the dealer is forced to bid four tricks. There is no second round of bidding and the dealer is then forced to bid four tricks. There is no bidding "two" to inform a partner that the bidder is holding two jacks of the same color. A player may call high or low as trump, but in this case (unless the player calling trump has called a Pfeffer bid (going solo with no partner and required to take all six tricks), the bidder calls hi or low and must exchange their best card (ace if high is called, 9 if low is called) for the worst card (a 9 if high is called, ace if low is called) from the player on the callers left. There are different scoring and waging rules such as burns, double burns, and triple burns. Scoring is different in that teams, not individuals, are scored. Points awarded are the number of tricks taken and the game is generally played to 25 or more. Scoring idiosyncrasies include: if a team takes all six tricks after calling trump, or skunking the other team, they score six plus the number of the tricks they bid. The skunked team has the number of the winning trump bid subtracted from their score.

=== Buck euchre ===
Dirty clubs (or buck euchre), is a variation of the euchre and 500 card games, and similar to Oh Hell – 500. These games are trick-taking card games, but unlike euchre, the players must bid on how many tricks they will take. The game is played by three to six players, depending on the variation. The game uses the same cards as euchre: the 10, J, Q, K, and A of each suit (three players), with lower cards (9, 8, 7, etc.) added if necessary for more players. For the first hand, the dealer is chosen at random, then the deal proceeds clockwise.

==== Play ====
- Each hand, one suit is trump; trump cards are higher than non-trump. The order of cards for the trump suit is the same as euchre: J of the trump suit (right bauer)-J of the other suit of the same color (left bauer)-A-K-Q-10-etc. The order of cards for non-trump suits is A-K-Q-(J)-10-etc.
- Each hand, five cards are dealt to each player; the remaining cards are placed face down (the blind), except the top card, which is flipped face up. If this face-up card is a club - this is called dirty clubs - there is no bidding and clubs are automatic trumps. Otherwise, each player in clockwise order bids a number of tricks they think they can take. The bid can go around a second time, giving players the chance to raise their bid. The high bidder gets to call trump.
- Play begins with the player to the left of the dealer. This player leads with a single card, and the play proceeds clockwise. Players must follow suit if possible. The player who takes the trick gets to lead for the next trick.

==== Scoring ====
Each player starts with the same number of points, which may be 15. The goal is to get to zero. Each player subtracts the number of tricks taken from his score on each hand. However, the high bidder must take at least the number of tricks he bid. If he fails to take this many tricks, instead of subtracting points, he must add five to his score. Therefore, being the high bidder is helpful in that it lets a player call trump, but it is also dangerous as that player is the only one to hold the specified bid.

One variation is that a player who takes no tricks is bumped (penalized) five points regardless of his bid. When this rule is in place, the players are usually given a chance to drop out after trump is called. A player who drops out cannot be penalized, but also cannot take any tricks. Another variation is that if the call goes all the way around without a bid, there is no trump, and players do not get a chance to drop out.

=== Eau Claire Clubs ===
Eau Claire Clubs (also called Dirrties, Clübbérts, or simply Clubs) is similar to Dirty Clubs, with the most notable difference being that it is played with 4 players split into 2 partnerships, instead of “every player for themselves.” It follows the same general bidding, cardplay, and scoring rules as Dirty Clubs, with some exceptions. (E.g., Bottoms, Ace No Face, end-of-game scoring, terminology, et al.)

==== Cards ====
A deck of 24 cards containing A, K, Q, J, 10, 9 of each suit (spades, hearts, diamonds, clubs)

The card rankings are the same as for Euchre:

Trump suit: “Jack” (a.k.a. right bower), “Jick” (a.k.a. left bower), A, K, Q, 10, 9

Side (non-trump) suits: A, K, Q, J*, 10, 9

.*The side suit of the same color as the trump suit is missing its jack, which is serving as the Jick

When playing the hand at High Card, aka notrump, there are no bowers — all four suits follow the ranking of A, K, Q, J, 10, 9

==== Dealing ====
Players each receive 5 cards. Cards are NOT dealt one at a time, but typically in groups of 1, 2, 3, or 4, until each player has 5 cards. For example, each player might receive 2 cards, then 3 more cards the next time around the table, for a total of 5 cards.

(The dealing pattern is commonly identified using basketball-defense parlance — e.g., the aforementioned pattern might be labeled as a “2-3 zone”, while a pattern of 4-then-1 might be labeled a “Box-And-One”.)

The first cards go to the player to the left of the dealer, and the deal proceeds clockwise around the table. Whichever player deals the current hand, the player to their left deals the next hand.

After all the cards are dealt, the dealer places the remaining 4 cards face-down, and then flips the top one up — this is the “up-card”. If the up-card is a club, then clubs are trump for that hand, and no bidding occurs. If the up-card is not a club, bidding proceeds as described in the Bidding section below. A key difference from Euchre is that the up-card never gets "picked up"; rather, it stays on the top of the pile for the entire hand.

Before the first hand of the game, a player from each partnership cuts into the deck. The player with the highest cut-card deals the first hand. (This matters because being the dealer confers a slight advantage, in that the dealer bids last.) Another method for deciding who deals first is to deal the cards one at a time, face-up and clockwise around the table — the first player to receive a black jack (or any other agreed-upon card) begins as dealer.

==== Bidding ====
If the up-card is NOT a club: Each player gets one bid, and one bid only. The player may pass, or bid for the partnership to take some number of tricks.

The player to the left of the dealer opens the bidding. The bid proceeds clockwise around the table. Besides ‘pass’, a player has 7 possible bids:

- 2 (this is a bid for the partnership to take 2 tricks in a trump-suit to be named later)
- 3
- 4
- 5
- 3HC (High Card) — this is a bid to take 3 tricks at high card, aka notrump
- 4HC
- 5HC

Subsequent players may pass, or they may outbid the high bidder thus far. A player may outbid their partner, if they so choose. The rules of outbidding are as follows:

- Any higher trump-suit bid beats any lower trump-suit bid (i.e., 5 beats 4 beats 3 beats 2)
- A bid of 3HC or 4HC is beaten by any trump-suit bid (i.e., 2+ beats 3HC or 4HC)
- A bid of 5HC is beaten by a trump-suit bid of 3 or more (i.e., 3+ beats 5HC)

After each player has bid (or passed), the contract is awarded to the partnership with the highest bid. For example, if the bidding went “4HC-2-Pass-3”, then the dealer’s partnership would be contracted to take 3 tricks.

After the bidding auction concludes, the high bidder calls the trump suit. In the example above, the dealer would call the trump suit after bidding ‘3’.

The high bidder may call any trump suit, regardless of the suit of the up-card. (This is another difference from Euchre, where players cannot call trump in the suit of the up-card.)

==== “Sitting out” ====
After the contract is awarded, the defenders may elect to “sit out”. In this case, the bidding partnership earn points equal to their bid, and the defenders’ score remains the same. For example, the defenders might elect to sit out if they deem it likely that they will be set. If the defenders sit out, the hand is over, the score is adjusted, and the deal proceeds to the next hand.

There are 2 situations where a partnership is prohibited from sitting out:

- If they have sat out the 2 previous hands (i.e., a team cannot sit out 3 hands in a row)
- If their score is 3, 2, or 1

If the up-card IS a club: There is no bidding; instead, the hand is played with clubs as trump. Both partnerships must play — no sitting out. Players may not call Bottoms, Ace No Face, or 4 Of A Kind misdeal. The player to the left of the dealer leads to the opening trick. The cardplay proceeds as per the rules for when there is a trump suit.

==== Cardplay ====
If the opponents elect to play the hand (not sit out), the winning bidder leads to the opening trick. A common strategy is to lead trump and begin drawing out trumps — but, by no means is this always the best strategy.

When there is a trump suit: Cardplay is the same as in Euchre & most trick-taking card games — players must follow suit if they can, any trump is stronger than any non-trump, players may trump in or discard if they cannot follow suit, the trick-winner leads to the next trick, etc.

When the hand is played at High Card: Cardplay is the same as a notrump hand in bridge — card-rank is A-K-Q-J-10-9 [no bowers], the first card led to each trick is the “trump suit” for that trick, players must follow suit if they can, the trick-winner leads to the next trick, etc.

After the 5th and final trick of the hand, the partnership’s “trick total” for that hand equals the sum of the tricks taken by each partner.

==== Set (a.k.a. Setpie) ====
A partnership are set (a.k.a. “bumped”) if either of the following occurs:

- The partnership take zero tricks during the hand
- As bidders, the partnership’s trick total is lower than their bid (e.g., they bid 4 but only took 3 tricks)

In the event of a set (a.k.a. a “setpie”), the partnership’s score is increased by 5, up to a maximum of 20. Furthermore, there may be betting consequences associated with a set — this depends on the stakes of the particular game in question.

==== Scoring ====
The game begins with both partnerships at 15. The score is updated after each hand.

If the defenders’ trick-total is 1 or greater, their trick total is subtracted from their score. If the defenders’ trick-total is zero, they are “set”, and 5 points are added to their score, up to a maximum score of 20.

If the bidders made their bid, their trick total is subtracted from their score. For example, if a team bids 2 and ends up taking 4 tricks, then 4 is subtracted from their score.

If the bidders took fewer tricks than their bid, they are set, and 5 points are added to their score, up to a maximum of 20.

If the up-card was a club, and one partnership take all 5 tricks, then 5 points are subtracted from that partnership’s score — meanwhile, the other team is set, and 5 points are added to their score, up to a maximum of 20 points.

==== Winning ====
The winning side is the first partnership who achieve a score of zero (or negative).

If both partnerships reach zero on the same hand, then “bidder wins” — i.e., the win goes to whichever partnership were the bidders on the final hand. Thus, the winners are not always the team with the lowest score: For example, if the score were 2-1, and the team with 2 were to bid & make 2, the official score after the hand would be zero to negative-2 — however, because “bidder wins”, the team with zero would win the game.

If both partnerships reach zero on the same hand AND the final hand is played with a club as the up-card (i.e., no official bidder), then the winners are the team with the lower score after the hand. If the scores are tied after the hand, then the winners are the team with the higher trick-total on the final hand.

==== Bottoms ====
(NOTE: Disallowed if the up-card is a Club.)

If a player’s hand contains 3 cards of the same rank (e.g., three 9’s), the player may call “Bottoms”. Then, the player exchanges their 3 of a kind for the 3 cards on the bottom of the pile. The 3 of a kind are shown face-up, for all to see; and then they are placed face-up beneath the up-card.

The player must call Bottoms before he bids/passes. Additionally, the “official” rule is that a player must call Bottoms before anybody else bids/passes — at the table, however, this rule is often loosened to allow judgment calls.

For example, if the player to the left of the dealer were to bid quickly, before the next player had even picked up his hand, and then the player in 2nd seat were to call Bottoms, it may be allowed. As with many/most borderline situations in Clubs, close calls are left to the discretion of the players at the table and any respected observers on hand.

==== Misdeal ====
In the situation of a misdeal, all cards are returned to the dealer, and the dealer shuffles & deals again. Besides the usual misdeal situations (cards dealt out of order, not all players received 5 cards, upturned card during the deal, missing cards, etc.), there are two special situations where a misdeal may occur:

4 Of A Kind (misdeal): If a player’s hand contains 4 of a kind (e.g., four 9’s), the player may call “misdeal”. The official timing-rules are the same as for Bottoms (i.e., must be called before anybody has bid/passed.) If the up-card is a club, then 4 Of A Kind misdeal is disallowed.

Ace No Face (misdeal): If a player’s hand contains 1+ aces and no face-cards, the player may call “Ace No Face”. This triggers a misdeal. The official timing-rules for Ace No Face are the same as for Bottoms. If the up-card is a club, then Ace No Face is disallowed.

Rules around Ace No Face vary from game to game, and they are perhaps the most hotly debated subject on the E.C. Clubs circuit. Often, they depend on the particular geographic location of where the game is played — some places commonly restrict Ace No Face to only the precise holding of A-10-10-9-9 (exactly one ace and no opportunity to call Bottoms); by contrast, other locales allow players to call Ace No Face on any hand with no face cards.

The player's hand may afford the option to call either misdeal or Bottoms -- in this case, the decision is left to the player, who may elect to kill the hand then & there (via misdeal) or test Lady Luck by calling Bottoms.

== Double Deck Bid Euchre ==
Another variation, Double Deck Bid Euchre, uses a 48-card deck, giving 12 cards to each player. There are two teams of two players each. The minimum bid is three, and the winning bid is the highest bid, and they get to make trump. If the player makes the bid, they get one point for each trick the team takes. If the team with the highest bid fails to make their bid, they lose points equal to their bid. Their opponents get one point for each trick they take. The game is won by the first team to score 50 points.

=== Variations ===
- Indiana Double Deck: This version of Double Deck Bid Euchre is commonly played in the Midwest United States, played by four players in teams of two. A deck of 48 cards (a Pinochle Deck is used.
- Five-handed: A five-handed variation with two decks with nines removed. Each player competes against all the others. This variation can also be played by six, seven or more players, following the same rules. For each player above five, eight cards must be added to the deck. If six play, eight nines are added, four from each of the two decks; for seven players, add the nines and eights from both decks. Eeach player receives eight cards.

=== Double Hasenpfeffer ===
A variant for either four or six players divided into two teams and using the 48-card pinochle pack. Double Hasenpfeffer (or sometimes, Double Pepper), may be played without bauers, so all cards rank A K Q J 10 9 in each suit, and there are no bids of little or big pepper. All cards are dealt out and bidding goes around the table once. The minimum bid is six. If all pass, the dealer names trump at a minimum bid of six tricks. In a four-player game, a high bidder may opt to play alone and exchange any two cards with his or her partner and then play solo against the opposing team. Scoring is the same as in 24-card pepper above, with a forced declaration by the dealer losing only half (rounding up) if not made. Playing alone scores double, positive if bid is made, or negative if not.

== See also ==
- 500
- Loo
- Nap
