= 500 (card game) =

Trick-taking card game

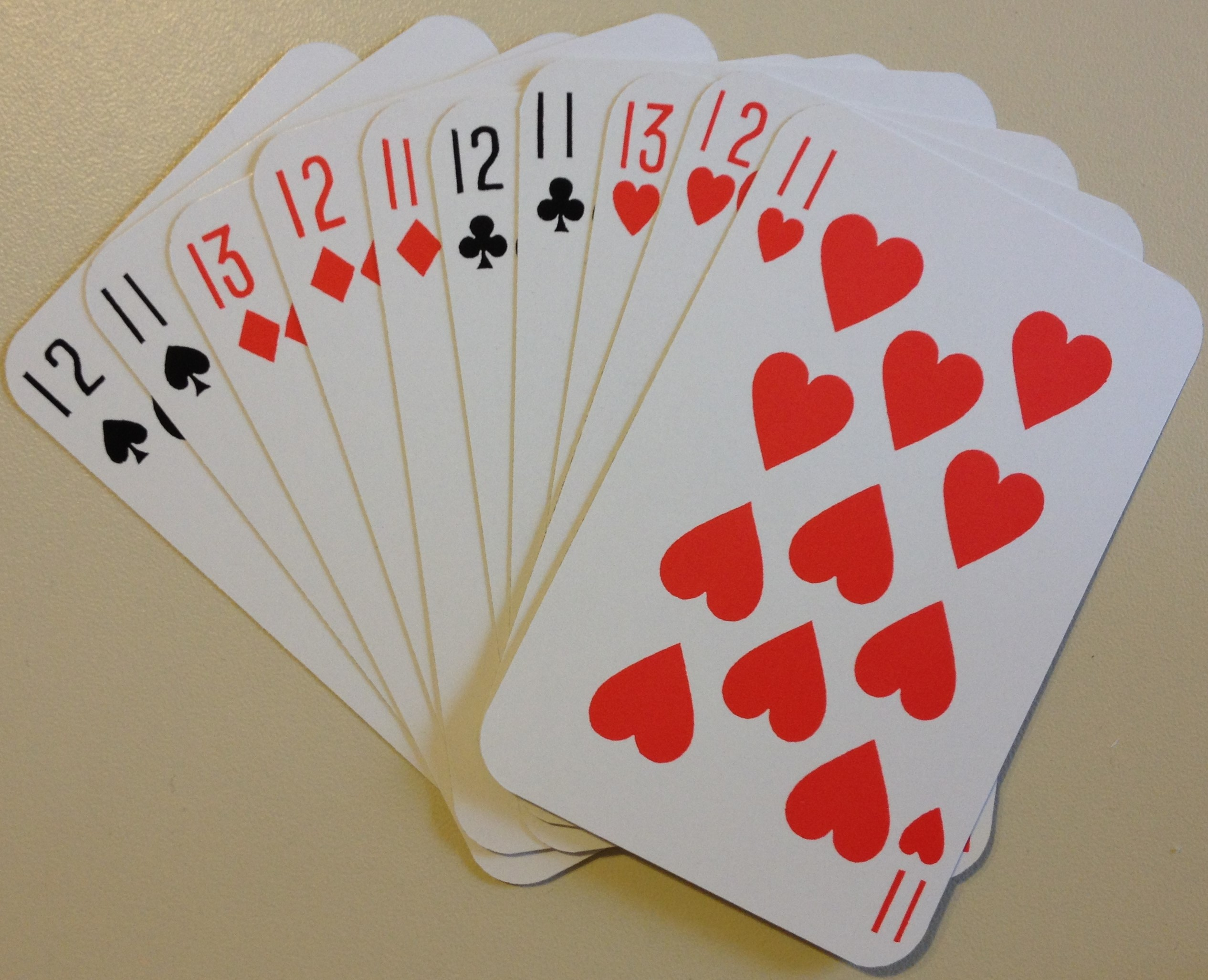
- Extra cards for 6 players
- Origin: United States
- Alternative names: Five Hundred
- Type: Trick-taking
- Players: 2–6
- Skills: Memory, Tactics
- Cards: 33–63
- Deck: French
- Rank (high→low): Trump suit: Joker J J A K Q (13) (12) (11) 10 9 8 7 6 5 4 (3) (2); Other: Joker A K Q (J) (13) (12) (11) 10 9 8 7 6 5 4 (3) (2)
- Play: Clockwise
- Playing time: 30 minutes
- Chance: Medium

Related games
- Euchre, Bridge

500 or Five Hundred is a trick-taking game developed in the United States from euchre. Euchre was extended to a 10 card game with bidding and a misère contract similar to Russian preference, although preference or prefens was not published in the US until Holye 1909. It also derived in a four-player game played in partnerships like whist which is the most popular modern form, although with special packs it can be played by up to six players.

It arose in America before 1900 and was promoted by the US Playing Card Company, who copyrighted and marketed a deck with a set of rules in 1904. The US Playing Card Company released the improved Avondale scoring table to remove bidding irregularities in 1906. 500 is a social card game and was highly popular in the United States until around 1920 when first auction bridge and then contract bridge drove it from favour. It continues to be popular in Ohio and Pennsylvania, where it has been taught through six generations community-wide, and in other countries: Australia, New Zealand, Canada (especially Ontario and Quebec) and Shetland. Despite its American origin, 500 is considered to be popular in Australia.

== Setup ==
Of the many variants to 500, the standard deck contains 43 playing cards: a joker is included (sometimes two, in which case the black joker beats the red one), and the 2s, 3s, and two 4s are removed. Either the two black 4s are removed, or the 4 of spades and 4 of diamonds are removed, in which case the 4 that matches the trump colour is also considered trump, so that there are always 13 trump cards (14 when using two jokers). Cards are dealt to each of the four players and three (four with two jokers) are dealt face down on the table to form the kitty (also known as the widow, the blind or the hole card). Alternatively, a 45-card deck can be used (46 with two jokers), in which case the 4s are not removed. Each player still receives a hand of 10 cards, but the kitty is increased to five cards (six with two jokers).

Players play in pairs, usually opposite each other. Traditionally, a bundle of three cards is dealt to each player, one to the kitty, a bundle of four to each player, one to the kitty, a bundle of three to each player, one to the kitty or with a 45-card deck: the deal is performed by dealing three cards to each player, then placing three cards in the kitty, four cards each and two to the kitty, and then three. In some versions, if a player does not receive a face card this is considered a misdeal and a redeal may be required.

As in euchre, in non-trump suits, the order of cards from highest to lowest is

ace, king, queen, (jack), 10, 9, 8, 7, 6, 5, (4).

In the trump suit, the order is (from the highest):

joker, the jack of trumps, the jack of the same color, ace, king, queen, 10, 9,..., 5, (4).

For instance if diamonds are trumps then the order in diamonds is following (from the highest):

joker, ♦J, ♥J, A, K, Q, 10, 9,..., 4.

The jack of the trump suit is called right bower. The jack of the suit of the same colour as the trump suit is called left bower' and is considered part of the trump suit. The joker is sometimes known as best bower in reference to the trump jacks.

Bower is an Anglicization of the German Bauer, a word meaning farmer, peasant, or pawn.

== Bidding ==
After the deal, players call in turn, electing either to bid or to pass. A bid indicates the combined number of tricks the bidder believes they and their partner will take and the suit that will be trump for that hand, or that there will be no trump suit. For instance, a bid of "seven spades" (7♠) indicates that the player intends to win seven or more tricks with spades being the trump suit, whereas a bid of "seven no-trump" (7NT) indicates that the player intends to win seven or more tricks with no trump suit (in which case the only trump card is the joker).

Auction commences at the level of 6. A player may elect not to bid, or to "pass". Bidding proceeds clockwise around the table, with each player passing or making a higher-scoring bid. A player who passes cannot subsequently make a bid in that hand.

A player who has bid may only bid again in that hand if there has been an intervening bid by another player. However, in some variations a player who has bid and not passed may always bid again in that hand.

The order of seniority of suits in bidding (from lowest to highest, as reflected in the scores below) is as follows:

♠, ♣, ♦, ♥, no trump.

Therefore, for example, a player who bids 7♣ may be outbid by a subsequent bidding player on 7♦ or 7♥, but not seven spades. A "no-trump" bid beats any suited bid of the same number. Eventually, all but one player passes and the bid is decided.

In American play, there is only one round of bidding, with each player getting one chance, in turn, to either bid or pass. Moreover, in American play, a bid of six is called an "inkle". A player who bids "inkle spades" is typically indicating to their partner that they have some spades but not enough to bid seven. In most versions, one cannot win auction with an inkle. If auction doesn't reach the level of 7, cards are reshuffled. Only the first two players may inkle.

If nobody makes a bid, there are multiple variations. Most commonly, the hand is declared dead and a reshuffle and redeal is made. This can be repeated only twice, after which the deal passes to the next player. Alternatively, the game is played where no bids mean the round is played as no-trump, and scoring is ten points per trick. Other variations include that the deal passes to the next player (no reshuffle); or that if no one else makes a bid, the dealer is required to make a bid.

The player making the successful bid then collects the kitty. This player sorts through their hand and discards the least-useful three (or five in the case of a 45-card deck) cards (possibly including cards picked up from the kitty), and places them face down; the discarded cards playing no further part in the hand.

=== Misère and open misère ===
Misère and open misère are two special contracts in 500. A Misère (also called Nullo (sometimes pronounced Nello) or similarly) bid means the bidding player is trying to not win any tricks. If playing with a partner, the partner folds their cards and does not participate in the round. Misère is the French word meaning "extreme poverty". Misère is worth 250 pts. and is usually placed between 8♠ and 8♣ in bidding. It can be bid when auction reaches the level 7.

Open Misère is the same as misère except the player playing this bid must reveal all of their cards to their opponents after the first trick. Also called Lay Down Misère. It is usually worth 500 and placed between 10♦ and 10♥. May be bid at any time even as the first bid.

Value and precedence of open misère can vary. It can, for instance, also be worth 330 and placed between 8NT and 9♠.

=== Non-standard bids ===
- J5 is a special version of no-trump where a jack replaces the ace as the highest card of its respective suit, keeping the rules in line with a suited game. The joker remains the only trump card, and the normal agreed-upon rules of its use still apply. In a J5 game there is no lower bower (e.g., the jack of diamonds is not considered a heart and so on). Other cards follow their typical hierarchy.
- Blind Misère is the same as misère except the bid must be called before the player views their cards.
- Double nullo is an American variant in which both players of the bidding team play and must not win any tricks. This is also called Grand nullo, which is often corrupted to Granola. Double nullo may be called by one partner even if the other partner passes. In this instance the player who calls nullo draws in their partner and both must play and not take any tricks. The person who calls double nullo picks up the kitty and gives the five cards they want to discard to their partner. Their partner then must take those five cards and pick the ones they want to keep and discard the rest.
- Grand nullo is sometimes played as a different bid from Double nullo, in which case it is identical to normal nullo except for the bidder does not get access to the kitty.
- Shields Double is a variant of Double nullo where one partner of the bidding team plays their hand open (after the initial trick).
- Patastrophe is an Open Misère where both partners on the bidding team play, with both calling partners playing their hand open (after the first trick). Patastrophe is worth 1000 points.
- The Wilkinson version of Misère is agreed to before the outset of the game, and is bid as such: 'closed misère' can be bid any time (even as a first bid) but is played open, and 'open misère' may also be bid likewise but is played open and without the kitty.
- Hi/Lo or 5 and 5 bid means one player intends to win 5 tricks and lose 5 tricks in the hand. The game is typically worth 350 points, and therefore outbids a 9♠ or 9♣ bid, but not a 9♦ or 9♥. The game play is similar to a No-trump game in that the Joker is the only trump card and may only be used if the player cannot otherwise follow suit. When a Hi/Lo call is made the bidder's partner folds their cards and does not participate in the hand. This is also called Even Stevens in Australia.
- Ralphing is when a person that bids gets set by more than 3 tricks (that is a person wins the bid with 9♥ but only takes 6, or bids Nullo and takes 3 or more tricks). In the event that a person is Ralphed, they are not allowed to bid in the next hand. The name comes from a person that would repeatedly over-bid and lose dreadfully each time. The rule was instituted so others would be allowed to win bids.
- Slam: John McLeod claims there exists a variation in which the declarer, after picking up the kitty, may call for a slam hand. The partner of the player who calls for a slam passes a single card to their partner then folds their hand and does not play. The contractor who called for the slam hand must discard until they have only 10 cards remaining before starting play. The contractor must then win all ten tricks. It is worth 500 if there are trumps and 520 in no trump.

== Play ==
The game focuses on tricks. The lead starts with the player who won the bidding. Players must follow suit if they can (this includes the left bower or any other card that is considered a trump, if trump is led). If a player no longer has any cards of the suit that is led, they may play any card in their hand. After all four players have played a card, the highest trump takes the trick. If no trump is played, the highest card of the led suit wins the trick. The winner of the trick leads on the next trick. Once all ten tricks have been played, the hand is scored. The player to the left of the previous dealer deals for the next hand, so that the deal moves clockwise around the table.

=== Joker ===
The joker is always the highest card. If there are trumps, the joker is the highest trump. In no trumps (including misère) the joker can be played only when the player cannot follow suit. When leading the joker, a player can nominate it into a suit. Other players need to follow the nominated suit. The joker can be led at any time and nominated to any suit even if the player holds cards in the suit.

== Variations ==
There are variations of the rules concerning the size of deck, use of the joker, bidding after pass etc.

=== Bidding after pass ===
Some play that it is allowed to bid after pass if someone hereafter changes the suit of their bid.

=== Raising own bid by the winner ===
Some play that the winner of the auction can raise their bid. If they change their suit (or no trumps) other players are allowed to bid again. If they only raise their bid without changing the suit, other players cannot bid again. Moreover, it is a common convention that, if only one player partakes in the auction (other players pass), they cannot raise their bid.

=== Joker in no trump ===
The use of the joker in no trumps (including misère) may vary. In some versions a player may lead a trick with the joker by naming the suit to be followed, but may not name a suit to which the player has previously claimed to be void. In some variations, a player may not "renege" with the joker – that is, use it as a card of a suit in which the player has already claimed to be void (unless the joker is the only card in the player's hand). In some variations, the joker may only be played as the first or last card in a suit.

=== Walker Ultimate 500 ===
A variation in which the winning team/player must win exactly 500 points. The game is played as normal, with the additional rule that 1000 points (like negative 500 points) loses the game. "Peggings" (or "Scab Points") must be played. This variation usually (not always) results in a longer game and generates more complex bidding and play.

=== Misère ===
Local variants may exclude either open misère, misère or both.

=== French Canadian variation ===
A variation for four players using two Jokers ("bonhommes") and a standard 52-card pack stripped of 2s and 3s. The white Joker ("la blanche") is considered stronger. The players are dealt 10 cards each in batches of 3–3–4. When 3 are passed, another 3 go to the kitty ("chatte", middle of the table). There should be 6 cards in the middle after the deal. Some variations allow for the final card placed in the kitty to be turned upright for all players to see.

The attacking player takes the kitty and discards six cards of their choice, and no other player may see them. The bidding goes accordingly with the other variation, and Misère ("Nulot") may be allowed. The "petite" misère is equal to 500 points and can only be outbid by 8NT while "la grosse" or open misère is worth 1000 points and can only be outbid by 10NT (the latter is distinguished in that all cards are placed face-up on the table).

The game is played to a total of 1000 points. If a team fails to fulfil its contract, the points are added to the other team's total. Points are never subtracted.

=== Set rule ===
The game may be played with a standard variation known as setting. An opponent is set when they fail to fulfill a contract by a predetermined number of bids. The point system and scoring remain as per standard, but an opponent who is awarded the kitty and is subsequently set is not allowed to bid in the next round. Note that it is only the player awarded the kitty (not all players on the team) that is not allowed to bid in the next round. In the case of a set occurring during double misère the player who touches the kitty first is not allowed to bid in the next round.

Typically, the set occurs at one trick more than is actually necessary to break the bidding team's contract. In other words, 5 tricks in a 7-trick bid, 4 tricks in an 8-trick bid, 3 tricks in a 9-trick bid, 2 tricks in a 10-trick bid. However, for misère, open misère, and double misère a set always occurs at 3 tricks.

=== Breach rule (related to the set rule) ===
Breach indicates that a non-bidding team intends to breach the contract of a bidding team by at least one more trick than is actually necessary to break the contract. As opposed to the Setting rule, Breach must be called on a per hand basis, and does result in additional scoring. Typically, Breach is not played in a game when the setting rule is being used.

A single player from a non-bidding partnership may call to breach another team's contract after a successful bid for a seven-trick (or more) contract has been made. The breach call may be made before or after the contracting team picks up the kitty, but must be made before game play starts. Typically, a breach occurs at one trick more than is actually necessary to break the bidding team's contract. In other words, 5 tricks in a 7-trick bid, 4 tricks in an 8-trick bid, 3 tricks in a 9-trick bid, 2 tricks in a 10-trick bid. However, for misère, open misère, and double misère a breach always occurs at 3 tricks.

A breach call can result in three different scenarios:

Win/lose
If the bidding team successfully fulfills its contract, then it receives the full points of the original bid, and the team calling breach loses points.

Lose/lose
If the bidding team does not fulfill its bid, but the opposing team does not take the necessary number of tricks to perform a breach, then the bidding team loses the point value of the original bid, and the team calling breach loses the predetermined value of the breach call.

Lose/win
If the bidding team loses its bid by the pre-established number of tricks, then the bidding team loses the contract points, and the team calling breach gains the predetermined value of the breach call.

Because breach is not considered an actual bid, a team may not win or lose (“go out the back door”) based on points gained or lost from a breach call.

A player who calls breach but does not fulfill the conditions of breach (win/lose or lose/lose scenario) is not allowed to bid in the next round. A player who bids a seven-trick contract but is successfully breached by an opponent (lose/win scenario) is not allowed to bid in the next round.

=== Point spread rule ===
A variation on the score keeping, the point-spread rule ends the game when one team has a negative score and the other team has a positive score, which results in a point spread of 500 or more points.

== Versions for 2–6 players ==
Variations exist, with appropriate additions or deductions to the deck for playing three, five or six-handed 500. Three-handed uses no teams, five-handed teams rotate and each player takes a turn without a partner, six-handed can be played as either three teams of two or two teams of three. Six-handed 500 requires a special deck with 63 cards.

=== Two-handed 500 ===
Two-handed 500 is played with a deck of 43 cards as per the standard game. Whereas in the standard game which includes partners, in the Two-handed game each player plays both the hand that is dealt to them and their partner's which is dealt to the table. The deal is the same as the standard game, except that the partners hands are dealt to the table so that they have 5 cards face down, each covered by a face up card (to give a total of 10 cards). Bidding is the same as the standard game except Misère is generally not allowed. The kitty is used with the player's hand only and no cards can be swapped between the hands. Order of play is as per the standard game. After each trick any exposed face down cards from the partner's hands are turned up and revealed. Play then continues with the lead from the hand that won the last trick.

Alternatively, the game can be played as per three-handed but with a "dead hand".

An alternative version is played with the standard 52 card deck. Each player is dealt ten cards and then 8 more cards are exposed on the table. Each player chooses one of these cards to be added to the kitty. No dummies are used and the bidding is standard. After the bid is won the defending player adds one of the remaining exposed cards to their hand and discards an unwanted card. The remaining exposed cards are added to the dead card pile.

One additional variant is to use a standard game deck of 45 (or 43) cards and have players alternate in drawing cards from the central deck. The kitty is set aside in advance, and in turn, players draw a card, choose to keep or discard it, and then either discard or keep the next card, taking the opposite action as with the previous card.

=== Three-handed 500 ===
Three-handed 500 is played with a deck of 33 cards (a joker plus a "Piquet pack", i.e. 2s, 3s, 4s, 5s and 6s removed from the standard 52 cards). Dealing, scoring and game play are as for the standard game. The common variant is in bidding, where misère may be bid before a bid for seven tricks. This variant is permitted due to the relative rarity of seven-trick bids outside of team play. Open misère may be bid in a similar fashion. Alternatively, the game may be played with the standard deck (45 or 43 cards) with one hand dealt face down, which remains untouched during the game (a so-called "dead hand"). The common strategy is that the two players who are unsuccessful in bidding form a temporary alliance in an attempt to force the other player to lose their bid.

=== Five-handed 500 ===
Another variation allows five players to play. All of the cards in a deck are used (although only one joker) so that each player can be dealt ten cards. The bidding starts to the dealer's left, and works by the same system as normal 500. The player who wins the bidding may then choose to "go it alone" (go on his/her own – without a partner for this hand) or gets to choose a card (in some versions the joker cannot be chosen) to select a partner. One of the bowers is usually chosen, or another high card; however, some variants prevent any trump card from being called. There are two versions of this variation. In one, the player who owns the chosen card announces that they have it, and then becomes the bidder's partner for that round. In the other, even the player winning the bidding will not know who the partner is until the chosen card is played (although the card chosen could be a card the bidder themselves has, that is they effectively selected no partner). Note that the partnership will usually change for each round. The remaining three players then play against the partnership. The player who won the bid gets to play the first card.

Scoring for this variation uses the same values as normal 500. If the partnership wins the required number of tricks, they will both get points (full points each or half points each, depending on the variation), and if they don't, they will both lose points (either full or half). If one of the three remaining players wins a trick, that player will receive ten points. Neither misère nor open misère is usually permitted in this variant since it is too easy to win. Because the partnership changes each round, there are no fixed teams and each player plays for themselves. This adds dynamic, and new strategies will arise.

=== Six-handed 500 ===
Special decks of cards were created by the United States Playing Card Company for playing six-handed 500, using a total of 63 cards. Besides using all 52 cards of the standard poker deck, plus one joker, these sets include 11s, 12s, and red 13s (a variation of their 61-card packs, with no red 13-spot cards, patented in 1881, that had been sold with rules for a forerunner of 500, and updated in 1897 to include red 13s). Each player receives 10 cards, and the kitty receives 3. Players seated in alternating positions around the table form two teams of three players each (or three teams of two, in "Cut Throat Six-Handed" 500). These decks are also made by Queen’s Slipper, Piatnik, and Cartamundi. A variation is to use two jokers, the black-and-white one ranking highest.

== Score keeping ==
The goal is for the team who wins the bid to take at least as many tricks as they bid. If the high bid is 8♥, then the team wins the hand if they take 8, 9, or all 10 tricks and are awarded points according to the table below. There are no bonuses for overtricks (tricks over the number bid) in the original rules. If they do not make their bid, the same number of points is subtracted from their score. Whether or not the bid winning team achieves its bid, the opposing team receives 10 points for each trick they take. A team wins the game by scoring at least 500 points; if two teams score 500 or more in the same hand, one by winning their contracted bid and the opponent by winning some tricks, only the team winning the bid wins the game ("goes out the front door"), although some Australian versions (see below) hold that winning the game at any time requires winning a bid. The original (copyrighted 1904) rules, by the U.S. Playing Card Co., state "If any player scores out during play of a hand, balance of hand is not played, unless the bidder can win out" meaning that the first player to make 500 wins, unless the bidder (also called the "maker" or "declarer") makes 500 later in the same hand. A team whose score dips to −500 points or below (referred to as "set back 500 points") loses the game. This is also known as going "out the back door" or "out backwards".

=== Avondale ===
The following table is the most commonly used "Avondale" Scoring (and bid precedence) convention}

Tricks	Spades	Clubs	Diamonds	Hearts	No Trump
6 tricks	40	60	80	100	120
7 tricks	140	160	180	200	220
8 tricks	240	260	280	300	320
9 tricks	340	360	380	400	420
10 tricks	440	460	480	500	520
Slam	250 for contract below total points of 250, normal for above 250				
Misère	250				
Open Misère	500				
Blind Misère	1000				

=== Original ===
Tricks	Spades	Clubs	Diamonds	Hearts	No Trump
6 tricks	40	80	120	160	200
7 tricks	60	120	180	240	300
8 tricks	80	160	240	320	400
9 tricks	100	200	300	400	500
10 tricks	120	240	360	480	600
Slam	250 for contract below total points of 250, normal for above 250				
Misère	250				
Open Misère	500				
Blind Misère	1000				

=== Perfect variant ===
Scoring for each family of tricks is reduced by 20 points (see table below), causing 10NT (the highest bid) to be worth exactly 500 points.

Tricks	Spades	Clubs	Diamonds	Hearts	No Trump
6 tricks	20	40	60	80	100
7 tricks	120	140	160	180	200
8 tricks	220	240	260	280	300
9 tricks	320	340	360	380	400
10 tricks	420	440	460	480	500
Misère	150				
Open Misère	250				
Hi/Lo	350				
Double Misère	450				
Patastrophe	750				
Blind Misère	1000				

=== Other scoring variations ===
These are options that may be agreed upon amongst players at the outset, or regional variations of the usually-assumed rules.

- 6-trick bids are considered inkles, raising the minimum bid to 7♠.
- If a team bids 8♠ or less, but takes all 10 tricks, they can receive 250 points; known as a "slam".
- A variation (common in Australia) is to require a team to win the game by scoring at least 500 points through winning bids, which means that any team surpassing 500 points solely with tricks has not yet won the game; the game would continue until a team wins through winning a bid.
- The game can be played with the removal of the trick points, thus only winning bids score points.
- If two or more teams pass 500 points on the same hand, a non-standard variation is to give the game to the one with the highest points.
- A team whose score dips below −500 points loses the game only if the other team is not in the negative.
- In an unrestricted bidding game, there are no limitations on which hands can be called when, such as only allowing a Misère call after a bid of 7 has already been made. Instead, each subsequent player need only be able to outbid the current highest bid (or pass).
- Some informal games allow the bidder to lay down several cards at once when they know they will win the tricks, but some rules penalise such actions with 100 points.
- According to the rules supplied with most Australian 500-specific playing card decks, 6♠ is scored as 40 points, 6♣ as 60 points, increasing by 20 points each bid in this fashion to 120 points for 6NT all the way through to 520 points for 10NT. However, Open Misère, also scoring 520 points, is ranked as the highest bid. Additionally, Misère is deemed to outrank a 7 bid but not an 8 bid.
- Split the colours In this scoring variation Misère outbids 7♠/7♣, but not 7♦/7♥; Open Misère outbids 8♠/8♣, but not 8♦/8♥; Hi/Lo outbids 9♠/9♣, but not 9♦/9♥; and Double Misère outbids 10♠/10♣, but not 10♦/10♥ (shown in table below).

== Bidding conventions ==
Similarly to bridge there are possible bidding conventions in 500. It is considered standard to bid 6NT whenever one holds the joker. John McLeod states it is allowed in Saint Paul, Minnesota to bid "no trumps" (for instance 6 no trumps) if one holds strong cards and "no" (for instance 6 no) when one holds the joker or two jacks of opposite colors (red and black). Two jacks of opposite colors ensure that the partnership will hold one of the three highest trumps regardless of suit chosen.

It is standard to open 6 in a suit with good suit and 7 or 8 with better hand. Some propose that opening 6 should indicate an ace or king in the suit and that rebid should indicate good suit for play. Openings 6♠/♣/♦/♥ can be bluffs in order to bid misère when auction reaches the level 7.

Bryce Francis, who authored a book on 500, proposed a very advanced bidding system for more elaborate version of 500 with bidding after pass and raising the bid by the winner allowed. In his system opening 6♠ shows the ace of spades. 6♣ shows the ace of clubs and lack of the ace of spades etc. 6NT shows the joker but lack of aces. Openings 7♠/♣/♦/♥ show good suit but lack of aces and the joker. Opening 7NT shows strong hand but lack of aces and the joker (for instance 4 kings).

The responder shows aces as well. To show a good suit which hasn't been bid one needs to jump bid it. For instance

6♥ – ?

6NT – joker,
7♠ – the ace of spades but lack of the joker,
7♣ – the ace of clubs but lack of the joker and the ace of spades,
7♦ – the ace of diamonds, but lack of the joker and other aces,
7♥ – good hearts but lack of the joker and aces,
8♠ – good spades but lack of the joker and aces etc.

Showing aces can commence also after opening at the level of 7.

In the Francis' system it is also possible to show kings and even queens and jacks. Kings can be shown by bidding no trumps in the second round of auction. For instance in the following auction

Left opponent	Partner	Right opponent	Player
6♥	6NT	7♠	7♣
Pass	7♦	Pass	?

7NT now by the responder shows the king of diamonds. It is because the opponents had shown the aces of hearts and spades, partner showed the joker and the ace of diamonds. 7NT now shows the king of diamonds and potential possibility to play no trumps with diamonds as the source of tricks. 8♦ would show good diamonds but lack of the king of diamonds. 7♥ would show good hearts etc.

== Strategy ==
=== Bidding ===
Bids are typically made with the consideration that one will be receiving cards from the kitty and playing with a partner (except for misère and open misère) who hopefully will also be able to win a certain number of tricks. While the number of tricks one feel one's partner will be able to win will vary in each situation, one should bid based on that assumption and not only on the cards in one's hand.

On the other hand, it is also important to remember that one's partner will be using the same strategy in their bidding; and therefore, if one's partner bids 6♥, for example, one may not necessarily want to bid 8♥ simply because one have two cards of the proposed trump suit in one's hand.

When confronted with a hand that is more-or-less even in two different suits, it is customary to bid on the suit with a higher point value.

=== Card Counting ===
When playing with 45 cards, the deck is composed of four suits with 11 cards each, and one Joker. In a suited contract (7♥, 8♠, and so on), the trump suit will have 13 cards, the suit of the same colour will have only ten, and the two suits of opposite colour will remain at 11 cards each.

A simple strategy to bidding is to attempt to predict how the unaccounted-for trump cards (the ones one don't actually hold in one's hand) would be distributed among the remaining players, excluding the kitty, with all things being equal. In other words, if one hold seven cards of one suit it can be helpful to assume that the remaining six trump cards are distributed evenly among the remaining three players (two each and none in the kitty). Doing so can provide a basic idea of how many times one's opponents will be able to follow suit in each of the four suits.

=== Discarding the kitty ===
If one is successful at bidding a suited contract and is awarded the kitty, a basic strategy of discarding is to eliminate as many non-trump suits from one's hand as possible, thus giving the most opportunity to use trump cards. However, discarding as many suits as possible is only a basic strategy, and should be met with some qualifications.

First, in most contract bids it is beneficial to keep an ace of any non-trump suit, as with all things being equal each player will with high probability have at least two cards of any given non-trump suit, making the ace of that suit a winning card.

Second, it can also be effective in some circumstances to intentionally keep the king of a non-trump suit and a low card of the same suit (for example the ♥6 and ♥K when spades are trump) when one is unable to discard that suit entirely. The resulting strategy is to then play the low card first, with the assumption that one will lose the trick to the player holding the ace of that suit, and then when one has regained control of the table the king is played under the assumption that it will be a winning card.

=== Leading trump ===
Sometimes called flushing or bleeding trump, leading the trump suit immediately can often be (but isn't always) an effective strategy. This is typically done in the following situations.

First, when a player has an above-average number of high trump cards they may wish to flush out the missing high trump cards. For example, if a player who has bid 7♥ is left holding the red joker and ♦J ♥A ♥K ♥Q ♥4, then they have five of the six highest cards (and six total). A suitable strategy would be to start the game playing highest trump (the Joker) in an attempt to force the play of the ♥J.

An alternative, but similar, strategy in this situation would be to play the ♥Q. This alternative strategy would force the player holding the ♥J to decide between either playing the jack, or throwing away a lower trump card to intentionally lose to the queen.

== See also ==
- Euchre
- Loo
- Nap
- Pepper
