= List of cross and circle games =

Cross and circle is a board game design used for race games played throughout the world. The design of most cross and circle games involves a circle divided into four equal portions by a cross inscribed inside it; the classic example of this design is the Korean game Yut. However, the term "cross and circle" is typically widened to include boards that replace the circle with a square, and cruciform boards that collapse the circle onto the cross; all three types are topologically equivalent.

The Indian game Pachisi and its many descendants are perhaps the most well-known of all cross and circle games. Not all cross and circle games are descended from Pachisi; there are numerous examples of other similar games independently developed in other cultures.

== List of games ==
Name	Image	Place of origin	Movement	Notes
Aeroplane Chess		China	Single six-sided die	Features airplane-themed pieces rather than abstract markers.
Aggravation		United States	Single six-sided die	Trademarked; accommodates up to six players, unlike most cross and circle games.
Ashte kashte		Bengal, India	Four thrown cowry shells	Played on a seven-by-seven grid with four "resting spaces" on which pieces cannot be captured. Players may sit two of their own pieces on one square to block movement of enemy pieces.
Chaupar		India	Six thrown cowry shells, or three four-sided long dice	Played on a cross-shaped fabric board.
Coppit		Germany	Single six-sided die	Originally named Fang Den Hut, or Capture the Hat.
Cranium		United States	Single six-sided die rolled after completion of an activity	Trademarked; players travel a circuit completing various activities in order to advance.
Dayakattai		Tamil Nadu, India	Two four-sided brass long dice	The game is named after the brass long dice used to determine movement.
Headache		United States	Two standard dice within a clear plastic "pop-o-matic" dome in the center of the board.	Unlike most cross and circle games, the object is not to arrive at a "home base", but to mark all of the opponent's pieces with one's own color first.
Edris A Jin		Syria and Lebanon		Similar to pachisi
Jeu des petits chevaux		France	Single six-sided die	In English, the name translates to "the game of little horses," in reference to the game's small horse-shaped pawns.
Kimble		Finland	One standard die within a clear plastic "pop-o-matic" dome in the center of the board.	Trademarked; Finnish release of the American game Trouble There is an identical British version called 'Frustration'.
Ludo		England	Single six-sided die	Derived from the Indian game Pachisi, with simplified rules. Sold worldwide under a variety of local names.
Mensch ärgere Dich nicht		Germany	Single six-sided die	In English, the name translates to "hey, don't get angry," in reference to the fact that the game involves capturing other players' pawns.
Patolli		Mesoamerica	Five or six thrown marked black beans	Ancient Mesoamerican game played by a variety of Pre-Columbian cultures.
Pachisi		India	Six or seven thrown cowry shells	Has been played in India since at least the 16th century, and is considered the ancestor to many Western cross and circle games such as Ludo, Parcheesi, and Sorry!.
Parcheesi		United States	Two six-sided dice	Trademarked American adaptation of the Indian game Pachisi.
Parchís		Spain	Single six-sided die	Generic-name Spanish adaptation of the Indian game Pachisi.
Parqués		Colombia	Two six-sided dice	Parqués boards can be adapted to accommodate four, six, or eight players.
Sorry!		England	Cards drawn from a game-specific deck.	Trademarked; the game's title comes from the many ways in which a player can negate the progress of another, while issuing an apologetic "Sorry!"
Tock		Quebec, Canada	Cards played from a hand of standard playing cards	Some playing cards have special functions such as extra movement. Some variations include joker cards.
Trivial Pursuit		Canada	Single six-sided die	Players travel around the board answering trivia questions on six different topics, and must correctly answer one from each topic in order to make it to the centre and win the game.
Trouble		United States	One standard die within a clear plastic "pop-o-matic" dome in the center of the board.	Trademarked; sold in the UK under the name Frustration. The game's dice have Arabic numerals rather than the typical pips.
Uckers		England	Two six-sided dice	Primarily played in branches of the British Armed Forces, particularly the Royal Navy, which lays down the official game rules in its regulations.
Wahoo		Appalachia, United States	Single six-sided die	Regional variation of the traditional cross and circle game. Aggravation is a licensed version of the same game.
Yut		Korea	Four thrown marked sticks	Traditional board game associated with Korean New Year.
Zohn Ahl		Great Plains region of the United States	Four thrown marked sticks	Traditional board game of the Native American Kiowa people.

== See also ==
- List of board games
