= Mensch ärgere Dich nicht =

German board game

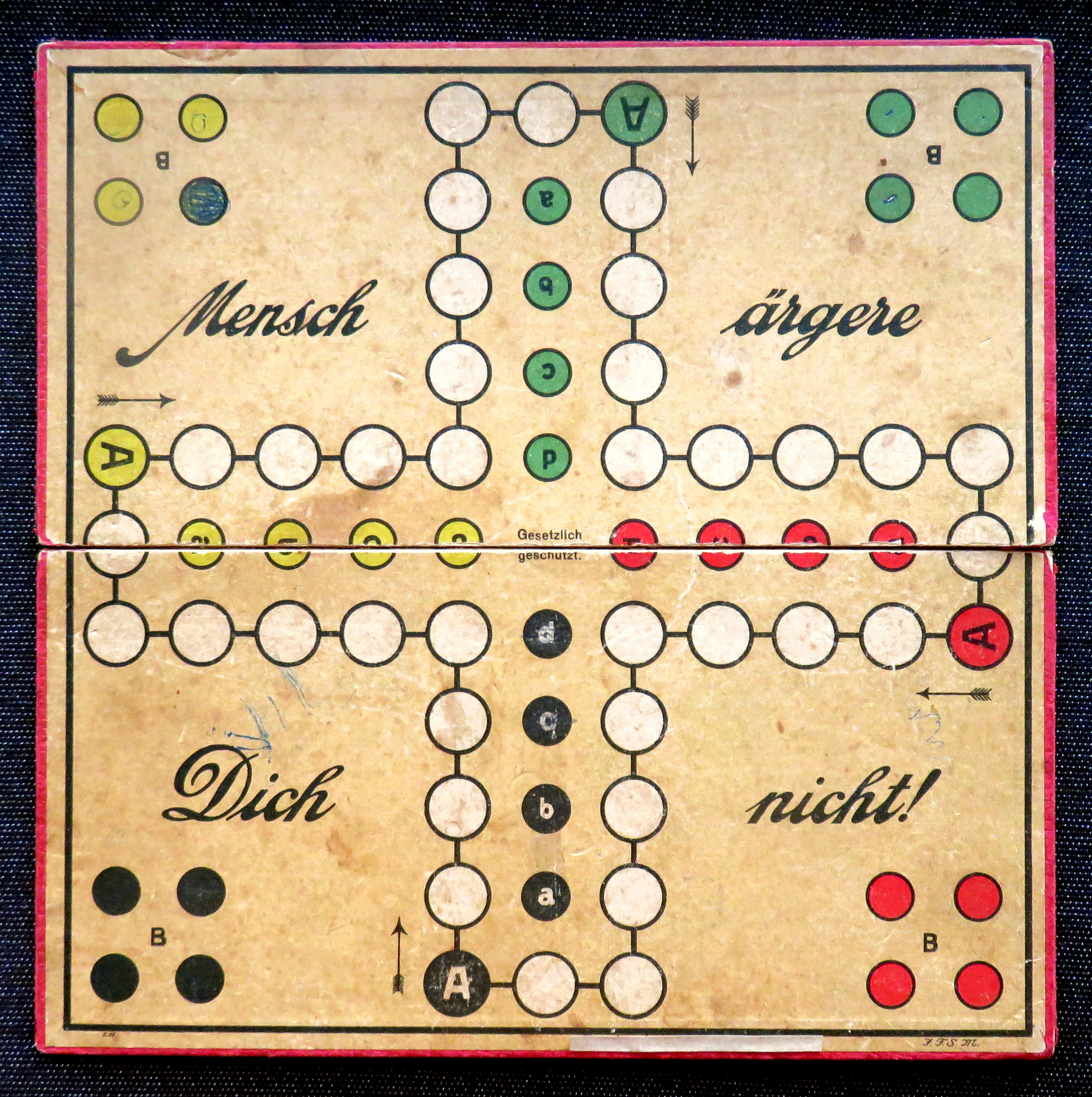
- Designers: Josef Friedrich Schmidt
- Publishers: Schmidt Spiele
- Publication: 1914; 112 years ago
- Genres: Board game
- Languages: German
- Players: 2 to 4 (2 to 6 on reverse side)
- Setup time: 1 minute
- Playing time: c. 30 minutes
- Chance: High (dice rolling)
- Age range: 6+
- Skills: Counting, probability

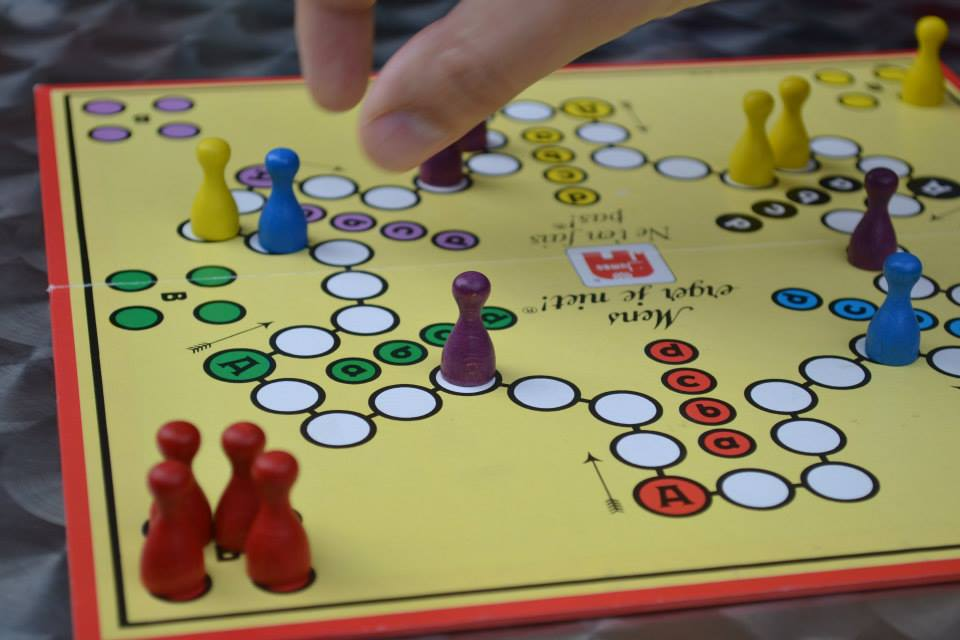
Mens erger je niet, Dutch version for 6 players

Mensch ärgere Dich nicht (English: Man, Don't Get Angry) is a German race game developed by Josef Friedrich Schmidt in 1907/1908. Some 70 million copies have been sold since its introduction in 1914 and it is played in many European countries.

The name derives from the fact that a peg is sent back to the "out" field when another peg lands on it, similar to the later game Sorry! It is a cross and circle game with the circle collapsed onto the cross, similar to the Indian game Pachisi, the Colombian game Parqués, the American games Parcheesi, Aggravation, and Trouble, the French game Jeu des petits chevaux, the Chinese Aeroplane chess and the English game Ludo.

== Overview ==
The most played variant of the game can be played by two, three or four players – one player per board side. The special one has a pattern for six players. Each player has four game pieces, which are in the "out" area when the game starts, and which must be brought into the player's "home" row.

The rows are arranged in a cross position. They are surrounded and connected with a circle of fields, over which the game pieces move in a clockwise direction. There are three fields on each side of the board. At the beginning of the game, the players' pieces are placed in the four fields marked "B" on the far left side, the "out" section. The coloured field just left of centre, marked "A", is each player's "start" field. The white field just to the right of the start field leads to the "home" row, marked "a", "b", "c", "d". Each game piece enters the circle at the "start" field ("A"), moves (clockwise) over the board and finally enters the "home" row. The first player with all of their pieces in their "home" row wins the game.

The players throw game dice in turn and can advance any of their pieces in the game by the thrown number of dots on the die.

Throwing a six means bringing a piece into the game (by placing one from the "out" ("B") area onto the "start" or "A" field) and throwing the die again. If a piece is on the "A" field and there are still pieces in the "out" area, it must be moved as soon as possible. If a piece cannot be brought into the game then any other piece in the game must be moved by the thrown number, if that is possible. A commonly played variation allows a player who has no pieces in the circle of fields to have three tries to throw a six.

Pieces can jump over other pieces and throw out pieces from other players (into that player's "out" area) if they land on them. A player cannot throw out his own pieces and cannot advance further than the last field in the "home" row. A player cannot be thrown out if he is on his "start" field. Two pegs cannot reside on the same circle. Once inside of the "home" area, pegs cannot jump over other pegs and an exact roll of the dice is required to move inside of the home area. Your peg can only move into the home of the same color. (i.e. You cannot go into somebody else's home and kick their pegs out.) A worst case scenario for entering home is depicted in the image here:

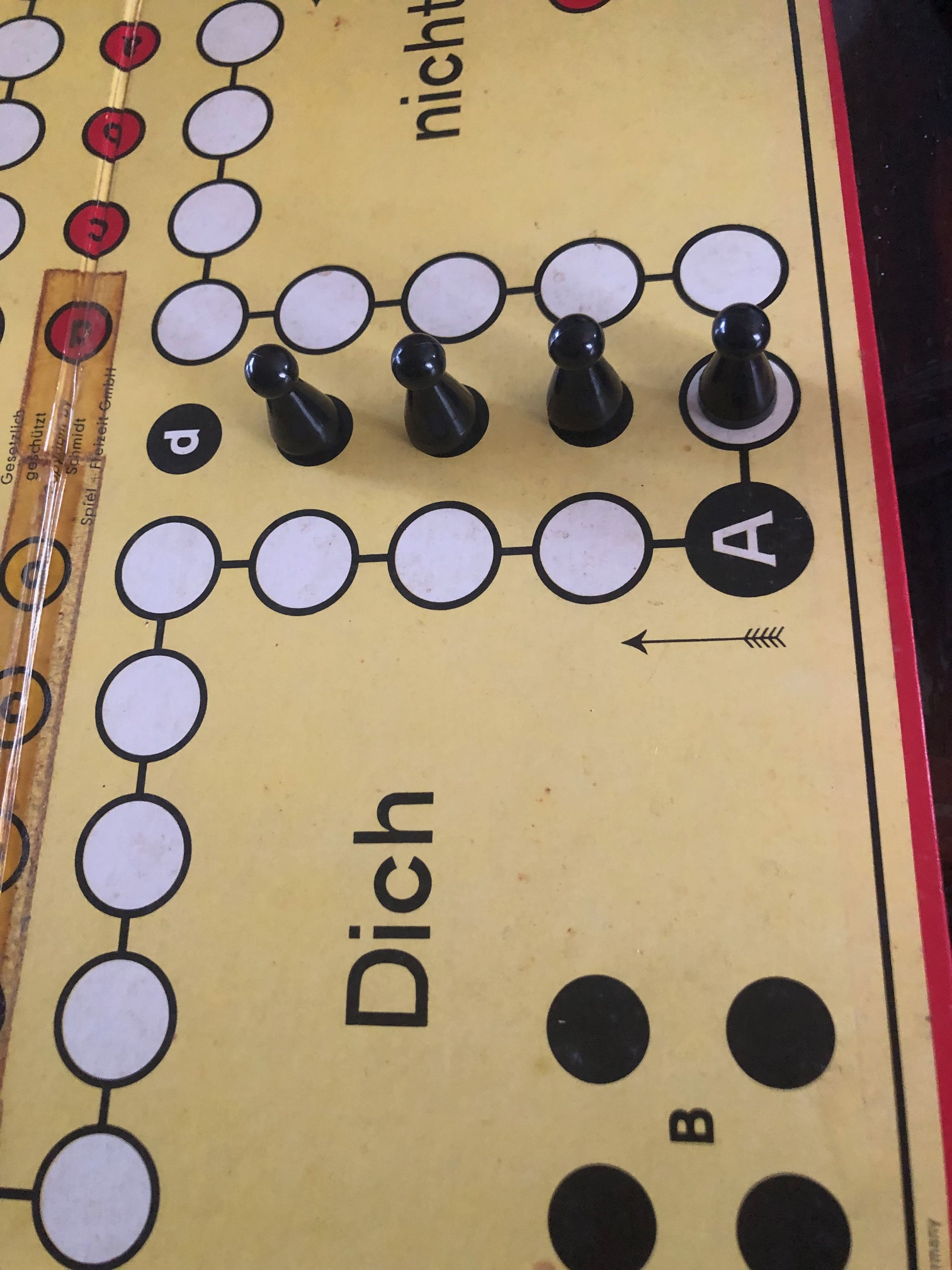
Worst case scenario entering home

It would require the person to roll 4 consecutive 1's to get all of the pieces in home before another player could kick the one peg waiting outside of home.

== History ==
=== Beginnings in the early 20th century ===
In its present form, Mensch ärgere Dich nicht was invented in the winter months of 1907/1908 by Josef Friedrich Schmidt, a native of Amberg, Germany and the founder of Schmidt Spiele. This game was invented in a workshop in Munich-Giesing and was based on the English game, Ludo. This game was first published in 1910 and was produced in series from 1914 on. Mensch ärgere Dich nicht is considered the most popular parlour game in Germany. In contrast to Ludo, the game's role model, Schmidt left aside all tactical and strategic variations in the rules. Also, the symbolism of the origin game, Pachisi, was eliminated.

The rules of this classic game have essentially not changed since 1914, but now there are different variations of the game, e.g. Nichts als Ärger and Teufelsrad. While the game was not particularly successful in the early years, it became popular during the First World War. Schmidt sent 3,000 games to field hospitals so that the soldiers had something to do to escape boredom. Thanks to this tactic and the subsequent word-of-mouth propaganda, it was possible to sell 1 million games at the price of 35 Pfennigs by 1920.

=== Developments and copies after World War II ===
After the Second World War, the game remained largely unchanged. In 1953, Schmidt Spiele introduced an official Mensch ärgere Dich nicht version as a licensed edition in East Germany. Soon after, almost identical counterfeits appeared in West Germany under the title of "Wir werfen raus!" and "Mensch wir werfen raus!". One version, "Verliere nicht den Kopf!" puts a shortcut across in the middle of the board. Its successor, "Raus!", which had a square-shaped board, was also being sold at the time. Different counterfeits appeared in other countries, such as "Das Spiel", an Austrian version of the game by the Viennese publisher Werner Schneider Jr. In addition to these games, many other promotional games appeared in the 1980s that were modeled after the original. Apart from these counterfeits, other internationally refined and independent games evolved from Mensch ärgere Dich nicht and other Pachisi spin-offs. These games include: Hexentanz, das VIP Game, Tock, its spin-off, Sorry!, Dog and DOG, as well as Huckepack. The original board game consisted of painted wooden pegs, but sometime after the 1960's, the wooden pegs were replaced with plastic colored pegs.

=== Further developments in the 21st century ===
Additionally, this board game established itself in tournament form. On 11 February 2010 the Deutsche Post issued a special 55 cent stamp to celebrate the game's 100th anniversary. In January 2014, Schmidt Spiele released a card game with the title Mensch ärgere Dich nicht: Das Kartenspiel. Schmidt's hometown Amberg set the world record for simultaneous gameplay of Mensch ärgere Dich nicht with 1692 people on 375 game-boards in July 2017.

== See also ==
- List of cross and circle games
