= Race game =

Type of board game

Race game is a large category of board games in which the object is to be the first to move all one's pieces to the end of a track. This is both the earliest type of board game known, with implements and representations dating back to at least the 3rd millennium BC in Egypt, Iraq, and Iran; and also the most widely dispersed: "all cultures that have games at all have race games". Race games often use dice to decide game options and how far to move pieces.

== Types of race games ==
Race games may be categorized by their ratio of luck to skill. Other classifications include geographical distribution or derivation; and shape of track (including spiral, cross and circle, and square—either boustrophedon as in Snakes and Ladders or "labyrinthine" as in Thaayam).

=== Simple ===
Simple race games involve pure luck. Each player has only one piece to move, and the outcome of the game thus depends solely on chance. The Game of the Goose is the progenitor of most simple Western race games, whereas Snakes and Ladders is descended from simple race games originating in the Indian subcontinent. The ancient Egyptian game Mehen was likely a simple race game.

=== Complex ===
Complex race games combine chance and strategy, but still emphasize more on the former. Each player often has more than one piece to move (typically four), and so choices of move can be made that will put a player in advantageous positions. Complex race games include those from the cross and circle game family. Many of these games, such as Ludo, Parcheesi, Trouble, Mensch ärgere Dich nicht, and Sorry!, ultimately derive from the ancient Indian games Pachisi and Chaupar.

=== Multiplex ===
Multiplex race games prioritize the role of strategy while retaining the element of chance. Each player has more than one piece to move as in complex race games, but every choice of move greatly impacts the outcome of the game. Multiplex race games include the majority of the many varieties of the tables game family, of which Backgammon is the most well-known representative. Others include Nard, Jacquet, Verquere, and Acey-deucey. (It is debatable whether Trictrac, a tables game, is even a race game at all; its scoring rules can imply a strategic race game or a non-race game.) The ancient Egyptian game Senet and the ancient Mesopotamian Royal Game of Ur were almost certainly race games, and may belong in this category.

=== Strategic ===
Strategic race games eliminate (or render trivial) the element of chance. Examples include Bantu and Hare and Tortoise. Trictrac may be considered a strategic race game, given that skill vastly outweighs chance—but if the term race game is defined such that the overriding aim is to be the first to move all one's pieces to the end of a track, rather than this being merely one way to score points among many, it may safely be altogether excluded from race games, purely on category grounds.

== Non-race games ==
Many board games share some characteristics with these games, but are not categorized as race games. For example, the characteristic roll-and-move mechanism of race games is also found in running-fight games (such as Coppit), but here the object of the game is not to finish first, it is to capture and remove enemy pieces from the board. Similarly in games as diverse as Monopoly and Trivial Pursuit, players roll-and-move to spaces which may help or hinder their progress, but there is no physical "finish line": a win is not attained positionally, but rather by the collection of assets. (Note: For example in Trivial Pursuit, while the final question, for the win, must be answered in the center space, it is not the attainment of this position, but rather the correct answer (an "asset") that wins and ends the game.)

The game of Trictrac arguably fits this category as well: the object is to score 12 holes (sets of 12 points, with a hole-doubling flag known as bredouille that may be on or off for either or neither player), with certain in-game events (known as jans) each scoring a varying amount of points. While bearing off (sortir or tirer les dames in French) scores points, it is not among the highest-scoring events in the game, and many matches end without a single piece being borne off. (The hierarchical scoring is much like Tennis or Volleyball, while the combinatorics echo American football.)

It is possible to broaden the definition of the term "race games" to comprise all board games in which the winner is the first to attain a specified position. In addition to the race games specified above, the category would then include games such as Hex, Agon, Chinese Checkers, and Tic-tac-toe. However, board game surveys generally follow Murray in assigning games played on two-dimensional fields to a separate category, such as Murray's "Games of Alignment and Configuration", keeping only linear games (as defined above) in their "race games" category.
