= Uckers =

Board game played across the military branches of Britain

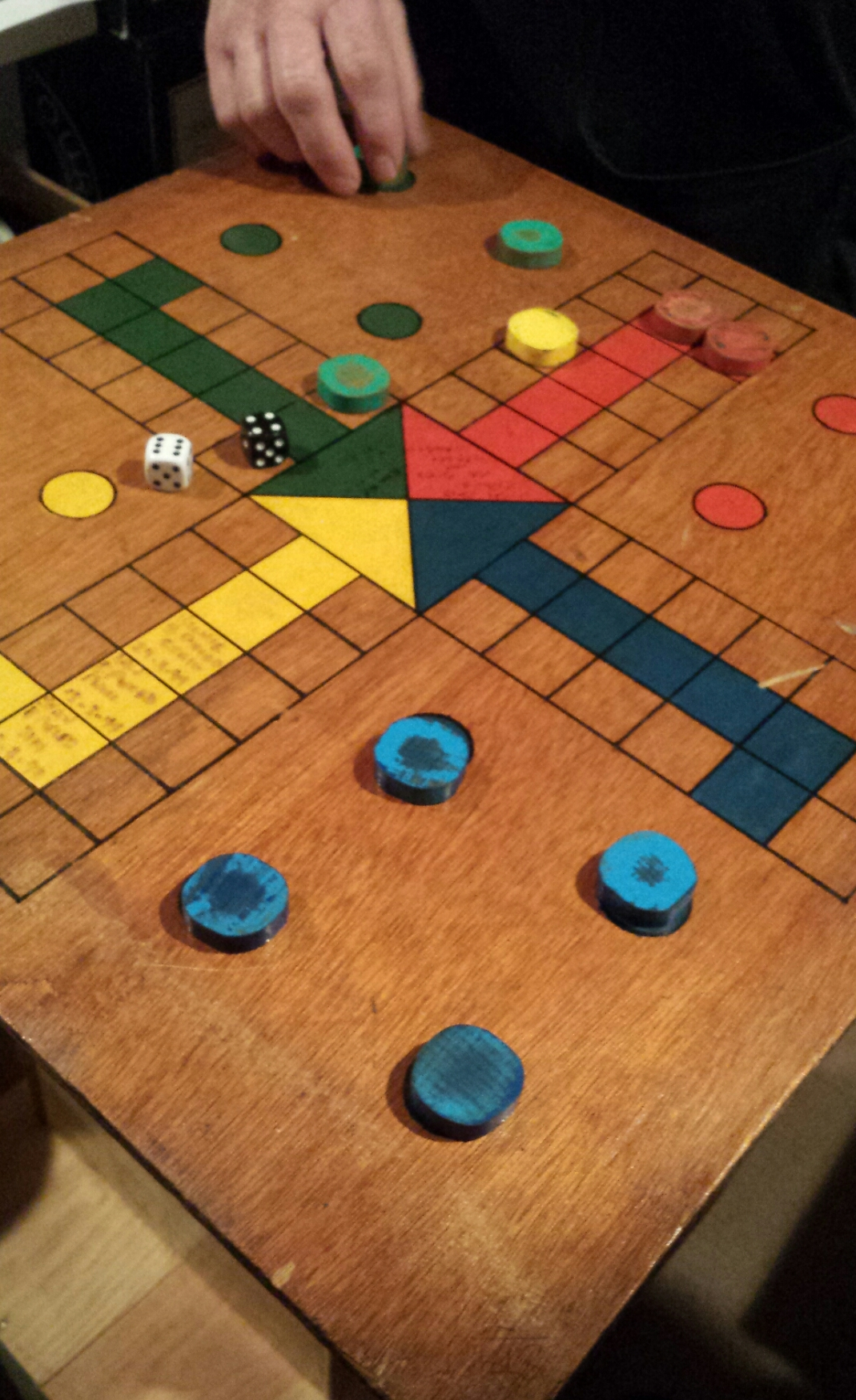
- Publication: before 1935
- Genres: cross and circle board game
- Players: 2–4
- Setup time: <1 minute
- Chance: high
- Materials required: board, counters, dice

Related games
- Pachisi

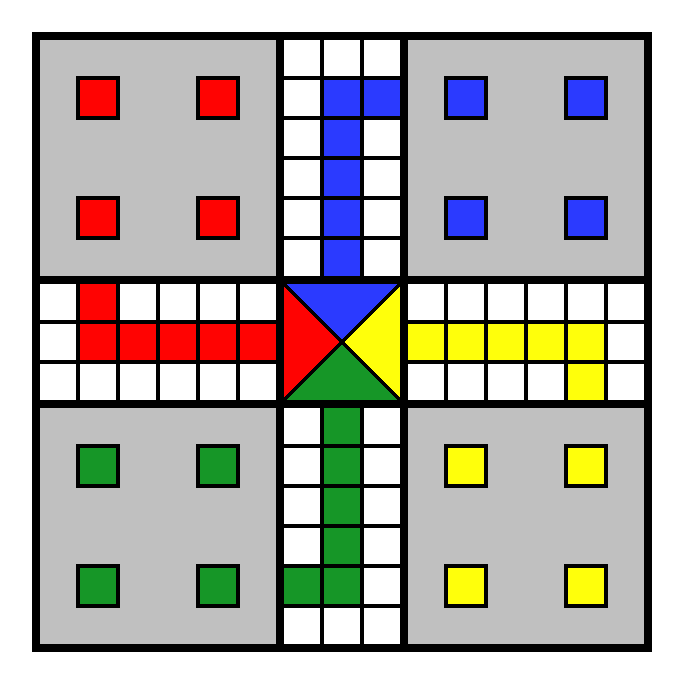
Uckers gameboard

Uckers is a board game for two to four players traditionally played in the Royal Navy. It has spread to many of the other arms of the UK Armed Forces as well, including the Commonwealth Forces. It can now commonly be found in the Royal Marines, Army Air Corps, Royal Canadian Navy, Royal New Zealand Navy, Royal Australian Navy, Royal Australian Air Force (RAAF), Royal Dutch Navy, and the Royal Air Force (RAF).

It is related to the board game Ludo, and is based on the same principles: getting four pieces around the board before the opposition. The goal of Uckers is to get all player pieces home before the opponent does. Even greater glory is attached to achieving all pieces home without the opponent getting any home at all—this is known as an 8 piecer. The ultimate win is when the player gets all their pieces home and the opponent has all their pieces still in the base—this is called an 8 piece in harbour, or an eight-piece dicking and merits the unfortunate player's name to be recorded on the reverse of the board.

== History ==
Although its first official print reference does not appear until 1937, Uckers shares some similarities with the Indian game Pachisi. A newspaper article from 1934, describing recreation on the ship HMS Sussex, refers to uckers as a "form of gigantic ludo, played with huge dice, with buckets for cups". A newspaper photo from 1937 shows sailors playing the giant-sized version on HMS Cardiff, with the caption describing the dice as a six-inch cube, shaken in a bucket, and claims that it's "a game popular in the Navy for generations." It is mentioned in a diary of EJF Records (served 1928–1950) in 1937 as Huckers.

Uckers is generally played using the rules stated below, but these will vary from one branch of the Royal Navy to another. It is also played in units of the Army Air Corps (United Kingdom) where it was introduced by aircraft technicians on loan from the Fleet Air Arm in the late 1950s and early 1960s. Uckers was also played by units in the Royal Artillery, particularly meteorologists and LifeFlight Toowoomba Rescue Helicopter crews.

== Rules ==
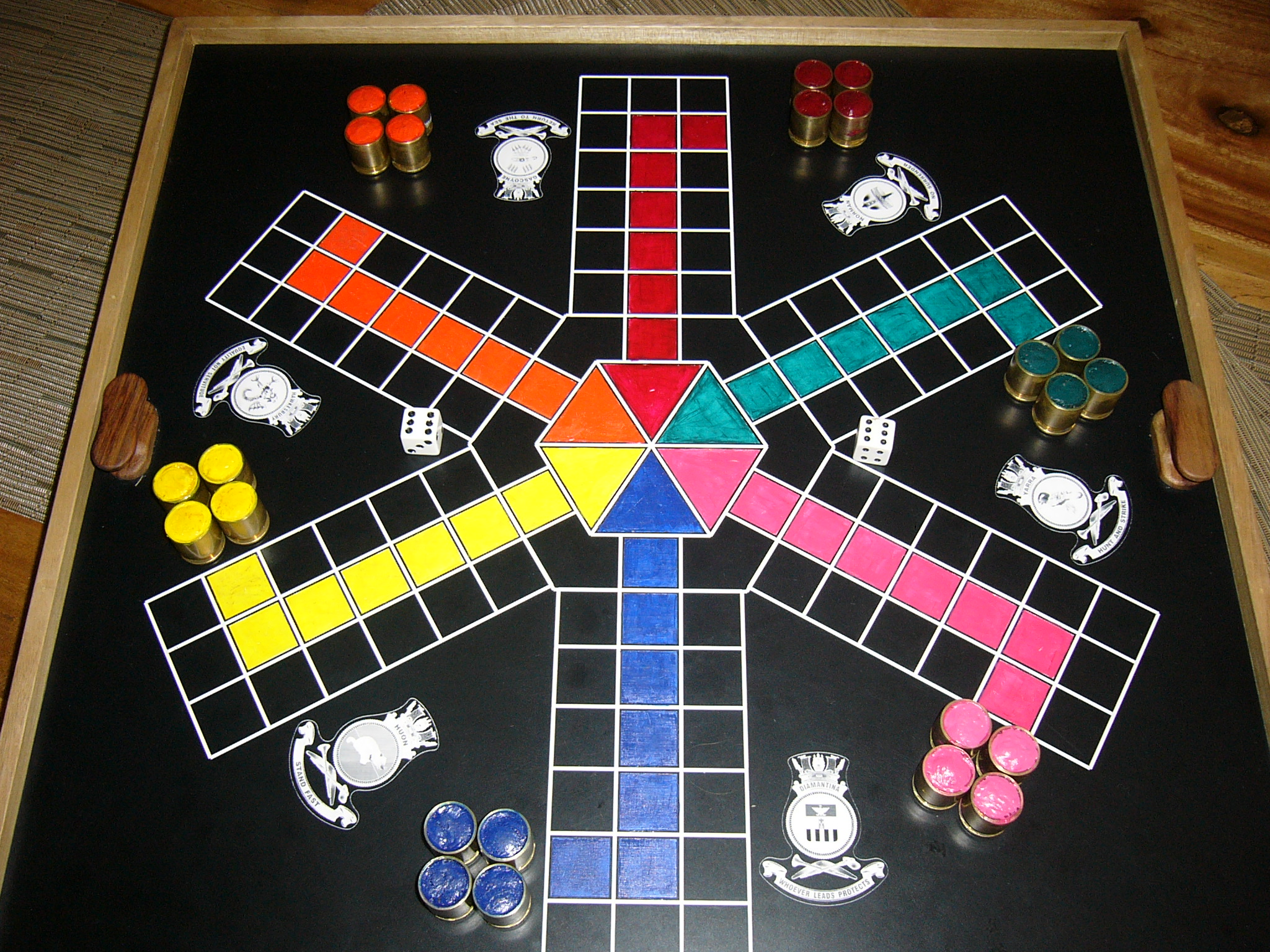
Six-sided Uckers board

Although Uckers is often played on a Ludo board a true Uckers board is a mirror image so the red and green squares are presented to the player facing them in the correct Naval manner, i.e. red to port and green to starboard.

The game is played by either two or four people, if there are two people playing then each player takes two opposite colours, yellow and red vs green and blue or on a true Uckers board, green and yellow vs red and blue. If there are four players then the players opposite each other become partners, so Yellow partners with Red, and Green partners with Blue or on a true Uckers board, green partners with yellow, and red partners with blue.

To travel around the board two dice are thrown, players moving the amount shown on the dice, a six permitting an extra turn. To see who goes first each player throws the dice and whoever throws the highest starts.

Some rules have evolved for the throwing of dice including no rolling of the dice from an open palm (Waterfall Technique), only tossing using the fingers. However, these are not used universally. If the dice leave the board, the IPS (International Playing Surface), accompanied by the call of "off the IPS" three times within the game this can be punished by losing the go up to all pieces home depending on which rules are being played. Unless the opponents deem it to have been done on purpose (for example to avoided moving a blob or mixing) then they may permit a re-roll.

No dice rigging. (No setting both sides to sixes and picking them up. Dice must be picked up as they landed during the previous throw.)

In order to exit the player's base it is necessary for a six to be thrown, which results in putting a piece on the coloured square joining the base known as the doorstep. However, if on the very first throw snake eyes (two ones) is thrown then all player (possibly partner's depending on which rules) pieces come out of the base onto the doorsteps—known as out all bits. Play then continues with the next player. If on rolling snake eyes on the first throw a player again throws snake eyes on their second throw all of their pieces return to the base.

A throw can be split up into the two separate numbers so it is possible to move two different pieces as in backgammon. However, unlike backgammon if a player is moving only a single piece, then they must move it the sum of the two dice rather than moving the value of the first die and then moving the value of the second die.

If a player's piece lands on a square with an opponent's piece, then, as in Ludo, that piece is sent back to the opponent's base.

If a piece lands on a square with a playing piece of the same colour then this is known as a blob and is basically a barrier. An opposing piece is not allowed to jump over them, but friendly pieces can. The two ways an opposing piece can get by a blob is to destroy it, or by using an adjacent friendly blob to jump over it. A player can destroy the barrier by landing on an opponent's blob with a blob of their own or to six the blob off. To do this they will need to have a playing piece adjacent to the blob and then on their turn throw X + 1 six where X = the number of playing pieces forming the blob. Note that if the blob is on its own colour doorstep, then an additional six (i.e. X + 2 sixes) must be thrown to remove the blob and exit the homebase.

If one succeeds in knocking the blob off, then the single playing piece used to attack the blob is moved to the square that the blob was on and the pieces forming the blob are returned to the base. Play then continues to the next player.

If a player's piece lands on a square with a playing piece that belongs to their partner or is their other colour, then this is called a mixi blob (or a mixed barrier). Unlike blobs, a mixi blob is equivalent to a single playing piece so the opponent can land on the square and send all the playing bits back to their relevant bases. The opponent can pass over a friendly mixi blob as it provides no barrier to movement; a blob may not be attacked by a piece from an adjacent opposing mixi blob.

As in Ludo, one does need to roll the exact number of spaces left to get home, and if a player's pieces are in the home lane then they cannot be attacked. If playing with a partner and all their pieces get home first, then they can continue rolling in the hopes of getting a six. If they do roll a six, then, on their next turn, they can then roll for and move their partner's pieces as well. However, remaining pieces cannot be moved by the partner once they are in the home lane.

A player can either move normally or attack (or six) a blob. A piece cannot be moved next to a blob and then, on the same go, attack it.

If only one die value is able to be played, the higher value must always take preference.

If a player(team) has all his pieces sent home as following the loss of an 8-piece mixi blob, he has been subject to an "8-piece dicking".

== Variant rules ==
Although not strictly required by the rules, there are several other traditions. A player purely throwing and moving his pieces to end the game without entering into the spirit of the game can be politely censured for being a "Ludo player" or heckled and embarrassed by the surrounding throng that can gather around heated games.

Cheating is not cheating unless caught, whereupon a charge of "timber shifting" (the pieces usually having been made from a cut up broom handle) can be issued, returning a piece to its rightful place. Any timber shifting call should only come from those playing. Hints from the crowd should be restricted to overly complex discussions of tactics or superfluous detail that serves only to distract.

If an 8-piece dicking is threatened, a player may resort to "upboarding" (depositing all pieces onto the floor) but he will be punished for such an action, inline with an 8-piecing, by having his name added to the reverse side of the board.

A "stand up" finish is for the more debonair player who wishes to finish in style. When requiring a number to finish that is possible from one dice throw, the player can state "stand up finish", throw his dice, and stand up and walk away from the game without looking at the resulting throw in the hope that the correct number has appeared and he has won. Failing to do so results in the player slinking back to the board to continue, accompanied by polite banter from those present.

In the event of an extended dispute over any specialised local rules one of the players can request to see the rules. Legend has it that the rules are printed on the underside of the board. The game is over as soon as the board is flipped to check the rules.

In some rulesets, throwing a double on the dice allows the player to move a blob backwards, and if he reaches the square immediately before the bottom of the chute by this method, he can then enter the chute with these pieces instead of having to travel around the board.

== Digital Uckers ==
In March 2024, Uckers International launched an app for both Android and iOS devices with the aim of making Uckers more accessible to a wider audience, making it free to download and play. The app includes popular rule variations, the introduction of game and turn timers, plus a unique scoring mechanism designed to promote competition and fast play. The launch of uckers leagues and tournaments in 2025 gives testament to the continuing growth in popularity of the game with players from over 60 countries playing through the app.

Additionally, Uckers International have created a community of players through their website where uckers-related topics are openly discussed through news articles and blobs.

== Championships ==
The World Uckers Governing body, the Royal Naval Association, held the 2021 World Championships in the HMS Victory arena in the Historic Dockyard, Portsmouth. The event was sponsored by Pusser's Rum and all championship boards were supplied by Uckers ya Uckers. Following the finals, Sara and Bob Field (known as 'The Ludo Two') were crowned as World Champions.

The 2026 Championship was held in Portsmouth on the 3rd October. The winner of the 2026 Championship Singles title was reigning champion Stan Patterson for an incredible fourth time on the trot. The 2026 Doubles Champions were the Below Deck team Brent & Jluz Latham

The 2025 Championship was held in Portsmouth on 4th October. The winner of the 2025 Champion Single title was reigning champion, Stan Patterson. The 2025 Doubles Champions were the Green Machine (Stan Patterson and Alex Cruikshanks, Royal Marine veterans) who were playing against The Matelot and his Civvy (Simon Mills and Oli Smith).

The 2024 Championship was held in Portsmouth on 12 October, at the Royal Maritime Club. The singles division resolved with Stan Patterson in first place, the runner-up being Brent Latham. The doubles tournament was won by Kath and Trevor Dean who faced off against Peter Jones and Jimmy Greene.

== See also ==
- Ludo—uses a similar gameboard
