= Edris A Jin =

Game board, as described by Culin (1898)

Edris a jin was a cross and circle game played by the Druze of Syria and Lebanon. It has been compared to Pachisi.

== Overview ==
Stewart Culin states the name, meaning "game of the Jinn", is derived in part from the prophet Enoch, identified by Muslim scholars as Idris.

The game is played on a cloth board with "a parti-colored diagram with four arms each having four rows of eight squares, each connected at the ends by a diagonal row of eight squares, the whole forming an octagonal figure." The central area of 16 squares is designated the serai. Each player has three cowrie shells as pieces, one of which is designated the "chief" and the remaining two the "soldiers"; four more cowries are thrown to determine movement, but Culin did not describe how that was determined.
