= Josef Friedrich Schmidt =

German board game inventor

- Born: 24 November 1871; Amberg, Germany
- Died: 28 September 1948 (aged 76); Munich, Germany
- Known for: Inventor of Mensch ärgere Dich nicht

Josef Friedrich Schmidt (24 November 1871 – 28 September 1948) was a German board game inventor.

Schmidt was the inventor of board game Mensch ärgere Dich nicht. He invented the game in 1907/1908. He gave his name to the board game publisher Schmidt Spiele.

== See also ==
- Schmidt Spiele
