= Ludo =

Strategy-based board game

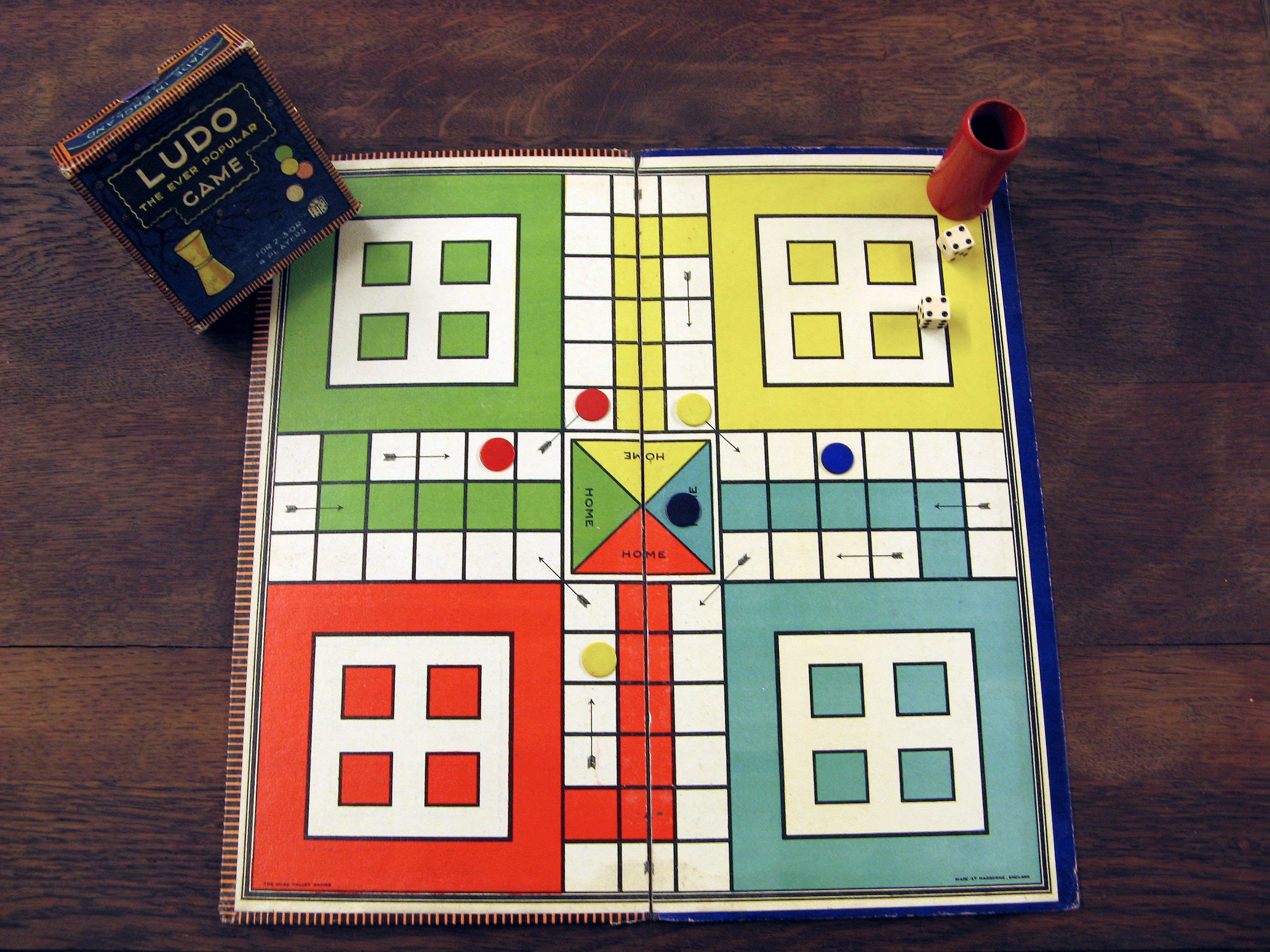
- An early commercial Ludo board by Chad Valley (mid 20th century)
- Years active: Since c. 1896
- Genres: Board game Race game Dice game
- Players: 2–4
- Playing time: < 90 min
- Chance: High (dice rolling)
- Age range: 5+
- Skills: Strategy, tactics, counting, probability

Ludo (/ˈljuːdoʊ/; from Latin ludo '[I] play') is a strategy-based board game for two to four (Note: In some countries (at least Denmark) a variant for six players is available, but it is uncommon. Also in Denmark, a 4-player variant called Partners is available, where the players compete in pairs in a Bridge-like manner.) players, in which the players race their four tokens from start to finish according to the rolls of a single die. Ludo shares characteristics with other cross-and-circle games from around the world; these types of games include the pre-Columbian Mesoamerican game Patolli, and the Indian game Pachisi. The game and its variations are popular in many countries and under various names.

== History ==
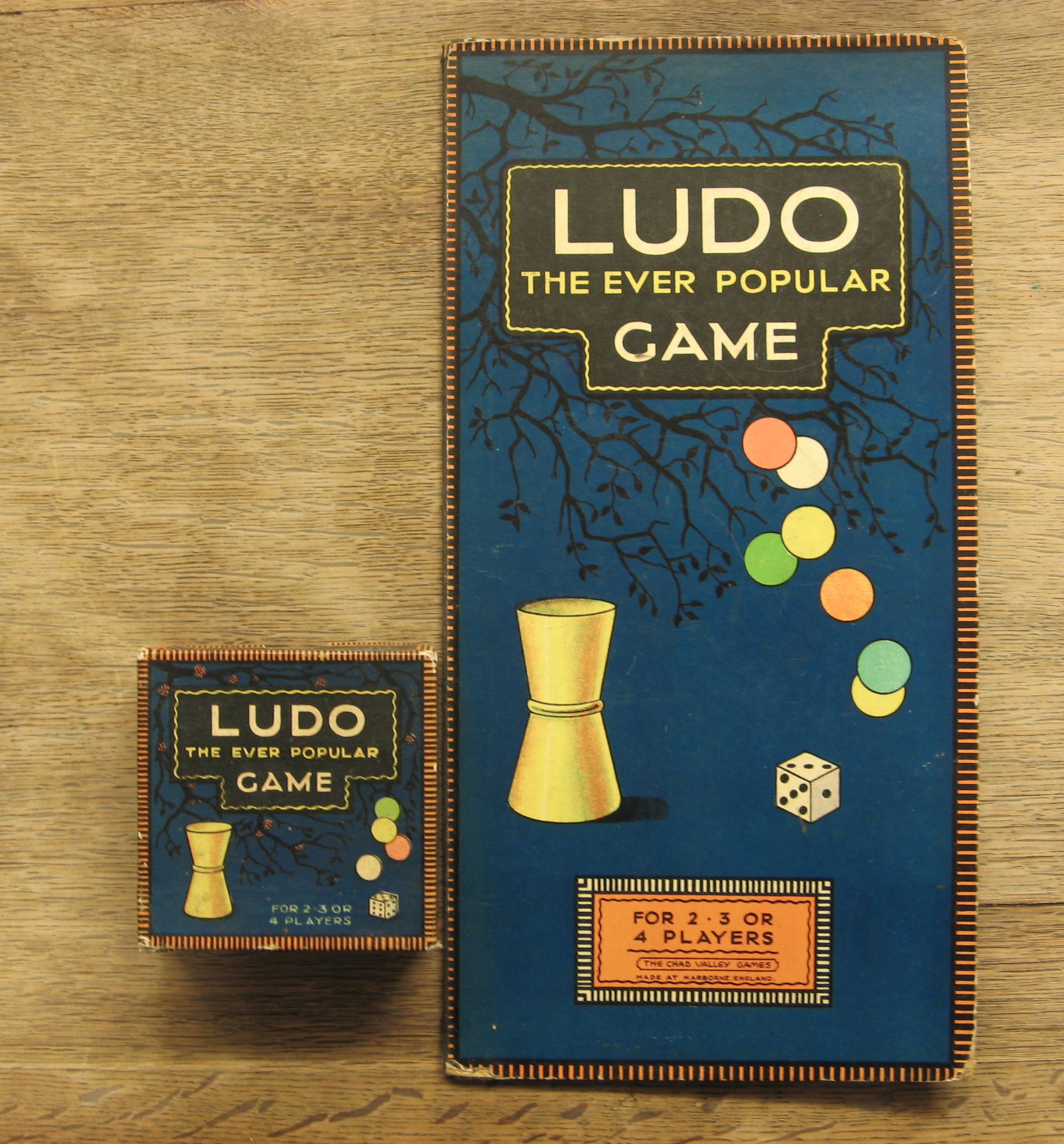
An early commercially printed edition of Ludo by Chad Valley

Ludo uses a cubic die with a dice cup and was marketed as "Ludo" in England in 1896 by Alfred Coller. (Note: Patent number 14636.) Coller eventually patented the game and sold it as "Royal Ludo". The board game Uckers, popular in the Royal Navy, is based on Ludo.

== Ludo board ==
Special areas of the Ludo board are typically coloured bright yellow, green, red, and blue. Each player is assigned a colour and has four tokens (Note: Tokens were originally flat bone discs; modern materials are cardboard or plastic.) in their colour. The board is normally square with a cross-shaped playspace, with each arm of the cross having three columns of squares, usually six per column. The middle columns usually have five squares coloured; these represent a player's home column. A sixth coloured square not on the home column is a player's starting square. At the centre of the board is a large finishing square, often composed of coloured triangles atop the players' home columns (thus depicting "arrows" pointing to the finish).

== Rules ==
=== Overview ===
Trajectory of tokens of each colour on the original Ludo board

Two, three, or four can play, without partnerships. (Note: "From two to four-play, each with four pieces, and without partnerships.") At the beginning of the game, each player's four tokens are out of play and staged in the player's yard (one of the large corner areas of the board in the player's colour). When able to, the players enter their tokens one per turn on their respective starting squares and proceed to race them clockwise around the board along the game track (the path of squares not part of any player's home column). When reaching the square below their home column, a player continues by moving tokens up the column to the finishing square.

The moves are determined by the roll of a single die, and a precise roll is required to land on the finish square. The first player to bring all their tokens to the finish wins the game. The others often continue to play to determine second-, third-, and fourth-place finishers.

=== Gameplay ===
Each player rolls a die; the highest roller begins the game. Players alternate turns in a clockwise direction. To enter a token into play from its yard to its starting square, a player must roll a six. Players can draw a token from home every time they get a six unless home is empty or move a piece six times. The start box has two own tokens (is doubled). If the player has no tokens yet in play and rolls other than a six, the turn passes to the next player.

Players must always move a token according to the die value rolled. Once players have one or more tokens in play, they select a token and move it forwards along the track the number of squares indicated by the die. If a token advances onto a space occupied by opponent's token then the opposing token is returned to its respective home point. (This requires the opponent to roll another six to return it to the starting space on the board.) If a token advances onto a space occupied by a token of the same colour, it is stacked on top to form a "block". If an opposing token lands on the same space as the block, the advancing token is returned to its respective home point.

If the player cannot draw a token from home, rolling a six earns the player an additional or "bonus" roll in that turn. If the bonus roll results in a six again, the player earns again an additional bonus roll. (Note: "Should a player throw two sixes in succession, he is allowed a third throw.") If the third roll is also a six, the player may not move and the turn immediately passes to the next player.

A player's home column squares are always "safe", since no opponent may enter them. In the home column, a player must roll the exact number needed to get each token onto the home triangle.

== Variants ==
=== List of international variants ===
Regular parqués board for four players

Ludo exists under different names and brands, and in various game derivations:

- Pachisi, Indian
- Uckers, British
- Fia, Swedish
- Eile mit Weile (Haste makes Pace), Swiss
- Cờ cá ngựa, Vietnamese
- Parchís, Spanish
- Parqués, Colombian
  - Vuelta obligada (mandatory restart)
  - Cielo robado (stolen heaven)
  - De piedra en piedra (from stone to stone)
  - Con Policía (With Policeman)

==== Mensch ärgere Dich nicht ====
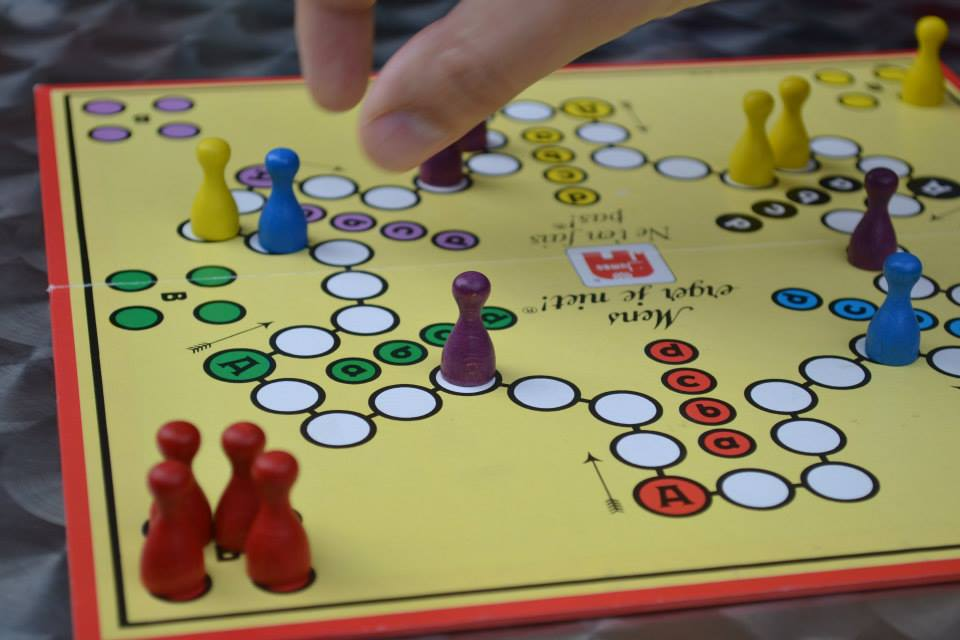
Mens erger je niet, Dutch version for six players

Mensch ärgere Dich nicht (Man, Don't Get Angry), is a German game from 1914 and has equivalent names in Albanian, Bulgarian, Croatian, Czech, Dutch, Greek, Italian, Macedonian, Polish, Romanian, Serbian, Slovak, Slovenian, and Turkish.

- "Mens erger je niet" (Dutch)
- "Γκρινιάρης" (Gree-nyá-rees: Complainer) (Greek)
- "Non t'arrabbiare" (Italian)
- "Človek, ne jezi se" (Slovenian)
- "Člověče, nezlob se" (Czech)
- "Človeče, nehnevaj sa" (Slovak)
- "Čovječe, ne ljuti se" (Croatian)
- "Човече не љути се" (Serbian)
- "Kızma Birader" (Turkish)
- "Не се сърди, човече" (Bulgarian)
- "Mos u zemëro, njeri!" (Albanian)
- "Człowieku, nie irytuj się", also known as "Chińczyk" (Polish)
- "Nu te supăra, frate" (Romanian)

In Hungary, it is known as "Ki nevet a végén?" ("Who laughs last?")

==== German specific ====
- Verliere nicht den Kopf (Do not lose your head)
- Mensch ärgere dich nicht (Don't get angry)
- Coppit
- Brändi Dog (Swiss German)

==== French ====
- Jeu des petits chevaux

==== Hasbro ====
Hasbro has multiple brand names for ludo-like games from its acquisitions including:

- Aggravation
- Headache
  - Game of Headache, British
- Based on Pachisi
  - Parcheesi, North American
  - Sorry!; North American and British
- Trouble, North American
  - Kimble, Finnish version of Trouble
  - Frustration, British and Irish version of Trouble

==== Chinese ====
- Aeroplane chess: A Chinese cross-and-circle board game derived from Ludo, it uses aeroplanes as tokens, with additional features such as coloured cells, jumps, and shortcuts.

==== Canadian ====
- Tock: Players race their four tokens (or marbles) around the game board from start to finish, with the objective being to be the first to take all of one's tokens "home". Like Sorry!, it is played with playing cards rather than dice.

==== Latvian ====
The Latvian version of the game is called "Riču-Raču". The board is larger than the original board with seven home spaces instead of four (but the player must always reach the four farthest home spaces anyway, if the player overrolls, then they must move the extra spaces back and wait for their next turn). Captures are allowed and two tokens cannot occupy the same space. If a player rolls a one or a six, they can either get a second roll or move a token to the starting position.

=== Differences ===
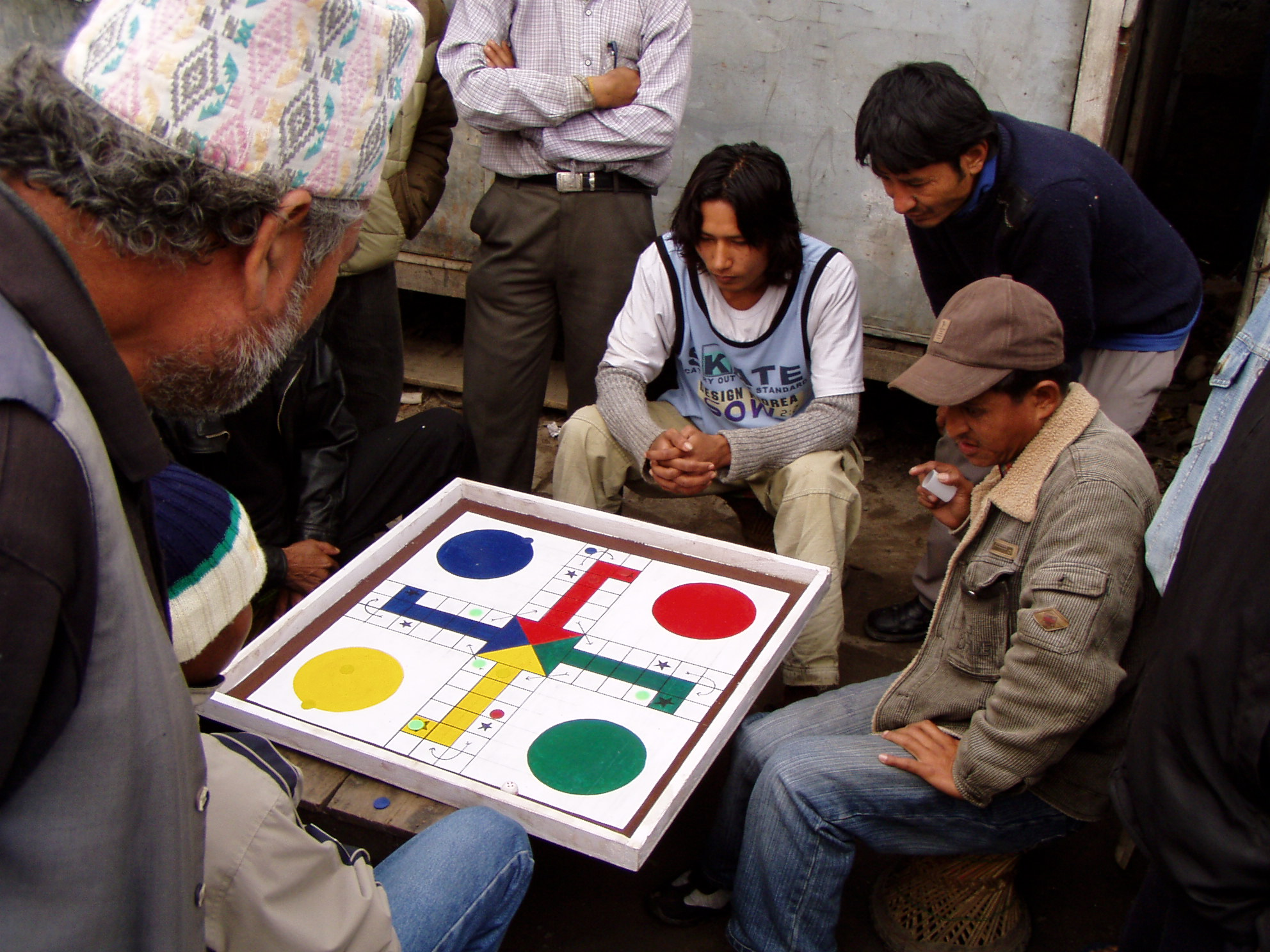
Pachisi variant being played on a Ludo board in Nepal

- Ludo played in the Indian subcontinent features a safe square in each quadrant, normally the fourth square from the top in the rightmost column. These squares are usually marked with a star. In India Ludo is often played with two dice, and rolling one on a die also allows a token to enter active play. Thus if a player rolls a one and a six, they may get a token out and move it six steps.
- In Pakistan, a variation that uses two dice allows backwards movement. The dice are rolled and the die values can be used independently or in combination to move two pieces or a single piece forwards or backwards or both. (E.g., if the roll gives one and four, the player can move a single piece 4 steps forwards and then 1 step backwards, or 1 step forwards and 4 steps backwards, or 1 then 4 steps forwards or backwards. Or the player can move a piece 1 step forwards or backwards, and another piece 4 steps forwards or backwards.)
- To get a game started faster, some house rules allow a player with no pieces on the board to bring their first piece into play on any roll, on a one or a six, or allow multiple tries to roll a six (with three rolls being the most popular).
- If a piece lands on the same space as another piece of the same colour, the moved piece must take the preceding space.
- Some variations permit doubled blocks to be passed by rolling a six or a one.
- A block of two or more pieces cannot be taken by an opponent's single piece.
- Doubled pieces may move half the number if an even number is thrown (e.g. move two spaces if a four is thrown).
- A doubled piece may capture another doubled piece (like in Coppit). Three pieces together are weak and can be cut by a single piece.
- A board may have only four spaces in each home column. All four of a player's pieces must finish in these spaces for the player to have finished the game. (See Mensch ärgere dich nicht.)
- A player must move all the numbers rolled (e.g. if a player rolls multiple sixes, they have to use all the numbers to move).
- A player cannot capture or enter finish if they have numbers remaining. (E.g., if a player rolls a six and a two and they have the option to capture or enter finish with one of their pieces using the two, they can only do so if they have another piece that can use the six.)
- To speed the game up, extra turns or bonus moves can be awarded for capturing a piece or getting a piece home; these may grant passage past a block.
- In Denmark and some other countries the board has eight spaces marked with a globe and eight with a star. The globes are safe spaces where a piece cannot be captured. The exception is that a player who has not yet entered all pieces, can always enter a piece on a roll of six. If the entry space is occupied by another player's piece, that piece is captured. Otherwise the entry spaces work like the other globe spaces. A piece which would have landed on a star instead moves to the next star.
- In Vietnam, it is called "Cờ cá ngựa", where the game is modeled after a horse race with the tokens modeled as horse heads. In this variation, a one is given equal status to a six (meaning that the player can enter a token into play and can roll again). Furthermore, once a player's token reaches their home column, it can only go up each square with an exact roll. This means that a person outside the column must roll a one to enter the first square, a two afterwards to enter the second, and so forth.

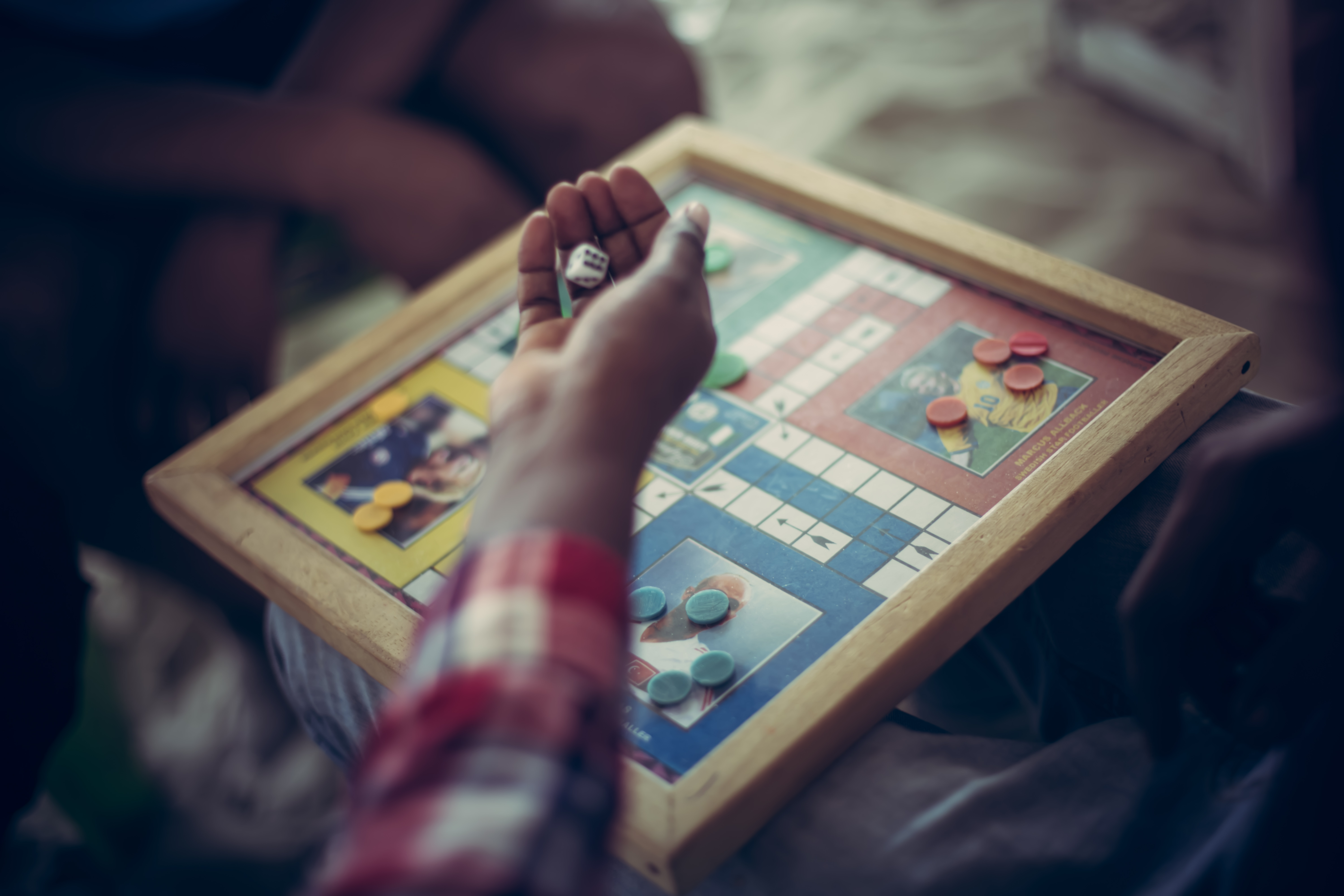
A player about to throw the die

==== African ====
In some parts of Africa including Nigeria, Ghana, Botswana, Kenya, Lesotho and South Africa, the following rules are reportedly played:

- A doubled block also blocks trailing pieces of the player who created the block, or blocks them unless they roll the exact number to land on the block; additionally, the doubled block cannot move forwards until the block that landed upon it moves off again. This reduces the tactical advantage of a block and makes the game more interesting.
- If the two players sitting opposite are partners, the players can exchange numbers.
- There are four safety squares on the board, like castle squares in Pachisi, as well as the safe home squares, where a piece may able to move forwards or backwards and start their turn before previous player finishes.
- A piece landing on a square with an opponent's piece not only sends the opponent piece back to the starting area but also sends the landing piece to its home square.
- A player cannot move their first piece into the home column unless they have captured at least one piece of any of the opponents.
- If a player captures the piece of another player, they are awarded a bonus roll. If in the bonus roll, another player's piece is captured, another bonus roll is awarded and so on.

==== Indian ====
The Indian Ludo is based on the ancient game Pachisi. It was first played on cloth boards using cowrie shells and small tokens. Over time, it changed into a simpler version with a square board and a single die. This version is now played in homes across the country.

Players take turns rolling the die and moving their tokens around the board to reach the home area. If a token lands on another, it can be sent back to start.

The game can be played digitally through Indian mobile apps like Zupee Ludo and Ludo King, and on the web.

== See also ==
- Aeroplane chess
- Ashta Chamma
- Ashte kashte, a game with similar rules
- Backgammon
- Chaupur
- Mensch ärgere Dich nicht
- Sorry!
- Patolli
