= Schmidt Spiele =

German board game publisher

Schmidt Spiele GmbH
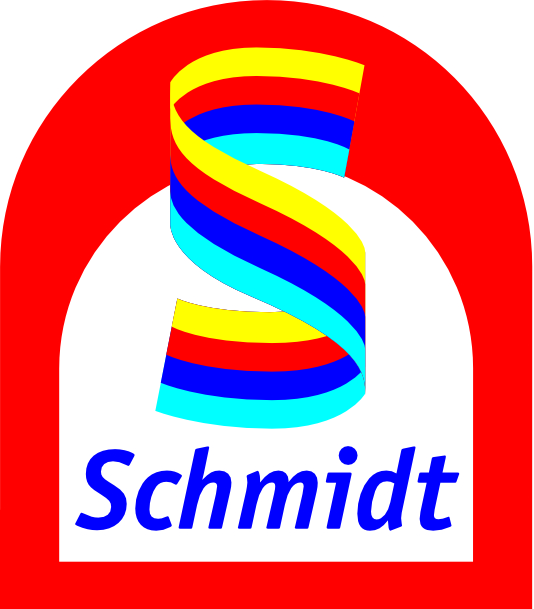
- Type: GmbH
- Founded: 1907
- Headquarters: Berlin, Germany
- Key people: Axel Kaldenhoven; Martina Priemer
- Products: family and social games, puzzles, toys, soft toys
- Website: www.schmidtspiele.de

Schmidt Spiele GmbH is a German board game publisher based in Berlin. Founded in Munich, the company develops and distributes board games, card games, puzzles, plush and wooden toys for various target groups. With well-known classics such as Mensch ärgere Dich nicht®, Kniffel®, and DOG®, as well as award-winning games like Auf Achse and Qwirkle™, Schmidt Spiele is one of the most traditional providers in the German boardgame industry. The publisher has been part of Good Time Holding since 1997 and regularly participates in major national and international game fairs. In addition to classic products, Schmidt Spiele also offers digital game versions.

== History ==
=== Historical Development ===
The origins of Schmidt Spiele date back to 1907, when the lithographer Josef Friedrich Schmidt founded the company Schmidt & Söhne in Munich. In the early years, the publisher specialized in the production and distribution of board games.

The company’s greatest success came in 1914 with the release of Mensch ärgere Dich nicht®, which was developed by Josef Friedrich Schmidt in a small workshop in the Giesing district of Munich. The dice game quickly became a bestseller and evolved over generations into a classic of German gaming culture.

In the following decades, the publisher continuously expanded its range and established itself as one of the leading providers of board games in the German-speaking world. In 1984, Schmidt Spiele, in collaboration with Droemer Knaur, published the first commercially successful pen-and-paper role-playing game in Germany, Das Schwarze Auge.

Other successful titles of the company include Kniffel®, Auf Achse, DOG®, The Quacks of Quedlinburg, as well as numerous board and card games for children, families, and frequent players.

In 1997, Schmidt Spiele fell into a difficult situation and had to file for insolvency. In August 1997, the headquarters in Eching near Munich was closed, and the main production facility in Ingolstadt was taken over by the Lower Franconian Ludwig Scheer GmbH.

The rest of the company, particularly the brand Schmidt Spiele as well as the rights to most games, was acquired by the Berlin-based Blatz Group, which today operates as Good Time Holding GmbH. It also includes sister companies such as KIDDINX Media and KIDDINX Studios. Under the new ownership, the significantly better-known name Schmidt Spiele was retained. In addition to traditional game production, the company is now one of the leading providers of puzzles in Europe and distributes licensed products featuring designs from Disney, Universal, and Thomas Kinkade.

In 2008, Schmidt Spiele GmbH acquired the rights to the premium brand Drei Magier, thereby ensuring the continuation of the popular children's game brand. Drei Magier stands for challenging children's games.

Since October 2017, Selecta® has been part of the brand world of Schmidt Spiele. For over 57 years, Selecta® has been manufacturing wooden toys with the highest quality standards.

In addition to its product range, the company regularly participates in international trade fairs, including SPIEL in Essen, the International Spielwarenmesse in Nuremberg, and the Berlin Brettspiel Con. These events showcase new releases and facilitate exchanges with industry professionals and board game enthusiasts.

Information: Mensch ärgere Dich nicht®
Name of the game	Mensch ärgere Dich nicht®
Inventor	Josef Friedrich Schmidt
Publication	1914
Significance	One of the best-known and best-selling games in Germany
Special	Part of the collection in the Haus der Geschichte, Bonn
Status	Still an integral part of the Schmidt Spiele range today

== Sustainability ==
Since 2022, Schmidt Spiele has been recording the CO₂ footprint of all company locations and is implementing measures to reduce emissions in collaboration with ClimatePartner. The locations are supplied with green electricity and heated with renewable energies, and the fleet is gradually being converted to electric and hybrid vehicles.

The publisher also pursues sustainable approaches in product design. Packaging is increasingly sealed without shrink wrap, using paper-based adhesive dots instead. Materials mostly consist of recyclable components. At the International Toy Fair 2025, the company presented NATPAX®, a novel puzzle cardboard made of 60 percent waste paper and 40 percent grass.

== Trade Show appearances and Events ==
The publisher regularly participates with its own trade show booths at the SPIEL consumer fair in Essen, the International Toy Fair in Nuremberg, and the Berlin Brettspiel Con. There, they present current innovations and maintain direct exchanges with the specialty trade, the press, and game enthusiasts.

In addition to these trade fair appearances, Schmidt Spiele organizes the Schmidt Puzzle Championship annually. This speed puzzle event takes place throughout the year in various locations and multiple federal states. Anyone aged five and above can participate, and there is no entry fee. The puzzles to be solved remain a secret until the day of the event. All participants start simultaneously with a 60-piece puzzle. The goal of the simultaneous action is to complete the puzzle as quickly as possible. The events are organized by local partners on site and also serve to promote the puzzle range of Schmidt Spiele.

For the cultural games Mensch ärgere Dich nicht and Kniffel, championships and tournaments are held regularly. In several federal states, state championships are organized, and there is also an official world championship for Mensch ärgere Dich nicht in tournament mode.

=== Cooperations ===
Schmidt Spiele also maintains collaborations with various tourism partners in Germany. Among the partner regions are the Saxon Switzerland Tourism Association, the Sankt Peter-Ording Tourism Center, Büsum, the Butjadingen Tourism Service, as well as the North Sea spa Cuxhaven. As part of these partnerships, joint actions, special editions, and events related to the theme of games are offered.
