= Parcheesi =

Abstract strategy board game

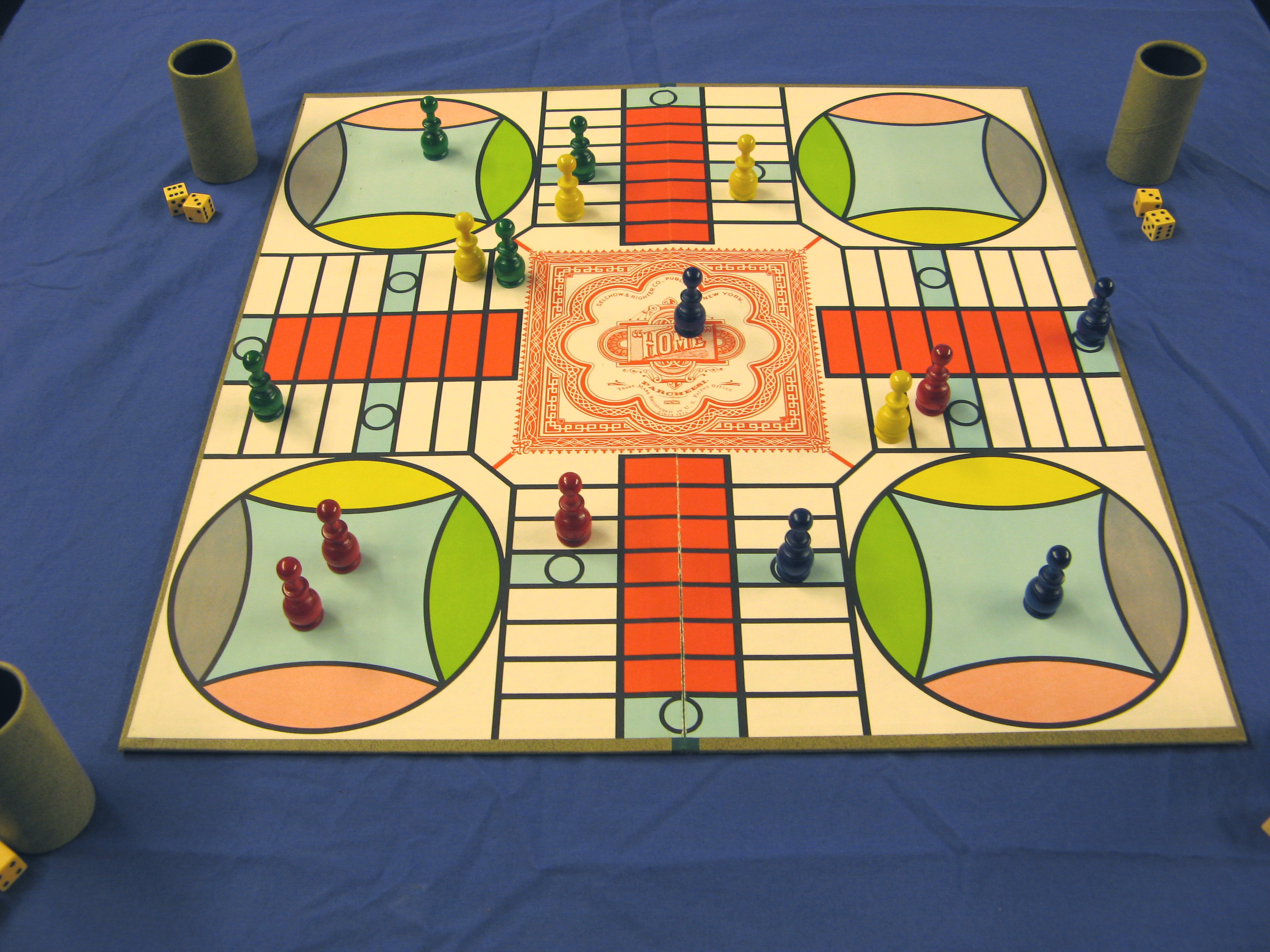
A game of Parcheesi in progress

Parcheesi is a brand-name American adaptation of the Indian cross and circle board game Pachisi, published by E. G. Selchow & Co and Winning Moves Games USA.

== Equipment ==
Parcheesi is typically played with two dice, four pieces per player and a gameboard with a track around the outside, four corner spaces and four home paths leading to a central end space. The most popular Parcheesi boards in America have 68 spaces around the edge of the board, 12 of which are darkened safe spaces. Each corner of the board contains one player's nest, or starting area.

== Setup ==
- Each player positions their four single colored pieces in their respective starting nest.
- Each player rolls a single die to determine player order. The player with the lowest roll goes first.
- The order of players' turns moves to the next player on the current player's left.
- Pieces move from the nest to the colored starting space to the left of the nest, per rules in the following section.

== Rules ==
=== Gameplay ===
A player rolls the dice and must use the topmost facing die pip values shown to move their pieces around the board in one of the following ways:

- Only pieces not in the nest may move forward on the board.
- Pieces may only leave the nest with a roll of a five on a single die or the sum of the dice. A double five can be used to move two pieces from the nest simultaneously.
- In the case of a non-doubles roll, a player may move one or two pieces, either one piece by each of the numbers on the two dice or one piece by the total. If no move is possible, the turn is forfeited.
- When moving a single piece the total of two dice the turn is taken in increments, allowing pieces to be captured along the way. For example, if a double two is rolled and an opponent's piece lies on a cream space two spaces in front of the piece you wish to move the full four, you would move the piece two, and then two again, allowing the opponent's piece to be captured.
- All die rolls must be taken and may not be voluntarily forfeited by a player.
- If a player cannot use both dice, the player must use one of the dice, if possible. If either can be used, the player must use the larger die.
- All die moves must be taken before the application of any extra rewards for sending an opponent to their nest or moving a piece to its home position.
- With a roll of doubles, the player makes four moves, one for each of the numbers on top of the two dice and one for each of the numbers on the bottoms. The player may distribute these four moves among one, two, three, or four pieces. Note that the sum of numbers on the opposite sides of a die is always seven, so with doubles, there are a total of fourteen spaces to move. This bonus of the bottom dice numbers is only granted if all four pieces are out of the nest.
- When the player rolls doubles, the player rolls again after moving, provided all of the doubles roll was used. If the player is unable to use all of the roll, the player doesn't get another roll. Also, some variations penalize the player for rolling three sets of doubles by sending the player's piece closest to home, and ending the turn.
- When a piece ends its move on the same space as an opponent's piece, the opponent's piece is sent back to its nest.
- A piece may not be placed on a safe space (generally colored light blue) if it is occupied by an opponent's piece. The exception is the safe space used when a piece leaves its nest — a single piece occupying such a safe space is sent back to its nest when an opponent's piece leaves the nest and occupies the space.
- A blockade is formed when two pieces of a single player occupy the same space. No piece of any player may move through a blockade, including pieces of the blockade owner. Blockade pieces may not be moved forward together with the roll of a double. Another player's piece cannot land in a space occupied by a blockade, even to leave its nest. Local rules may limit the number of turns that a blockade can stay in place.
- A piece is not required to enter the home row and can pass the row and start another circuit of the board voluntarily or as the result of requirement of the use of the total die roll.
- A turn ends when the next player rolls the dice with the consent of the current player. Any rewards not taken are lost.

=== Rewards of extra moves ===
- The reward for sending an opponent's piece to the nest is a free move of twenty spaces that may not be split between pieces.
- The reward for landing a piece in the home space is a free move of ten spaces that may not be split between pieces.

=== Winning the game ===
- Moving all four pieces to the home position wins the game.
- Pieces may only be moved to the home position with an exact application of the total roll, the value on a single die, or the complete application of a reward.

== Reception ==
Games magazine included Parcheesi in their "Top 100 Games of 1980", praising it as a "classic chase game from India that has withstood the test of millennia".

Games magazine included Parcheesi in their "Top 100 Games of 1981", describing it as "one of the easiest board games to learn and is perfectly suited for family play".

== See also ==
- List of cross and circle games
- Pachisi, medieval Indian game on which Parcheesi is based
- Patolli, pre-Columbian Mesoamerican game
- Sorry! (game)
- Ludo
