= Aeroplane chess =

20th-century board game

Aeroplane Chess
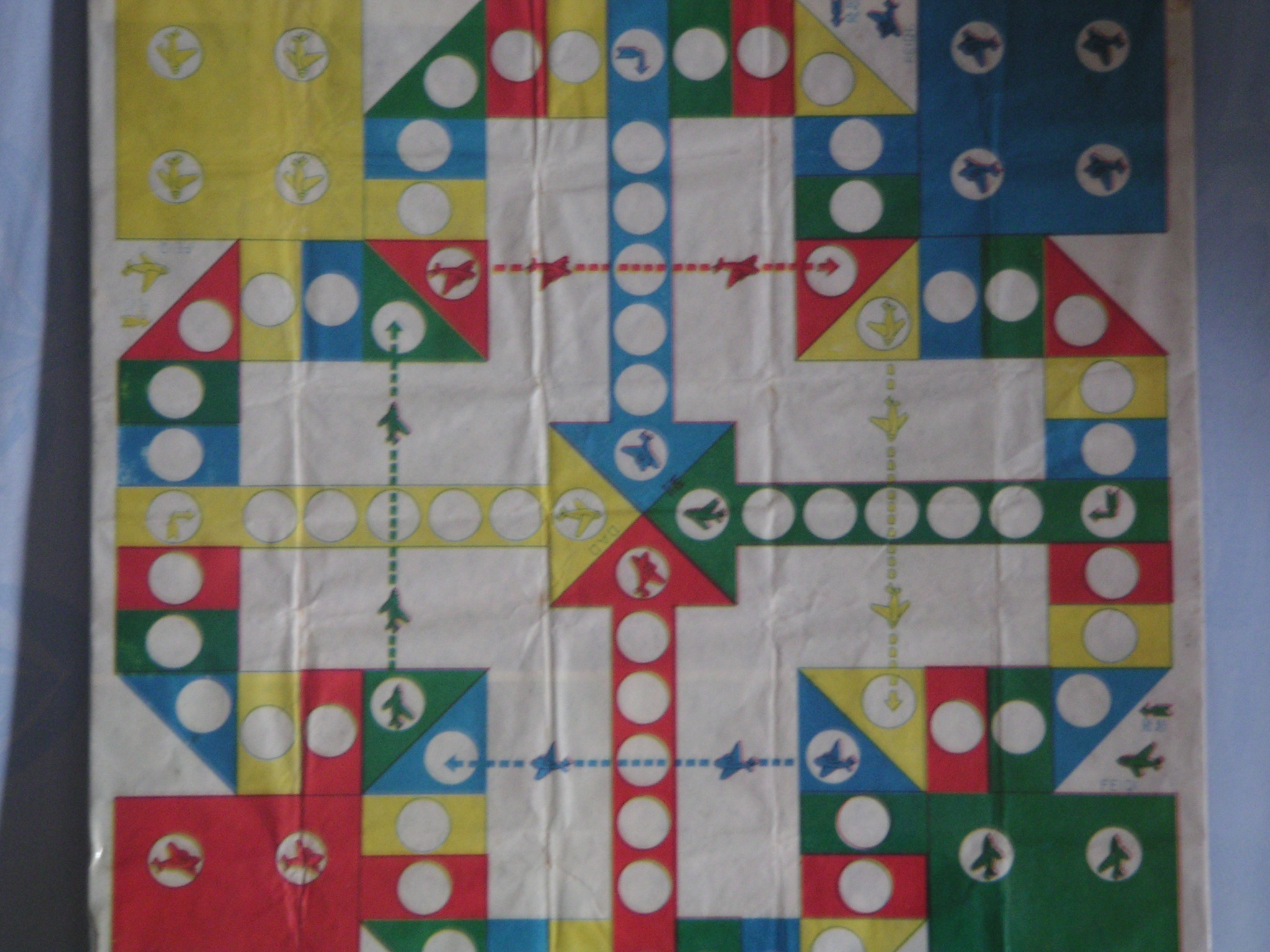
- Aeroplane Chess gameboard
- Players: 2–4
- Setup time: < 5 minutes
- Playing time: Around 30 minutes
- Chance: High (dice rolling)
- Skills: Dice rolling Identifying optimal moves

Aeroplane chess (simplified Chinese: 飞行棋; traditional Chinese: 飛行棋; pinyin: fēixíng qí, literally "aviation game" or "flying chess") is a Chinese cross-and-circle board game similar to the Western game of Ludo and the Indian game of Pachisi. Developed in the 20th century, aeroplane chess features airplanes as pieces instead of the more abstract pawns and beehive-shaped pieces found in the games from which it is derived. Aeroplane chess has spread around the world, especially in Africa.

== History and implementation ==
Aeroplane chess comes in many different packages that are manufactured by different companies. The inventor of aeroplane chess is not known, but it may have been developed directly from Ludo. The game has entered the public domain, now ranking among Jungle and Luzhanqi as one of China's classic modern board games.

== Equipment ==
- Gameboard with the following notable features:
  - Four starting hangars in each corner, one for each color, with an adjacent launch area
  - A multicolored track consisting of 52 spaces, evenly divided between the colours red, yellow, blue and green
  - Four arrow-shaped home zones, each leading from the track to the end spaces at the centre of the board
  - Four shortcut spaces, one in each color, usually illustrated with a dashed line and arrow
- Four sets of 4 coloured airplane pieces, typically red, yellow, blue and green.
- A die, typically 6-sided.

== Objective ==
Aeroplane Chess board diagram. The specific clockwise order of the colored hangars is maintained in the order of the color sequence of spaces in the track (in this example, it is red–yellow–blue–green), with home zones immediately anti-clockwise of their respective hangar and shortcuts opposite the respective home zones.

Two to four players each try to get all their own plane pieces from their hangars, located at the corners of the board, into the base of their opponents colour in the centre of the board. Each player takes a turn by rolling the dice. On their turn a player may do the following:

- Take a piece out of the hangar onto the corresponding adjacent launch area. This can only be done by rolling a six.
- Move a piece that is already on the board clockwise around the track, the number of spaces indicated by the die.

Additional rules:

- A roll of six, whether it is used to move a piece out of the hangar or move a piece already on the board, gives that player another roll.
  - A second consecutive roll of six gives the player a third roll.
  - If the player rolls a third consecutive six, any pieces moved by the first two sixes must return to their hangar and play passes to the next player.
- When a player lands on an opponent's piece, the opponent returns that piece to its hangar.
- When a plane lands on a space of its own colour, it immediately jumps four spaces ahead to the next space of its own colour. Any opposing planes sitting on these squares are sent back to their hangars.
- There are additional shortcut squares. When a plane lands on one of these of its own colour, it may take the shortcut, and any opposing planes in the path of the shortcut (under the dashed line) are sent back to their hangars. This may also by done in succession with the previous rule, with a jump leading to shortcut. Some also play that a direct land on a shortcut may be followed by a jump.

== Ending the game ==
A plane must fly into the centre base on an exact roll. When a plane does so, it is placed face down back in its own hangar, indicating that it is done for the game. The first player to get all four of their planes to the centre of the board wins. The rest play until there is only one loser.

== Optional rules ==
Like many other board games, people add their own rules that give the game a colloquial and folkloric quality:

- Evens:
  - A player may move an airplane from the hangar to the launch area upon any even-numbered roll.
- Stacked Movement:
  - When a plane lands on another plane in its own fleet (of the same colour), the player may stack the pieces and move them as a unit until they reach the centre or are landed on by an opponent.
  - When stacked pieces are sent back to their hangar by an opponent landing on them, they are no longer stacked.
- Double Six:
  - A second consecutive roll of six triggers the return of any piece moved during the prior roll to the hangar, instead of the third consecutive six.
- Open Shortcut:
  - A player landing on any shortcut space may move along its path, regardless of colour.
  - A shortcut of corresponding colour gives the player the advantage of being able to make an additional jump, either before or after the shortcut, but not both.
- Stacked Battle:
  - If a player moves a piece or pieces onto an opposing stack that has a greater number of planes than the number landing on the stack, the stack remains and the player moves their plane or planes back one space.
- Dice Battle:
  - When a plane lands on an opposing plane, players determine which gets sent back to its hangar by rolling the die, with the high roll determining the winner.
  - When one plane attacks a stack of planes, it must battle each one by rolling the die.
  - When a stack attacks another stack, the planes battle each other with a series of successive die rolls until only one player occupies the square.
- Home Zone Backtrack:
  - If a player cannot move pieces into the centre base by an exact roll of the die, then they must move their piece backwards according to number rolled.
