= Kimble (board game) =

Board game

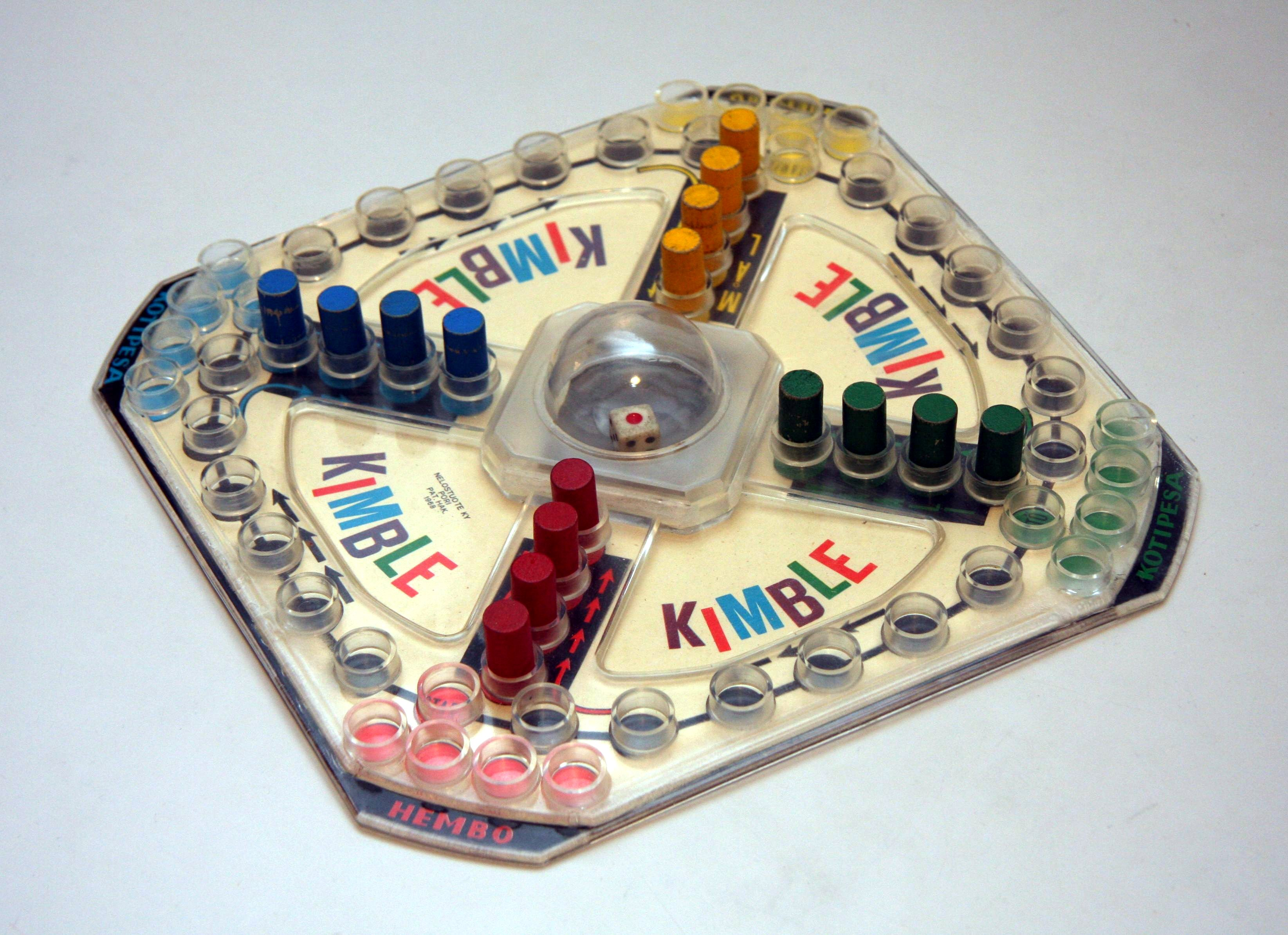
- 1968 version of the game.
- Publishers: Tactic Games
- Players: 2–4
- Setup time: Approx. 1 minute
- Playing time: 45 minutes
- Chance: High (dice rolling, luck)
- Age range: 4 and above

Kimble is a Finnish licensed version of the board game Trouble in which players compete to be the first to send four pieces all the way around a board. Pieces are moved according to the roll of a die. Kimble is manufactured by Tactic Games Group and currently sold under the Tactic brand.

== History ==
The game was first introduced in Finland in 1967 and is still sold virtually unchanged. The name refers to the hero of the then popular TV show The Fugitive, and it was marketed as the "Finnish pursuit game". The game has been highly popular in Finland for its whole existence. Tens of thousands of Kimble games are sold every year, and by 2003 nearly a million copies were sold.

== Game play ==
Gameplayers can send opponents' pieces back to the start by landing on them. Pieces are protected from capture after arriving in the final few slots.

The most notable feature of Kimble is the "Pop-o-matic" dice container. This device is a clear plastic hemisphere containing the dice, placed over a flexible sheet. Players roll the dice by pressing down quickly on the bubble, which flexes the sheet and causes the dice to tumble upon its rebound. The Pop-o-matic container produces a popping sound when it is used, and prevents the dice from being lost. The captive dice allows for quick dice rolls, and players' turns can be performed in rapid succession.
