= Cross and circle game =

Board game design

Cross and circle is a board game design used for race games played throughout the world.

== Design ==
Cross and circle

Cruciform

The classic Korean nyout (yut) cross and circle is collapsed, creating a cruciform board.

The basic design comprises a circle divided into four equal portions by a cross inscribed inside it like four spokes in a wheel; the classic example of this design is yut. The term "cross and circle game", however, is also applied to boards that replace the circle with a square, and cruciform boards that collapse the circle onto the cross; all three types are topologically equivalent. Ludo and Parcheesi are examples of frequently played cruciform games.

The category may also be expanded to include circular or square boards without a cross which are nevertheless quartered (Zohn Ahl), and boards that have more than four spokes (Aggravation, Trivial Pursuit). The gameboard for the Aztec game patolli consists of a collapsed circle without an interior cross and thus has the distinction of being a cross that is a circle (topologically), without being a cross plus circle.

Tokens are moved around spaces drawn on the circle and on the cross, with the goal of being the first player to move all tokens all the way around the board. Generally the circle of the cross and circle forms the primary circuit followed by the players' pieces. The function of the cross is more variable; for example, in yut the cross forms shortcuts to the finish, whereas in pachisi the four spokes are used as player-specific exits and entrances to the pieces' home. In non-race games (like Coppit and Trivial Pursuit) all paths may be undifferentiated in function.

== History ==
Although these board game designs may be of considerable antiquity, firm evidence is sparse. In India, there are uncited claims that the most ancient board games would date back to BC 3500 in the time of legendary Ruler King Bharata. Noted writer and translator Gilles Schaufelberger lists Sanskrit words for board and dice games from ancient India (based on Heinrich Lüders' work). For cruciform boards, the monumental Pachisi or Chaupat boards of the Moghul ruler Akbar (1542–1605), designed to accommodate humans as playing pieces, "still represent the earliest secure evidence for the existence of the game in India." Culin found evidence for a Nyout-like game existing in China in the 3rd century AD, though this does not seem to be accepted by H. J. R. Murray. Mayan cross and circle boards have been found on stones from the 7th century AD. While there are some reports of games using a "quartered circle" design being played by North American Indian tribes, there is no concrete evidence they existed outside of memoirs written by American explorers.

== Esoteric connections ==
Cross and circle boards may suggest a variety of mystical, symbolic, or esoteric designs such as mandalas; sun and earth symbols; swastikas; or Celtic, Coptic, and Greek crosses. However, mere visual similarities do not prove a deeper connection; and demonstrating any historical connection has proven to be a slippery matter. Many modern discussions of the religious, magical, or divinatory genesis of board games stem from the work of Stewart Culin who postulated a single source: the "classification of all things according to the Four Directions" by means of divinatory arrows, and that "[s]urvivals of these magical processes constitute our present games" (including all dice, board, card, and domino games). He quotes, for example, an "account of the Zuñi War Gods" which explicitly links divination, the 4 quarters of the earth, and games. Nyout (Yut) and Native American games like Zohn Ahl are integral to his argument. However, later scholars have called into question our ability to assign historical precedence among randomizing activities such as divination, impartial decision-making, gambling, and game-playing, and elements of his monolithic genealogy of games have been called "absurd".

Nevertheless, some historical connections are in evidence. E.g., in the 19th century, Yut stick dice were used for divination, with the results being looked up in a book not unlike the I Ching.

== See also ==
- List of cross and circle games
