= Pachisi =

Board game that originated in medieval India

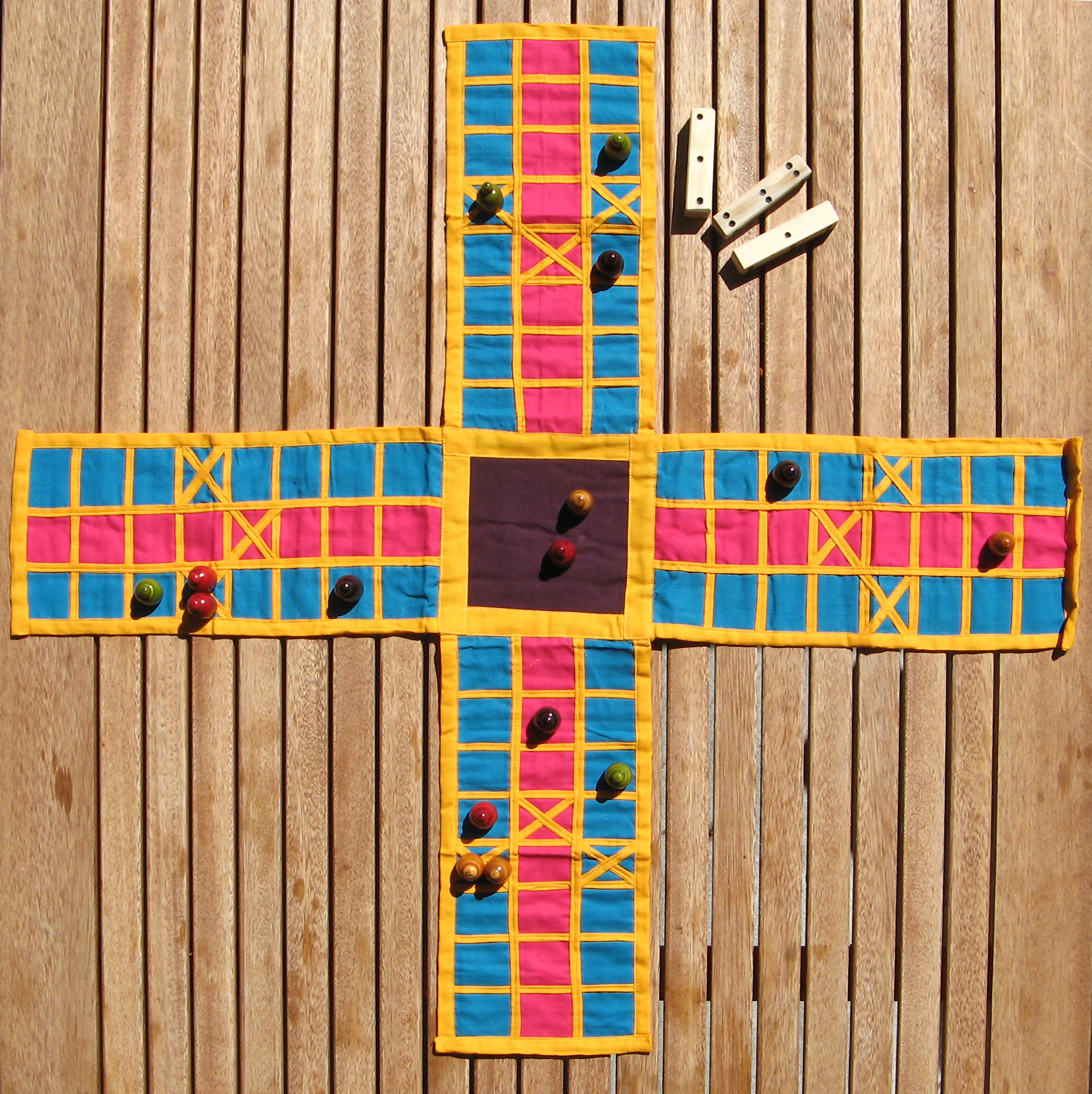
- A game of Pachisi on a cloth board
- Years active: Ancient India to present
- Genres: Board game; Cross and circle game; Race game; Mind sport
- Players: 2–4
- Setup time: Negligible
- Playing time: 30–60 minutes
- Chance: Medium (dice rolling)
- Age range: 4+
- Skills: Strategy, tactics, counting, probability
- Synonyms: Twenty-Five

Pachisi (/pəˈtʃiːzi/, Hindustani: [pəˈtʃiːsiː]) is a cross and circle board game that originated in Ancient India. It is described in the ancient text Mahabharata under the name of "Pasha". It is played on a board shaped like a symmetrical cross. A player's pieces move around the board based upon a throw of six or seven cowrie shells as lots, with the number of shells resting with the aperture upward indicating the number of spaces to move.

The name of the game is derived from the Hindi word paccīs, meaning 'twenty-five', the largest score that can be thrown with the cowrie shells; thus this game is also known by the name Twenty-Five. There are other versions of this game where the largest score that can be thrown is thirty.

In addition to chaupar, there are similar games that have originated around the world. Barjis (barsis) is popular in the Levant, mainly Syria, while Parchís is another game popular in Spain and northern Morocco. Parqués is its Colombian equivalent. Parcheesi, Patchesi, Sorry!, and Ludo are among the commercial versions of similar games. The jeu des petits chevaux ('game of little horses') is played in France, and Mensch ärgere Dich nicht is a popular German cross-and-circle game.

== History ==
Games similar to chaupar with different colour schemes along with dice have been identified from the Iron Age during the Painted Grey Ware period from sites in Mathura and Noh (1100–800 BCE). Cruciform boards have been depicted from art reliefs of Chandraketugarh dated to 2nd–1st century BCE. A 6th- or 7th-century representation of Shiva and Parvati said to be playing Chaupar (a closely related game) in fact depicts only dice and not the distinctive board. In a similar period, a board identical to pachisi was discovered in the Ellora cave system. A Song dynasty (960–1279) document referencing the Chinese game Chupu (Chinese: 樗蒲; pinyin: chūpú), "invented in western India and spread to China in the time of the Wei dynasty (AD 220–265)" may relate to Chaupar, but the actual nature of the Chinese game (which may be more closely related to backgammon) is uncertain. Speculation that Pachisi derived from the earlier game of Ashtapada is plausible but unsubstantiated.

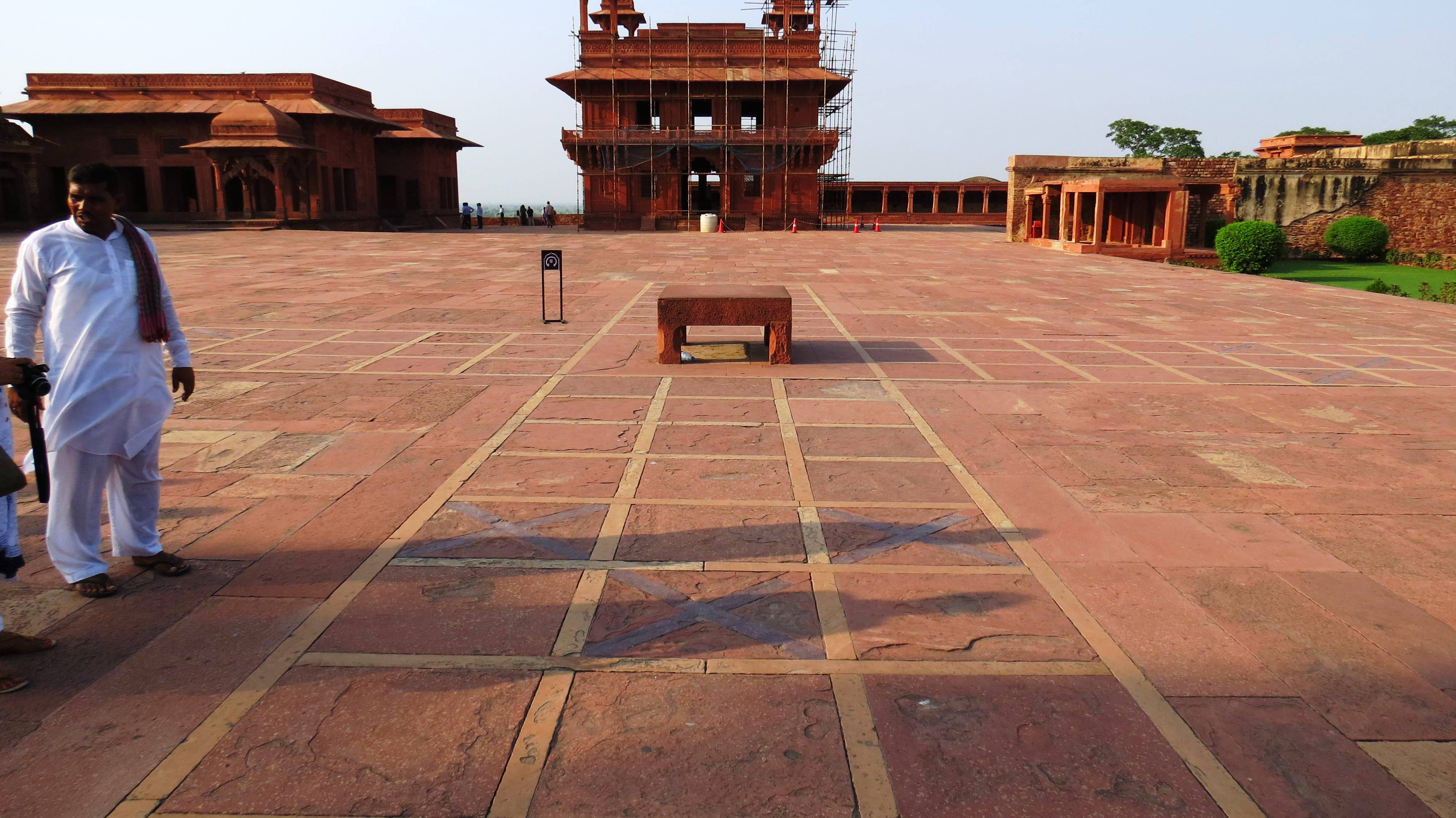
Large ancient garden version – Fatehpur Sikri – India; marked squares can just be made out under the shadows of the onlookers.

Louis Rousselet wrote:

The game of Pachisi was played by Akbar in a truly regal manner. The Court itself, divided into red and white squares, being the board, and an enormous stone raised on four feet, representing the central point. It was here that Akbar and his courtiers played this game; sixteen young slaves from the harem wearing the players' colours, represented the pieces, and moved to the squares according to the throw of the dice. It is said that the Emperor took such a fancy to playing the game on this grand scale that he had a court for pachisi constructed in all his palaces, and traces of such are still visible at Agra and Allahabad.

Irving Finkel adds:

To date, these grandiose boards still represent the earliest secure evidence for the existence of the game in India. The game's role in the history of India still remains to be investigated. It is often assumed that the gambling game that plays so significant a role in the Mahabharata, the classical literary epic, is pachisi, but the descriptions, such as they are, do not tie in with the game, and this conclusion is perhaps erroneous.

In 1938, the American toy and game company Transogram introduced a mass market board game version called Game of India, later marketed as Pa-Chiz-Si: The Game of India.

== Players ==
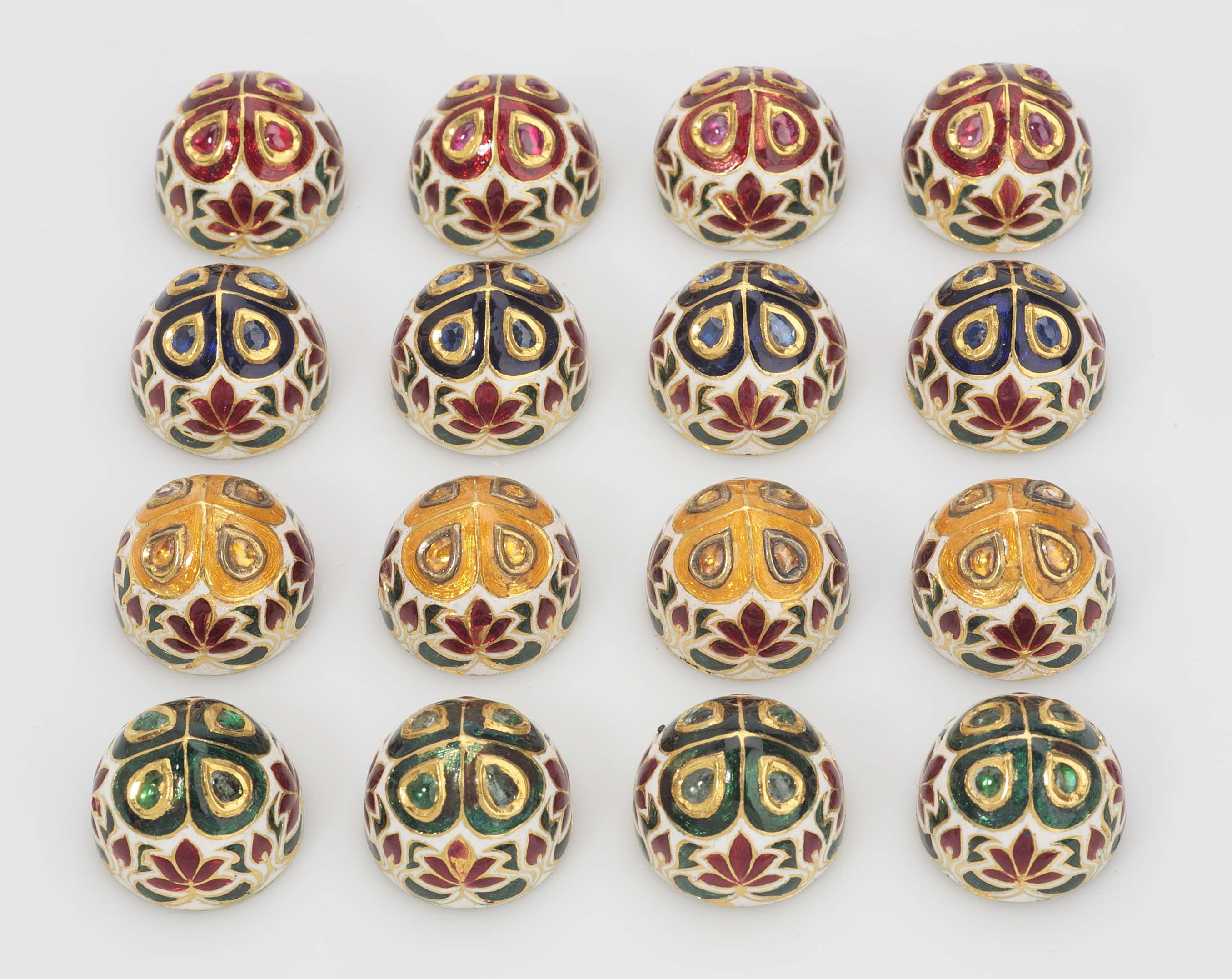
Pachisi pieces in enamelled gold with precious stones, 18th century Mughal India, Khalili Collection of Islamic Art

Pachisi is a game for two, three, or four players, four usually play in two teams. One team has yellow and black pieces, the other team has red and green. The team which moves all its pieces to the finish first wins the game.

== Traditional equipment ==
Each player has four beehive-shaped pieces (this can be increased to up to 16 pieces on each side in some versions). Different players' pieces are distinguishable by their colours: black, green, red, and yellow.

Six cowrie shells are used to determine the amount to move the players' pieces. The shells are thrown from the player's hand and the number of cowries which fall with their openings upwards is used to determine how many spaces the player may move:

Cowries facing up	Value	Earns another turn?	Chance of occurring
0	25	Yes	1.6%
1	10	Yes	9.4%
2	2	No	23.4%
3	3	No	31.2%
4	4	No	23.4%
5	5	No	9.4%
6	6	Yes	1.6%

In some versions, seven cowrie shells are used:

Cowries facing up	Value	Name	Earns another turn?	Chance of occurring
0	7	Sat	Yes	0.8%
1	10	Dus	Yes	5.5%
2	2	Dooga	No	16.4%
3	3	Teeni	No	27.3%
4	4	Chari	No	27.3%
5	25	Pachees	Yes	16.4%
6	35	Paintees	Yes	5.5%
7	14	Chaudah	Yes	0.8%

The board is usually embroidered on cloth. The playing area is cruciform. There is a large square in the centre, called the Charkoni, which is the starting and finishing position of the pieces. The four arms are divided into three columns of eight squares. The players' pieces are moved along these columns during play.

Twelve squares are specially marked as castle squares. Four of these are positioned at the end of the middle columns of each arm; the other eight are four squares inwards from the end of the outer columns on each arm. A piece may not be captured by an opponent while it lies on a castle square.

== Gameplay ==
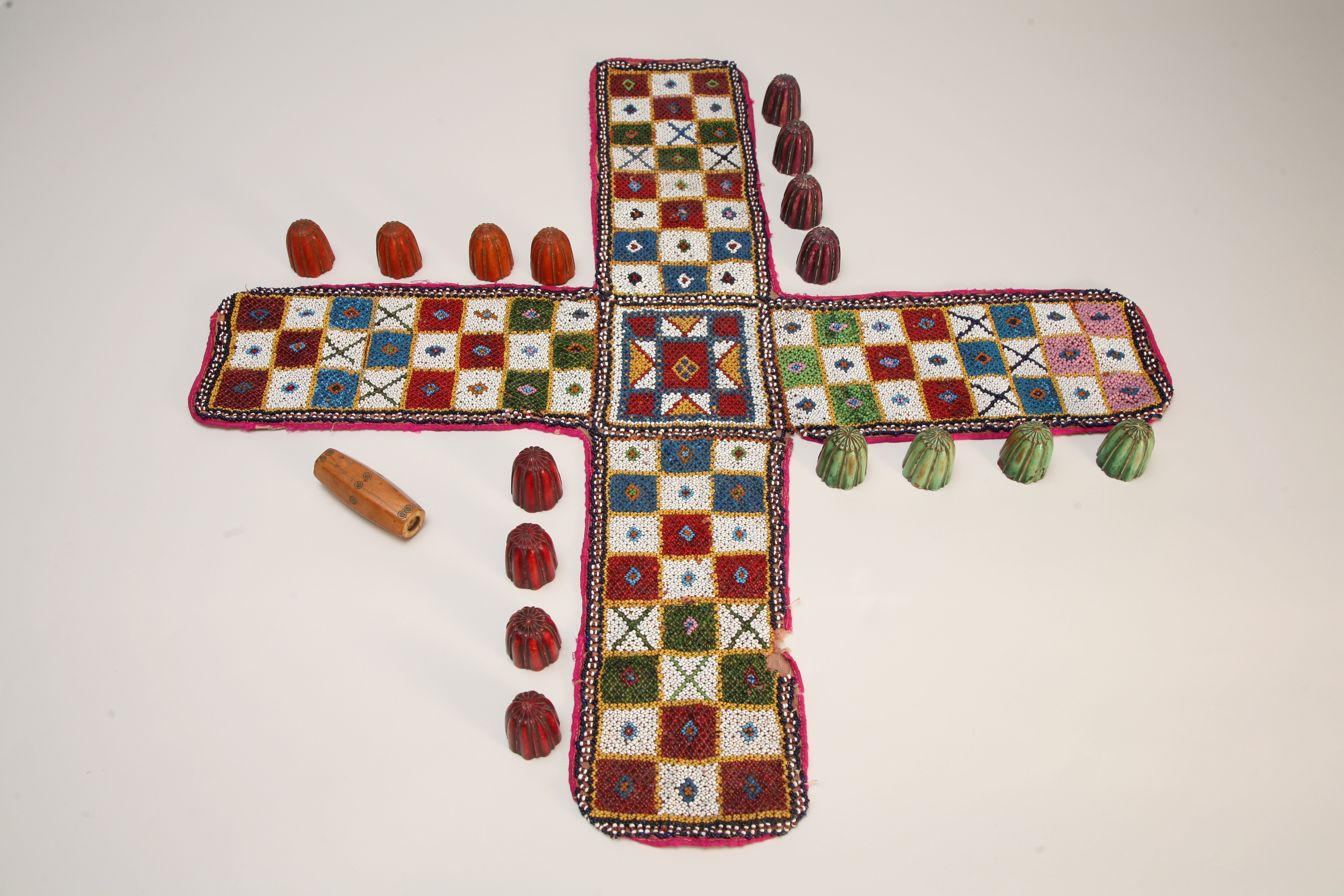
A beaded Pachisi game, The Children's Museum of Indianapolis

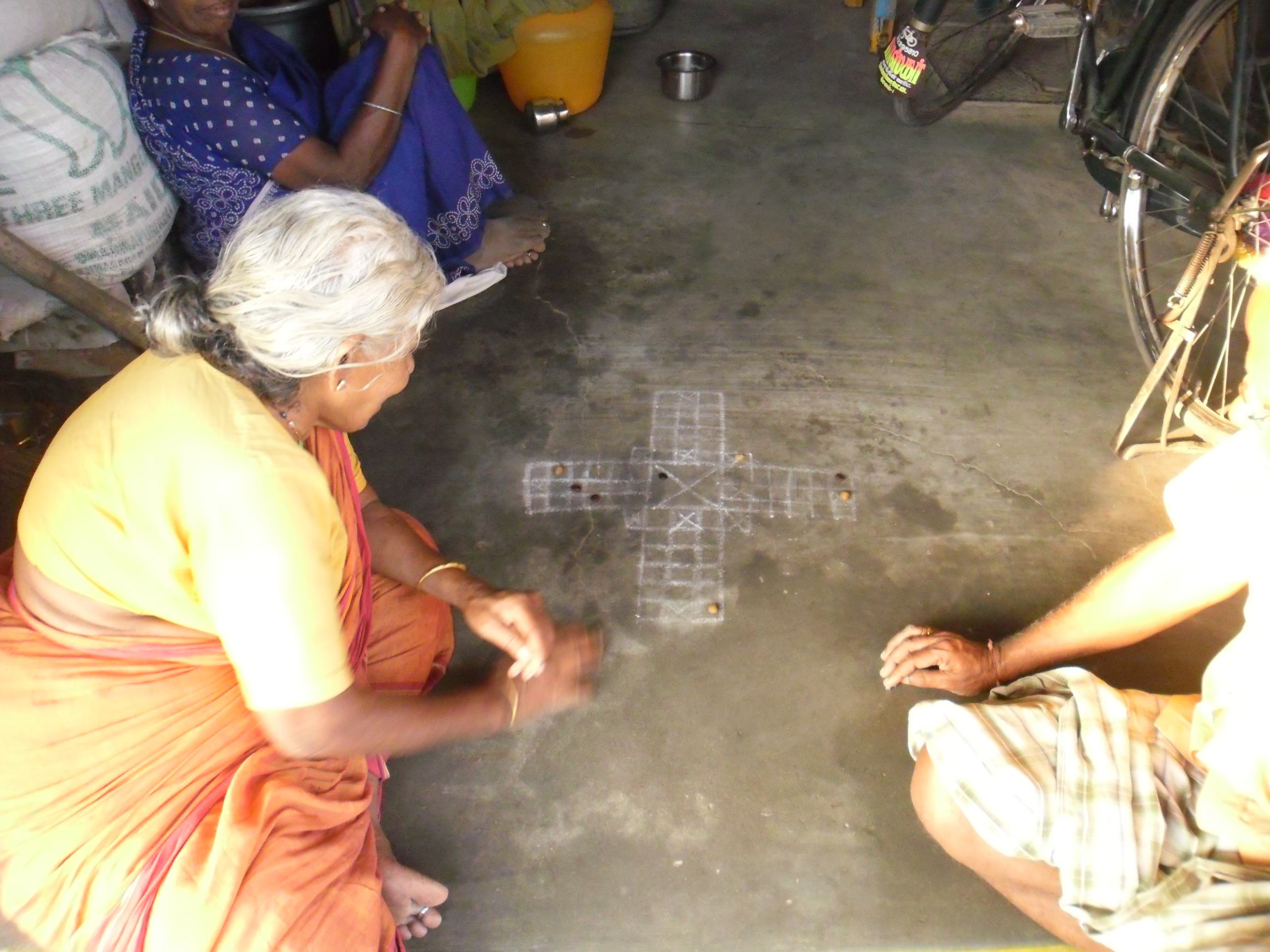
Pachisi being played in Tamil Nadu with tamarind seeds and stones

Each player's objective is to move all four of their pieces completely around the board, counter-clockwise, before their opponents do. The pieces start and finish on the Charkoni.

The playing order is decided by each player throwing the cowries. The player with the highest score starts, and turns continue counter-clockwise around the board. In some versions, each player throws the cowrie shells and pieces cannot move until a 2, 3, or 4 is thrown.

If a 6, 10, or 25 is thrown, the player gets a grace, which enables the player to introduce one of their pieces from the Charkoni onto the board. The player then repeats their turn. In other versions, this includes 10, 25, or 35 to introduce another of their pieces. The newly introduced pawn will be landed on square number 1, which is the very first square for every respective player: here, it is said that on throwing 10 or 25, or 35, you will introduce your new pawn at square number 1, and then you will add the second throw numbers that will be appeared on your cowries and 7, 14 as a grace without the introduction of pieces (here, it should be clear to players that on throwing 7 or 14, you can not introduce your new pawn, you only get an extra turn). A player needs to have at least one piece on the board to be able to throw a 7 or 14.

Simply put, on throwing 10 or 25, or 35, you cannot introduce your new pawn directly to 10 or 25, or 35 number square directly, you have to land the new pawn on square number 1 and then add your remaining numbers. Once your all pawns have entered the game, throwing 10 or 25, or 35 allows you to move the respective numbers ahead.

Each player's first piece may leave the Charkoni on any throw after it has been introduced onto the board. Each player moves their pieces down the centre column of their own arm of the board, then counter-clockwise around the outside columns.

A player may have any number of pieces on the board at one time. Only one piece may be moved with a single throw, or if the player chooses, they can decline to move any piece on a throw. In some versions, a player can move any number of their pieces with a single throw. Also, if the player casts a value higher than they are eligible to move in a single throw, then the player automatically loses that turn.

More than one piece of the same team may occupy a single square (not true for all squares in some versions). However, a piece may not move onto a castle square that is already occupied by an opponent's piece.

If a piece lands on a square (other than a castle square) occupied by any number of the opponent's pieces, those pieces are captured/killed and must return to the Charkoni. Captured pieces may only enter the game again with a grace throw. A player making a capture is allowed another turn (not true in some versions).

In some versions, a player cannot take their pieces back to the Charkoni/home, unless they have captured/killed at least one of the opponent's pieces. Some versions have a rule where if, for example, two players are playing against each other, and Player 1 captures a piece of Player 2, then Player 2, in their immediate turn after being captured for the first time, captures the same piece Player 1 just used to capture, in the same square where the capture took place, then Player 1's capture/kill is invalidated. Player 1 will need to recapture Player 2's piece again to be able to go back to the Charkoni, but Player 2 is free to go ahead to their respective Charkoni unless the above repeats.

A piece completes its trip around the board by moving back up its central column. Returning pieces may be placed on their side in order to distinguish them from pieces that have just entered. A piece can only return to the Charkoni by a direct throw.

Four of the castle squares are placed so they are exactly 25 moves from the Charkoni. A common strategy is for returning pieces to stay on these squares, where they are safe from capture until a 25 is thrown. The pieces can then finish the game directly. This is where the name of the game comes from.

In some versions, where more emphasis is put on the throwing of the cowries, experienced players can cause cowries to land in a specific way, so there are certain other rules to make the game more exciting.

1. If a player has their pieces closer to the end, and does not need a higher value throw, there are ways to nullify the higher value throw.
  1. If the player casts a 10, 25, or 30, the player needs to consecutively throw either 10, 25, or 30 three times (including the original throw) to nullify the higher value throw.
  2. If the player casts a 7, the player must consecutively cast a 7 only 3 times (including the original throw) to nullify the throw.
  3. If the player casts a 14, the player must consecutively cast a 14 only 3 times (including the original throw) to nullify the throw.
2. Since throwing three consecutive throws of 10, 25, or 30 in a single turn nullifies them, players can instead throw a 7 or 14 in between to keep their turn going. EX: A player can throw the following in a single turn: 25, 25, 14, 10, 30, 7, 25, 30, 7, 10, 14, 25, 3.
3. Once all of the player's pieces are introduced onto the board, every time a player throws a 10, 25, or 30, the player must move their piece one additional square, which is known as PYADA. EX: A player casts 25, 25, 3 in their turn, and their pieces can move a total of 53 squares. However, when all the player's pieces have already been introduced onto the board, the player can then move a total of 55 squares (25+25+3+1+1), meaning 2 pyadas extra.

== See also ==
- Ashta Chamma
- Ashte kashte—a game with similar rules
- Chaupur
- Patolli, pre-Columbian Mesoamerican game
- Parqués
- Mensch ärgere Dich nicht
- Aggravation
- Ludo
- Sorry! (game)
- Trouble
