= Coppit =

Board game

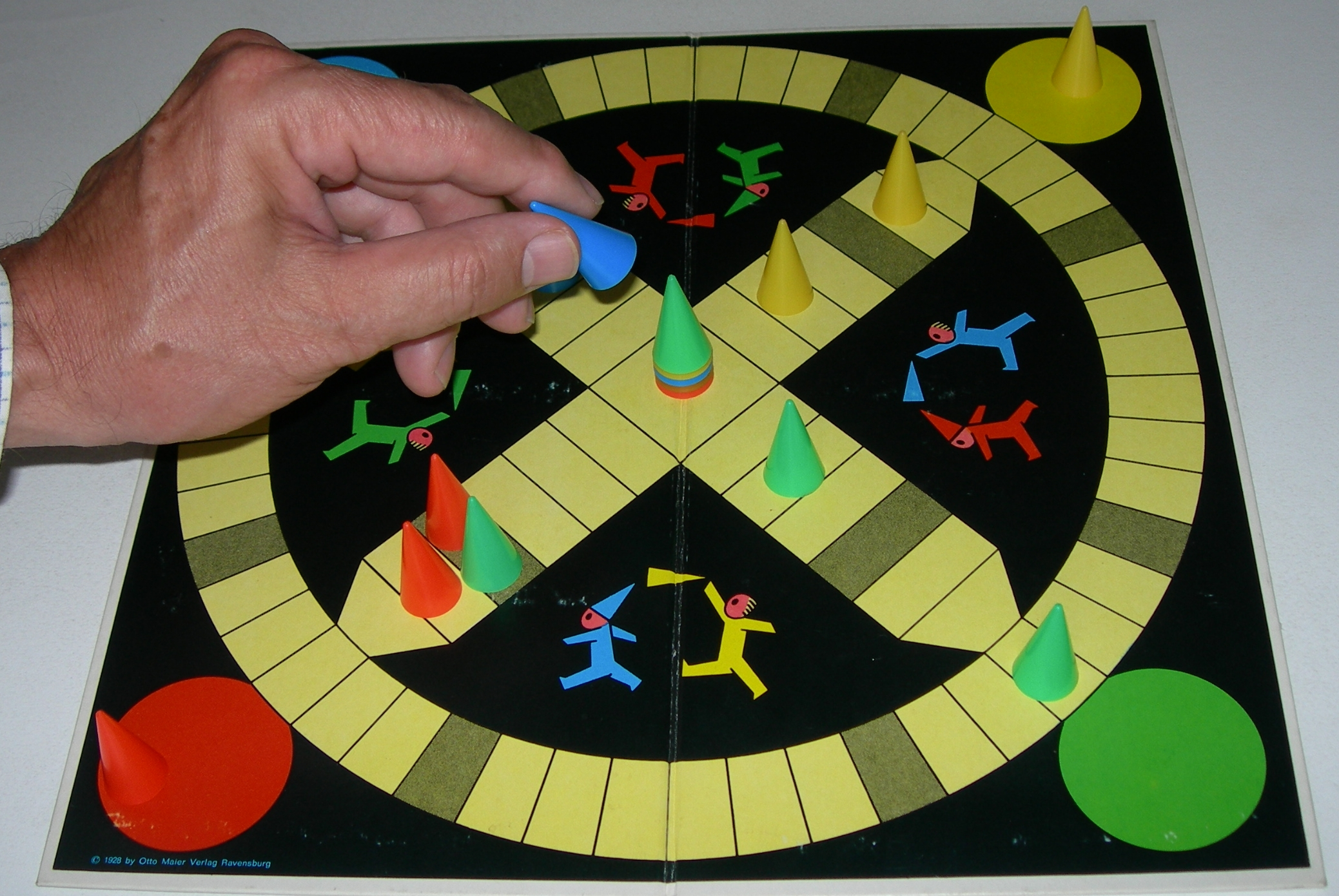
- Board for Fang den Hut! with four spokes; Coppit's board has six spokes
- Years active: Fang den Hut 1927–present Coppit 1964–present
- Genres: Strategy
- Players: 2–6
- Setup time: 2 minutes
- Playing time: 30–60 minutes
- Chance: Die rolls
- Age range: 5 and up

Coppit is a running-fight board game created in 1927 by Otto Maier Verlag which was originally called in German: Fang den Hut (or Capture The Hat in English). It was renamed and has been re-released several times, most notably by the Spear's Games company in 1964. It is a game for two to six players and is based partly on luck with a die and partly on strategy. It is similar to the game Ludo and is nominally a children's game. The emblem on U-995, the world's only remaining German Type VIIC/41 submarine, features two Fang den Hut characters, as seen on the game's board.

== The game ==
Board variants

2–4 players

2–6 players

2–6 players (variant)

Each player has four conical, or hat-shaped, playing pieces all of the same colour that start off in their home 'base'. The object is to move out of your base, capture, or 'cop', your opponent's pieces by landing on top of them, carry them back to your base, and 'imprison' them there. A player can have any number of pieces out of their base at any time. However, while you are moving back to 'base' with a captured piece other players may in turn capture your piece. The winner is the last player to have an uncaptured piece. There are a few squares on the board that are of a different colour to the rest; if a piece is on these squares it cannot be captured.

== Reviews ==
- Games & Puzzles
