= Sorry! (game) =

Board game

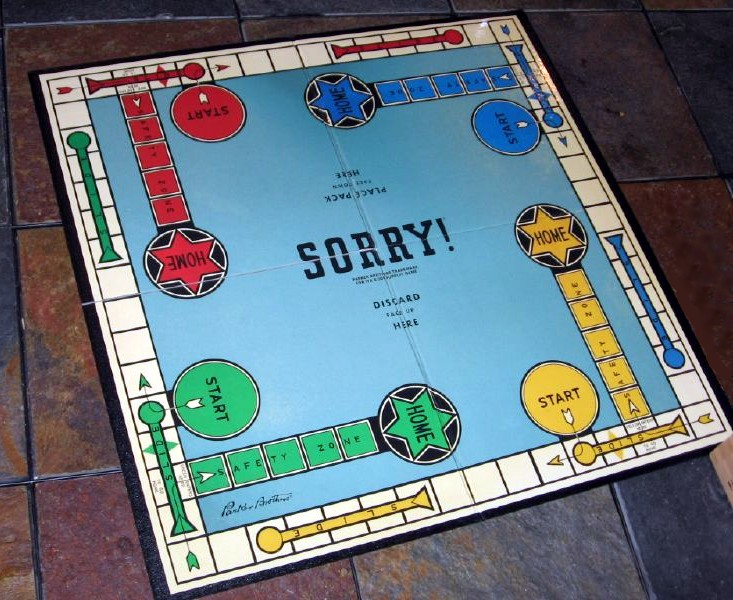
- A 1950s edition of the game
- Publishers: W H Storey & Co; Parker Brothers; Waddingtons; Winning Moves Games USA; Hasbro
- Publication: 1934; 92 years ago
- Players: 2–4
- Setup time: 1–5 minutes
- Chance: High (card drawing)
- Age range: 6 and up
- Skills: Counting; Tactics; Strategy; Probability

Sorry! is a board game that is based on the older game Ludo. Players move their three or four pieces around the board, attempting to get all of their pieces "home" before any other player. Originally manufactured by W.H. Storey & Co in England and later by Hasbro, Sorry! is marketed for two to four players, ages 6 and up. The game title comes from the many ways in which a player can negate the progress of another, while issuing a sarcastic "Sorry!"

== Objective ==
The objective is to be the first player to get all three (four for the modern version) of their colored pawns from their start space, around the board to their "home" space. The pawns are normally moved in a clockwise direction but can be moved backward if directed. Movement of pawns is directed by the drawing of a card.

The board game is laid out in a square with 16 spaces per side, with each player assigned their own coloured Start location and Home locations offset towards the centre, one per side. Four five-square paths, one per colour, lead from the common outer path towards a player's Home and are designated their "Safety Zone". On each side are two "Slides", grouping four or five spaces each.

Older versions of Sorry! contain a coloured "diamond space" directly one space back from each start square; a pawn of the diamond's colour may not move forward over this square. Instead, a pawn of that colour must diverge from the outer space square towards their "Home". The diamond space and corresponding rule were removed from subsequent editions.

== History ==
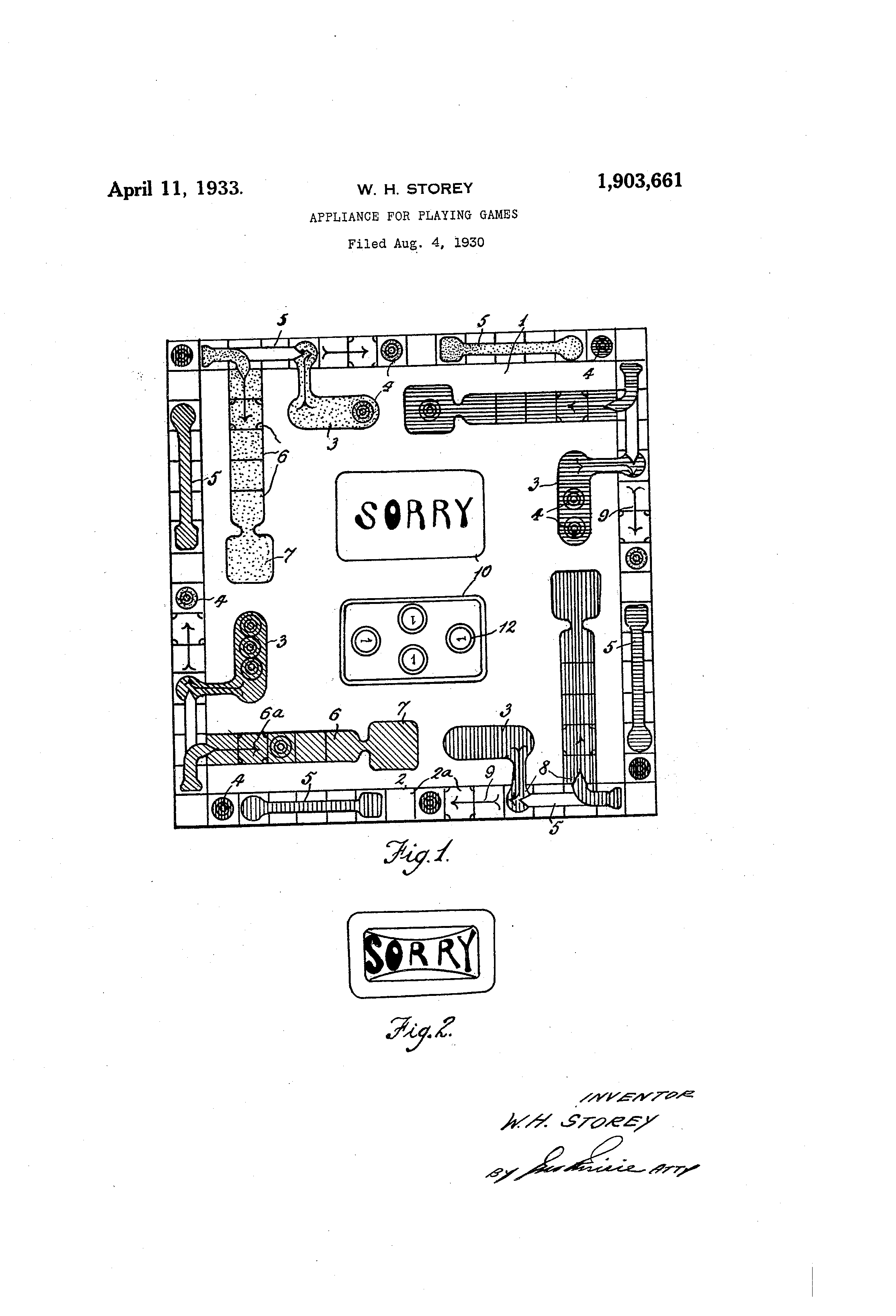
The U.S. patent for the Sorry! board

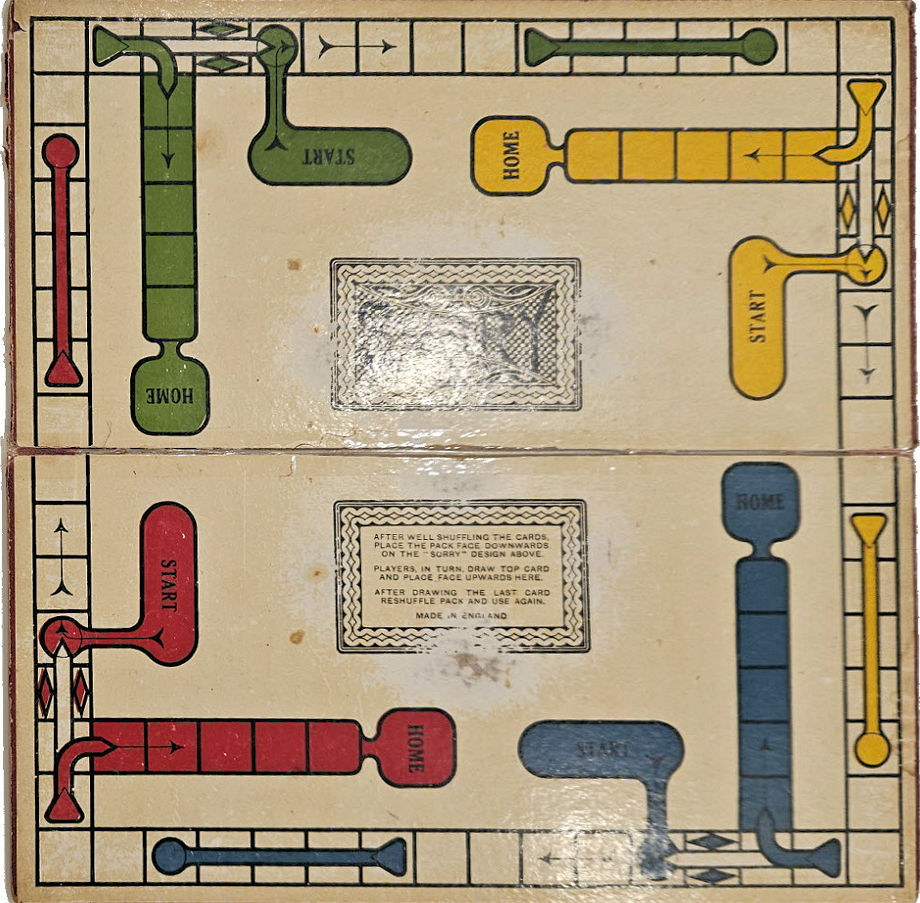
Original Sorry! board from 1934

William Henry Storey of Southend-on-Sea filed for a patent for the game in England, where it was registered as a trade mark on 21 May 1929 (UK number 502898). It was subsequently sold in the United Kingdom by Waddingtons, the British games manufacturer who sold it from 1934.

In the United States, U.S. patent 1,903,661 was filed for Sorry! on 4 Aug 1930 by William Henry Storey. A Canadian patent followed in 1932. The US patent was issued on 11 April 1933. Sorry! was adopted by Parker Brothers in 1934. Hasbro now continuously publishes it.

== Classic rules ==
Each player chooses four pawns of one color and places them in their Start. One player is selected to play first.

Each player, in turn, draws one card from the deck and follows its instructions. To begin the game, all of a player's four pawns are in Start and a player can only move them out onto the rest of the board if they draw a 1, 2 or Sorry! card. A 1 or a 2 places a pawn on the space directly outside of Start (a 2 does not entitle the pawn to move a second space). One must move a pawn if possible; if multiple options are available, they may choose which one to take. If there are no available movements, their turn is forfeited.

A pawn can jump over any other pawn during its move, counting it as one space. However, if a pawn that lands on a square occupied by another player's pawn, the pawn already occupying that square is "bumped" back to its own Start. Players can not bump their own pawns back to Start; if the only way to complete a move would result in a player bumping their own pawn, the player's pawns remain in place and the player loses their turn.

If a pawn lands at the start of a slide (except those of its own color), either by direct movement or as the result of a switch from an 11 card or a Sorry card, it immediately "slides" to the last square of the slide. (In the 2013 version, each slide contains three colors which are different from the color of that board side, so one may slide at the start of a slide with their color.) All pawns on all spaces of the slide (including those belonging to the sliding player) are sent back to their respective Starts.

The last five squares before each player's Home are "Safety Zones", and are specially colored corresponding to the colors of the Homes they lead to. Access is limited to pawns of the same color. Pawns inside the Safety Zones are immune to being bumped by opponents' pawns or being switched with opponents' pawns via 11 or Sorry! cards. However, if a pawn is forced via a 10 or 4 card to move backward out of the Safety Zone, it is no longer considered "safe" and may be bumped by, or switched with, opponents' pawns as usual until it re-enters the Safety Zone.

A pawn may only move to its Home space by exact count; that is, only cards with the correct number of required spaces can bring the pawn Home. Any pawn that is in its Home space stays there for the rest of the game. The first player to get all of their pawns in their Home space wins.

=== Classic cards and function ===
The modern deck contains 45 cards: there are five 1 cards as well as four each of the other cards (Sorry!, 2, 3, 4, 5, 7, 8, 10, 11 and 12). The 6s or 9s are omitted to avoid confusion with each other. The first edition of the game had 44 cards (four of each) and the extra 1 card was soon introduced as an option for quicker play. A 1996 board from Waddingtons had five of each card.

Cards are annotated with the following actions:

1	Either move a pawn from Start or move a pawn one space forward. (In the 2013 edition, the player may also "move ice" before doing so.)
2	Either move a pawn from Start or move a pawn two spaces forward. Drawing a two, even if it does not enable movement, entitles the player to draw again at the end of their turn. (In the 2013 edition, the "draw again" rule is removed, but the player may also "move fire" as part of this card's effect.)
3	Move a pawn three spaces forward.
4	Move a pawn four spaces backward.
5	Move a pawn five spaces forward.
7	Move one pawn seven spaces forward, or split the seven spaces between two pawns (such as four spaces for one pawn and three for another). This makes it possible for two pawns to enter Home on the same turn, for example. The seven cannot be used to move a pawn out of Start, even if the player splits it into a six and one or a five and two. The entire seven spaces must be used or their turn ends. The player cannot move their pawn backwards with a split.
8	Move a pawn eight spaces forward.
10	Move a pawn ten spaces forward or one space backward. If none of a player's pawns can move forward 10 spaces, then one pawn must move back one space.
11	Move eleven spaces forward, or switch the places of one of the player's own pawns and an opponent's pawn. A player who cannot move 11 spaces is not forced to switch and instead can end their turn. An 11 cannot be used to switch a pawn that is in a Safety Zone, or to move a pawn out of Start.
12	Move a pawn twelve spaces forward.
Sorry!	Take any one pawn from Start and move it directly to a square occupied by any opponent's pawn, sending that pawn back to its own Start. A Sorry! card cannot be used on an opponent's pawn in a Safety Zone or at the Home base. If there are no pawns on the player's Start, or no opponent's pawns on any space that can be moved to, the turn ends. (In the 2013 version, the player can also move any of their pawns forward four spaces. If the player cannot move forward 4 after there are no pawns in start or no opponent pawn on any space, their turn is forfeited.)

== Strategy ==
The 7 can be split; it is often possible to do so such that one of the pieces ends up on a slide, thus increasing the value of this card. It also provides an additional opportunity for pawns to get Home, so long as there's another pawn on the board to use up the remaining spaces.

All other things being equal, moves that cause a pawn to end up in front of an opponent's start square are poor choices, due to the high number of cards that allow that opponent to enter. Some feel that leaving a pawn on one's own square just outside "Start" (also known as the "Dot") is a poor position to be in since new pawns are blocked from entering play.

There are numerous strategies and tactics employed by skilled players. One such strategy is to leave the last pawn in the "Start" square and move the other pawns around the board while waiting for a Sorry! card.

Due to the 11 (switching places), 4 (moving backwards, as noted above), and Sorry! (allowing the player to send virtually any pawn back to its start) cards, the lead in the game can change dramatically in a short amount of time; players are very rarely so far behind as to be completely out of the game. This should be considered when playing a Sorry! or an 11.

Leaving one of your pawns near your start space will allow you to move backwards and make it into your safety zone or close enough without having to go all around the board.

Slowing the game down is a risky yet effective move when given the opportunity. Essentially, when a player has the chance to switch with or hit the apparent leader, even though the move will not be to the player's immediate advancement around the board, the move should be made to keep the leader out of "Safety" and more importantly, out of "Home".

== Official variants ==
=== Point-Scoring Sorry! ===
The 1939 edition of the game includes "Point-Scoring Sorry!", a variant where the game is scored at the end. The game also gives players a hand of cards, each player being dealt five at the start of the game. On a player's turn, they play one card from their hand to determine their move, and then draw a replacement card from the remaining deck. If a player cannot play any of their cards, they may discard a card and draw a replacement.

At the end of the game, each player scores a point for every man they got home. The winner also scores one point for every man their opponents had got home, and a bonus of either 24 (if no opponent has a man home), 16 (if no opponent has more than one man home) or 8 (if no opponent has more than two men home).

=== Teams ===
Players can elect to play the game in two teams of two. The team pairings are always colours on opposite sides of the board (i.e. Red and Yellow vs. Blue and Green). The game is then played as if two players had eight pawns each: for example, the yellow player may move a red pawn for any legal move. A 7 card could be split between a yellow pawn and a red one but can still be split between no more than two pieces. However, a partner's pawns are not immune to bumps: if yellow were to draw a Sorry! card with only red pawns on the board, or land on a red pawn's occupied space, yellow would have to bump its teammate.

Once one of the partners has played all of their pieces into home, they continue to draw and play cards on their turn, if possible, for their partner. The first partnership to play all eight pieces in its home wins.

=== Sorry! with Fire and Ice Power-Ups ===
In the 2013 edition, several rules were changed. Two additional items known as Fire and Ice were added, and depending on which card is drawn, can be placed on certain pawns on the board, modifying the playing rules for those pawns. In short, fire gives a pawn the ability to move ahead quickly before the player's turn, and ice stops a pawn from being moved (or removed from play) at all.

Furthermore, each player only has three pawns. A pawn can be moved out from Start upon any positive number card. A Sorry! card gives the alternative option of moving forward 4 spaces. The 2 card no longer allows one to pull another card.

== Video games ==
An electronic gaming version of Sorry! was released in 1998 as a Sorry! computer game. Also, a handheld version was released in 1996.

In the Hoyle Table Games collection of computer games, the game Bump 'Em is similar to Sorry! Pawns are represented as bumper cars, and the board follows a path akin to a freeway cloverleaf instead of a regular square. There are no partnerships allowed.

== Sorry! Express ==
Parker Brothers has released a travel version called Sorry! Express. The game consists of three dice, four home bases, a start base, and sixteen pawns, four in each color. Up to four players can play this game. To play, each player takes a home base and sets it on a different color and all of the pawns are put on the start base no matter how many people are playing. The first person rolls all three dice and gets one of four possibilities for each die:

1. Color pawn – The player takes the corresponding color pawn from the start base and, if it matches up with the color of their home base, puts it in their home section. If not, it is put in their waiting area. When there are no more pawns of a particular color in the Start base and a player rolls that same color, he can take that color pawn from another player's waiting area, not their Home section.
2. Sorry! – Take a pawn from the home section of one player's home base and keep it.
3. Wild Pawn – The player may take any color pawn from the Start base or waiting areas (not the Home section of another player) and keep it.
4. Slide – Change either one's own Home section or someone else's Home section to a different color.

The first person to get four pawns of the same color in their home section wins.

In 2021, Hasbro re-released the game under the name Sorry! Diced!.

== Sorry! Not Sorry! ==
Sorry! Not Sorry! is an adult-themed edition of Sorry! which consisted of the classic game, but added several cards each containing a "Have you ever...?" question. Upon drawing, the player must ask an opponent the fill-in-the-blank question printed on the card. If the opponent answered yes, both the player and opponent move six spaces; if the answer is no, then they can only move three spaces.

This game was part of Hasbro's collection of parody versions of their classic games, which included The Game of Life, Operation, and Clue, which were respectively retitled The Game of Life: Quarter Life Crisis, Botched Operation, and Clue: What Happened Last Night? Lost in Vegas.

== Reception ==
Games magazine included Sorry! in their "Top 100 Games of 1980", praising it as an "old classic in the pachisi mold" that was "Especially recommended for family play" even though "The title gives us cause for regret".

Games magazine included Sorry! in their "Top 100 Games of 1981", praising it as an "exciting race game, ideal for family play" that is "not as mindless as it may appear".

Games magazine included Sorry! in their "Top 100 Games of 1982", noting that many of the movement cards "give interesting options" and that "The game is never dull, and is never decided until the last play."

== Reviews ==
- Family Games: The 100 Best

== See also ==
- List of cross and circle games
- Mensch ärgere Dich nicht
- Ludo
