= Patolli =

Mesoamerican game

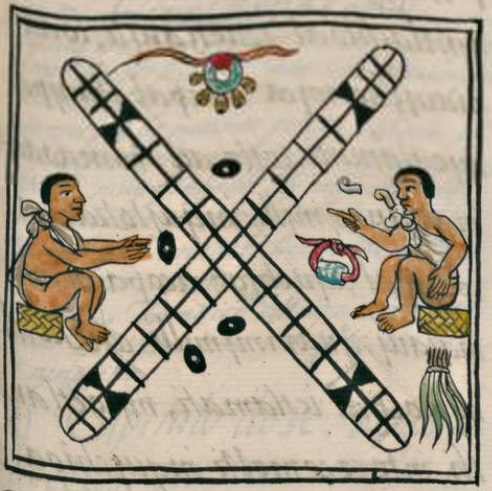
Patolli as depicted in Bernardino de Sahagún's General History of the Things of New Spain. Skilled players had their own game mats and their own playing pieces that they brought in tied cloth bundles.

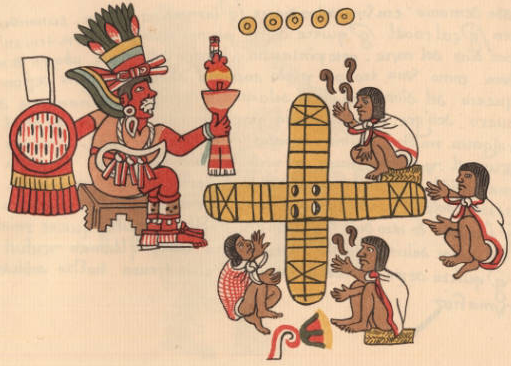
Patolli game being watched by Macuilxochitl as depicted on page 048 of the Codex Magliabechiano.

Patolli (Nahuatl: [paˈtoːlːi]) or patole (Spanish: [paˈtole]) is one of the oldest known games in America. It was a game of strategy and luck played by commoners and nobles alike. It was reported by the conquistadors that Moctezuma Xocoyotzin often enjoyed watching his nobles play the game at court.

== History ==
Patolli and variant or similar games were played by a wide range of pre-Columbian Mesoamerican cultures and were known all over Mesoamerica. While the term Patolli in the strictest sense refers to the Aztec version of the game, known from surviving codices, scholars also use the term to describe games played on similar boards found throughout Mesoamerica whose exact ruleset is unknown. The rectangular boards seen more broadly across Mesoamerica are sometimes called 'proto-patolli' or 'square-patolli' boards.

Versions of Patolli were played by the Teotihuacanos (the builders of Teotihuacan, c. 200 BC - 650 AD), the Toltecs (c. 750 - 1000), the Aztecs (1168 - 1521) and all of the people they conquered (practically all of Mesoamerica, including the Zapotecs and the Mixtecs). The Maya peoples played a version of the game from the early Classic Period (c. 300 AD). Some indigenous board games survived, such as K'uilichi and Quince, the latter of which has also been called 'Patole'. There is linguistic evidence that Spanish conquest spread these squared track games north. However, the cruciform Patolli of the Aztecs was actively suppressed by the Spanish colonizers.

== Players ==
Patolli is a race game with a heavy focus on gambling. Players would meet and inspect the items each had available to gamble. They would bet blankets, maguey plants, precious stones, gold adornments, food or, in extreme cases, their homes, family or freedom. Agreeing to play against someone was not done casually, as the winner of the game would ultimately win all of the opponent's store of offerings.

Each player must have the same number of items to bet at the beginning of the game. The typical number of items to bet is six, because each player has six markers (each time a marker successfully completes a circuit around the board, the opponent is required to hand over one of their items); although any number would be acceptable as long as each player agreed.

Once an agreement is made to play, the players prepare themselves by invoking the god of games, Xōchipilli.

== Game pieces ==
Patolli board and pieces

Several black beans are used as dice. Each bean has one side marked with a round hole exposing the white center of the bean. Thus, tossing the black beans will result in some showing this white mark and others showing a blank side. The name Patolli derived from these beans used as binary lots.

The opposing sides moved colored stones along the board. According to sixteenth-century Dominican friar Diego Duran, the game was played with "doce piedras pequefias las seis coloradas y las seis azules, las cuales pedrezuelas partian entre los que jugaban [twelve little stones, six red and six blue pebbles split between those playing]"

The game board has 52 casas or houses arranged in an "X" shape. The game board was traditionally painted onto a reed mat and Patolli players were reported to travel with a the game rolled up along with a cloth bag of black bean lots. Duran wrote, "Andaban los taures de este juego siempre con la estera debajo del sobaco, y con los dados atados k un paniito como algunos taures de este tiempo, que siempre andan apercibidos con los naypes en las calzas de tablage en tablage. [The game's players always carried their mat under their armpit, and their dice tied in a small bundle, like certain gamblers of our time, who always carry their playing card in their breeches as they move from one gaming table to another.]"

== Gameplay ==
The object of patolli is to move six game pieces to the end of a board composed of specially-marked squares. In order to complete a round, a player must get all six of their game markers from their starting queue to the ending square on the game board before the other player. The ultimate goal of the game is for a player to win all of the opponent's treasure; to do this, the players may need to play more than one round of the game.

=== Movement ===
The players take turns tossing the beans onto the game area. In order for a player to get one of their markers on the game board, one bean would have to land with its hole face up and all the others face down (getting a score of one). Once a player has done so, the player places one of their game markers from their starting queue onto the starting square of the game board.

If a player already has a marker on the game board, they can move it forward (clockwise around the "X" shape) the same number of spaces as there are holes showing from the toss. A toss showing five holes, however, allows the player to move their marker ten spaces forward. A player cannot move a marker onto a space that already has a marker (belonging to either player) on it. If the player cannot move any of their markers because they would overshoot the ending square or land on a spot occupied by another marker, they lose their turn.

=== Special areas ===
There are several specially-marked areas on the game board:

- The four squares in the middle of the "X": Landing on an opponent's marker in this area is allowed, and if a player does so, the opponent's marker is removed from the game board and put back into the opponent's starting queue. The opponent is then required to give up one of their treasures to the landing player.
- The two dark triangular spaces near the end of each arm of the "X": A player who lands on one of these triangular spaces must give up one of their treasures to the opponent.
- The two squares at the end of each arm of the "X": A player who lands on one of these squares takes another turn.

=== Ending the round ===
If a player's marker reaches the ending square by exact count, the marker is removed from the board and the opponent must give up one of their treasures to the player. The round is over once one player gets all six of their markers off the board this way.

As soon as a player has won all of their opponent's treasures, the game is over and that player is the winner. If no player has won the game by the end of a round of play, the players must play another round.

In addition, if a player's toss results in all the beans standing on their sides, the game is over and the player automatically wins all the goods bet by both parties.

=== Macuilxochitl's role in the game ===
According to the Magliabechiano codex, the god of games, Macuilxochitl, was considered to be participating in the game. To represent this, there is a special area near the game board reserved for offerings to Macuilxochitl. A player must place one of their treasures into this space each time their toss results in a score of zero (no holes showing). After each round of play, the winner of the round receives all the treasure from this space as a gift from Macuilxochitl.

== See also ==
- Bul
