= Bul (game) =

Mesoamerican board game

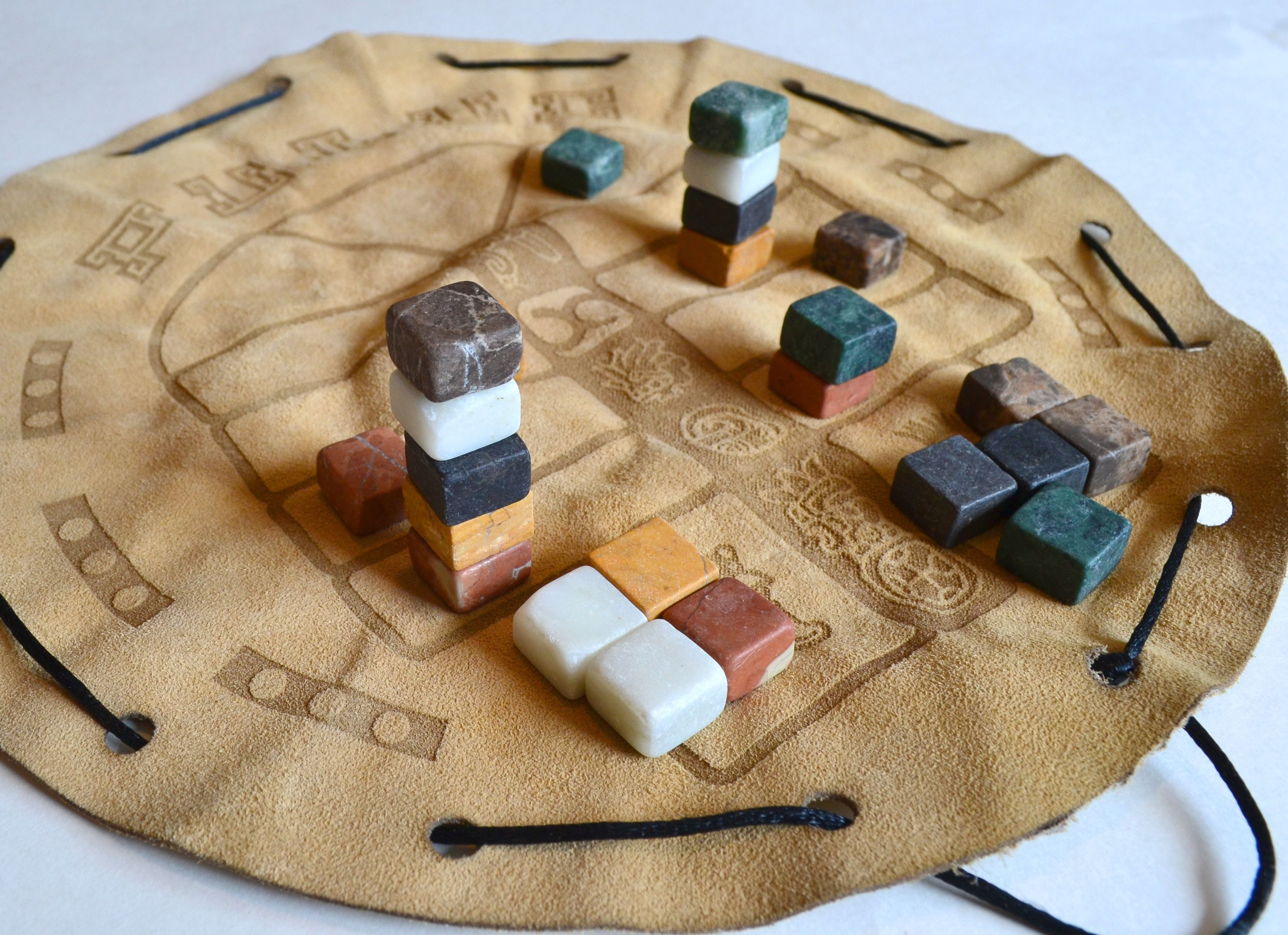
A game of Bul in progress

Bul (also called Buul, Boolik or Puluc) is a running-fight board game originating in Mesoamerica, and is known particularly among several of the Maya peoples of Belize and the Guatemalan highlands. It is uncertain whether this game dates back to the pre-Columbian Maya civilization, or whether it developed in the post-colonial era after the arrival of the Spanish conquistadores.

== Descriptions of the game ==
Stewart Culin described the game in the 24th Annual Report of the Bureau of American Ethnology: Games of North American Indians published in 1907. R. C. Bell referred to the game in Board and Table Games from Many Civilizations. Bell's description is based on Karl Sapper's published account. Lieve Verbeeck, a linguist studying Mayan language, witnessed the modern version of the game being played by Mopan and Kekchi Maya in Belize:

But neither can I give you hard evidence that the corn game, as it is now still played by the Mopan and K'ekchi' Mayans, (who are neighbors), was known in ancient times. There is linguistic evidence that the ancient Mayans used to play games of chance. The name BUL occurs in several Mayan languages and always means to play with dice. Sometimes, by extension, it means "to lose with gambling". There is archaeological evidence that the Maya used square- and oval-shaped patolli boards. There are many sites throughout the Maya area where archaeologists found patterns of patolli boards carved in floors or benches. Unfortunately, there are no BUL boards found (yet??) ... Anyway I don't have any thrilling stories for you about famous BUL contests in ancient times. Only three Maya manuscripts were safeguarded from the Spanish conquerors. Up till now no reference to Maya board games was found. Of course, there are a few pictures displaying priests throwing corn or seeds for divination ... Culin's version of BUL is quite accurate. I observed the game being played by 10 men. They placed 25 grains of corn in a row. The game lasted for 3 hours because they played 5 variants.

== History ==
It is not known exactly when the game was developed or what the original rules were as very few records survived the invasion by the conquistadors between the 15th and 17th centuries. Stewart Culin organised the games in his anthology into those he thought had an influence from Europe in their creation. Bul is not listed among these, and in his opinion the game must have developed before Europeans arrived in Central America.

== Rules ==
There are a variety of ways to play the game. Bell describes a two-player game. Culin reports the game as played by "any even number" of players. Verbeeck describes the game as played by two teams of at least four players per side. The overall objective is to capture and subsequently kill the counters or "men" of the opposition.

The playing area is divided into a track or road by items placed in a row, with the game's spaces being the gaps between the items. The two sides have a home field at either end of the road. The players place an equal number of game pieces (made from flat stones, small twigs, leaves, paper, fabric, or any stackable and visually distinct material) in their respective home fields.

The movement of the players' counters is determined by the roll of four binary dice or bul, made from corn kernels. These are blackened on one side, either burned or marked with charcoal. Thus, they land showing either a black face or an unmarked side up. The number of marked faces showing determines how many spaces a player's counter can move:

Marked faces up	Spaces to move
1	1
2	2
3	3
4	4
0 (all unmarked)	5

Players roll the bul and move one of their men the corresponding number of spaces on the road. Bell's two-player rules prevent a counter from moving to a space already occupied by a friendly counter. If no legal move is available from a roll, the player is simply skipped for that turn. Other rules allow multiple teammates' pieces per space, making those men vulnerable to a single capture.

When a player's counter lands on the same space as an enemy, the enemy man is captured and is no longer controlled by the enemy. The enemy counter is placed beneath the capturing counter. If the capturing counter moves, its prisoners are moved with it. If a counter lands on an enemy that already has prisoners, it captures that man as well as its prisoners, and these are placed beneath it.

Once a counter moves off the board, it and any of the controlling player's men beneath it are liberated or returned to the home field to be played again. Its prisoners are removed from the road, or killed. The game ends when a team runs out of men to enter the track, and the winning side counts its removed prisoners. In Bell's rules, the game ends when the losing side has no more men to move on the road.

There are regional variations reported in the game's play. For example, German explorer Karl Sapper records the counter always moving in the same direction with one throw of the bul per turn between two players. In contrast, Verbeeck reports a longer, more complex game played between two teams, with players taking two throws of the bul per turn and continuing to roll for the surviving men on their team once all of a player's own men have been captured. Culin reports two throws per turn as well. The use of two rolls of four binary lots per turn is also found in another surviving Indigenous game, K'uilichi Chanakua, played by the Purépecha in Mexico. In the version played by teams, Verbeeck says that the individuals "can only have one movable man at a time on the board."

Verbeeck also describes bul as being played in five successive rounds, each using a different variant of the rules:

1. with movement that reverses towards the home field upon capturing a prisoner;
2. with counters immediately exiting the field upon capturing a prisoner;
3. with players able to move their counters in either direction;
4. with Sapper's reported opposed movement; and
5. with a k’aak’il or a 'fire' in the center space of the road that kills any controlled men or prisoners landing on it but allows players to return home immediately if capturing men between their home field and the fire.

== Variants ==
Certain aspects of the game vary between accounts, players, and regions:

Aspect	Variation
Road length	The number of items used to mark the road can vary, producing shorter or longer tracks. Historical accounts use different numbers, including ten in Sapper, fifteen in Culin, and twenty or more in Verbeeck.
Counters	Five counters per player are reported in Culin, Sapper, and Verbeeck. Counters may be made from a broad range of materials. Either all counters or a limited number (such as one per player) may move onto the track.
Throws	Once per turn, or twice per turn.
Movement after capture	Variously reported as continuing toward the opposing home field, reversing towards the capturing player's own field, moving in either direction, or immediately leaving the track upon capture.
