= Zohn Ahl =

Roll-and-move board game

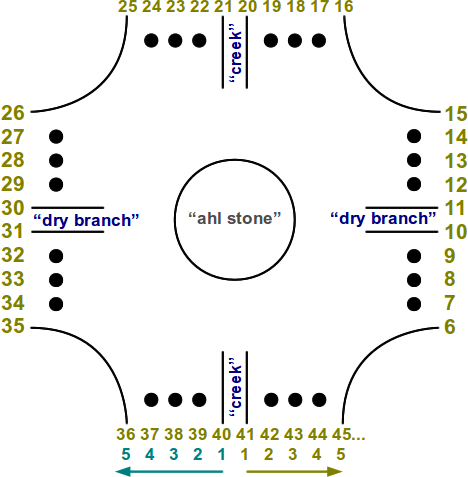
A schematic of the Zohn Ahl board, showing full circuit for one player, and the first 5 spaces for the other

Zohn Ahl (Kiowa: tsòñ:áugyà) is a roll-and-move board game played by the Kiowa Indians of North America. It is often cited as a typical representative of many similar Native American games. It is often equated (or possibly confounded) with Tsoñä ("awl game"), also played by the Kiowa.

== Terminology ==
Note that the two names create an interesting but coincidental sonic overlap: Zohn = "creek," a feature of the board; and Ahl = "wood," the term for the dice. Whereas Tsoñä means the "awl game," referring to the two awls used as playing pieces. But "ahl" and "awl" have no relation to each other, one being a Kiowa word, the other English, and signifying different objects. So while the game may be referred to as "Zohn Ahl" or "the Awl Game" or even "the Ahl Game" (meaning "the stave game"), "Zohn Awl" would be incorrect.

== Equipment ==
- Board: the distinctive 40-space board (see illustration) was marked on a cotton cloth or a blanket.
- Lots: four staves (ahl). These are split sticks, flat on one side and round on the other (thus semicircular in section), ranging anywhere from about 4 to 10 inches long, and around 3/8 to 1/2 inch in diameter. Three of these staves are marked on their flat sides with grooves painted red; the fourth is marked with a groove painted blue, black, or green. In the Tsoñä account, this specially marked fourth stave is called sahe ("green"). The round sides of the two types are usually also distinguished, though this is not necessary for gameplay. Willow and elm are mentioned as materials.
- Flat stone: the "ahl stone," is placed in the center of the board, and the staves are vigorously bounced against it for each throw.
- Pieces: two awls, one for each player or team, mark progress around the circuit.
- Counters: eight sticks (or any even number) used to keep score.

== Gameplay ==
The game is played between either two players or two equal teams. Each side begins with half the counters and its awl at its own space 1, the awls moving in opposite directions, one side clockwise, the other counterclockwise (see illustration). A player throws the four staves and moves their awl the indicated number of spaces, and if appropriate, throws again (see table). The fact that "throwing" is said to go around the circle counterclockwise (which would be meaningless in alternate turns) may indicate that, when playing in teams, all players on one side throw and move, followed by all players on the other side in their turn.

The four two-sided staves, one with a specially marked flat side (sahe, "green"), can fall in eight possible configurations, yielding the indicated values:

| Flat sides up | Value | Value with sahe |
|---|---|---|
| 0 | 10+ | NA |
| 1 | 1 | 1+ |
| 2 | 2 | 2 |
| 3 | 3 | 3+ |
| 4 | NA | 6+ |

("+" means "and throw again". "NA" mean "not applicable"; the throw is not possible.)

When a player lands on their space 20, the near bank of the "creek," they "fall in": their side loses one counter and the awl is returned to the beginning space 1. (Note that an opponent's space 20 is the far side of the creek, and safe.) Likewise when a player lands on their opponent's awl, the opponent is "whipped" back to their space 1, and loses one counter. The "dry branch" spaces have no special effect, and function just as any other space.

When a player completes a full circuit with their awl, they win one counter, and continue around in the same direction, moving the full value of their throw. If, however, their throw causes them to land on their space 40, they fall into the creek and are returned to space 1, losing one counter.

When one side wins all the counters, they have won the game.

It is possible, but not definitely known, that Lizzie Magie who devised the game later marketed as Monopoly was partly inspired by the board of Zohn Ahl, and used it for a game with very different rules.
