= Yunnori =

Traditional Korean board game

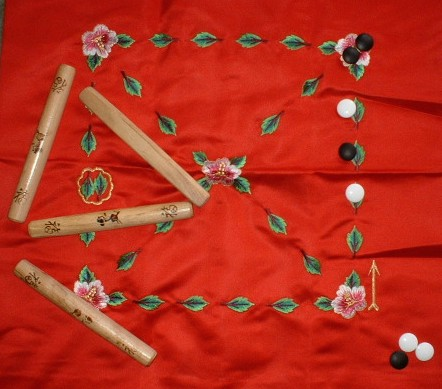
- A game of yut with the sticks cast as a do

Korean name
- Hangul: 윷; 윷놀이
- RR: yut; yunnori
- MR: yut; yunnori

Yunnori (Korean: 윷놀이), also known as yutnori, yut, nyout and yoot, is a traditional board game played in Korea, especially during Korean New Year. The game is also called cheoksa (척사; 擲柶) or sahui (사희; 柶戲).

== Origin ==
Yunnori finds its roots in Korea's Three Kingdom Period (57 BCE – 668 CE). While its exact origin remains uncertain, evidence of yunnori has been documented in various historical records spanning Korea, China, and Japan. A claim by Korean historian and activist Chae Ho-shin suggests its descent from the Korean Kingdom Gojoseon in 2333 BC, as mentioned in a book by Buddhist monk Ilyeon (Park et al., 2013). Petroglyphs bearing records of yunnori during the Joseon era were discovered in the mountains of the Korean Peninsula and Manchuria. Surprisingly, yut carvings were also found in a Buddhist temple and were most likely designated prayer sites.

Historians draw connections between yunnori and a Chinese chess game called chupu/jeopo from the 1400s to 1860s, highlighting similarities in their four-token systems. Notably, Goryeo-era documents illustrated yut boards and their 29 stations. Yunnori's presence is also depicted in traditional Korean paintings (minhwa).

== Cultural and astronomical meanings ==
Initially, yunnori originated as a religious ritual embodying yin-yang principles and the 28 asterisms. Aligned with East Asian astronomy, the game's structure reflected the heavens, earth, four seasons, and the length of the day. Yunnori sticks, with flat and round sides, symbolize yin and yang, while the game's leftward direction mirrors the counterclockwise movement of the Big Dipper stars. This symbolic representation signifies sanctity and a departure from mundane daily life. The incorporation of yut in tombstones reinforces its celestial symbolism, expressing wishes to the heavens.

Yunnori involves five key moves – do, gae, geol, yut, and mo – according to Ilyeon's interpretation, representing the five tribes of the Gojoseon era. Geol was possibly the king's tribe, while the others symbolized four livestock animals – pigs (do), dogs (gae), cows (yut) and horses (mo).

== Equipment ==
The board (말판; malpan) is normally made of stitched cloth. The modern board is a rectangular shape, but historically there was also a round variation. There are four straight courses and two diagonal ones. Each of the straight courses comes with five stations, the diagonal ones have five stations, too, but one is shared. This brings the number of stations to twenty-nine in total. The board is also known to sometimes be drawn onto the floor.

Instead of dice, yut-sticks are used, similar to those used in the Egyptian board game Senet. There are two kinds of yut-sticks: jangjak yut (장작 윷) and bam yut (밤 윷). Jangjak yut are made of wood. There are four sticks of about 15 cm in length and from 2 cm to 3 cm in diameter. These sticks are split into halves. Chestnut-wood is most commonly used, but birch-wood is also common. These woods are chosen for their weight and the fresh sound they make when playing. Bam yut, on the other hand, are wooden sticks of about 3 cm in length. They have a diameter of about 1 cm, and also are split into halves. The bam yut are played in a small bowl, shaken in the palm, and then released.

There are small tokens (marks) used for the game, called mal (말; lit. 'horse'). There are four tokens for each team, although there are no common rules what a token can be made of. The only rule is that the mals of the opponent teams must be clearly distinguishable. Apart from black and white plastic tokens generally found today, common mals are coins, buttons, small pebbles, or even chess beads (both from Western chess and Korean chess). When choosing the mal, some Koreans consider its speed, because the faster a horse runs, the better it is thought to run.

=== Yut sticks ===
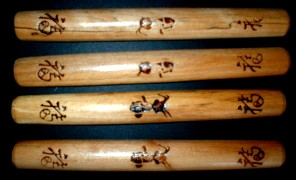
Yut sticks (Jang-jak), measuring 17.5 cm

Scoring: The number of points followed by a schematic representation of the sticks, as well as the name of the particular throw

The sticks are binary lots cast to determine how far a token can advance. The score is determined by counting the sticks that are over, and those that are up. Each combination has a name. One stick over (flat side up) and three sticks up (round side up) is called "do" (도, pig). Two sticks up and two sticks over is called "gae" (개, dog). One stick up and three sticks over is called "geol" (걸, sheep). All sticks over is called "yut" (윷, cow), whereas all sticks up is called "mo" (모, horse). A "do" is worth one space advancement, a "gae" is worth two space advancement, a "geol" is worth 3 space advancement, "yut" is worth 4 space advancement, and "mo" is worth 5 space advancement. When the sticks come to the result of either "yut" or "mo", the player has another chance of throwing the sticks up again (optional- some people prefer not to play with this rule). If a player gets "yut" or "mo" consecutively, then they must play (throw) again.

== Game rules ==
The game is played between two partners or two teams who play in turns, sometimes it is played with more teams. There is no limit in the number of participants in a game, which means that the game can be played by a considerable group. When played with large groups it is not uncommon for some group members never to cast the sticks: they still participate by discussing the strategy.

The start of the game is determined by each team casting the yut-sticks. The team with the highest score starts first. Each team then casts the sticks in turn, then moves a mal according to the score achieved. One turn usually consists of only one cast. However, a player achieving a yut or mo earns an extra cast for the turn; if the player casts a yut or mo at the second cast, they earn an extra cast again, so there is no limit to the number of times a player can cast again before the end of a turn, provided they keep casting yuts or mos. The respective scores can be played separately if wished, each given to another mal (or group of mals, see below), but a score earned from one cast cannot be split into two moves—for example, a geol (advance three steps) cannot be split into a do (one step) and a gae (two steps).

The four possible courses of the game of Yut

As long as there are mals outside the board, a team can either put a new mal onto the board according to the scores it got, or move a mal already on the board. The mals travel around the board and can move forward only. However, when landing on one of the big stations (in the corner and the centre), the team can choose to take the shorter way should they wish to. There are four possible courses, the default course being longest one with no abbreviation (No. 4).

If a mal lands on a station occupied by the opponent's team, the opponent's mal is removed from the course and returned to the starting position, and the current player is allowed to cast again.

If a mal lands on a station occupied by the own team, these mals can form a group and travel together from that point on. However, this bears a risk: If an opponent lands their mal on a station occupied by a group of mals of the opponent, all mals in the group are removed from the course.

For example, if one casts two yuts and one do at their first turn in the game, possible moves would include (see The Stations below for the station names):

- Put a mal on the board at the yut station (uses the first yut score); advance to mo (uses the do score), then to sok-yut (uses the second yut).
- Put a mal on the board at the yut station (uses first yut score); put another mal on the board at the same yut station (uses the second yut score), causing the two mals to move together from then on; advance them to mo (uses the do).
- Put a mal on the board at the yut station (uses the first yut); advance to duet-geol (uses the second yut), then to duet-yut (uses the do).

The game is won by the team who brings all their mals home first, that is complete the course with all their mals. A course is completed if a mal passes the station where the game is started (cham-meoki). Landing on cham-meoki is no finish, but any score going "beyond" this station completes a home run. Yut is often played for three or more wins.

=== Special rules ===
The game is sometimes enhanced by labeling one, two, or three of the yut stick on their flat side. The Seoul rule can be played if one of the sticks is labelled Seoul (서울). If this stick is the only one facing down (do so that the letters Seoul can be read), a mal can be placed directly into the centre (bang), which in this case is called Seoul. If all the mals are already on the course, this counts as a do. The Busan rule is similar. One of the yut sticks is labelled Busan (부산). Rather than to the centre, the mal travels directly to the far corner (mo). Again, this only applies if this is the only stick facing down, and not all mals are on the course already.

There is also the back rule, where one of the sticks is labelled back (후퇴). If this is the only stick facing down, one of the mals has to go back one step. Depending on the rules used, if none of the mals are on the course, then this is counted as either a do or a skipped turn. Alternatively, if the do rule is not being used, the other most common rule is for a mal to be placed onto the arrow next to the start. The mal remains there until another back is cast. In this case, however, the mal completes the course at once. Furthermore, if a mal is placed on the do spot, and then gets a back, then they will be on the cham-meoki spot and then will exit the malpan when a do, gae or geul, yut or mo is thrown. Another back will put them on the nal-yut spot.

== Social influence ==
Given its rich history and symbolism, Yunnori has evolved into a popular traditional game among Korean families and friends, particularly during Seollal and Jeongwol Daeboreum – the first and fifteenth days of the new Lunar Year. Beyond entertainment, Yunnori serves as a means of predicting the future through pyeon yut and yut jeom. Pyeon yut forecasts agricultural abundance when played in groups, while yut jeom focuses on individual fortune-telling. Traditional beliefs associated with Yunnori extend to agricultural predictions, as documented in the Records of Seasonal Festivities around the Capital (Yeolyangsesigi) playing Yunnori past the fifteenth day of the lunar calendar would not ensure a fruitful year ("Seasonal Customs and Traditional Recreation," 2020).

The Australian film and theatre group, Yut Art, takes its names from the game as a result of the excitement and crowd participation associated with its activities.

== The stations ==
Yut board (mal-pan) with the different stations

Each station of the gameboard has its own name, although they are obscure to most Koreans. It is thought that the outer stations symbolize heaven, and the inner square, the earth. The whole board can be also interpreted as a reflection of universal symmetry and celestial procession, reflecting elements of Korean shamanism.

The mid-Joseon writer Gim Munpyo described the Yut board as symbolising the circle of the cosmos, with the North Star in the centre, surrounded by 28 constellations.

== Fortune-telling ==
According to the Dongguksesigi (literally meaning a Book on Eastern Country's Annual Observances), a book listing 22 Korean annual observances, on New Year's Eve or New Year's Day, there was a game of fortune-telling good and bad with a hand-thrown out of yut. The possible combinations of yut are do, gae, geol, yut, and mo, but yut and mo hit the same thing. As a result, there are 64 fortune tellings in total, and in each case, matters to be careful about behavior and the answer for the year's luck are set.

== See also ==
- Lambs and tigers
- Korean culture
- List of cross and circle games
