= Binary lot =

Castable objects with two distinct faces for generating random outcomes

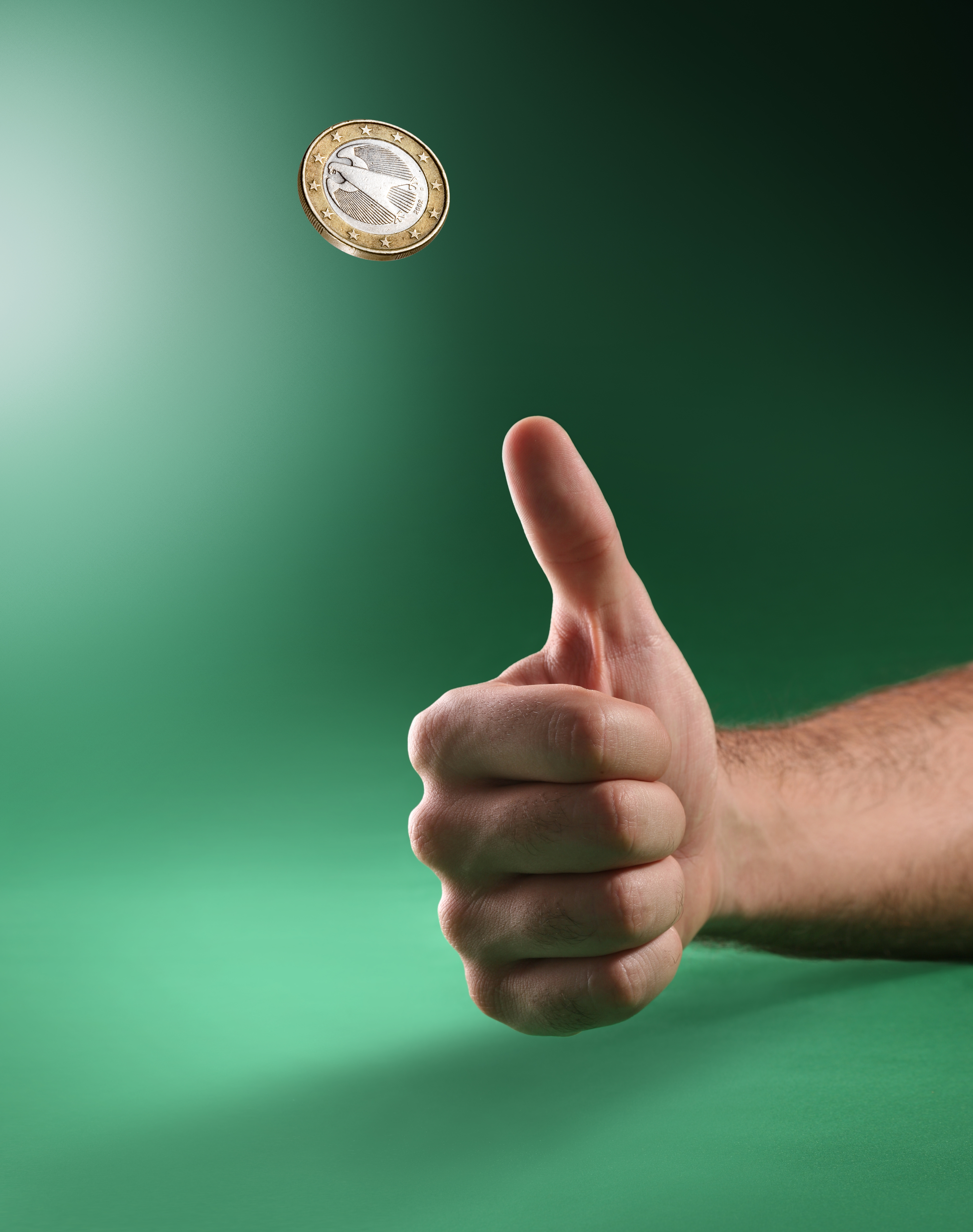
A coin toss — a common method of casting a binary lot

A binary lot is an object that, when cast, comes to rest with one of two distinct faces uppermost. These can range from precisely machined objects like modern coins which produce balanced results (each side coming up half the time over many casts), to naturally occurring objects like cowrie shells which may produce a range of unbalanced results depending upon the species, individual, and even circumstances of the cast.

Binary lots may be used for divination, impartial decision-making, gambling, and game playing, the boundaries of which (as David Parlett suggests) can be quite blurred. They may be cast singly, yielding a single binary outcome (yes/no, win/lose, etc.), but often they are cast multiply, several in a single cast, yielding a range of possible outcomes.

== Coins ==
Unlike most binary lots — which are typically cast multiply affording a variety of possible outcomes — coins are most often cast (flipped or spun) singly, resulting in a simple yes/no, win/lose outcome. Both the lot and its outcome are binary. Further, a coin's two sides are very nearly symmetrical, so that they can each be expected to appear reasonably close to 50% of the time, unlike cowries, half-round staves, and some other forms of binary lots.

The coin flipping game now known as Heads or Tails is ancient, going back at least to classical Greece, where Aristophanes knew it as Artiasmos, and classical Rome, where it was known as Caput aut Navis ('Head or Ship'), the two images on either side of some Roman coins. In the medieval period, various nations stamped various images on their coins, so that Italians played Fiori o Santi ('Flower or Saint'), Spaniards played Castile or Leon, Germans played Wappen oder Schrift ('Weapon or Writing'), and the French played Croix ou Pile ('Cross or Reverse').

Whereas most of these terms describe the images stamped on both sides, both the earlier English Cross and Pile (equivalent to the French, above) and the current English Heads or Tails describe only one side. Pile does not describe what is pictured: it merely indicates 'the reverse side'; likewise Tail indicates 'the side opposite the head'.

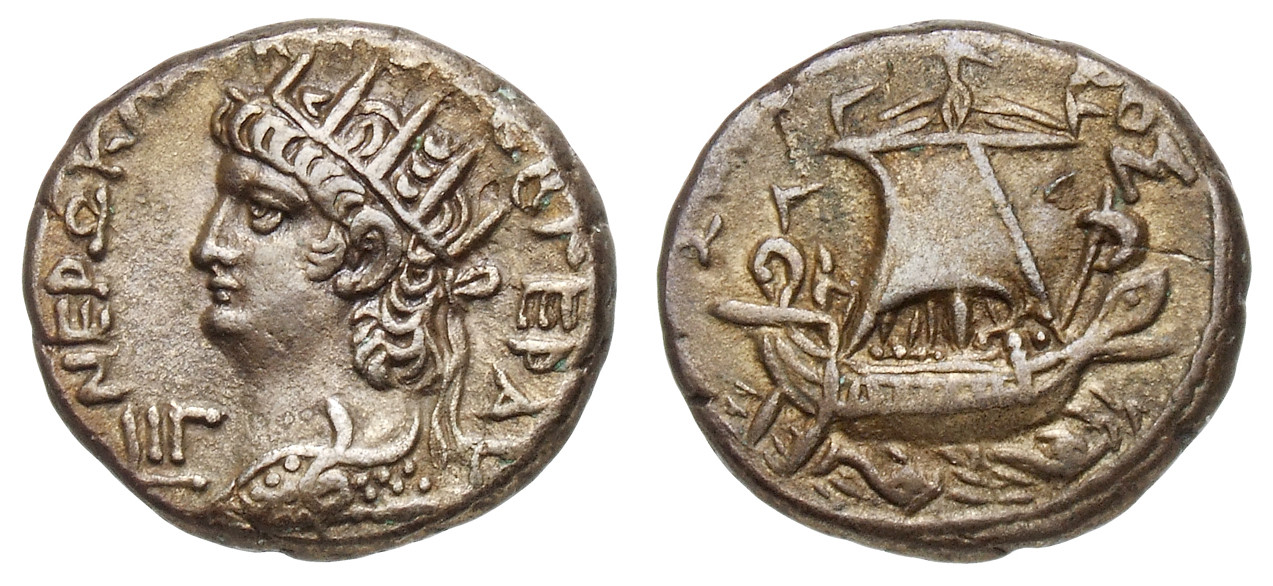
Roman coin, displaying caput, 'head' (of Nero) and navis, 'ship'

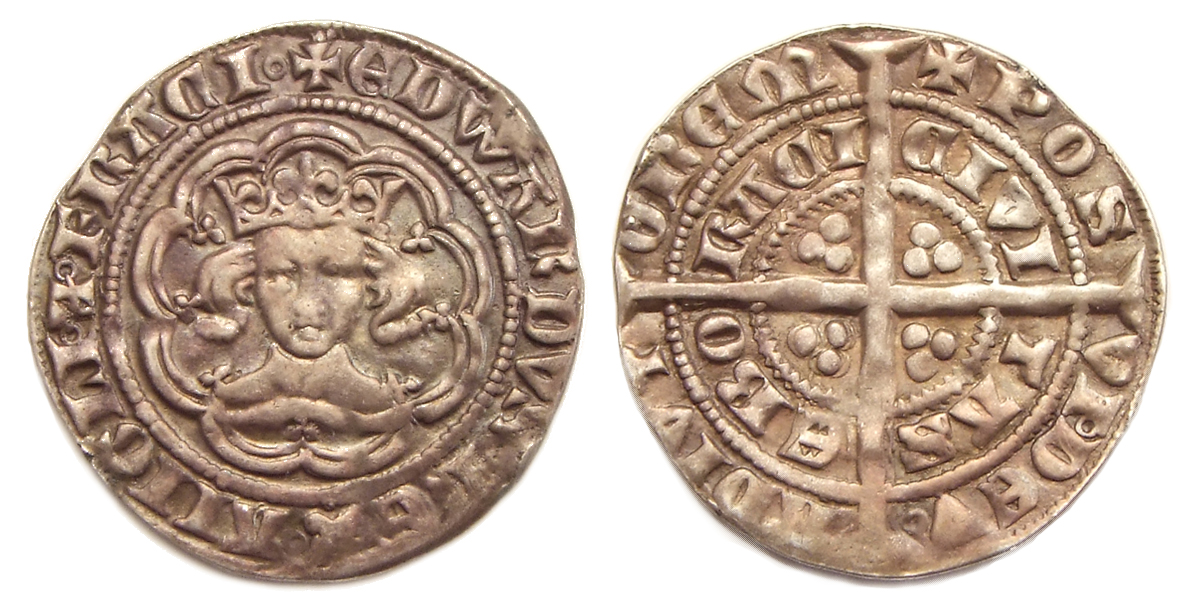
English half groat featuring Edward III on the pile

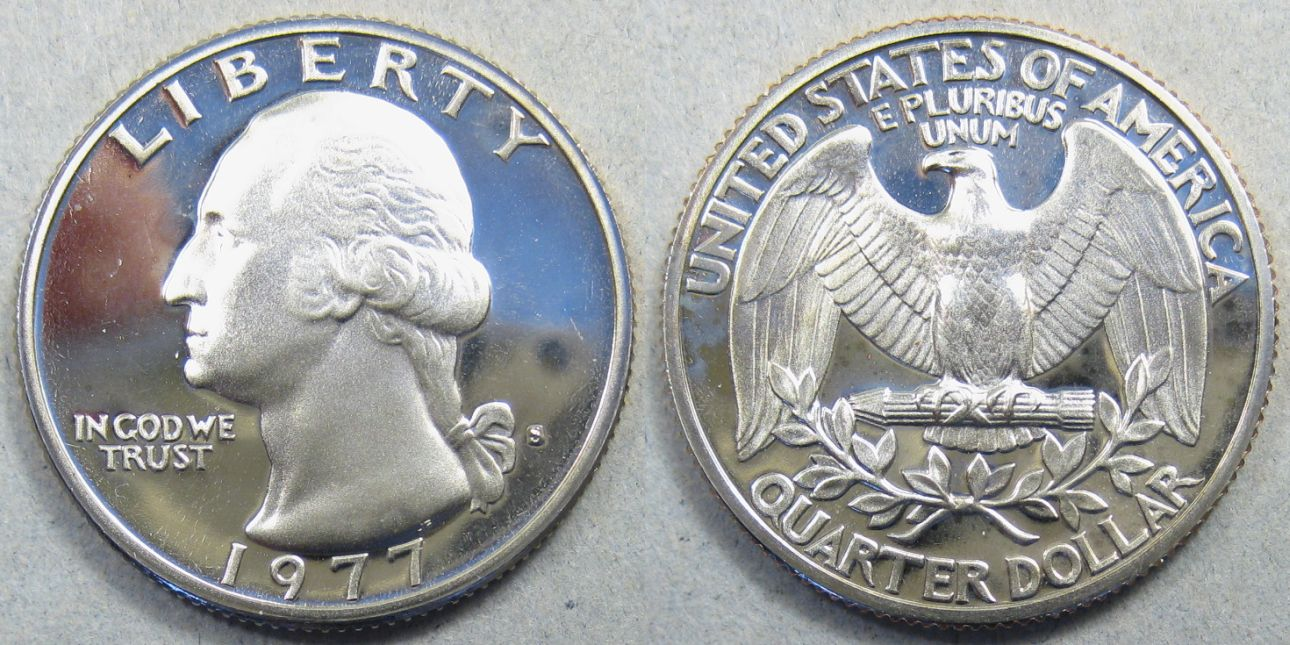
U. S. Washington quarter which, as it happens, includes a tail on its tail

For centuries, coin tosses have served both as complete games, and as preliminaries to actions in other games: as early as the 1660s Francis Willughby notes Cross & Pile being played by children as an independent game, but also cases in which Cross & Pile is used to determine who takes a turn first in other games.

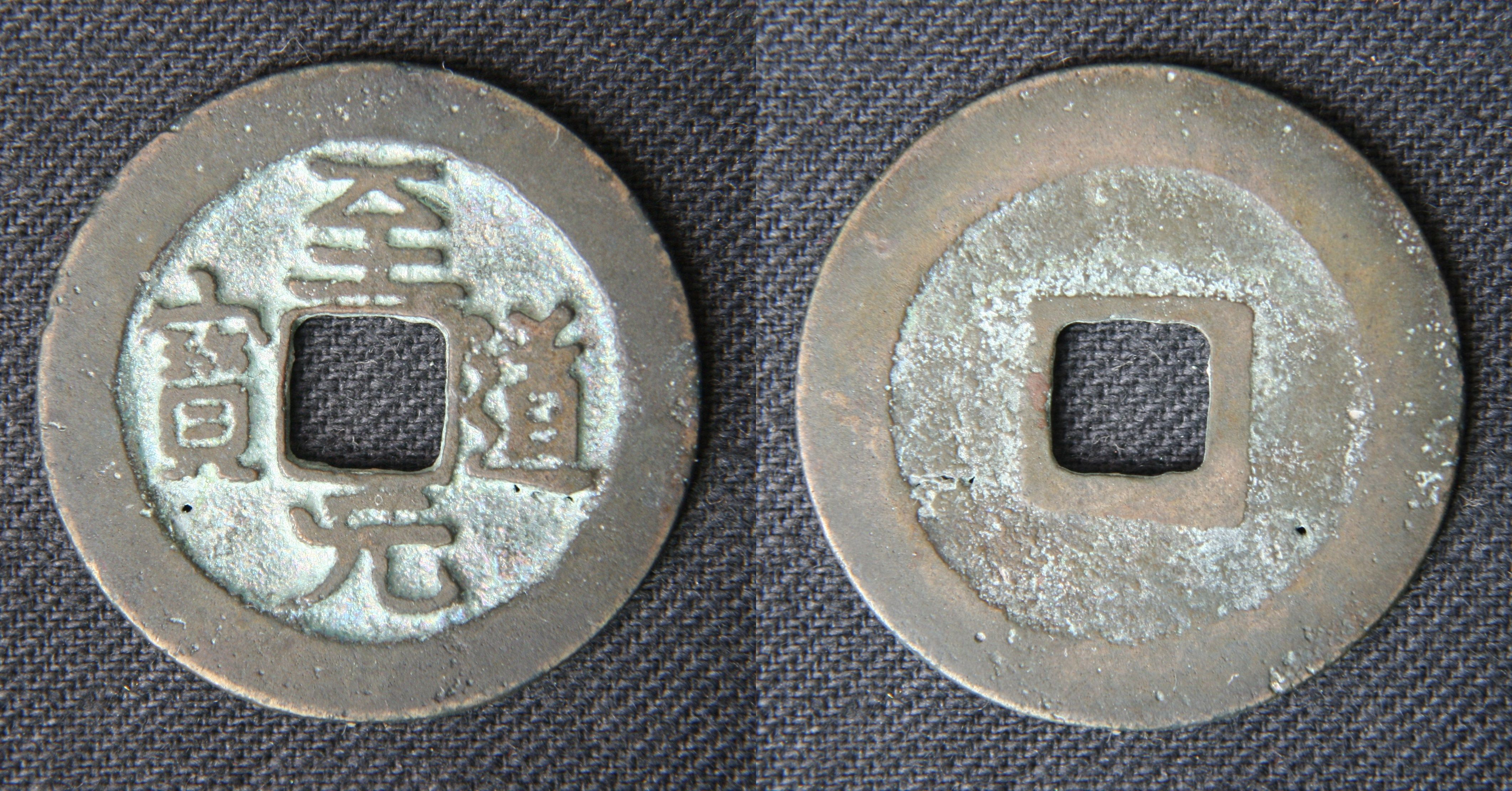
Chinese coin of the Song dynasty, showing marked obverse and unmarked reverse

Coins are commonly used in I Ching divination (although the tallying of Achillea alpina (yarrow) stalks is the older method). The usual method involves casting three coins six times to generate the six lines of a hexagram. Historically, Chinese coins had only one marked side (stamped with writing), and in this procedure it is regarded as yin and given a numerical value of 2, while the unmarked reverse is yang and given a value of 3. The sum of the values of the three cast coins will be between 6 and 9; an even sum means the line is yin, while odd means yang, with equal probabilities. The cast simultaneously gives a second binary result with unequal probabilities: The sums 7 and 8 mean the line is "young", where as the less likely sums 6 and 9 mean the line is "old" and about to change into its opposite.

The oracular text Ling Ch'i Ching is consulted using 12 wooden disks, strictly, Chinese Chess pieces made from a lightning-struck tree; unsurprisingly, other congruent objects such as home-made disks, wooden checkers, and coins are normally substituted. The 12 disks comprise four each of three types (say, four quarters, four nickels, and four pennies), so that a single cast is equivalent to three differentiated casts of four undifferentiated lots, yielding one of 125 possible outcomes (=(4+1)^{3}).

== Staves ==
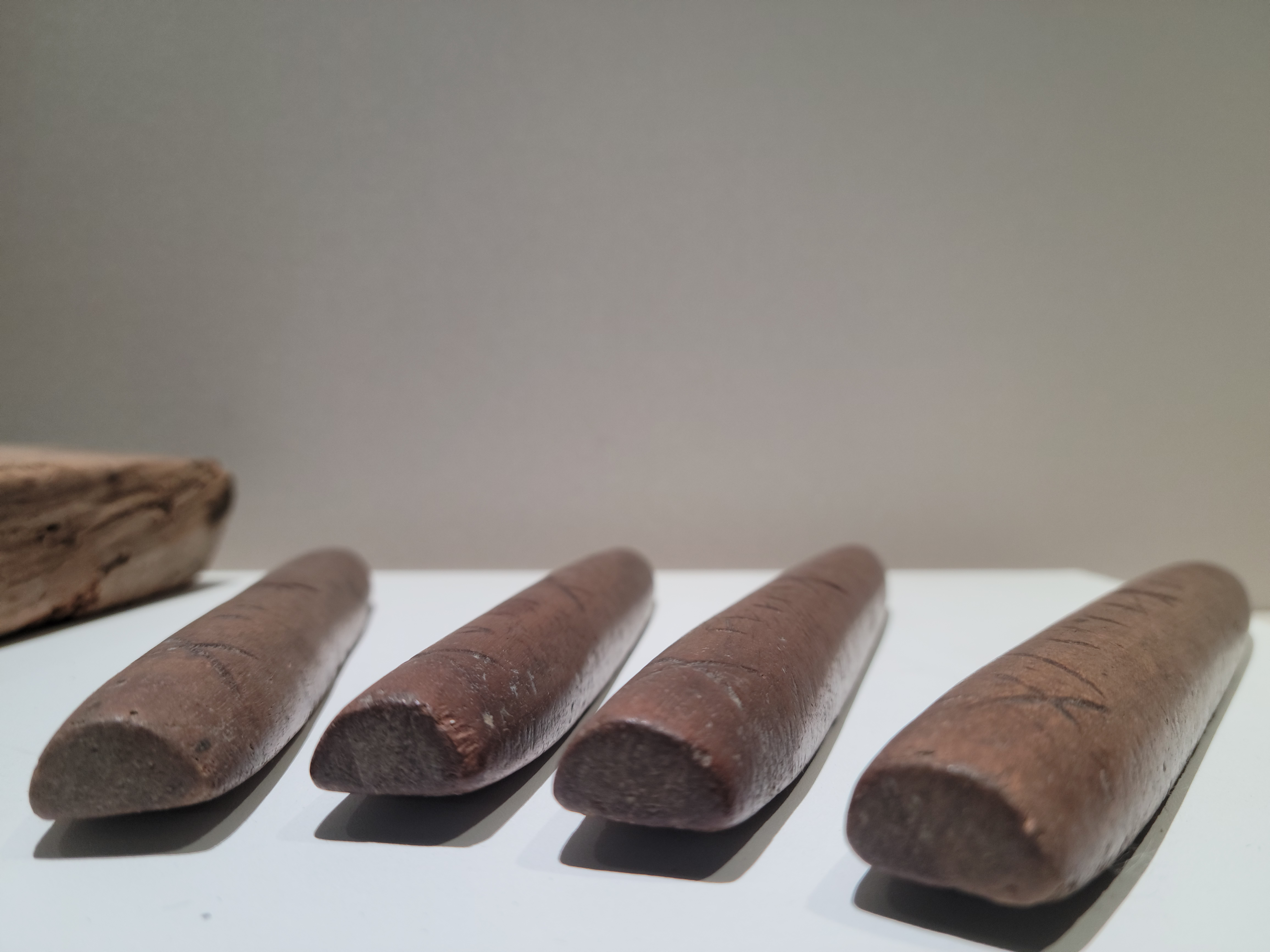
Staves for Yunnori

Staves, (Note: Staves are also referred to as rods or throwing rods, and stick dice. The term stick dice is ambiguous, as it also may refer to long dice.) lengths of wood (also cane, bone, or other materials) typically semicircular in section, are found in many regions and time periods, being used as randomizers (for example) in many Native American board games (of which the Kiowa game Zohn Ahl is often used as an exemplar), in the ancient Egyptian Senet as well as the modern Egyptian Tâb, in the ancient Chinese Liubo, and the ancient — and still current — Korean Yunnori. They are easy to make, usually being formed simply by splitting a stick in half lengthwise, though additional finishing or decoration is often applied.

The majority of games documented use three or four staves, though H. J. R. Murray notes games requiring as many as eight. Liubo in fact means 'six rods', which is the number of staves employed in the game (though 18-faced dice were sometimes substituted).

== Cowries ==
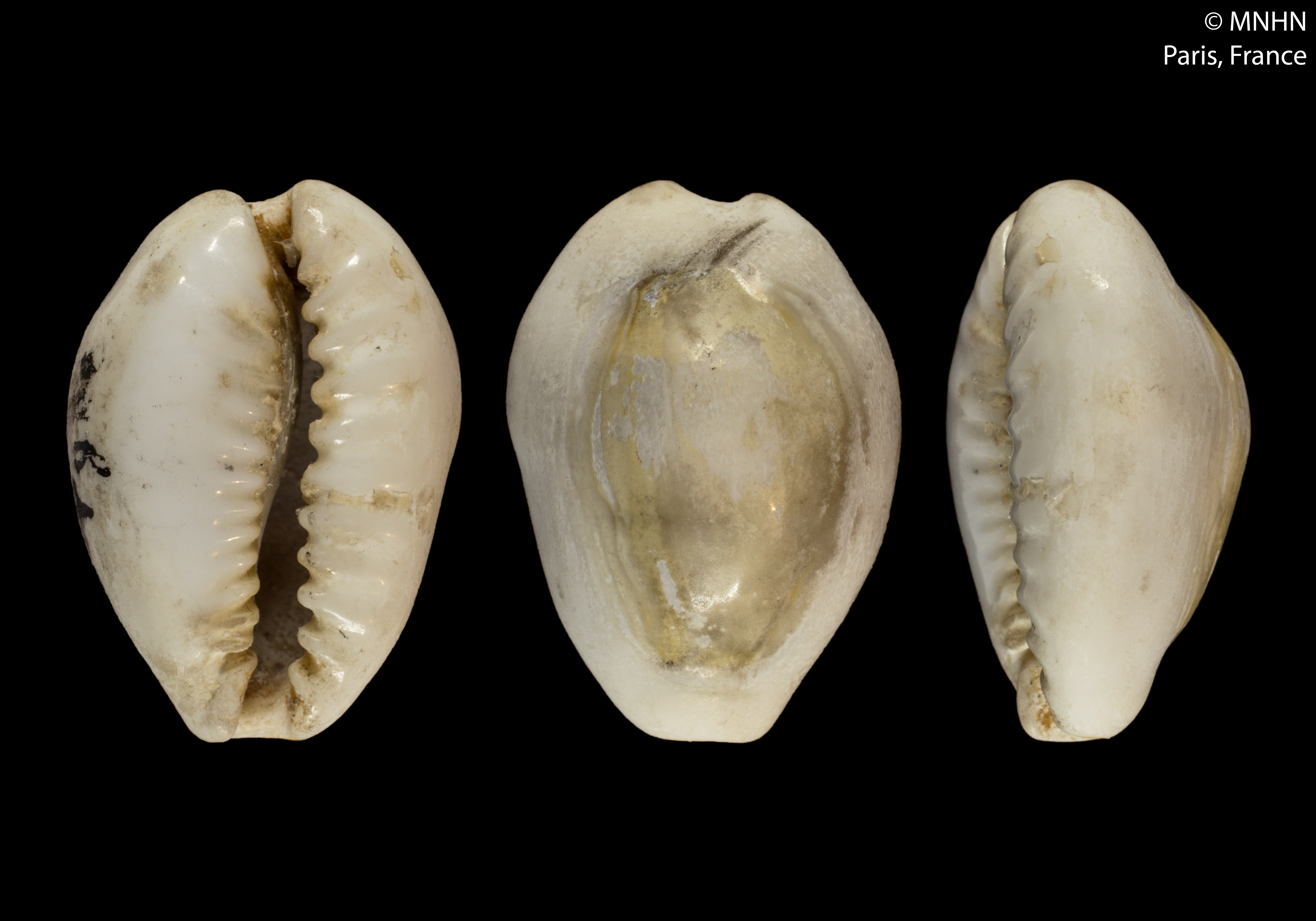
Money cowries: mouth up, mouth down, and side view

The shells of cowries, sea snails of the family Cypraeidae, often function as lots. Their durable shell is rounded on one side. The other (flat) side features a long narrow aperture (commonly called the mouth) running from end to end, which the animal may emerge from and withdraw into.

Various species of cowrie are used as dice for a variety of board games in India, perhaps most prominently in the traditional Indian game of Pachisi. Here, either six or seven cowries are cast simultaneously, resulting in a single move value, depending upon the number landing mouth up.

In owo mȩrindinlogun, a form of Yoruba divination, 16 cowries are cast, yielding one of 17 possible outcomes, each of which is "associated with memorized verses which contain myths and folktales that aid in their interpretation".

== Other binary lots ==
Any object that may be cast to land distinctly on one of two sides may function as a binary lot.

=== North American ===
In Games of the North American Indians, Stewart Culin provides descriptions and engravings of over 200 sets of binary lots. The majority are half-round staves, but other lots are fashioned from bone, stone, nut shell, fruit stone, corn kernel, mollusk shell, woodchuck and beaver tooth, claw, brass, and china, as well as wooden lots worked to shapes other than the typical half-round stave.

A selection of Native American binary lots documented in Games of the North American Indians

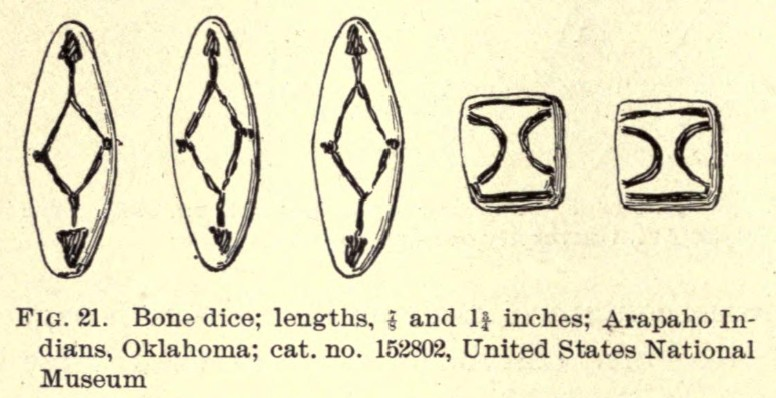
Bone

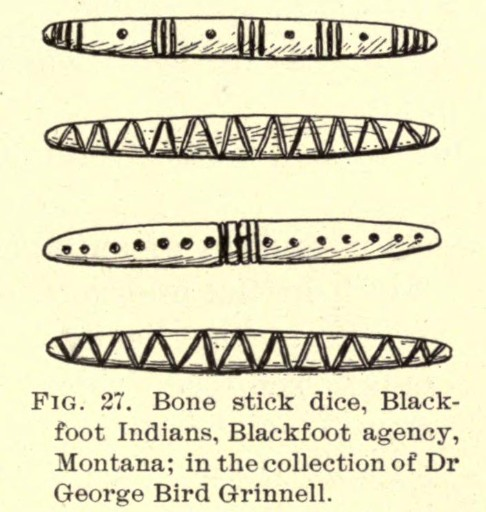
Bone

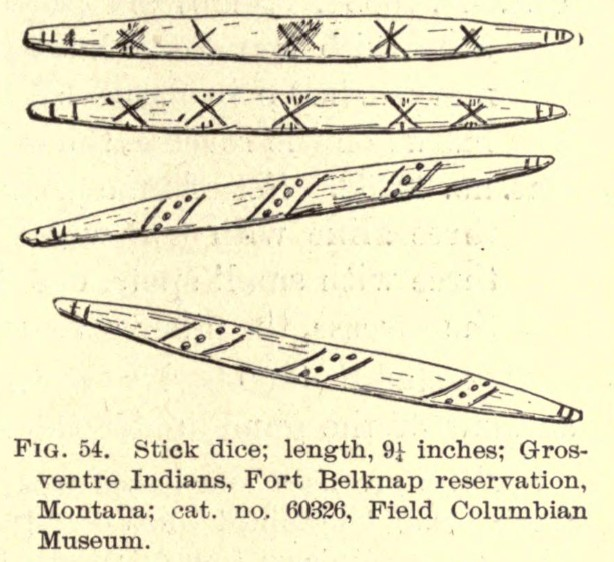
Stick

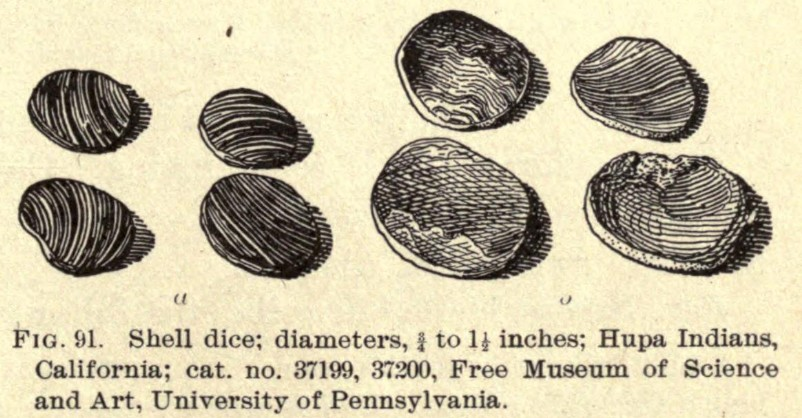
Mollusk shell

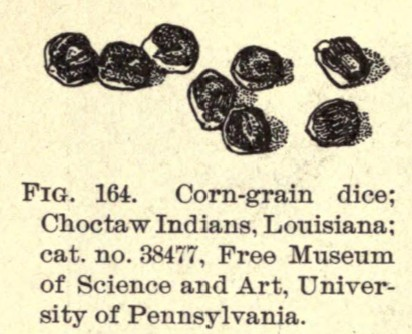
Corn kernel

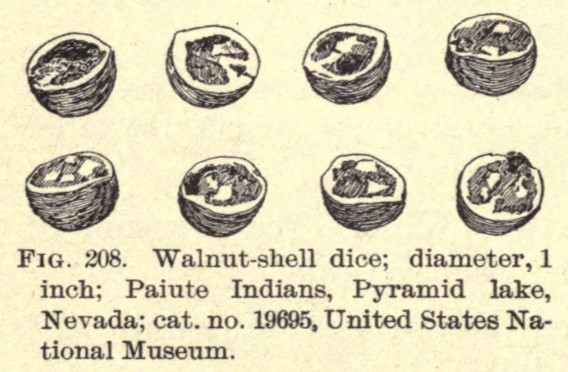
Walnut shell

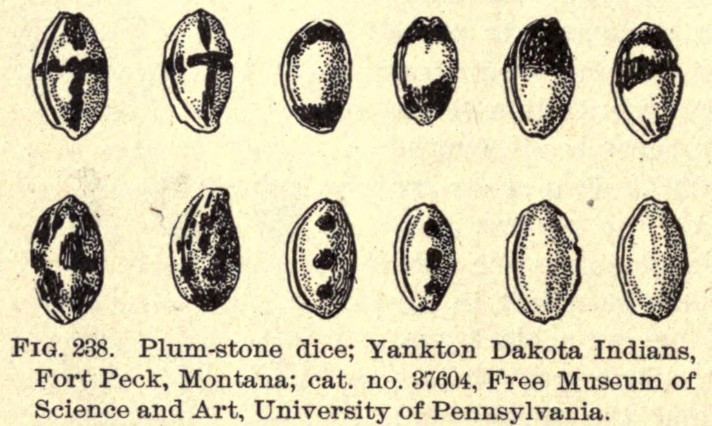
Plum stone

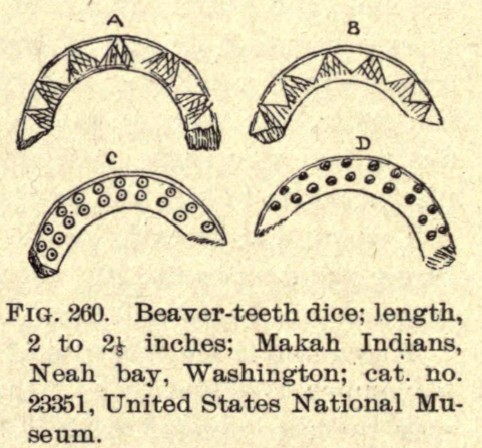
Beaver tooth

=== Urim and Thummim ===
The Biblical Urim and Thummim might have been binary lots, but their form and function remain unclear.

=== Divination tablets ===
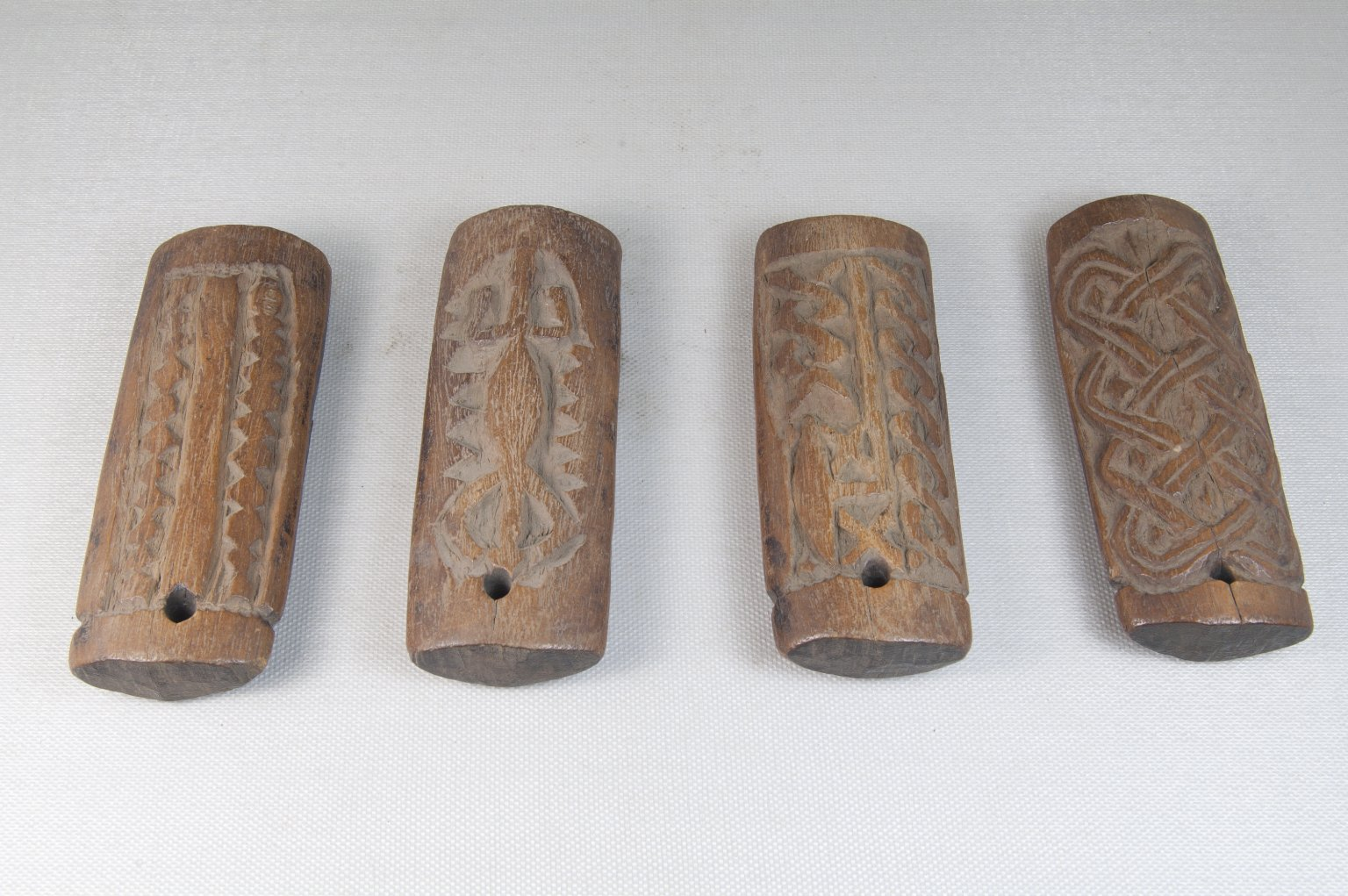
Set of four Hakata divination tablets

Divinatory use of binary lots in the form "four small rectangular or triangular tablets made out of wood, bone or ivory" is widespread in Southern Africa, likely originating with the Shona people some time before 1561. These are flat, or slightly lenticular in section. They are cast multiply, but unlike many sets of binary lots, they are each individually marked; thus these four tablets yield 16 possible outcomes, not five (as would, for example, four undifferentiated cowries).

=== Divination chains ===
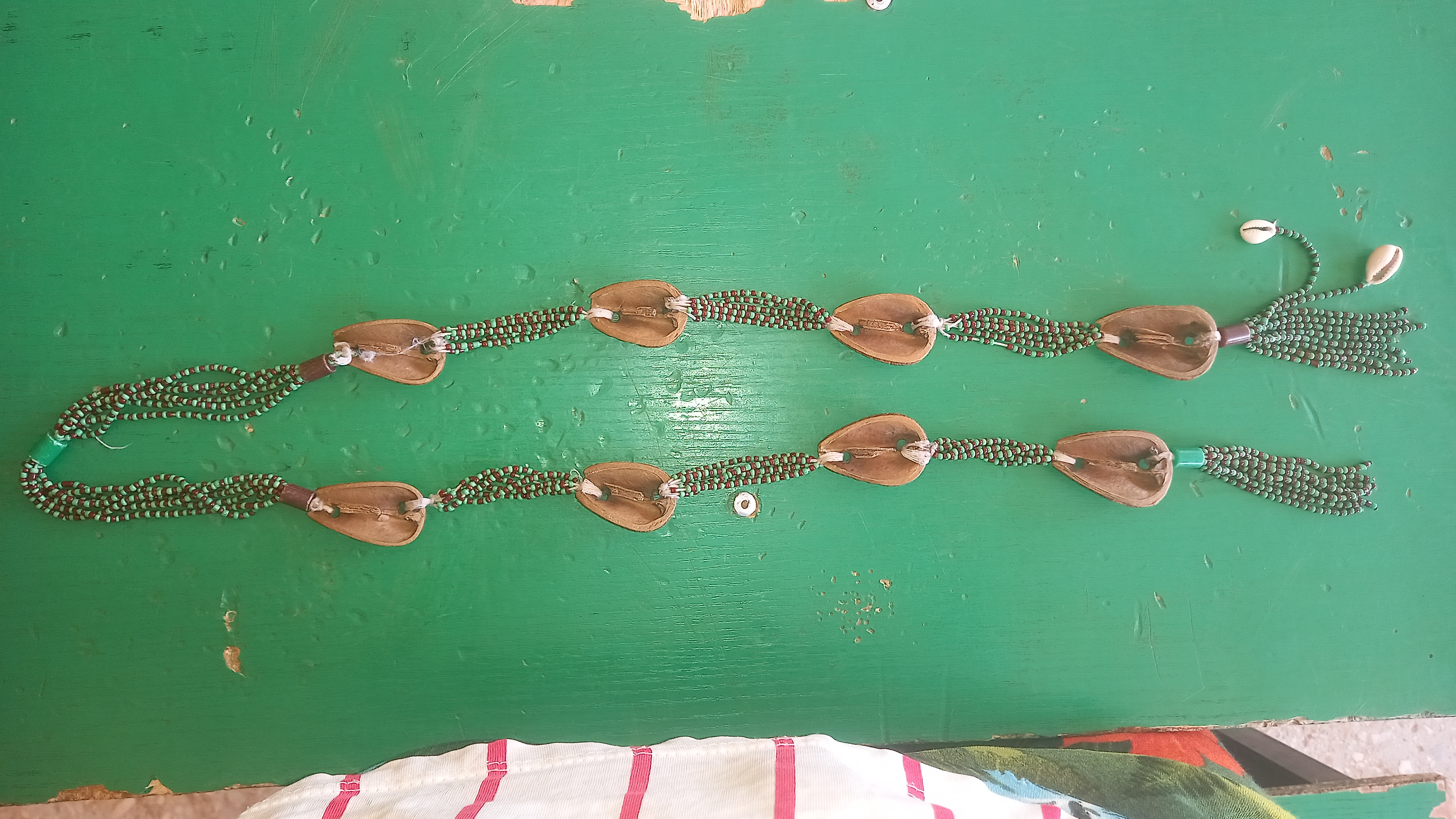
Opele (divining chain)

Several West African divinatory traditions use divining chains featuring multiples of four ordered binary lots (often 8 or 16), in the form of half seed pods or half mango seeds, but also pieces of calabash, metal, or other objects. The most prominent is the Ifa divination of the Yoruba people, using an Opele (divining chain) featuring eight lots, most commonly the pear-shaped half seed pods of Schrebera trichoclada (locally called Opele, whence the chain gets its name). Although the lots are visually similar, they are differentiated by position, being fixed to the chain and the chain being marked with a right and left side; therefore one cast of the chain yields one of 256 (=2^{8}) possible outcomes, each of which is associated with memorized verses.

=== Binary lots with more than two faces ===
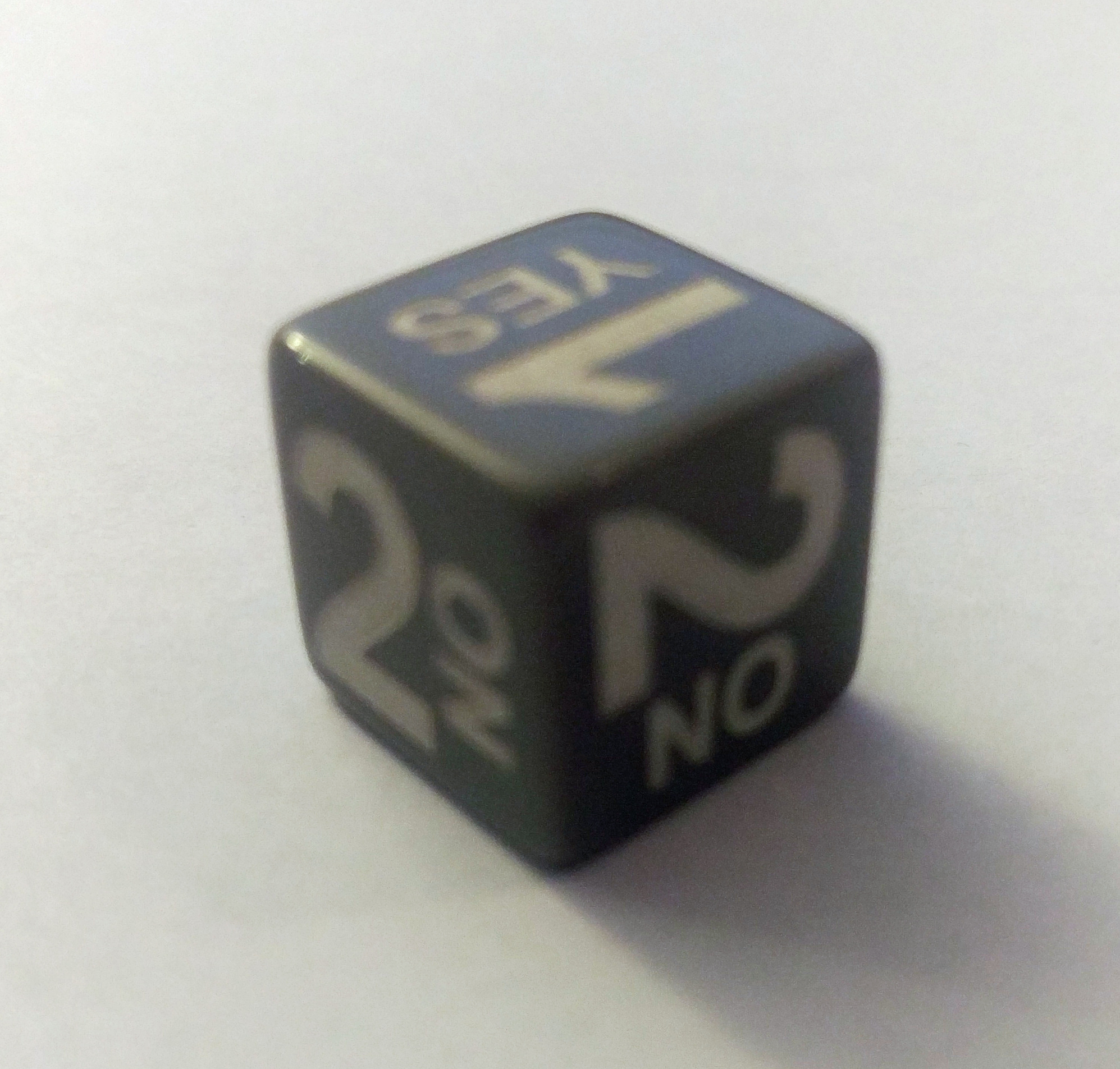
A cubic die yielding only two possible outcomes

Any lot with more than two faces can function as a binary lot if all its faces are grouped into two sets. For example, a cubic die can deliver odds 1:1 like a fair coin if three faces are marked yes and the other three are marked no, or, with a die with normal pip markings, if one only observes whether there is a pip at the center (as on the faces 1, 3 and 5) or not. The dice game Bell and Hammer requires eight cubic dice, each blank on five faces and featuring only a single marked face, each die thus delivering odds 1:5.

Some sets of the Royal Game of Ur, dating from the mid–3rd millennium BCE, include roughly regular tetrahedral (fourfaced) dice with two vertices marked, and two vertices unmarked.

== Outcomes and probability ==
=== Outcomes ===
When a binary lot is cast singly (as is typical with coins) it yields a single binary outcome (yes/no, win/lose, etc.). But more often they are cast multiply, several in a single cast (as is typical with staves and cowries), yielding a range of possible outcomes.

When the lots are undifferentiated, then n lots produce n+1 possible outcomes: thus, casting four staves yields one out of 5 (=4+1) possible outcomes. These outcomes are defined by the number of marked faces uppermost, but the value of these outcomes may differ from the simple count of marked faces. For example, in the modern Egyptian board game Tâb, the following schedule is used:

Marked faces	0	1	2	3	4
Move values	6	1	2	3	4
Extra throw	Yes	Yes	No	No	Yes

This schedule is typical of most board games using multiple-binary casts in that: 1) the move values are based on, but modified from, the simple count of marked faces, and 2) it is the more extreme counts (which are statistically rarer, see below) that are bumped up in value.

When the lots are differentiated, then n lots produce 2^{n} possible outcomes: thus casting four distinct Hakata divination tablets yields one out of 16 (=2^{4}) possible outcomes.

These methods are not always strictly exclusive. Several Native American board games make use of three staves, only 1 of which is differentiated, resulting in six possible outcomes — midway between the four if undifferentiated, and the eight if fully differentiated. The most common coin-based method of I Ching divination begins with a cast of 3 undifferentiated coins (4 possible results), but utilizes 6 casts (differentiated by order) to produce a complete hexagram, representing one of 4096 (=(3+1)^{6}) possible outcomes.

=== Probability ===
==== Even odds ====
Beginning with the assumption that the lot is equally likely to land with either of its faces uppermost, the odds of a single toss are proverbially familiar: 50:50. But as undifferentiated lots are added to a single cast, the odds become uneven. The simplest case is of two lots, marked 0 and 1:

All possible casts
Lot A	Lot B	Outcome
1	1	2
1	0	1
0	1	1
0	0	0

Here, there are four possible casts, but these yield only three outcomes, which have unequal odds, higher for the central outcome(s) and lower for the extreme outcomes: 2 = 25% and 1 = 50% and 0 = 25%. This pattern holds for all casts of undifferentiated binary lots, as shown below:

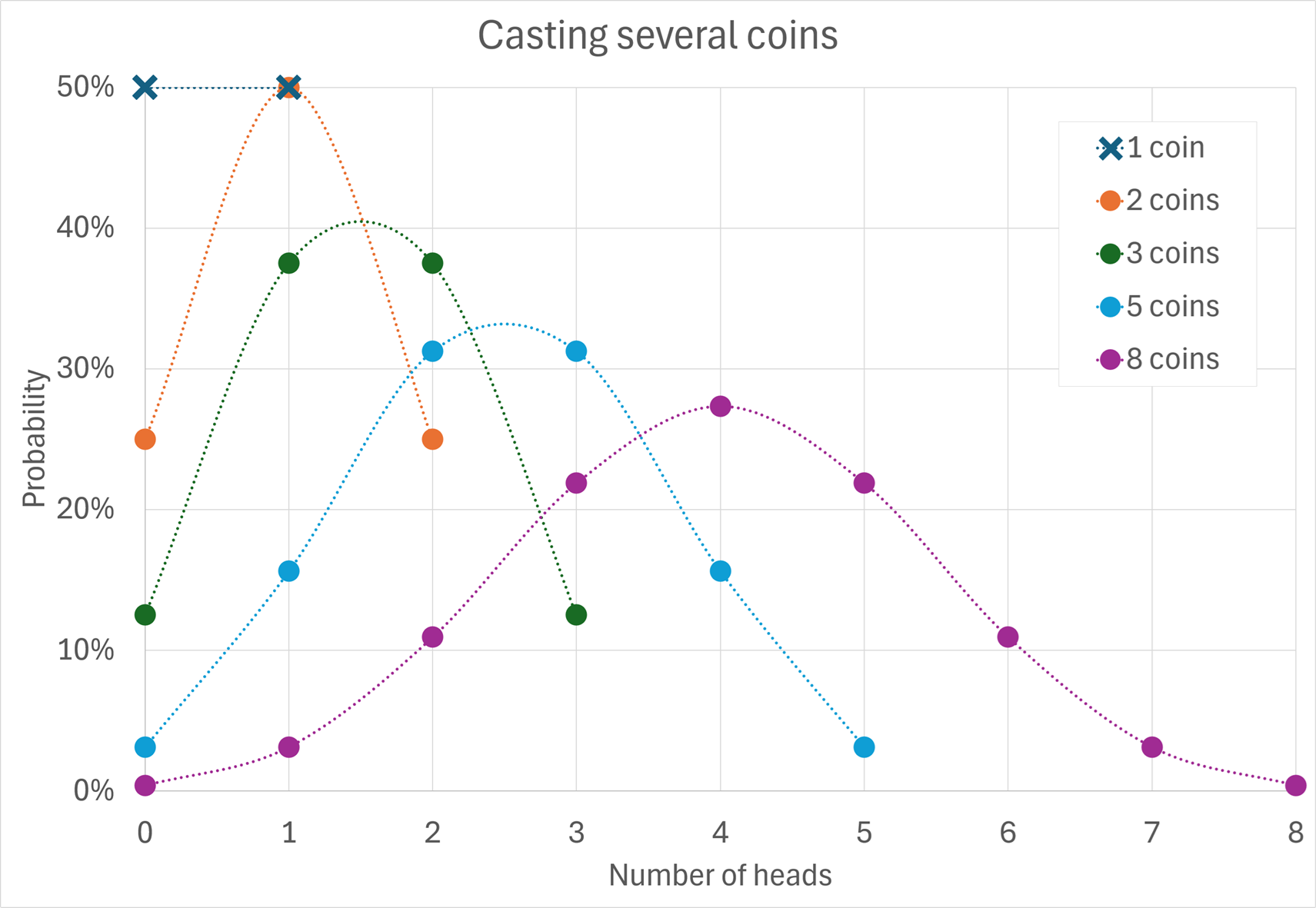

The graphical flattening can be deceptive: using two lots, the central (most common) outcome is twice as likely as the extreme outcome. But using 8 lots, the central (most common) outcome is 70 times more likely than the extreme outcome. Using cubic dice (or any dice with more than 2 faces) flattens this curve somewhat, making the odds more even, as shown below:

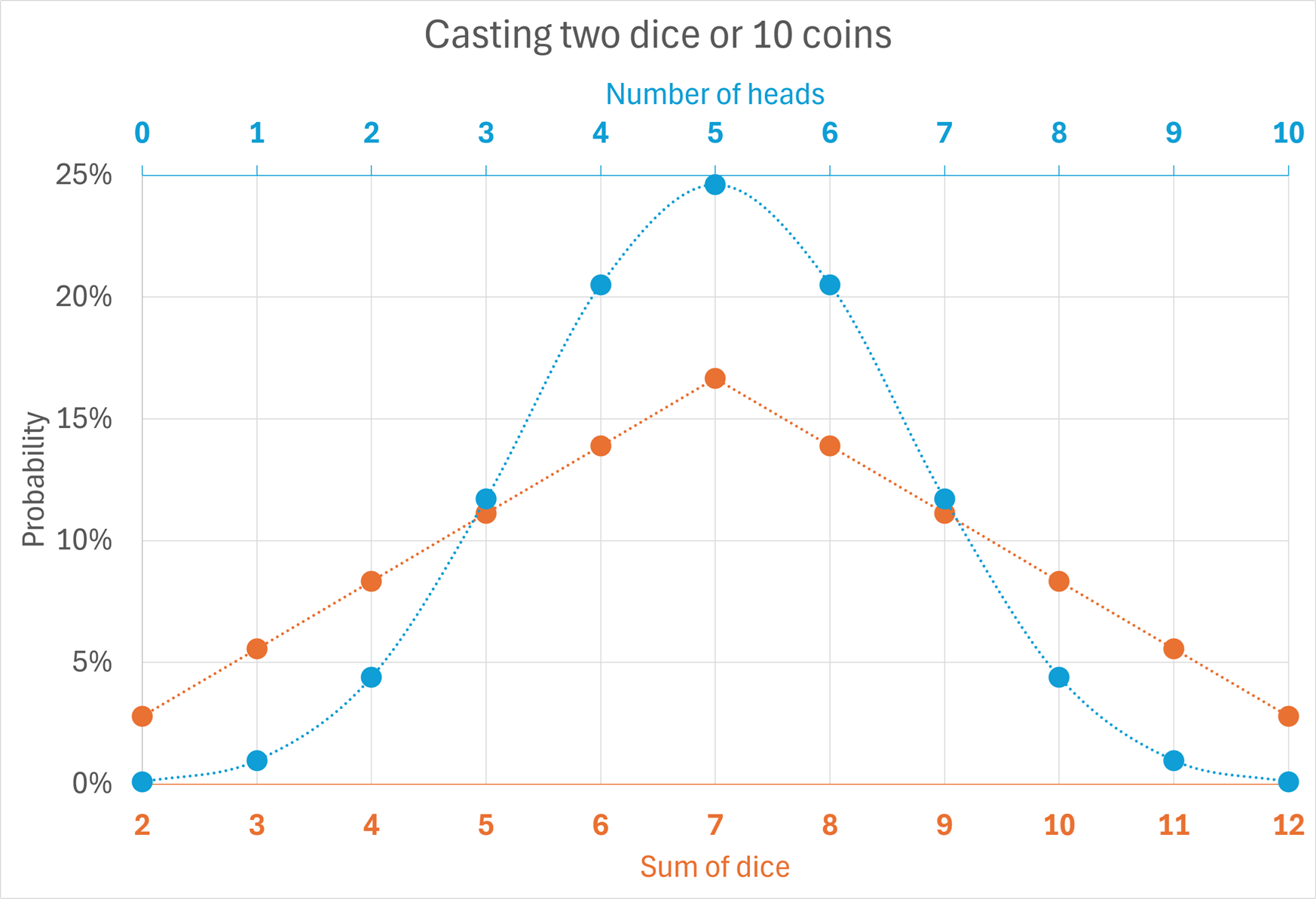
Comparison the 11 outcomes of 2 cubic dice versus the 11 outcomes of 10 binary lots (after Parlett)

David Parlett notes: "Cubes have always tended to oust binaries where both are known, probably because they are more convenient, but perhaps also because they bring the rarer numbers more frequently into play."

==== Uneven odds ====
While one might assume that even a somewhat battered coin will deliver pretty close to 50:50 odds, no such assumption can be made for the large assortment of irregularly shaped binary lots. As an example, take a game of Pachisi in which six undifferentiated cowries are cast.

The odds of "mouth up" for each cowrie may vary by species, individual, and even casting method. During tumbling, a mouth-up cowrie will have an unstable base and high center of gravity, increasing the likelihood of more tumbling; conversely, a mouth-down cowrie will have a stable base and a low center of gravity, increasing the likelihood of coming to rest. The likelihoods of the seven possible outcomes can be compared between hypothetical cases in which the mouth-up probabilities are 1/3 versus 2/5 versus 1/2:

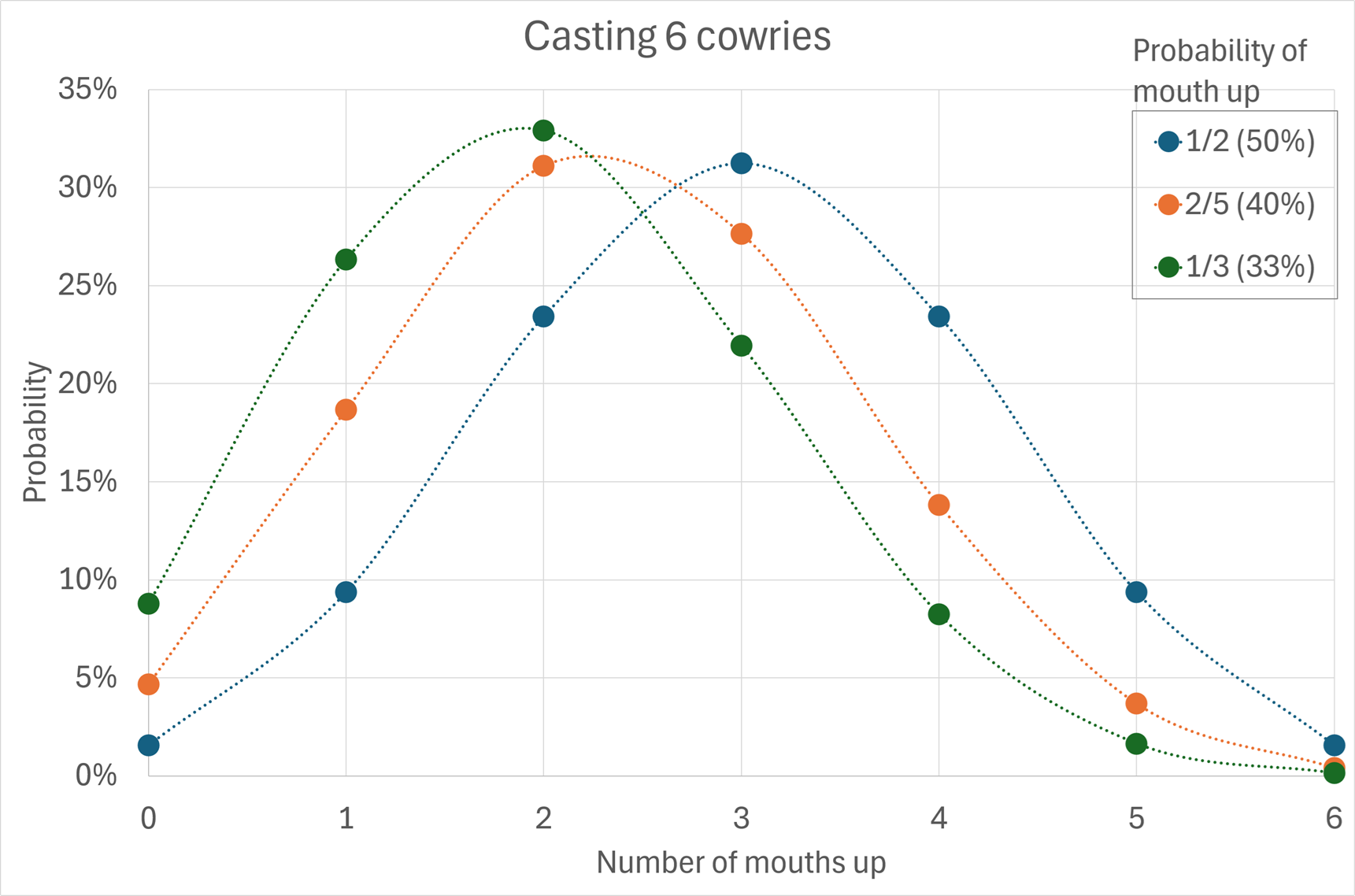

At first glance, it appears that uneven odds will make for an extremely slow game. However, Pachisi, like most games calling for binary lots, rewards the extreme throws more than the central throws, for example in this schedule, which Murray asserts to be the most common:

Mouths up:	0	1	2	3	4	5	6
Values:	6+	10+	2	3	4	25G+	12G+

(G = grace, a useful bonus point; + = roll again.)

If the four extreme outcomes are collectively considered the "good" ones, then uneven odds actually increase the chances of a "good" cast (where the bulk of the gain is from 1 mouth up):

Mouth-up probability	Likelihood of "good" cast
50%	22%
40%	27%
33.3%	37%

== Sources ==
- Bascom, William (1969). Ifa Divination: Communication Between Gods and Men in West Africa. Bloomington: Indiana University Press. ISBN 0-253-20638-3.
- Bell, R. C. (1979). Board and table games from Many Civilizations (Revised ed.). Mineola, NY: Dover. ISBN 0-486-23855-5.
- Culin, Stewart (1898). Chess and Playing-Cards. Washington DC: US National Museum.
- Culin, Stewart (1907). Games of the North American Indians. Washington DC: Government Printing Office.
- Cram, David; Forgeng, Jeffrey L.; Johnston, Dorothy, eds. (2003). Francis Willughby's Book of Games: A Seventeenth-Century Treatise on Sports, Games and Pastimes. Ashgate. ISBN 9781859284605.
- Endrei, Walter; Zolnay, László (1986). Fun and Games in Old Europe. Budapest: Corvina. ISBN 963-13-2386-2.
- Finkel, Irving (2004). "Dice in India and Beyond". In Mackenzie, Colin; Finkel, Irving (eds.). Asian Games: The Art of Contest. Asia Society. pp. 36–45. ISBN 0-87848-099-4.
- Finkel, Irving (2007). "On the Rules for the Royal Game of Ur". In Finkel, Irving (ed.). Ancient Board Games in Perspective. London: British Museum Press. pp. 16–32. ISBN 978-0-7141-1153-7.
- Greenberg, Moshe (2007). "Urim and Thummim". In Skolnik, Fred; Berenbaum, Michael (eds.). Encyclopaedia Judaica. New York: Thomson Gale. pp. 422–423. ISBN 978-0-02-865948-0.
- Kashiwa, Ivan (1997). Spirit Tokens of the Ling Qi Jing. Weatherhill. ISBN 0-8348-0400-X.
- Mackenzie, Colin (2004). "Liubo: The Five-Hundred-Year Craze". In Mackenzie, Colin; Finkel, Irving (eds.). Asian Games: The Art of Contest. Asia Society. pp. 113–125. ISBN 0-87848-099-4.
- Murray, H. J. R. (1951). A History of Board-Games Other Than Chess. Oxford: Oxford University Press. ISBN 978-0-87817-211-5.
- Parlett, David (1999). The Oxford History of Board Games. Oxford University Press. ISBN 0-19-212998-8.
- Rutt, Richard (2002) [1996]. The Book of Changes (Zhouyi) : A Bronze Age Document. Curzon. ISBN 0-7007-1491-X.
- Sawyer, Ralph D.; Sawyer, Mei-chün Lee (1995). Ling Ch'i Ching: A Classic Chinese Oracle. Shambhala. ISBN 1-57062-083-0.
- van Binsbergen, Wim (1996). "Regional and Historical Connections of Four-Tablet Divination in Southern Africa". Journal of Religion in Africa. 26 (1): 2–29. doi:10.2307/1581892. hdl:1887/9101. ISSN 0022-4200. JSTOR 1581892.
