= Daldøs =

Board game

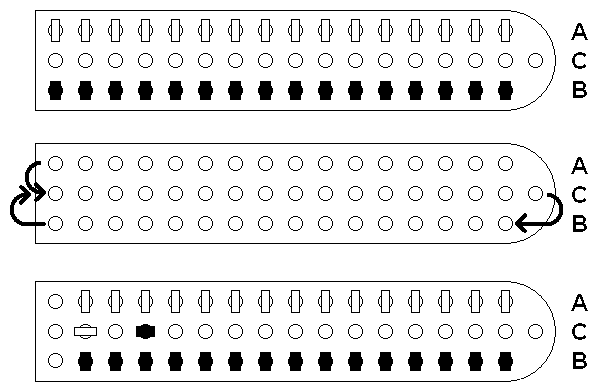
- Daldøs board. Top: Opening position. Middle: Route for player A's pieces. Bottom: Position after first move for each player.
- Years active: First documented in 1800s. Fallen largely out of use by first half of 1900s.
- Genres: Board game Running-fight game Dice game
- Players: 2
- Setup time: 30 seconds - 1 minute
- Playing time: 5–60 minutes
- Chance: Medium (dice rolling)
- Skills: Strategy, tactics, counting, probability
- Synonyms: Daldøsa

Daldøs [dal'døs] is a running-fight board game only known from a few coastal locations in southern Scandinavia, where its history can be traced back to around 1800. The game is notable for its unusual four-sided dice (stick or long dice). In Denmark it is known as daldøs in Northern and Western Jutland (Mors, Thisted and Fanø), and possibly as daldos on Bornholm. In Norway it is known under the name of daldøsa from Jæren, where, unlike in Denmark, a continuous tradition of the daldøs game exists. Daldøs has much in common with some games in the sáhkku family of Sámi board games. Sáhkku is known to have been played among Sámi on the northern coast and eastern-central inland of Sápmi, far away from Jæren and Denmark. Otherwise, the closest relatives of this game appear to be the tâb games from Northern Africa and South-western Asia, possibly apart from one unlabelled diagram in a codex from Southern England.

== Etymology ==
In the name daldøs, the first syllable refers to the throw dal. The marking A on the daldøs dice probably stands for ace or the like, but the etymology of the name dal remains a mystery. One theory connects dal to Medieval English daly, meaning die. Døs is probably a variant of a Nordic word traditionally used for the "two" on a die, related to old French doues, surviving in the Danish word sinkadus, originally meaning a dice throw from another dice game of a 5 and a 2. Most of the tâb games and the Samít sáhkku game are likewise named after the dice throw "one", which is required to release the pieces so that they can start moving; there is no obvious reason why the throw "two" should be included in the name of the game, unless "daldøs" actually means "two dals" (dal-dal).

== History and sources ==
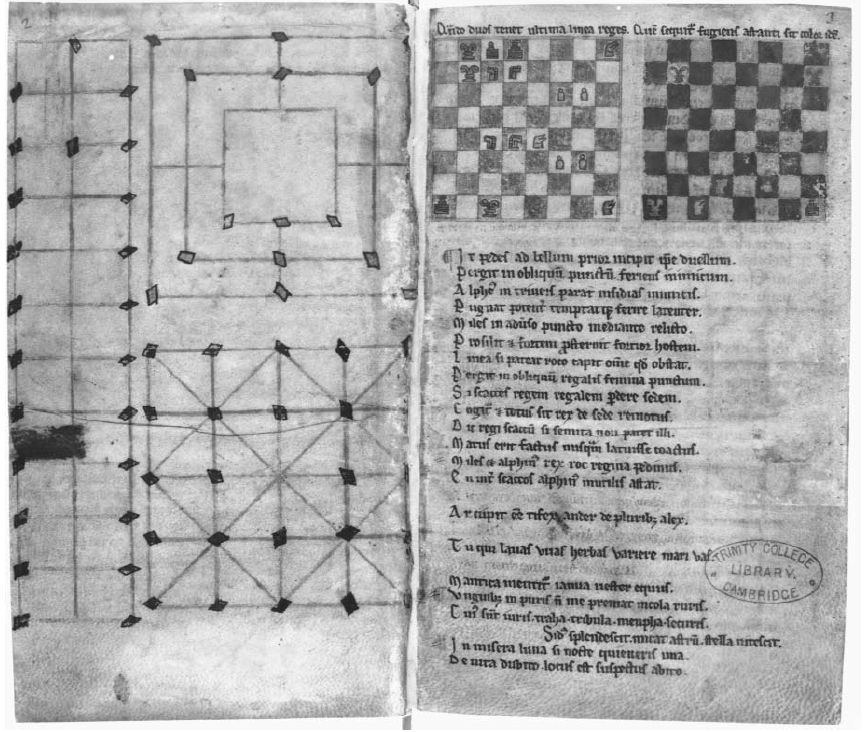
A manuscript from 1250-1300, showing a possible Daldøs board on the far left

The origins of Daldøs are unknown, but it is strikingly similar to some games in the tâb group from Northern Africa and Western Asia, widely distributed during the Muslim expansion. One may conjecture that some sea-going trade contact has carried a tâb game to Scandinavia, either directly from the Arab world, or possibly via England, where a codex from Cerne Abbey, Dorset, from the second half of the thirteenth century (Folio 2v, MS 0.2.45, Trinity College Library, Cambridge) possibly shows a Daldøs board with 11+12+11 holes, after both players have made their first move. The game must have arrived in Scandinavia not much later than 1800, and quite possibly a few centuries before that. A connection involving the Swedish Vikings known as Varangians, mercenaries for the Byzantine Empire before 1100, has been suggested.

In a Danish historical novel "Fru Maria Grubbe" written in 1876 by J. P. Jacobsen, Maria plays daldøs with her husband in 1661. But most likely, Jacobsen knew the game from his childhood in Thisted in the 1850s. In an article from 1927 by H. Billeskov Jansen, the game is described in detail and the rules are given. The author had found one of the few surviving specimens from a farm near Thisted – a farm where Jacobsen used to come as a child. This game is now at Thisted Museum. Another game from Mors is now at Nationalmuseet (Brede), and another at Morslands Historiske Museum (the local historical museum of Mors). From Bornholm, no sources mention the game, but a local saying spilla daldōs (lit. playing daldøs), meaning to live beyond one's means, has been recorded in 1856. A similar meaning has been recorded in Jutland.

In Jæren in Norway, a game of unknown age is kept in the Hå Municipality bygdemuseum, a part of Jærmuseet. Jæren had close trade connections with the Danish regions where daldøs was played.

== Typical materials ==
The board is boat-shaped and has three parallel rows of holes, two of which (A and B) have 16 holes each, while the middle row has an extra hole in the prow of the ship.

Each player has 16 spatula-shaped pieces with a bottom end fitting into the holes of the board. One player has pieces that are rather wide and thin; whereas the other player's pieces are more obelisk-shaped. At the beginning of the game, player A's pieces are placed in the holes of row A so that the spatulas are perpendicular to the row (un-dalled), and equivalently for player B. Later in the game, the pieces will be turned (fordallede, or dalled) so that the spatula is parallel to the rows.

A four-faced Daldøs die, "unrolled" at right to show one of its standard configurations.

Two special dice are used. Each die is a four-sided long die with pyramidal or rounded ends, preventing the die from standing on end. They may be about 2 by 2 cm in cross section, and 4 cm long. The four sides are marked A (with the value 1, called dallen, i.e. the dal), II (2, probably called døs), III (3) and IIII (4). According to some sources, the dal is opposite to III.

== Rules ==
=== Starting the game ===
Both players throw the dice; the highest throw (adding the dice, the dal counting as 1) begins the game.

=== Dalling ===
Pieces cannot move until they have been dalled. A die showing the dal allows the player to dal one piece, which means to turn it parallel to its row and move it one position ahead. With the first dal, only the piece closest to the stern can be dalled, and then it goes into the middle row. With no dalled pieces, a throw with no dals is a lost move.

=== Moves ===
The dalled pieces move according to dice throws. Each player's pieces move first through the home row to the stern, then through the middle row towards the prow, then into the enemy row back towards the stern. From here it moves into the middle row again, etc., never returning to the home row. The showings of the two dice may be either added and used to move one piece, or used separately for two different pieces. E.g., a throw of a dal and a three allows the player (i) to dal one piece (moving it one position) and then move another dalled piece three positions; (ii) to dal one piece and move it a total of four positions; (iii) to move two dalled pieces, one three positions and the other one position; or (iv) to move one dalled piece four positions. The showings of both dice must be used in a move. If that is not possible, the showing of one of the dice must be used. If that is not possible either, the move is lost. At a throw of dal-dal (two dals), the player has an extra throw.

=== Object ===
The object of the game is to remove all enemy pieces from the board. An enemy piece is removed when another piece ends at the same position. When the dice are added, only an enemy piece at the final position can be removed. Enemy pieces (both dalled and not) can be jumped, but are not removed thereby. Friendly pieces cannot be jumped at all. The game ends when one player has no pieces left.

== Variations ==
The shape of the board, the pieces and the dice vary. E.g., the dal marked A in Denmark is marked X in Norway, and I in some modern reconstructions.

In the rules supplied with some reconstructions of the game, the direction of the moves is reversed (prow-to-stern in the middle row instead of stern-to-prow, etc.). However, this difference has no real consequences.

In some reconstructions, the pieces are cylindrical with one end painted black for player A and white for player B. Undalled pieces are turned with the painted end down.

Some sources specify that only a player's undalled piece closest to the stern may be dalled. With this rule, the pieces need not be designed so that one can see whether a piece is dalled or not; instead the next piece to be dalled can be indicated by a marker.

Also, some sources indicate that when the dice are added and used to move one piece, enemy pieces at the intermediate position as well as at the final position are removed.

The end game can be tedious, so it has been suggested to agree that the first player to have only one piece left loses.

The number of holes in each row is rather arbitrary; instead of the 16+17+16 used in the Danish game, 12+13+12 are used in Norway, with 12 pieces for each player. In either case, there is no obvious reason for the extra hole in the middle row, other than to distinguish the two ends of the board, which is necessary to define the direction of play.

== Strategy ==
The game is simple, and one will soon realise that it pays to have dalled pieces waiting in the home row close to the prow, and also in the enemy row behind all enemy pieces. Most dal throws are used to dal pieces rather than to move already dalled pieces.

=== Probabilities ===
It is often useful to have an idea of the probability that a given piece can be removed in the next round. Suppose player A has a piece a_{1}, and player B has a piece b_{1} a few positions behind a_{1} with no other pieces in between. If it is B's turn, B's chances of being able to remove a_{1} using b_{1} in this turn depends on how many positions b_{1} is behind a_{1}:

Relative positions of pieces. Here, distance b_{1}→a_{1} is 2 and b_{2}→a_{1} is 4.

| Distance b_{1}→a_{1} | 1 | 2 | 3 | 4 | 5 | 6 | 7 | 8 | 9 or more |
| Probability | 44% | 50% | 60% | 67% | 29% | 23% | 14% | 8% | less than 1% |
| Use of dal-dal | 1 | 2 | 0 | 0 | 1 | 2 | 2 | 2 | 2 |

Note that the largest probability, two thirds, is found when b_{1} is four positions behind a_{1}, and note the rapid decrease in the probabilities for larger distances. These values assume that B has sufficient possibilities to use part of the throw elsewhere on the board. E.g., with a distance of 2, B must either throw a dal-dal (probability 1/16), or one die must show 2 (probability 7/16), while B is able to use the other die to move another piece elsewhere on the board. The table row Use of dal-dal indicates how many positions B should move b_{1} at a throw of dal-dal in order to maximize the probability of removing a_{1}, including the extra throw.

If B has an additional piece b_{2} behind b_{1}, but no more than four positions behind a_{1}, the first few probabilities are increased by including the possibility of jumping over a_{1} with b_{1} and then removing a_{1} using b_{2}:

| Distance b_{1}→a_{1} | 1 | 2 | 3 |
| Distance b_{2}→a_{1} | 2, 3 or 4 | 3 or 4 | 4 |
| Probability | 75% | 69% | 67% |
| Use of dal-dal | 1 | 2 | 2 |

Note that now, the largest probability is three quarters, and is found when b_{1} is just one position behind a_{1}.
