= Running-fight game =

Type of board game

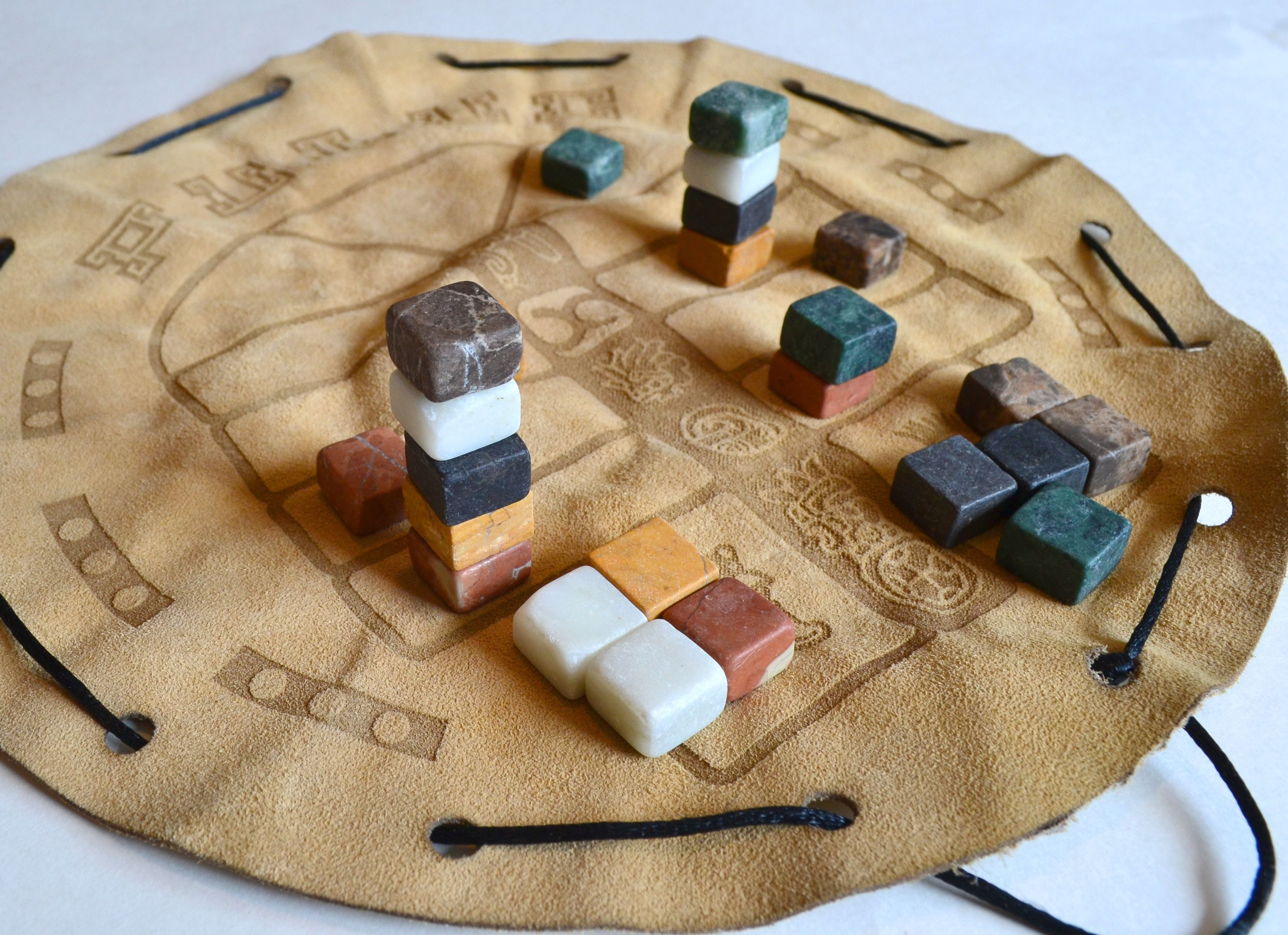
In the running-fight game Bul, pieces are stacked underneath their capturer, when taken

Running-fight games are board games that essentially combine the method of race games (such as backgammon or pachisi) and the goal of elimination-based games such as chess or draughts. Like race games, pieces are moved along linear tracks based on the fall of dice or other lots; but like chess, the object is to capture opponent pieces.

They might be most easily conceptualized as race games with two main differences: First, when a piece lands on a space or point occupied by an opponent, instead of sending it back to the beginning to start over, the opponent piece is captured, permanently removed from the game. Second, there is typically no "end" to the track; pieces keep moving around their circuits, gradually capturing more and more enemy pieces. A player wins and ends the game by capturing the last of the opponent pieces.

Running-fight games are found almost exclusively in Islamic-influenced cultures, ranging from West Africa to India, often bearing the names Tâb, Sig, or variations thereof; in fact, the whole running-fight family is sometimes referred to as Tâb games. However, three European examples exist: Daldøs/Daldøsa (Danish/Norwegian), Sáhkku (Samit), and Að elta stelpur (Icelandic). Also in this group is the pre-Columbian Mesoamerican game known variously as Bul, Boolik, or Puluc.

The modern cross and circle game Fang den Hut! and its descendants Coppit and Headache are also running-fight games. Their unusual method of capture is the same as that of Bul, and conceivably they are descended from it, since a description of Puluc was published in German in 1906, and Boolik in English in 1907; Fang den Hut! was published in Germany in 1927.
