= Senet =

Ancient Egyptian board game

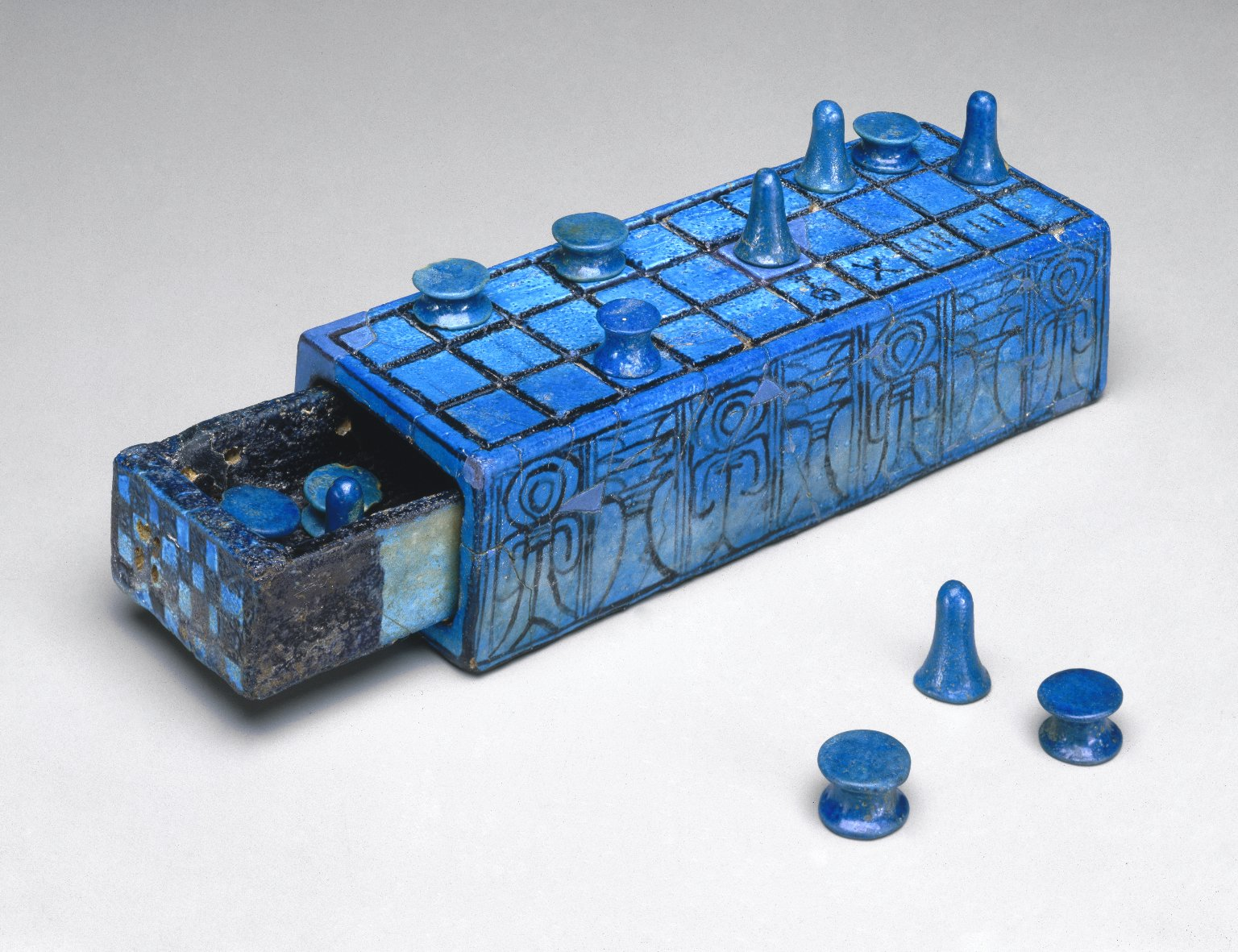
- Senet set inscribed with the Horus name of Amenhotep III (r. 1391–1353 BCE)
- Genres: Board game
- Players: 2

Senet or senat (Ancient Egyptian: 𓊃𓈖𓏏𓏠, romanized: znt, lit. 'passing'; cf. Coptic ⲥⲓⲛⲉ /sinə/, 'passing, afternoon') is a board game from ancient Egypt that consists of ten or more pawns on a 30-square playing board. The earliest representation of senet is dated to c. 2620 BCE from the Mastaba of Hesy-Re, while similar boards and hieroglyphic signs are found even earlier, including in the Levant in the Early Bronze Age II period. Even though the game has a 2,000-year history in Egypt, there appears to be very little variation in terms of key components. This can be determined by studying the various senet boards that have been found by archaeologists, as well as depictions of senet being played throughout Egyptian history on places like tomb walls and papyrus scrolls. However, the game fell out of use during the Roman period, and its original rules are the subject of conjecture.

== History ==
Senet in hieroglyphs
O34 N35 X1 Y5
znt ("passing")
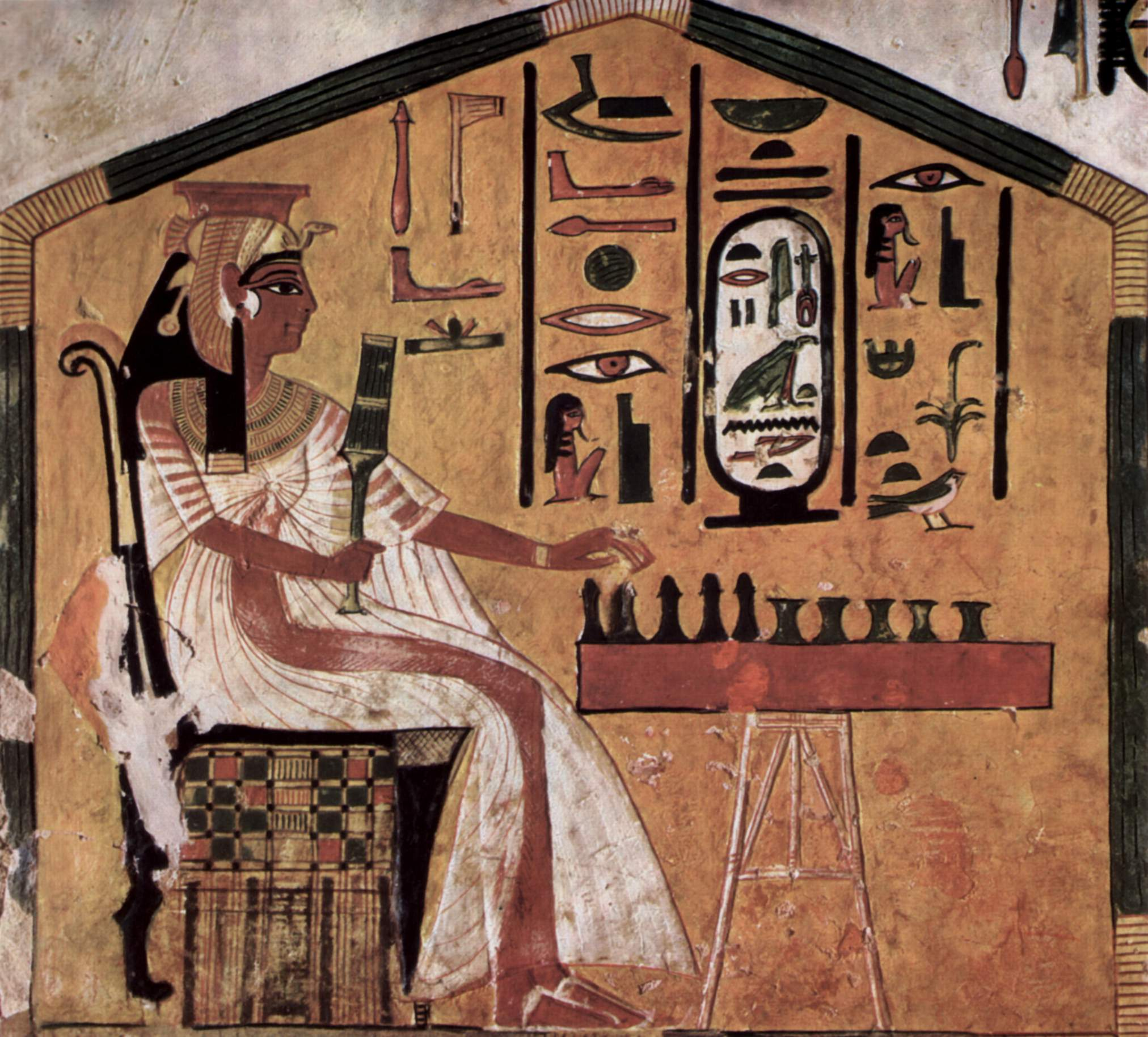
- Painting in tomb of Egyptian queen Nefertari (1295–1255 BCE) playing senet

Fragmentary boards that could be senet have been found in First Dynasty burials in Egypt, c. 3100 BCE. The first unequivocal painting of this ancient game is from the Third Dynasty tomb of the high official Hesy. People are depicted playing senet in a painting in the tomb of the Fifth Dynasty vizier Rashepses as well as from other tombs of the Fifth and Sixth Dynasties (c. 2500 BCE). There is a depiction of Nefertari (wife of Ramesses II) playing senet in tomb art as well during the New Kingdom. Tutankhamun's tomb also contained the game.

Senet is depicted in ancient texts, including in Chapter 17 of the Book of the Dead, where the individual who has died plays the game against an invisible opponent. The game of senet is also depicted in a scene depicted on papyrus dating from roughly 1250–1150 BCE that shows a lion and a gazelle playing senet (in the possession of the British Museum).

A game that could be senet is also referenced in the Roman-era Egyptian literary work that has been given the title in modern times of Setne Khamwas and Si-Osire. In this story, Naneferkaptah challenges Setne to a board game, with the winner taking a book he had been looking for as a prize. The game in this story is not explicitly stated; however, similarities such as the religious implications and structure of the game support the idea that it could be senet being depicted.

The oldest intact senet boards date to the Middle Kingdom, but graffiti on Fifth and Sixth Dynasty monuments could date as early as the Old Kingdom. However, there have been no actual senet boards that have been dated to the Fourth through Sixth Dynasties, just evidence that they did exist from depictions in tombs. In a painting from the Third Dynasty tomb of Hesy-Re, a senet game is depicted along with other boardgames from this era.

A study on a senet board in the Rosicrucian Egyptian Museum, dating back to the early New Kingdom of Egypt, showed the evolution of the game from its secular origins into a more religious artefact. However, the archaeological context of this senet board in question is unknown—it was acquired by the Rosicrucian Museum in London in 1947, and due to poor archaeological practices of the time, the provenance at this point appears to not have been recorded.

Some historians believe that senet could have originated in the Levant before Egypt; however, due to Egypt's involvement in the Levant, Egyptian influence could have introduced the game. Senet was also adopted in Cyprus around the end of the third millennium BCE and continued until at least the Bronze Age.

Though some historians argue that senet essentially disappeared after the Romans, there are some examples of senet graffiti on the roof of the Roman Temple of Dendera, which dates to the Roman period, and which would be the most concrete evidence that the game was played or did exist to some extent during the Roman period.

Senet was rediscovered and reintroduced to the world by Egyptologists during archaeological excavations in Egypt in the 1930s. As no complete record of the game's rules survived, the Swiss archaeologist Gustave Jéquier analyzed recovered senet boards and artistic depictions of senet to devise a conjectural set of rules for the game, which precipitated the initial revival of senet in the modern era. The Jéquier rules were eventually replaced by alternative sets of rules that were reconstructed in the latter half of the 20th century by the Canadian historian R. C. Bell and the American archaeologist Timothy Kendall. Various other Egyptologists have proposed additional rule sets over the years, but these have generally been discredited by subsequent archaeological findings.

== Rules ==
=== Equipment ===
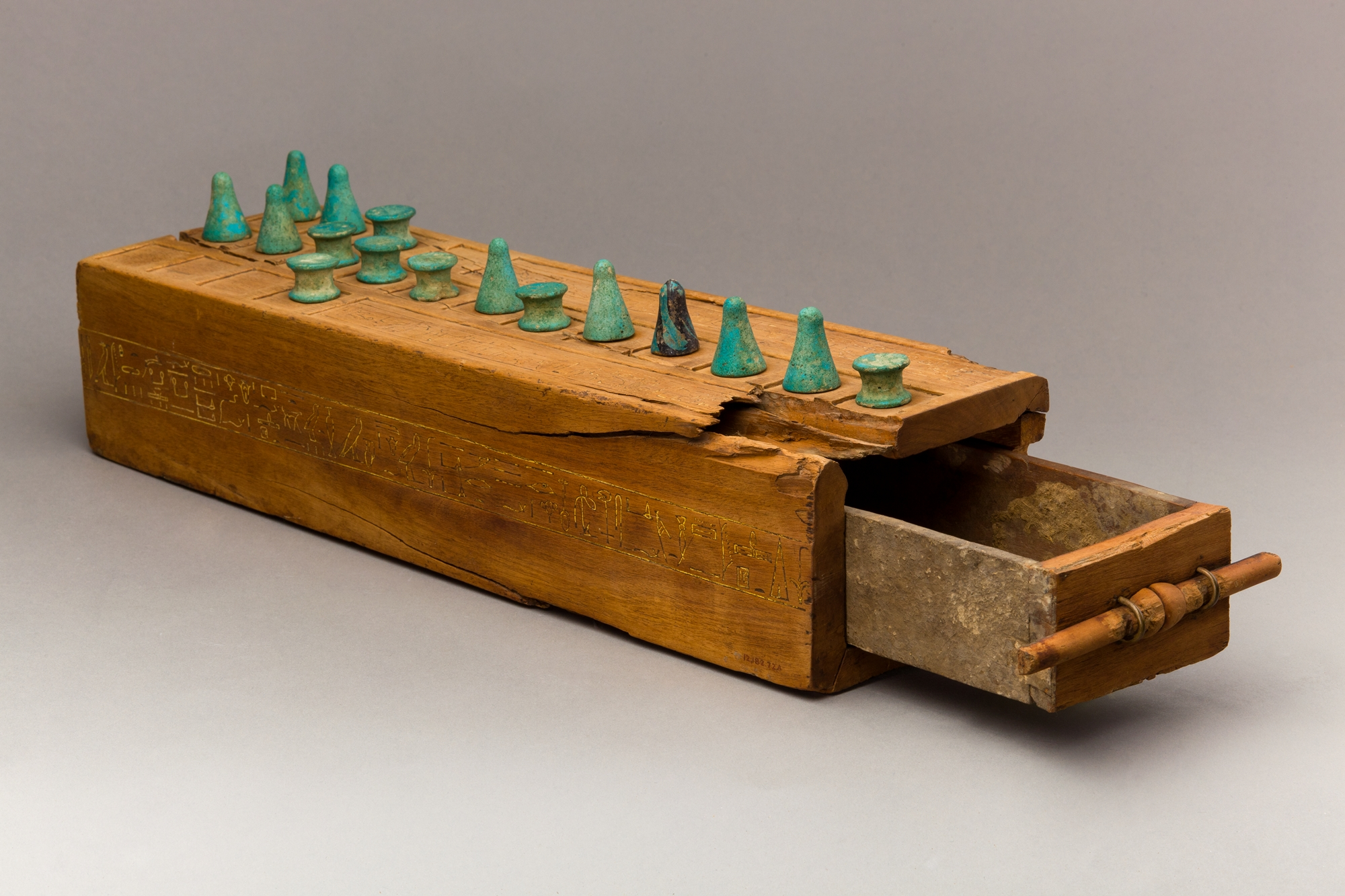
Game box with two games: Game of Twenty on top side of the box and Senet at the bottom, c. 1550–1295 BCE

The senet board itself was usually constructed out of wood, ivory, faience, or some combination of these materials, and the layout of the board was a grid of 30 squares, called "houses", arranged in three rows of ten. A complete senet game set would have contained a distinct set of five pawns for each of the two players. At least by the New Kingdom, these pieces were in the form of hounds or dog-headed figurines. Through most of the game's 2,000-year history, the senet boards themselves would indicate the direction of play, usually from the top left corner and indicated by the decorations on the spaces. The last five squares were often the most decorated on the board. The decorations on the last five squares were unique, usually having a mark related to goodness or an aquatic reference on them.

=== Original rules ===
Due to the game falling out of use during the Roman period, the exact original rules of senet are not known.

At least by the New Kingdom in Egypt (1550–1077 BCE), the game reflected the concept of the ka (vital essence of the soul) passing through the duat (underworld), represented in the game by the spaces connecting the individual to different stages of their lives. This connection is made in the Great Game Text, which appears in a number of papyri, as well as the appearance of markings of religious significance on senet boards themselves.

=== Modern rules ===
Although details of the original game rules are a subject of some conjecture, historians Timothy Kendall and R. C. Bell have made their own reconstructions of the game rules. These rules are based on snippets of texts that span over a thousand years, over which time gameplay is likely to have changed. Therefore, it is unlikely these rules reflect the exact course of ancient Egyptian gameplay. However, their rules have been adopted by sellers of modern senet sets.

==== Kendall ====
In Timothy Kendall's rules, the object of the game is for one player to advance all five of their pawns across the senet board and remove them before the second player does so. The game's length can be extended by increasing the number of pawns allocated to each player as desired, to a maximum of ten pawns per player. The original iteration of Kendall's rules published in 1979 called for seven pawns per player.

Players take turns and begin by throwing a set of four flat wooden sticks with one side painted white and the other side painted black (or differentiated by some other means), equivalent to two-sided dice. The number of sticks that land on white determines how far a single pawn may advance that turn. One white stick and three black sticks signifies that the player may advance one of their pawns forward by 1 house, two white sticks means the pawn can advance by 2 houses, and so on. If all four sticks land on black, then the pawn can advance by 5 houses.

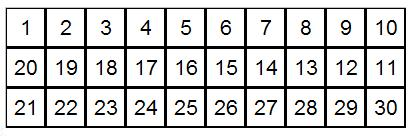
The path of pieces through the 30 squares of the Senet board, as numbered by Peter Piccione

The player selects a pawn and places it on the senet board starting at the first house (numbered 1 in the chart on the right), then moves the pawn forward according to the result of the stick roll. If doing this will result in a pawn coming to rest on a house already occupied by one of their pawns, they must move the newer pawn backward to the first empty house. If the house is occupied by a pawn belonging to the opposing player, then the opponent's pawn can be captured: the player may optionally choose to place their own pawn in the occupied house, then move the opposing player's pawn backward to the first empty house available. Players can move their pawns ahead of each other's pawns as necessary with one exception: if a player forms a line of three or more of their pawns on contiguous, sequential houses, then the other player cannot move any of their own pawns past that formation.

The five decorated houses on the senet board plus House 30, the final house, each have special rules that must be followed:

- House 15, "the Ankh": Behaves like a standard, non-decorated house, but is tied to House 27 as described below.
- House 26, "the House of Happiness": Pawns cannot bypass this house under any circumstance, each pawn must land on it at least once before it can be legally taken off the board.
- House 27, "the House of Water": Any pawn that lands on House 27 must be immediately moved to House 15 or to the first empty house preceding House 15.
- House 28, "the House of Three Truths": Any pawn that lands on House 28 cannot be moved to any other house, and capturing is prohibited. The player can remove their pawn from the board on the first turn that they roll exactly 3 white sticks.
- House 29, "the House of Re-Atoum": Any pawn that lands on House 29 cannot be moved to any other house, and capturing is prohibited. The player can remove their pawn from the board on the first turn that they roll exactly 2 white sticks.
- House 30, "the House of Horus": Any pawn that lands on House 30 can still be captured. The player can remove their pawn from the board on the first turn that they roll exactly 1 white stick, or if the first row of the senet board (Houses 1 through 10) is not occupied by any pawns.

==== Bell ====
R.C. Bell's rules, also first published in 1979, are mostly identical to Kendall's except on the following points. Both players always begin with ten pawns each. All pawns are placed on the board from the start of the game, beginning with a white pawn in House 1, then a black pawn in House 2, and so on until the first two rows of the board are filled. In place of sticks, players take turns rolling a single four-sided die, and turn priority is determined at the start by whoever rolls a higher number. Capturing is mandatory when the opportunity presents itself, but the capturing player confiscates the opposing pawn and removes it from the board, which prevents the opponent from being able to score it. As for the five decorated houses, they have simpler special rules: pawns on those houses cannot be captured, but their owners can take them off the board and score them on the first turn that they roll a specific number. The game ends when the board is emptied, and the winner is whoever scored the most of their own pawns.

== See also ==
- Khaemweset – son of Ramses II, inspiration for the fictional Setne
- Hounds and jackals – ancient Egyptian board game
- Mehen – another ancient Egyptian game
- Royal Game of Ur – a Mesopotamian game played c. 3000 BCE
- Tâb – a Middle Eastern game that is sometimes confused with senet

== Citations ==
- Crist, Walter (2019). "Passing from the Middle to the New Kingdom: A Senet Board in the Rosicrucian Egyptian Museum". The Journal of Egyptian Archaeology. 105 (1): 107–113. doi:10.1177/0307513319896288. ISSN 0307-5133. JSTOR 26949436. S2CID 213815875.
- Crist, Walter (2021). "Debunking the Diffusion of Senet". Board Game Studies Journal. 15: 13–27. doi:10.2478/bgs-2021-0002.
- Crist, Walter; Dunn-Vaturi, Anne-Elizabeth; de Voogt, Alex (2016). Ancient Egyptians at Play: Board games across borders. New York: Bloomsbury. pp. 41–80. ISBN 978-1-4742-2117-7.
- Kendall, Timothy (1978). Passing Through the Netherworld: The meaning and play of Senet, an ancient Egyptian funerary game. Belmont, MA: Kirk Game Company.
- Konstantakos, Ioannis M. (April 2022). "Board Games in Ancient Fiction: Egypt, Iran, Greece". Board Game Studies Journal. 16 (1): 449–490. doi:10.2478/bgs-2022-0016. S2CID 248384865.
- Piccione, Peter A. (2007). "The Egyptian Game of Senet and the Migration of the Soul". In Finkel, Irving (ed.). Ancient Board Games in Perspective. London: British Museum Press. pp. 54–63. ISBN 978-0-7141-1153-7.
