= Stewart Culin =

American ethnographer and author

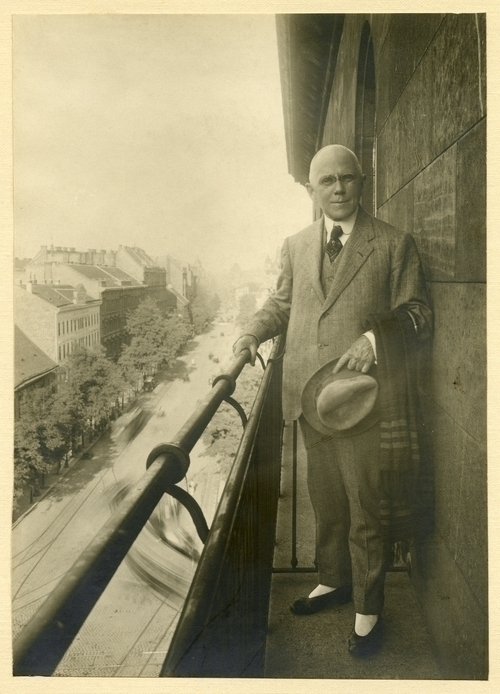
- Stewart Culin, c. 1920
- Born: Robert Stewart Culin; July 13, 1858; Philadelphia, Pennsylvania
- Died: April 8, 1929 (aged 70); Amityville, New York
- Occupation: Ethnographer

Robert Stewart Culin (July 13, 1858 – April 8, 1929) was an American ethnographer and author interested in games, art and dress. Culin played a major role in the development of ethnography, first concentrating his efforts on studying the Asian-Americans workers in Philadelphia. His first published works were "The Practice of Medicine by the Chinese in America" and "China in America: A study in the social life of the Chinese in the eastern cities of the United States", both dated 1887. He believed that similarity in gaming demonstrated similarity and contact among cultures across the world.

== Early life ==
Born Robert Stewart Culin, a son of Mina Barrett Daniel Culin and John Culin, in Philadelphia, Culin was schooled at Nazareth Hall. He entered his father's mercantile business after graduating from high school. While he had no formal education in anthropology, Culin played a role in the development of the field. His interest began with the Asian-American population of Philadelphia, then composed chiefly of Chinese-American laborers.

Early ethnographic approach could predated to 1884, when Culin collected advertisements information in Philadelphia.

His first published works were an 1887 article for a medical journal, "The Practice of Medicine by the Chinese in America" and his speech to the American Association for the Advancement of Science on "China in America : a study in the social life of the Chinese in the eastern cities of the United States". In 1889 Culin published a report about Chinese Dominoes and Dice. In 1890 he wrote an article about Italian marionettes was inspired by a visit to a marionette theater in New York City.

== World of games ==
Active in several ethnographic organizations during the late 1880s, Culin became involved with the World's Columbian Exposition, held in Chicago during 1893. As an assistant curator, Culin organized several game-related exhibitions. In addition, 1891 saw the publication of two papers. The first treated the street games of city boys, the second dealt with Chinese gambling games, providing explanations on Fan-Tan and Pak Kop Pin. At the World Exposition, Culin met Frank Hamilton Cushing. The two became friends and endeavored to create the first cumulative documentation on the world's games.

In 1892 Culin became Director of the University of Pennsylvania's Museum of Archaeology and Paleontology. Married on March 18, 1893, to Helen Bunker, Culin published on the games exhibit at the 1891 Chicago exposition. In 1899 he became curator at the Free Museum of Science and Arts in Philadelphia on American and general ethnology.

Korean Games, with comparisons to those of other Asian cultures, were the topic of Culin's first book, published in 1895. This work was inspired by Cushing, then of the Bureau of American Ethnology of Washington. Culin became interested in chess and card games and published a paper on the topic in 1886. He worked with Cushing on an article called Arrow games and their variants in America and the Orient. When Cushing became ill, Culin continued the work and eventually published three inter-related papers: American Indian Games (1898), Hawaiian Games (1899) and Philippine Games (1900). After Cushing's death in 1900, Culin published a revised version of American Indian Games in 1903.

== Professional life ==
Although he had no formal training, Robert Stewart Culin is known today as an expert on games as well as for his museum work. His influence was not limited to the two great institutions where he spent his career—the University of Pennsylvania and the Brooklyn Museum. Culin was also a founding member of both the American Anthropological Association and the American Folklore Society, and was an experienced collector and exhibitor who organized exhibitions at world's fairs in Madrid (1892) and Chicago (1893). He was elected a member of the American Philosophical Society in 1897. In the same year, he was elected as a lay member of the Salmagundi Club New York.

Culin's collecting methodology in many ways exemplified the attitudes and assumptions of the heyday of anthropological collecting known as the "museum age" (1875–1925). His major focus was to understand the "language of things", which resulted in innovative exhibitions and collaboration with several colleagues, especially in the worlds of fashion and design. He was a meticulous record keeper whose exhaustive documentation practices, unique to museums today, created a level of documentation that set standards in the field. Culin endeavored to document both the meanings and the origins of the objects he collected.

Culin began his career by studying the life and culture of Chinese Americans in Philadelphia. During the 1890s, while employed at the University of Pennsylvania, he turned his attention to Native American culture. After resigning from the university in 1903, Culin was appointed Curator of the Brooklyn Museum's newly established Department of Ethnology. Under the parentage of the Brooklyn Institute of Arts and Sciences (founded 1890), the museum was about to embark on a new era, "building up great ethnological collections, sending out expeditions for the acquiring of antiquities, first over all America, then over the entire world".

Culin immediately set out on a series of field trips through the Southwest, California, and the Northwest Coast. By 1911, he had collected more than nine thousand Native American objects and acquired or created an astonishing level of attendant documentation. Believing that he had collected everything necessary to represent Native Americans, he turned his interests to the cultures of Asia and finally Eastern Europe. Culin was concerned not only with finding and acquiring objects for the museum, but also with documenting the maker, the social position of the seller, the circumstances of purchase, the provenance, the use of the object, and the cultural life of the region. Thus, the collection includes information on the cultural and historical context of objects, as seen through Culin's eyes. Like his colleagues, what Culin collected and decided not to collect (both of which are documented here) are important parameters in the history of cultural representation in museums. His opinions and biases are evident throughout the collection.

Culin amassed an extensive research collection, including correspondence, manuscripts (his own and those of others), reports, publications, and clippings. A full visual record complementing the written documentation includes photographs, sketches, watercolors, oil paintings, postcards, and other illustrative study material. The depth and range of the information available in the Culin Archival Collection make it a critical resource for the study of cultural anthropology, art and cultural history, costume and textile design, ethnology, folklore, linguistics, museology, and photography on an international scale. The collection contains valuable information on the development of ethnology as a discipline, on the part played by museums in presenting and interpreting objects and cultures, and on the social and economic consequences, within native communities, of large-scale systematic collecting.

Reflecting Culin's strong interest in Native American cultures, the Archives provides a vivid account of the circumstances under which he collected and of the individuals, native and non-native, who assisted him in the field. His intellectual exchanges with several of his colleagues, such as Franz Boas from the American Museum of Natural History, George Amos Dorsey at the Field Museum, and Frank Hamilton Cushing of the Bureau of American Ethnology, are evident in his extensive correspondence files. Textual and visual materials from Cushing form an important component of the Culin Archives. Cushing, who lived with the Zuni between 1879 and 1884, was a major influence on Culin's choice of Zuni as his main collecting focus in the Southwest. Because of their close personal friendship, Culin acquired a large collection of sketches, photographs, and notes from Cushing's estate; the accompanying correspondence between Culin and Cushing provides a detailed picture of their collaboration.

Culin was among the first curators to recognize the museum installation as an art form in itself and to display ethnological collections as art objects, not as mere specimens. He had a revolutionary interest in the interchange between museum curatorship and contemporary costume and textile designers. Through his close professional relationship with M. D. C. Crawford of Women's Wear Daily he brought the museum's collections to the attention of the design community. Culin established a study room in the museum for designers to view the collections and organized traveling exhibitions for department stores around the country. The Crawford correspondence and writings are an important reflection of the evolution of a school of American design. Culin's friendship with artists is also evident in the collection, which contains correspondence from Thomas Eakins and the designer Ruth Reeves, among others.

=== The Culin Archive at the Brooklyn Museum ===
In 1903, Culin resigned from the University of Pennsylvania and became curator of Ethnology at the Institute of Arts and Sciences of the Brooklyn Museum in New York City. He began a series of collection expeditions to study Native Americans in the Southwest and California. Culin accumulated a large body of artifacts in the course of his career. Meticulous in their description, Culin captured "the maker, use of the object, social position of the seller, the circumstances of purchase, the provenance". He also exchanged letters with Franz Boas and George Amos Dorsey. In 1907 Culin unified his 14 years of theories and ideas in the seminal work Games of North American Indians, using the categories games of skill and games of chance to organize the work.

After 1907, Culin became interested in decorative art such as costume, fashion, and furniture. Working with Women's Wear Daily, he displayed contemporary fashion, changed museum rooms and created traveling exhibits to exhibit textiles and foster the study of design. As a curator at the Brooklyn Museum, Culin was instrumental in opening exhibits on the major cultures of the world. In the midst of a number of collecting expeditions to Africa, China, Japan and Europe, Culin married Alice Mumford Roberts in 1917.

From 1917 to 1928, Culin collected textiles and dresses from his trips to Eastern and Western Europe.

In the 1920s Culin made several collecting expeditions to Europe and published on Asian games, African games and European dress. Well known in the worlds of anthropology, ethnography and the fashion industry, Culin died in 1929 in Amityville, Long Island, New York.

== Criticism ==
With the focus on collecting and displaying materials as art, Culin obtained heritage objects without consent or built replicas of objects to serve as representation. As a result, his collections have faced legal restraints from the government on collecting cultural heritage objects while colleagues debate the topic of authenticity on replica materials. In 2019, The Brooklyn Museum concurred that five of the Culin's collections should be returned to the original tribes under the Native American Graves Protection and Repatriation Act of 1990.

== Writings ==
- (1883) Chinese Drug Stores in America
- (1887) The Practice of Medicine by the Chinese in America
- (1887) China In America: A Study In The Social Life Of The Chinese In The Eastern Cities Of The United States
- (1889) Chinese Games with Dice and Dominoes. Philadelphia: Oriental Club of Philadelphia. 21pp.
- (1890 March). Italian Marionettes. Journal of American Folklore, 155–157.
- (1891) Gambling Games of the Chinese in America. University of Pennsylvania Series in Philology, Literature and Archaeology 1 (4). 17pp.
- (1891) Street Games of Boys in Brooklyn. Journal of American Folklore 4, 221–237.
- (1893) Chinese Games with Dice and Dominoes. Annual Report of the U.S. National Museum 1893, 491-537
- (1893) Exhibition of Games in the Columbian Exposition. Journal of American Folklore vol. 6, no. 22, 205–227.
- (1894) Mancala, the National Game of Africa. Annual Report of the U.S. National Museum 1894, 597-606
- (1894) Popular literature of the Chinese laborers in the United States. Oriental Studies: A Selection of the Papers read before the Oriental Club of Philadelphia, 1888-1894
- (1896) Chess and Playing-Cards. Annual Report of the U.S. National Museum 1896, 665–942.
- (1898 October). American Indian Games. Journal of American Folklore, 245–252.
- (1899) Hawaiian Games. American Anthropologist (ns) 1 (2), 201–247.
- (1900) Philippine Games. American Anthropologist (ns) 2, 643–656.
- (1903) American Indian Games. American Anthropologist (ns) 5, 58–64.
- (1916) Bibliography of Japan, costume, armor, flower arrangement, gardens, archery, architecture, games, sculpture
- (1920 October) Japanese Game of Sugoroku. Brooklyn Museum Quarterly 7, 213–233.
- (1924 October) Game of Ma-Jong. Brooklyn Museum Quarterly 11, 153–168.
- (1925 July) Japanese Swinging Bat Game (paper). Brooklyn Museum Quarterly 12, 133–150.
- (1925 July) Japanese Game of Battledore and Shuttlecock. Brooklyn Museum Quarterly 12, 133–150.

=== Books ===
- Culin, Stewart; University of Pennsylvania Press(1895). Korean Games With Notes on the Corresponding Games of China and Japan. (Ed. 1958/1960) Games of The Orient. Rutland, Vermont: Charles E. Tuttle Company. 177 pages. (Ed. 1991) Korean Games With Notes on the Corresponding Games of China and Japan. Dover Publications. 256 pp. ISBN 0-486-26593-5.
- Culin, Stewart (1907). 24th Annual Report of the Bureau of American Ethnology: Games of North American Indians. Washington DC: US gov Printing Office. 846 pp. (rev. ed. 1975 ) Dover Publications. 867 pp. ISBN 0-486-23125-9. (1994) University of Nebraska Press. ISBN 0-8032-6357-0

=== Biographies ===
- Bronner Simon J. (1985)"Stewart Culin, Museum Magician." Pennsylvania Heritage 11, no. 3 (Summer), 4-11
- Bronner Simon J. (1989). Object Lessons: The Work of Ethnological Museums and Collections, in Consuming Visions: Accumulation and Display of Goods in America, 1880-1920, ed. Simon J. Bronner, 217–254. New York: W.W. Norton.
- Lawrence, Deirdre E. (1989 July). Culin: Collector and Documentor of the World he saw
- Poster, Amy G. (2014). "Stewart Culin: Chinese vernacular culture in America and the enchantment of the Museum", in Steuber, Jason, and Lai Guolong, ed., Collectors, Collections & Collecting the Arts of China: Histories & Challenges. Gainesville. University Press of Florida, pp. 99–118.

== See also ==
- Mancala
- Dice
- Mahjong
- William Henry Wilkinson
