= History of games =

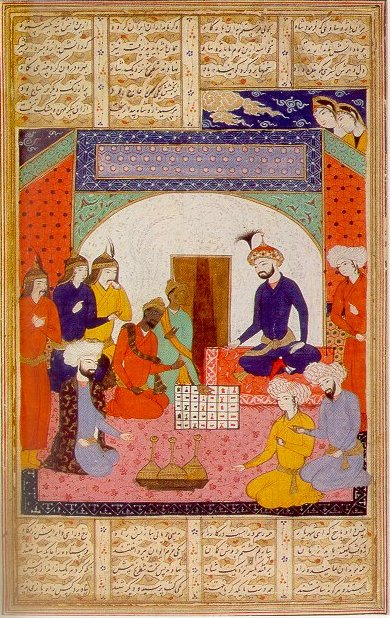
Indian Ambassadors, probably sent by the Maukhari King Śarvavarman of Kannauj, present the Chaturanga chess game to Khosrau I, from "A treatise on chess", 14th century.

The history of games dates to the ancient human past. Games are an integral part of all cultures and are one of the oldest forms of human social interaction. Games are formalized expressions of play which allow people to go beyond immediate imagination and direct physical activity. Common features of games include uncertainty of outcome, agreed upon rules, competition, separate place and time, elements of fiction, elements of chance, prescribed goals and personal enjoyment.

Games capture the ideas and worldviews of their cultures and pass them on to the future generation. Games were important as cultural and social bonding events, as teaching tools and as markers of social status. As pastimes of royalty and the elite, some games became common features of court culture and were also given as gifts. Games such as Senet and the Mesoamerican ball game were often imbued with mythic and ritual religious significance. Games like Gyan chauper and The Mansion of Happiness were used to teach spiritual and ethical lessons while Shatranj and Wéiqí (Go) were seen as a way to develop strategic thinking and mental skill by the political and military elite.

In his 1938 book, Homo Ludens, Dutch cultural historian Johan Huizinga argued that games were a primary condition of the generation of human cultures. Huizinga saw the playing of games as something that "is older than culture, for culture, however inadequately defined, always presupposes human society, and animals have not waited for man to teach them their playing". Huizinga saw games as a starting point for complex human activities such as language, law, war, philosophy and art.

== Pre-modern ==
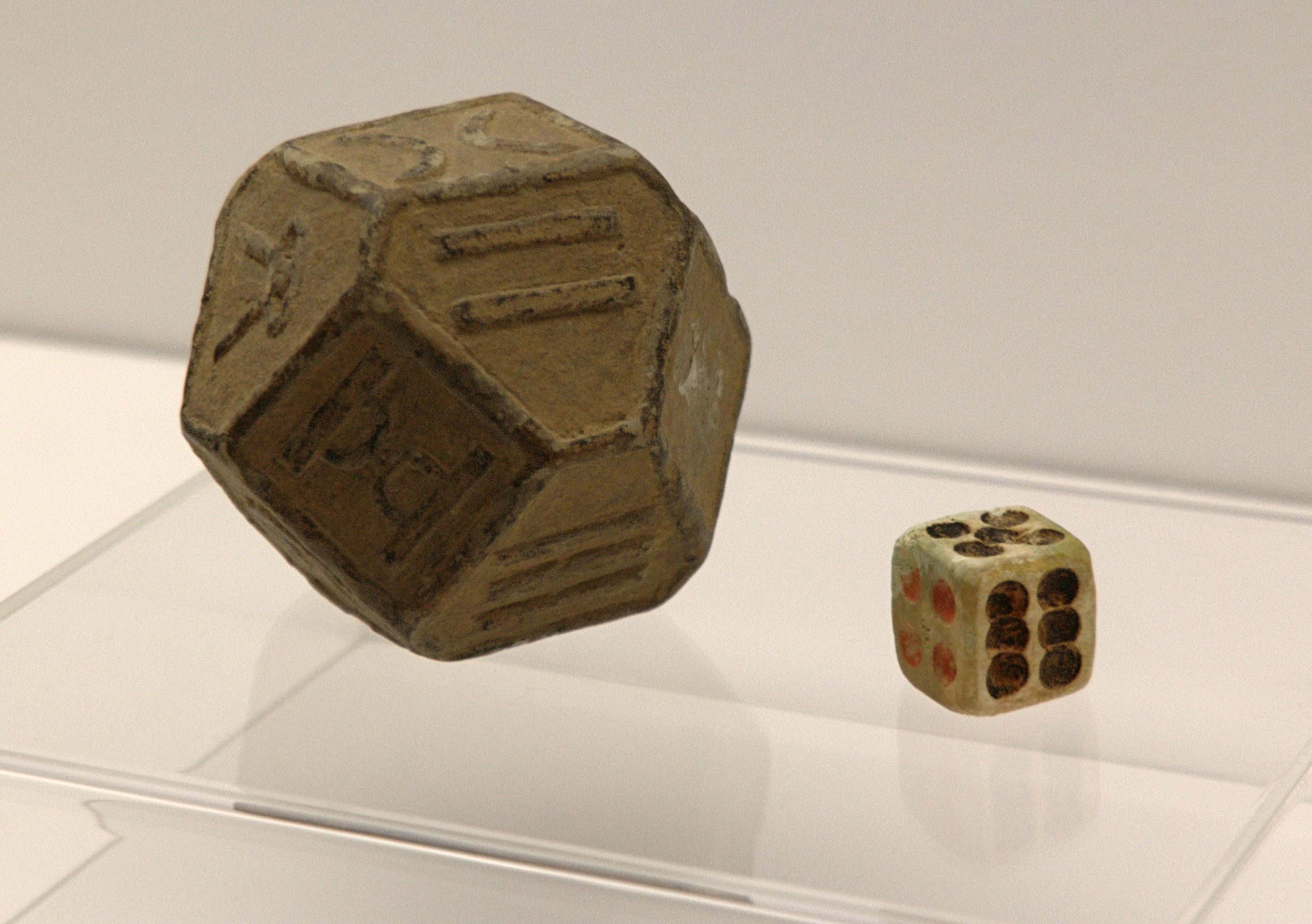
Chinese dice, Warring States (left), Tang dynasty (right)

Some of the most common pre-historic and ancient gaming tools were made of bone, especially from the Talus bone. These have been found worldwide and are the ancestors of knucklebones as well as dice games. Dice were invented at least 5,000 years ago and early dice probably did not have six sides. These bones were also sometimes used for oracular and divinatory functions. Other implements could have included shells, stones and sticks.

=== Middle East and the Mediterranean ===
Board games likely originate from the ancient Near East, based on archeological findings. A series of 49 small carved painted figures found at the 5,000-year-old Başur Höyük burial mound in southeast Turkey could represent the earliest gaming pieces ever found. Similar pieces have been found in Tell Brak and Jemdet Nasr, but they were isolated. Researches have called the find Dogs and Pigs. The earliest board games were a pastime for the elite and were sometimes given as diplomatic gifts according to a study published in Antiquity. Another possibility is that boards were reserved for the elite, but lower classes played on boards scratched into stone or on the ground. Some archeologists think that stones carved with long rows, dated between 7000 BC and 9000 BC, were used for a mancala-like game.

The earliest known board games all used dice and were for two players. Among the earliest examples of a board game is senet, a game found in Predynastic and First Dynasty burial sites in Egypt (circa 3500 BC and 3100 BC, respectively) and in hieroglyphs dating to around 3100 BC. The game was played by moving draughtsmen on a board of 30 squares arranged into three parallel rows of ten squares each. The players strategically moved their pieces based on the throw of sticks or bones. The goal was to reach the edge of the board first. Senet slowly evolved to reflect the religious beliefs of the Egyptians. The pieces represented human souls and their movement was based on the journey of the soul in the afterlife. Each square had a distinct religious significance, with the final square being associated with the union of the soul with the sun god Re-Horakhty. Senet may have also been used in a ritual religious context.

The Royal Game of Ur, or Game of Twenty Squares was played with a set of pawns on a richly decorated board and dates from 2600 to 2400 BC. It was a race game which employed a set of knucklebone dice. This game was also known and played in Egypt. A Babylonian treatise on the game written on a clay tablet shows that the game had astronomical significance and that it could also be used to tell one's fortune. The game of Ur was also popular with the lower classes, as attested by a 2,700-year-old graffiti version of the game, scratched onto a gateway to a palace in Khorsabad. Similar games have been found in Iran, Crete, Cyprus, Sri Lanka, and Syria.

Another Game of Twenty was discovered in 1977 by the Italian Archaeological Mission in grave no. 731, a pseudo-catacomb grave at Shahr-i Sokhta, a UNESCO World Heritage archaeological site in Iran. This board game set, comprising 27 pieces and four different dice, dates to 2600–2400 BCE. For the first time, the entire set has been scientifically analyzed and reconstructed by researchers , and it is considered the oldest complete and playable board game ever discovered. Games such as Nard and the Roman game Ludus Duodecim Scriptorum (game of 12 points, also known as simply "dice", lat. "alea") may have developed from this Iranian game. The Byzantine game Tabula is a descendant of the game of twelve points.

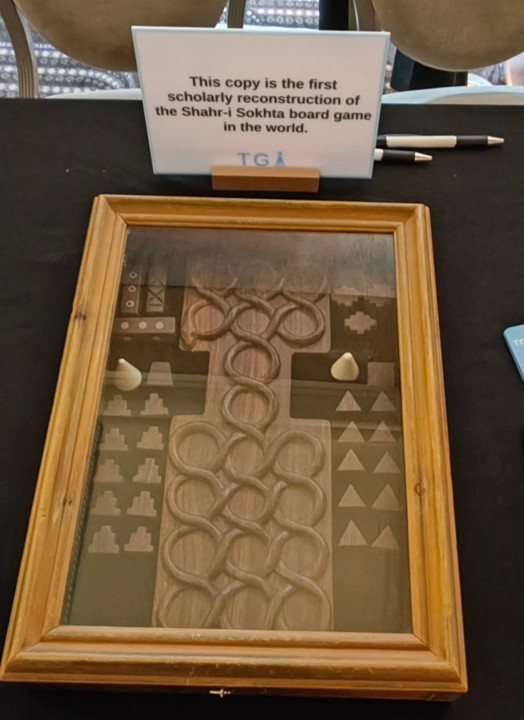
The first-ever scholarly reconstructed copy of the Shahr-i Sokhta board game

The other example of a board game in ancient Egypt is "Hounds and Jackals", also known as 58 holes. Hounds and Jackals appeared in Egypt, around 2000 BC and was mainly popular in the Middle Kingdom. The game was spread to Mesopotamia in the late 3rd millennium BC and was popular until the 1st millennium BC. More than 68 gameboards of Hounds and Jackals have been discovered in the archaeological excavations in various territories, including Syria (Tell Ajlun, Ras el-Ain, Khafaje), Israel (Tel Beth Shean, Gezer), Iraq (Uruk, Nippur, Ur, Nineveh, Ashur, Babylon), Iran (Tappeh Sialk, Susa, Luristan), Turkey (Karalhuyuk, Kultepe, Acemhuyuk), Azerbaijan (Gobustan) and Egypt (Buhen, El-Lahun, Sedment). It was a race game for two players. The gaming board consisted of two sets of 29 holes. Ten small pegs with either jackal or dog heads were used for playing. It's believed that the aim of the game was to begin at one point on the board and to reach with all figures at the other point on the board.

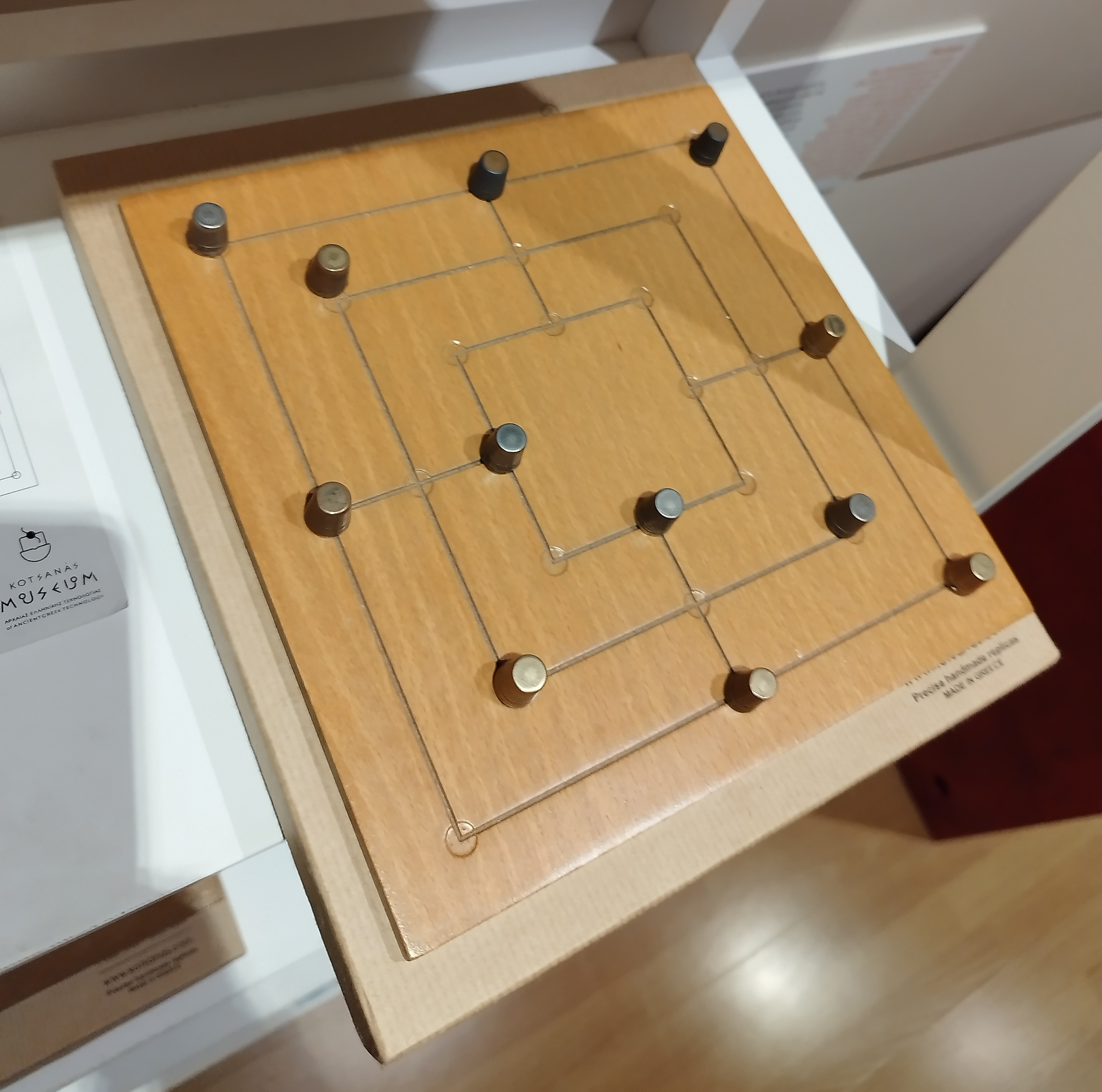
A modern reconstruction of an ancient tic tac toe version, called "enneas", in Kotsanas Museum of Ancient Greek Technology, Athens.

In Ancient Greece and in the Roman Empire, popular games included ball games (Episkyros, Harpastum, Expulsim Ludere – a kind of handball), dice games (Tesserae), knucklebones, Bear games, Tic-tac-toe (Terni Lapilli), Nine men's morris (mola) and various types of board games similar to checkers. Both Plato and Homer mention board games called 'petteia' (games played with 'pessoi', i.e. 'pieces' or 'men'). According to Plato, they are all Egyptian in origin. The name 'petteia' seems to be a generic term for board game and refers to various games. One such game was called 'poleis' (city states) and was a game of battle on a checkered board.

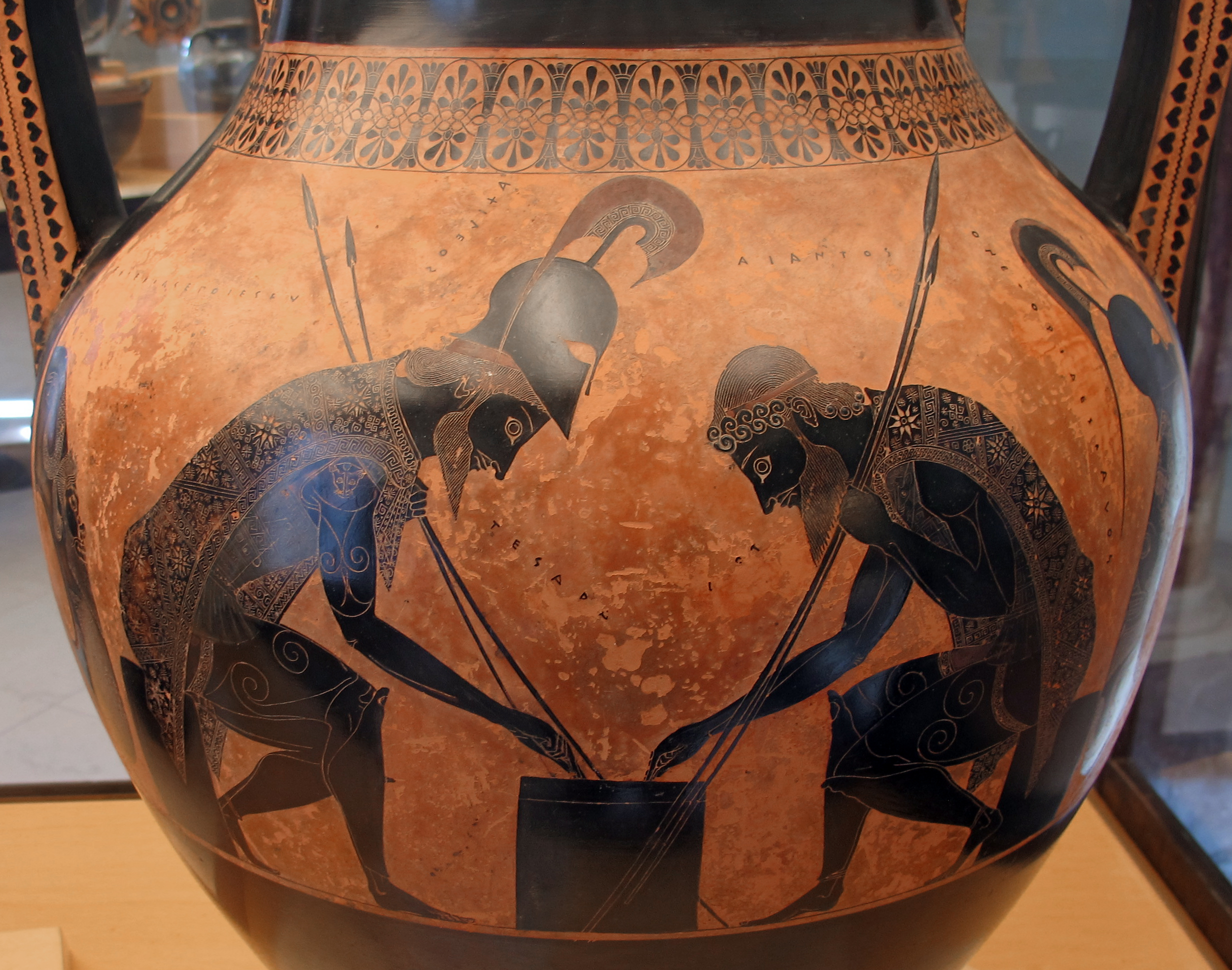
Achilles and Ajax engaged in a game of petteia, c. 540–530 BC, Vatican Museums

The Romans played a derivation of 'petteia' called 'latrunculin' or Ludus latrunculorum (the soldiers' game or the bandits' game). It is first mentioned by Varro (116–27 BC) and alluded to by Martial and Ovid. This game was extremely popular and was spread throughout Europe by the Romans. Boards have been found as far as Roman Britain. It was a war game for two players and included moving around counters representing soldiers, with 'custodian' captures made by getting one of the adversary's pieces between two of one's own.

After the Muslim conquest of Persia (638–651) Shatranj spread to the Arab world. While pre-Islamic chess sets represented Elephants, Horses, Kings and Soldiers; the Islamic prohibition against image worship led to increasing abstraction in chess set design. Islamic chess pieces were therefore simple cylindrical and rectangular shapes. The game became immensely popular during Abbasid Caliphate of the 9th century. The Abbasid Caliphs Harun al-Rashid and Al-Ma'mun were avid Shatranj players. During this period Muslim chess players published several treatises on chess problems (mansubat) and chess openings (ta'biyat). Elite players such as Al-Adli, al-Suli and Ar-Razi were called aliyat or "grandees" and played at the courts of the Caliphs and wrote about the game. Al-Adli (800–870) is known for writing Kitab ash-shatranj (book of chess), a comprehensive work on the game, including history, openings, endgames and chess problems. Al-Adli also developed a system for ranking players. During the reign of the Turko-Mongol conqueror Timur (1336–1405), a variant of chess known as Tamerlane chess was developed which some sources attribute to Timur himself who was known to be a fan of the game.

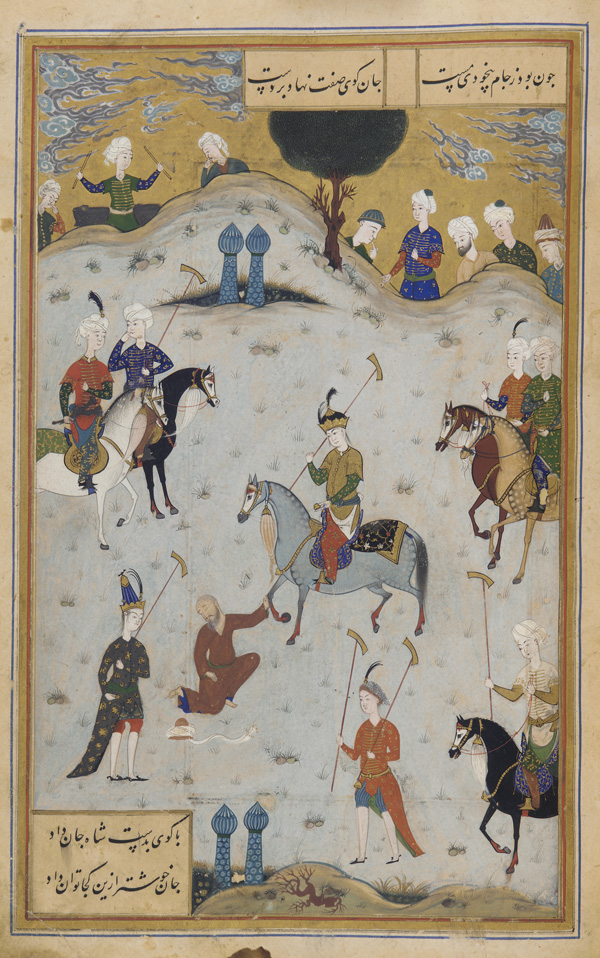
A Persian miniature illustrating the poem Guy-o Chawgân ("the Ball and the Polo-mallet") from the Safavid dynasty

Various games in the Tables family were also quite popular and are known as ifranjiah in Arabic (meaning "Frankish") and as Nard in Iran. Many of the early Arabic texts which refer to these games often debate the legality and morality of playing them. This debate was settled by the eighth century when all four Muslim schools of jurisprudence declared them to be Haraam (forbidden), however they are still played today in many Arab countries. Other popular games included Mancala and Tâb.

Polo (Persian: chawgan, Arabic: sawlajan) was first played in Sassanid Persia. It passed from Sassanid Persia to the neighboring Byzantine Empire at an early date, and a Tzykanisterion (stadium for playing polo) was built by emperor Theodosius II (r. 408–450) inside the Great Palace of Constantinople. After the Muslim conquests, it passed to the Ayyubid and Mameluke dynasties, whose elites favored it above all other sports. Notable sultans such as Saladin and Baybars were known to play it and encourage it in their court.

Playing cards were imported from Asia and India and were popular during Mamluk dynasty Egypt, featuring polo sticks, coins, swords, and cups as suits.

==== Gallery ====
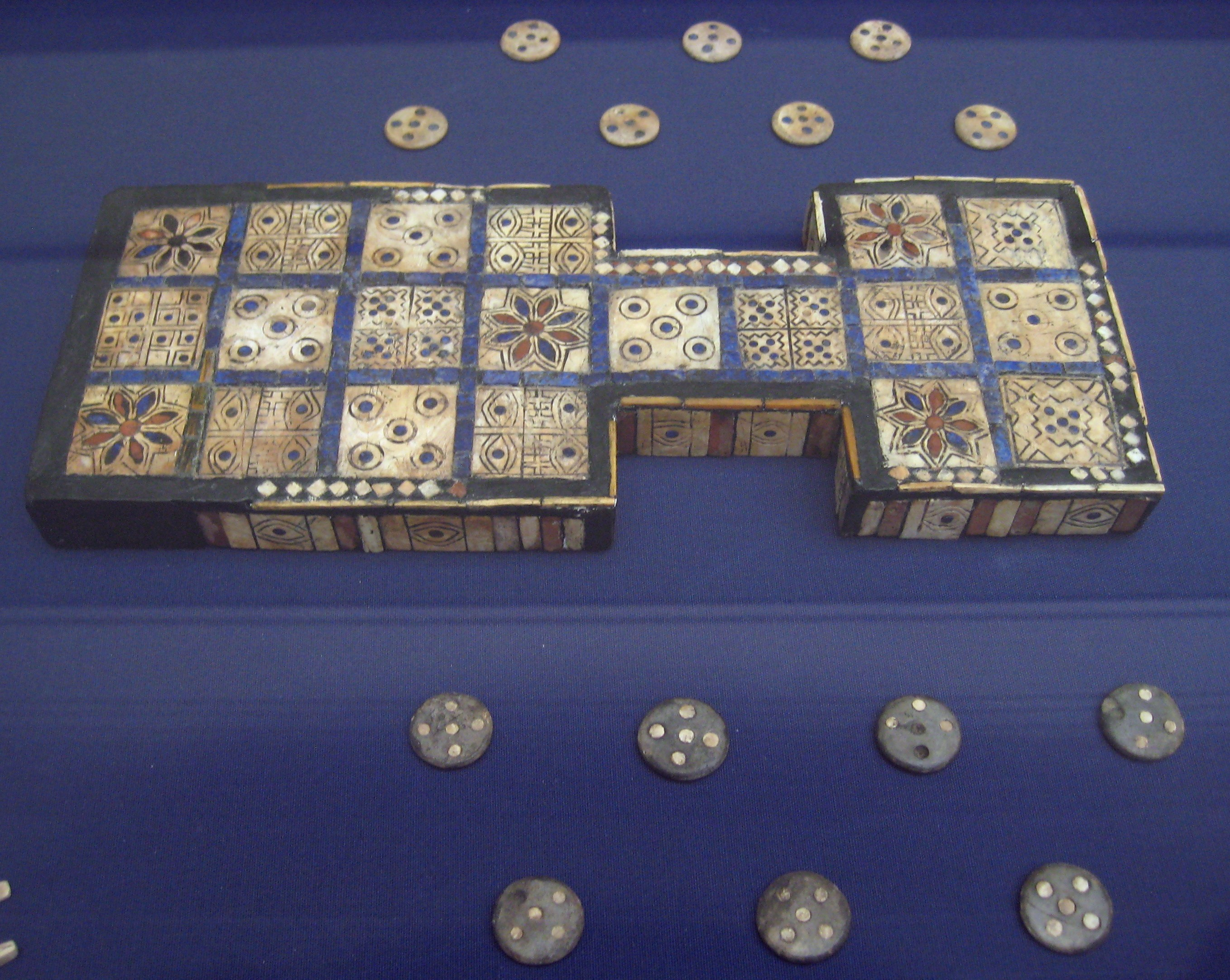
Royal Game of Ur

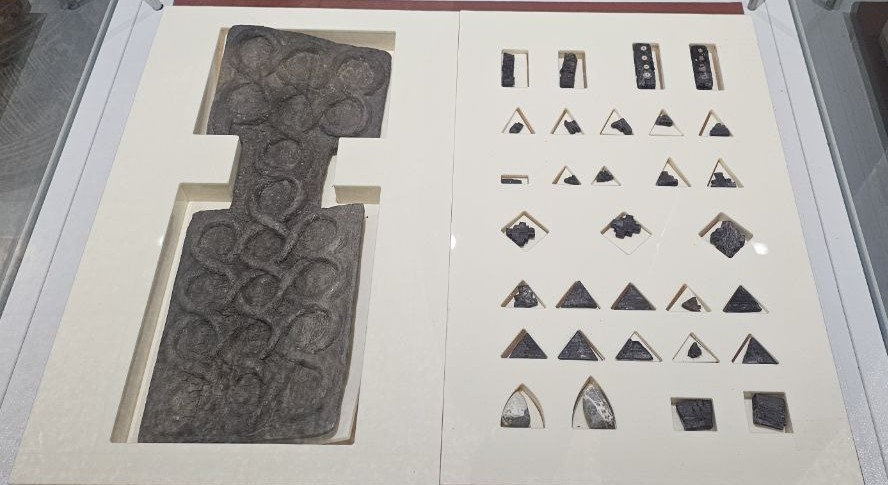
The complete set of the Shahr-i Sokhta board game with 27 pieces and 4 dice in its current condition (c. 2700 BC) National Museum of Iran

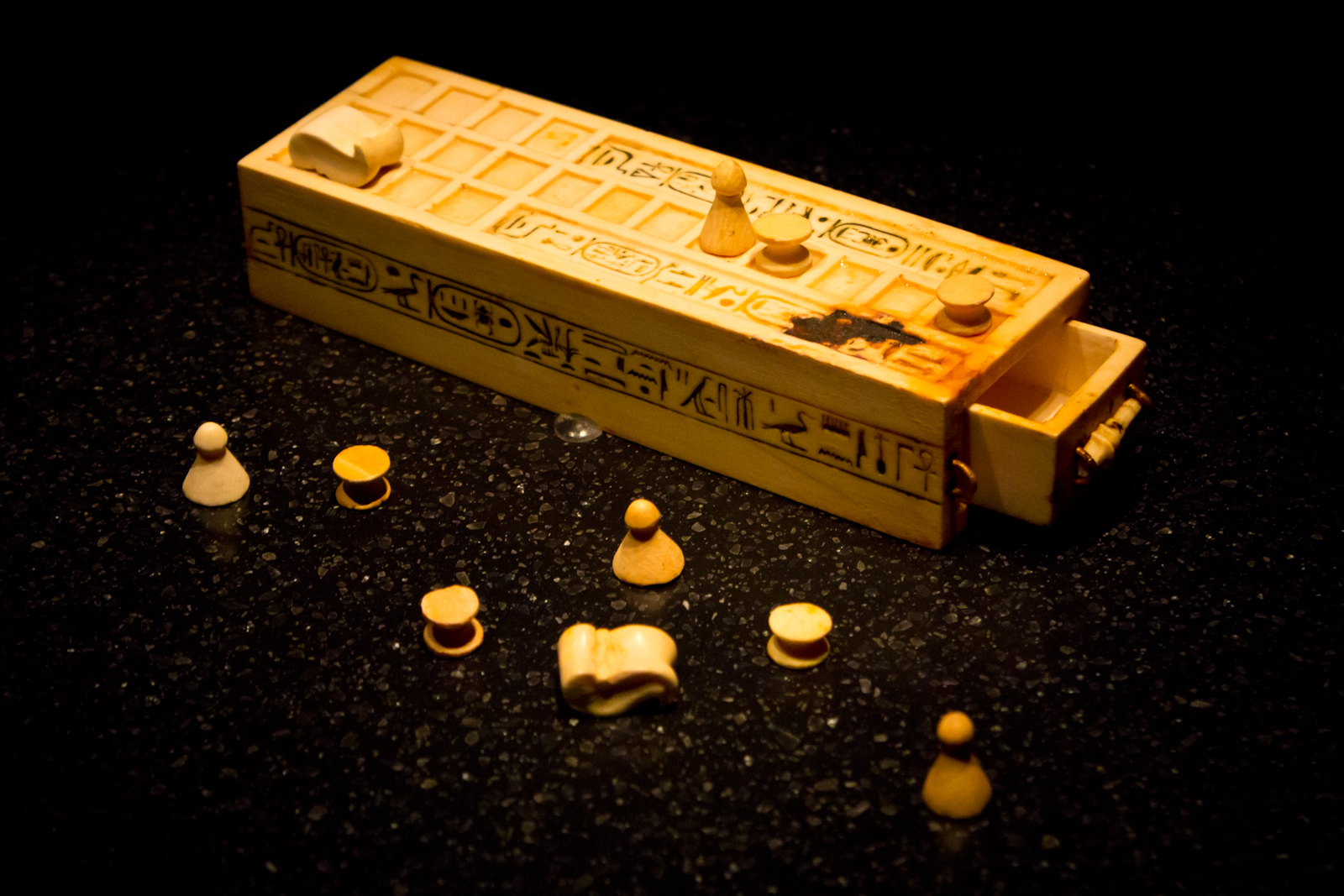
A Senet game board and game pieces from the KV62 tomb of Tutankhamun— originally from Thebes.

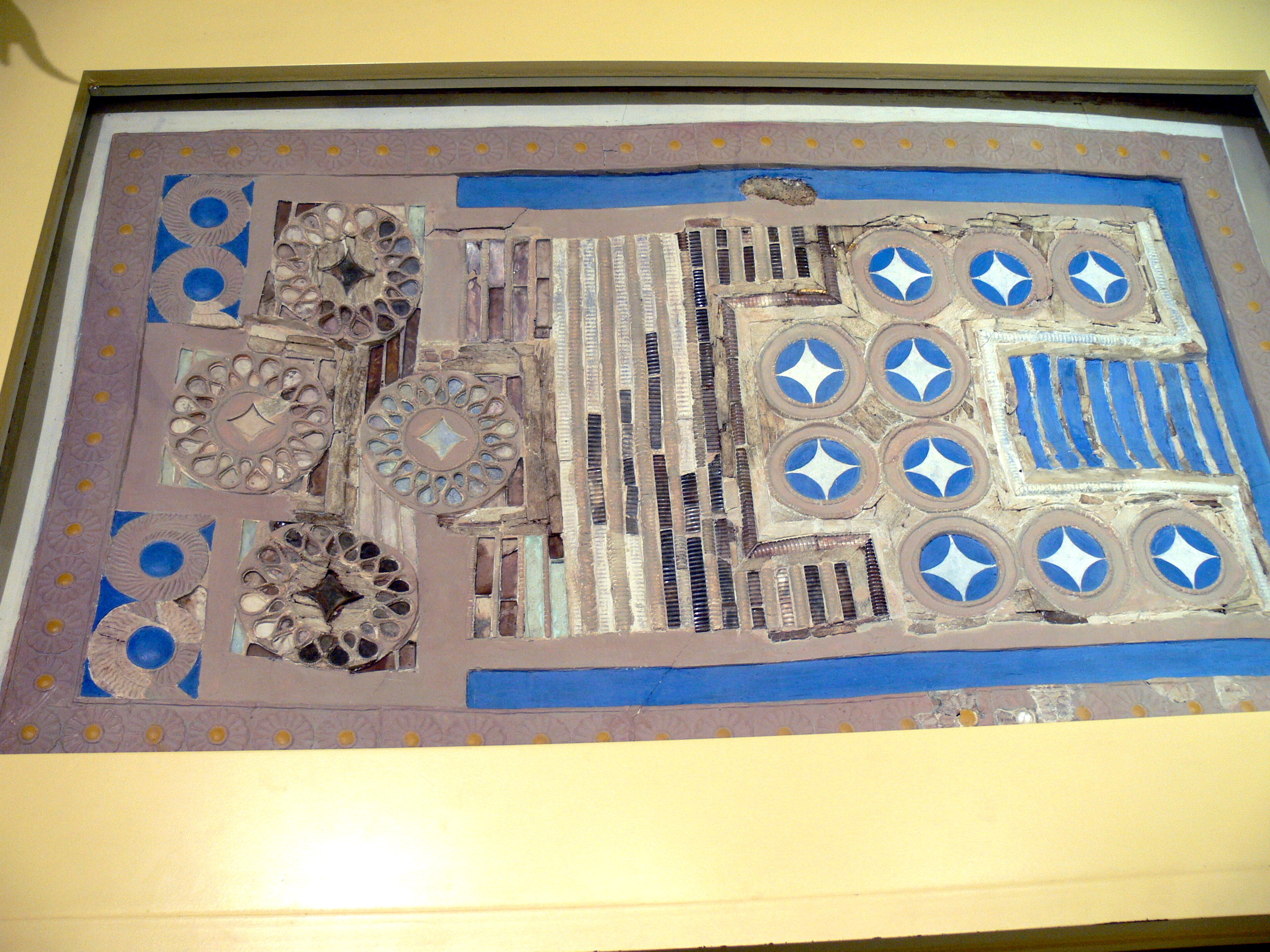
Board game with inlays of ivory, rock crystal and glass paste, covered with gold and silver leaf, on a wooden base (Knossos, New Palace period 1600–1500 BCE, Heraklion Archaeological Museum, Crete)

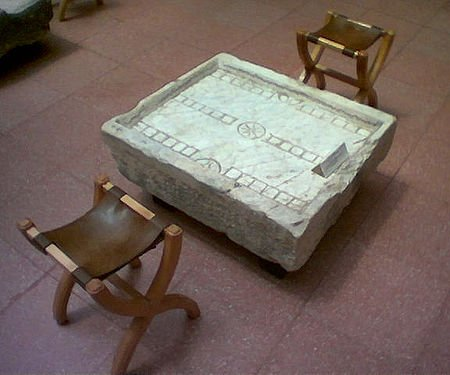
Ludus duodecim scriptorum table in the museum at Ephesus, an ancestor of backgammon.

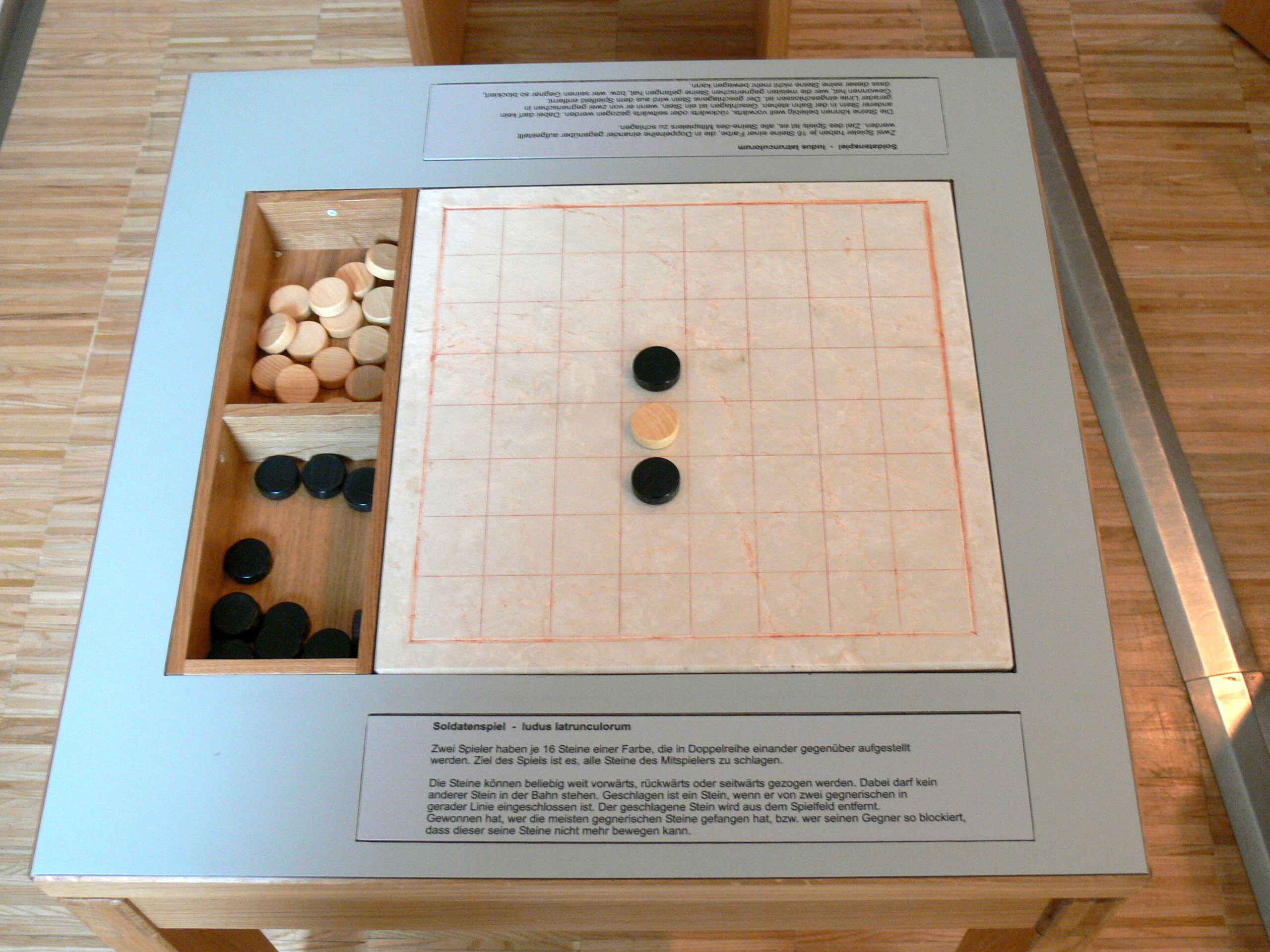
Modern reconstruction of the Roman board game Ludus latrunculorum (the bandits' game or the soldier's game), Museum Quintana of Archaeology, in Künzing, Germany

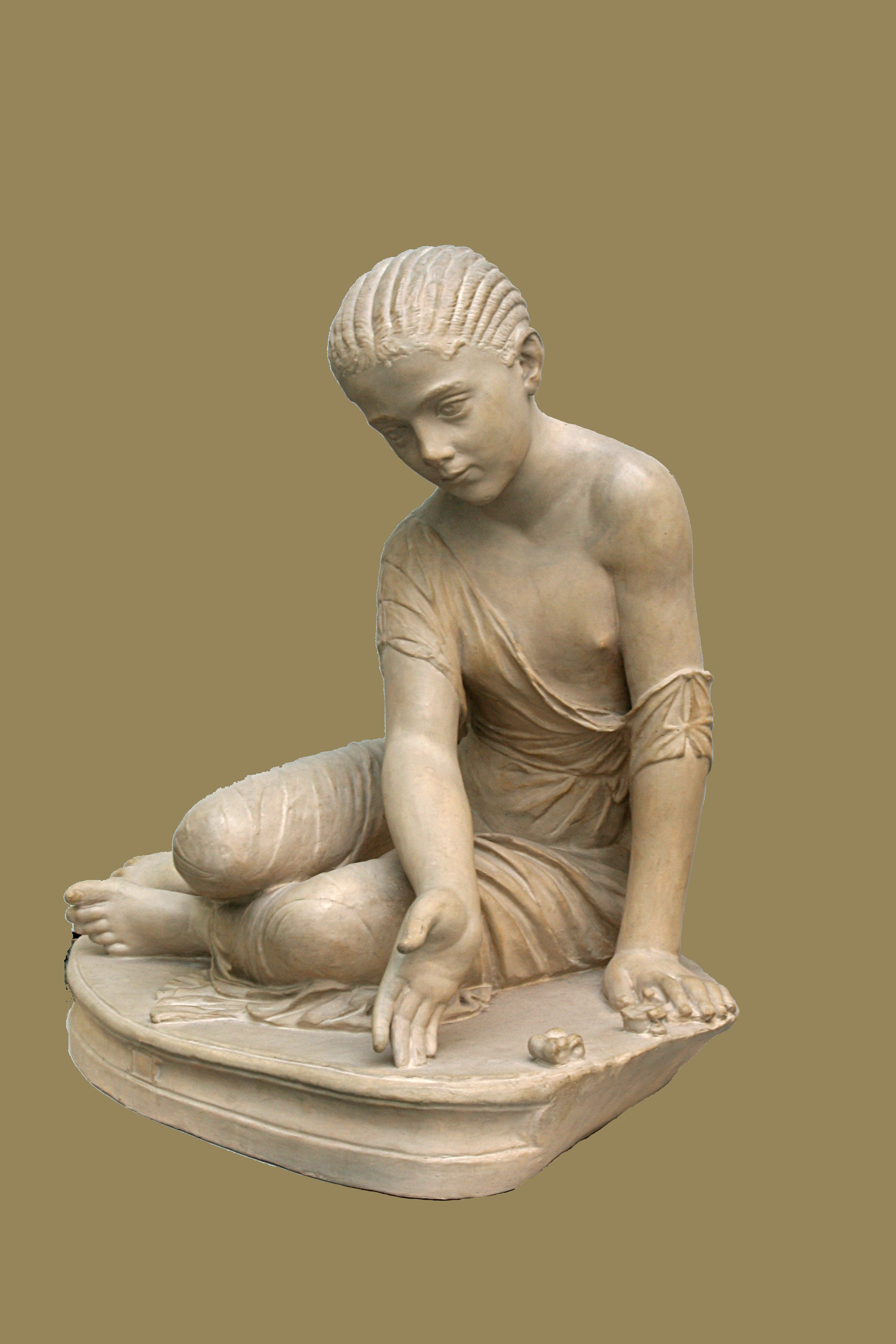
Roman statue of a girl playing astragaloi, 150–130 BCE. Berlin, Antikenmuseum.

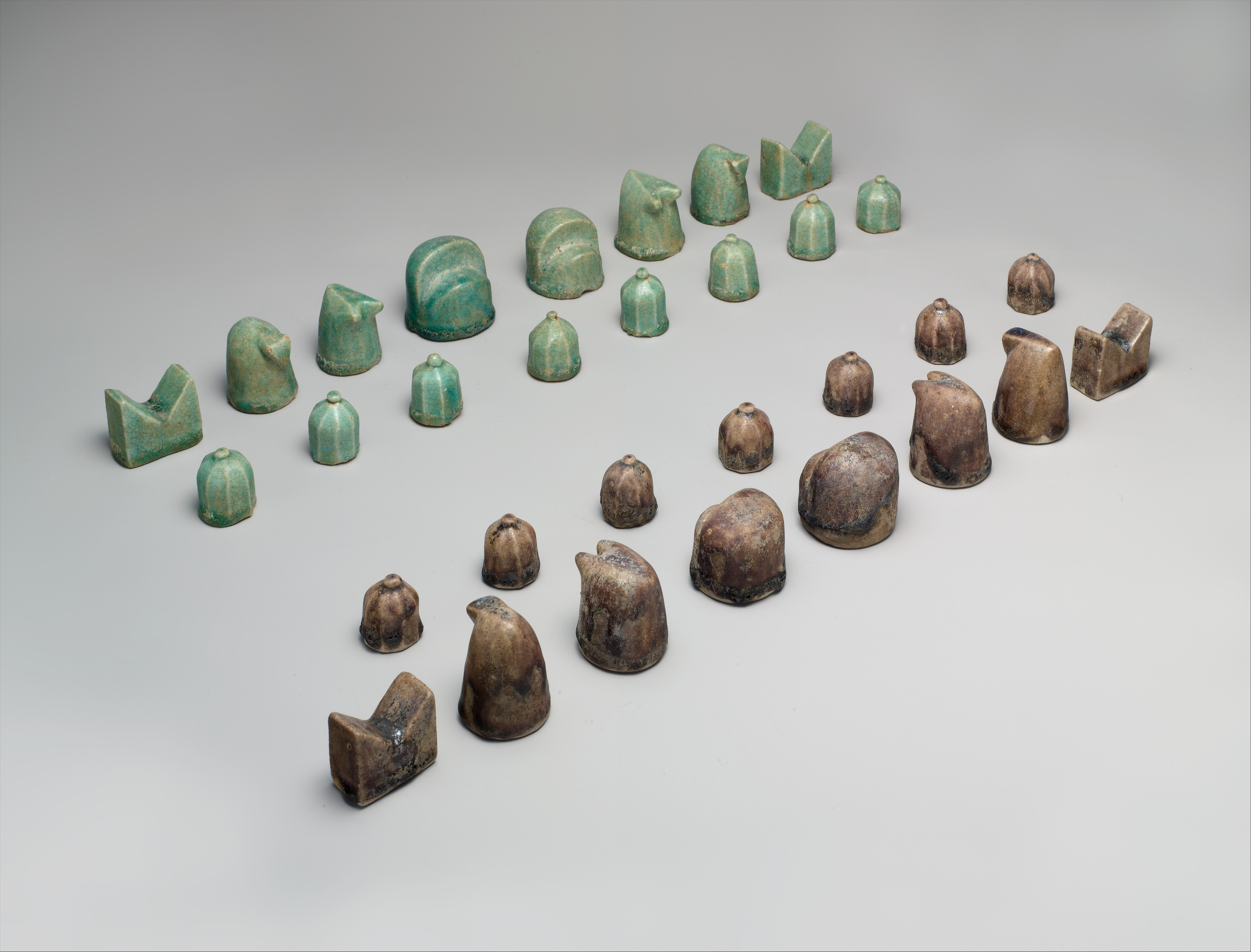
Shatranj set, glazed fritware, 12th century

=== India ===
India saw a number of games in ancient period ranging from the various dice games to other board games. The use of cubical and oblong dice was common in the Indus Valley Harappan civilization (c. 2300 BC). Archaeological excavations have found gambling dice in monasteries and other Buddhist sites. The earliest textual mention of games in India is the Rig-Veda's mention of the use of dice (c. 1000 BC). Texts such as the Mahabharata indicate that dice games were popular with Kings and royalty, and also had ceremonial purposes. Cowry shells were also widely used.

Another early reference is the list of Buddha games (circa 500 BC) which is a list from the Pali Canon that Buddhist monks were forbidden to play. This list mentions games on boards with 8 or 10 rows (Ashtapada and Daśapada), games which use floor diagrams (one game called Parihâra-patham is similar to hop-scotch), dice games and ball games. Ashtapada and Daśapada were race games.

Chaturanga (which means 'quadripartite' and also 'army'), the predecessor of chess, possibly developed in the Indian subcontinent or Central Asia during the Kushan (30–375 AD) or Gupta (320–550 AD) periods from an amalgamation of other game features and was transmitted to Sassanid Persia (where it was known as Shatranj) and China through the Silk Road. It was divided into four parts called angas, which were symbolic of the four branches of an army. Just like the real ancient Indian army, it had pieces called elephants, chariots, horses and soldiers, and was played to devise war strategies.

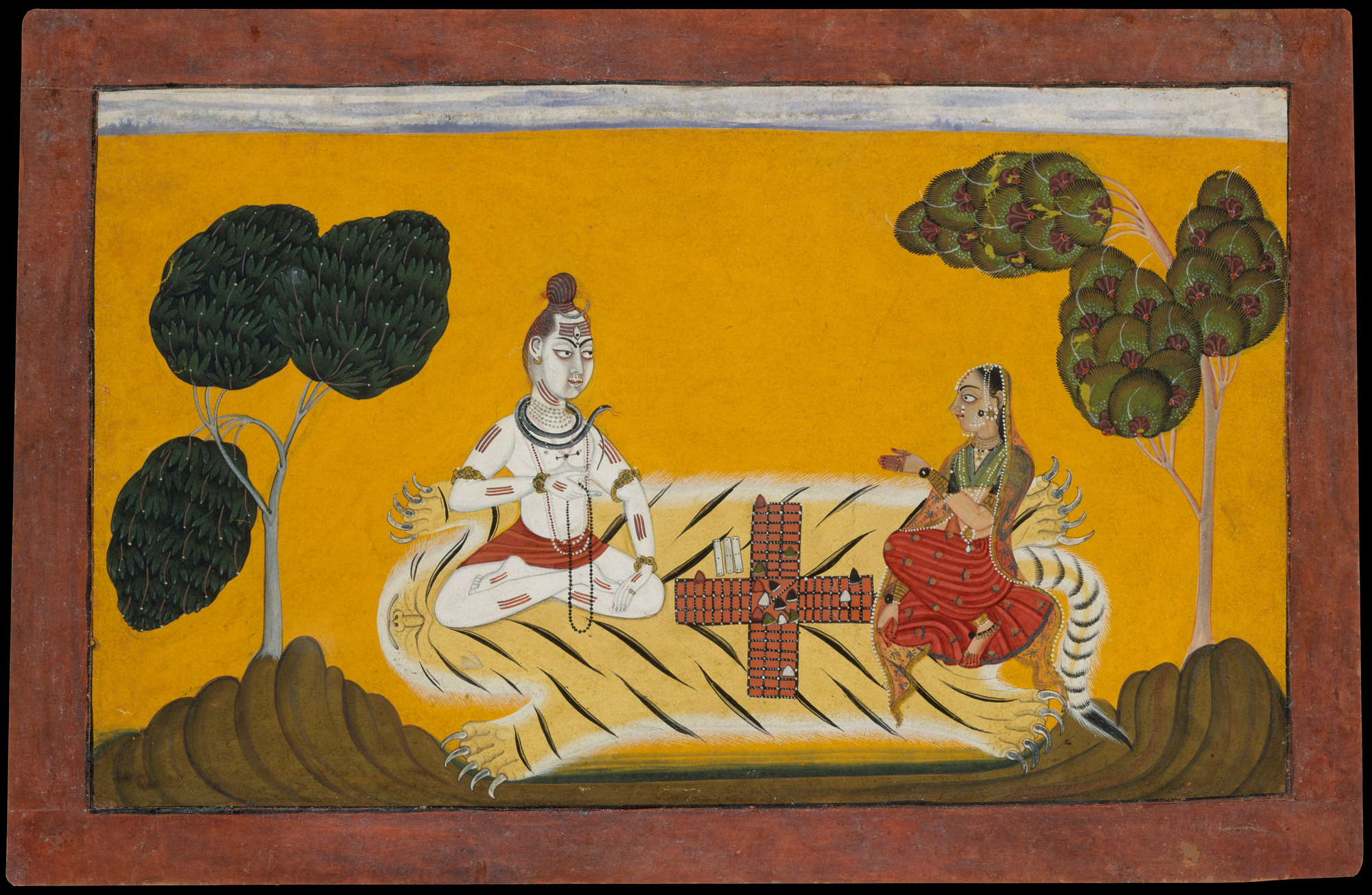
Hindu deities Shiva and Parvati playing chaupar, ca 1694–95

The word 'checkmate' comes from the Persian term in the game, ‘shah mat’, meaning 'the king is dead'. Another game named chaturaji was similar but played with four sides of differing colors instead of two, however the earliest source for this four sided board game is Al-Biruni's 'India', circa 1030 AD. Historians of chess such as Yuri Averbakh have surmised that the Greek board game petteia may have had an influence on the development of early chaturanga. Petteia games could have combined with other elements in the Greco-Bactrian and Indo-Greek Kingdoms.

The game of carrom is said to have originated in the Indian subcontinent. Though there isn't any particular proof, it is said that Indian Maharajas invented the game centuries ago. There was a finding of an ancient glass carrom board in Patiala, Punjab. Carrom gained popularity after World War I, and is still a widely popular board game in India.

Adding on, the game of 'Snakes and Ladders', previously known as vaikuntapaali, was originally a Hindu game. It has been speculated that this game was already being played in India as early as the 2nd century AD. Others have credited the invention of the game to Dnyaneshwar (known also as Dnyandev), a Marathi saint who lived during the 13th century AD. This game is also known by names like gyan chaupar (meaning 'game of knowledge) or mokshapat and moksha patamu (both meaning 'way to deliverance').

The game now known as 'ludo' – was originally called pachisi (/pəˈtʃiːzi/). The board was made out of cloth or jute. A depiction of pachisi is found in the caves of Ajanta Caves in Maharashtra, showing that the game was quite popular in the Medieval Era. Cross and circle games such as chaupar and pachisi may be very old games, but so far their history has not been established prior to the 16th century. Chaupar was a popular gambling game at the court of Mughal emperor Akbar the Great (1556–1605). The emperor himself was a fan of the game and was known to play on a courtyard of his palace using slaves as playing pieces. Karuna Sharma of Georgia State University noted the political side of these board games played at the court.

The game of seven stones is mentioned in the Bhāgvata Purāna, a text written in 1000 AD at the latest. Several variations of tag, such as kho kho, kabaddi, atya patya, and langdi (sport), are believed to be hundreds or thousands of years old (or even older as non-human animals are known to play tag), with kho-kho having been played since at least the fourth century BC, certain aspects of kabaddi possibly being mentioned in the Mahabharata (in or before 300 AD), and atya-patya being mentioned in the Naṟṟiṇai (in or before 300 AD).

=== East Asia ===
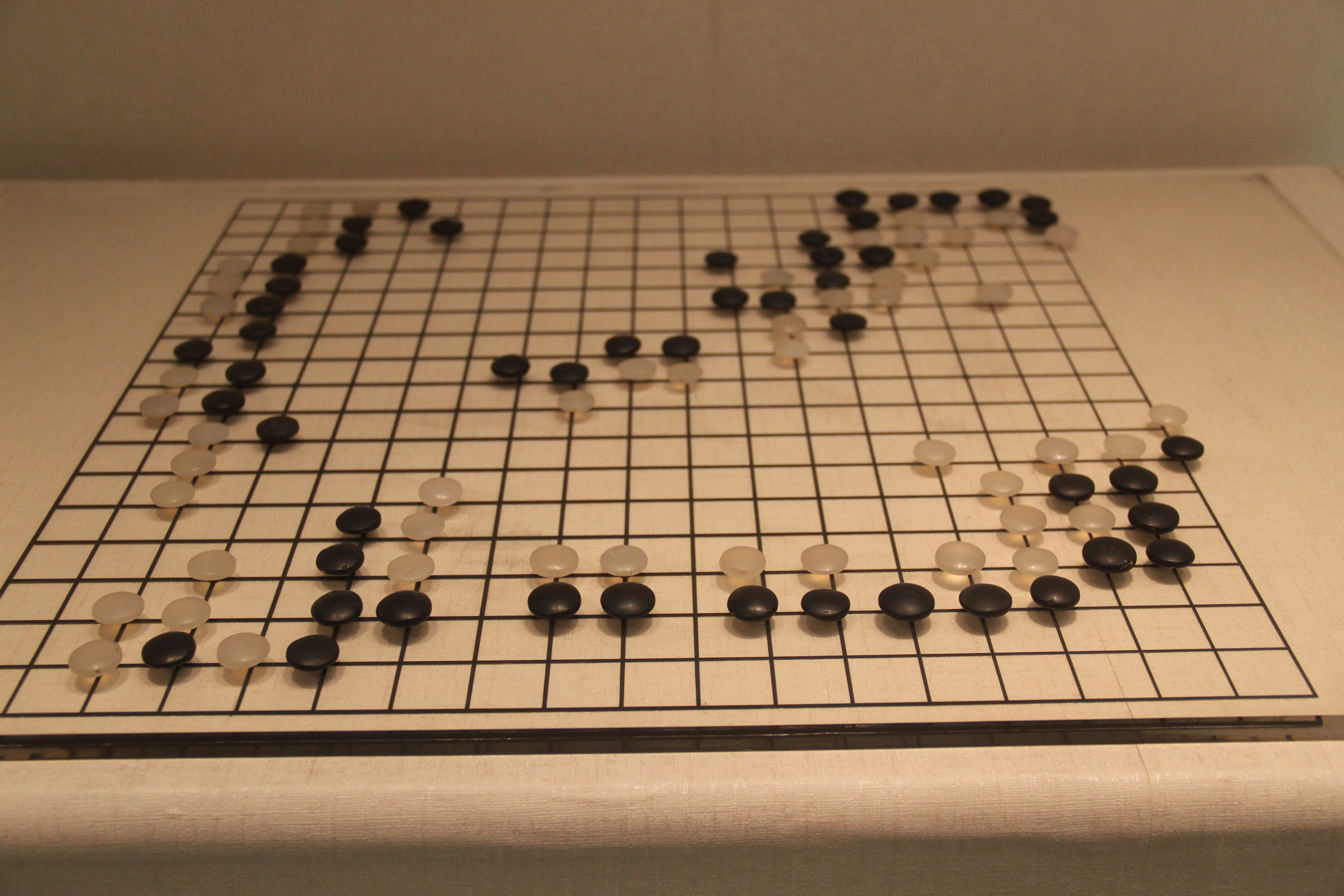
Agate Go pieces, Liao dynasty

The extinct Chinese board game liubo was invented no later than the middle of the 1st millennium BCE, and was popular during the Warring States period (476 BC – 221 BC) and the Han dynasty (202 BC – 220 AD). Although the game's rules have been lost, it was apparently a race game not unlike Senet in that playing pieces were moved about a board using sticks thrown to determine movement.

Go, also known as Weiqi, Igo, or Baduk (in Chinese, Japanese, and Korean, respectively), is first mentioned in the historical annal Zuo Zhuan (c. 4th century BC). It is also mentioned in Book XVII of the Analects of Confucius and in two of the books of Mencius (c. 3rd century BC). In ancient China, Go was one of the four cultivated arts of the Chinese scholar gentleman, along with calligraphy, painting and playing the musical instrument guqin, and examinations of skill in those arts was used to qualify candidates for service in the bureaucracy. Go was brought to Korea in the second century BC when the Han dynasty expanded into the Korean peninsula and it arrived in Japan in the 5th or 6th century AD and it quickly became a favorite aristocratic pastime.

Chinese Chess or Xiangqi seems to have been played during the Tang dynasty, any earlier attestation is problematic. Several Xiangqi pieces are known from the Northern Song dynasty (960–1126). It is unknown exactly how Xiangqi developed. Other traditional East Asian Chess variants include Shogi (Japan) and Janggi (Korea).

Playing cards or tiles were invented in China as early as the 9th century during the Tang dynasty (618–907). The earliest unambiguous attestation of paper playing cards date back to 1294.

The modern game of Dominoes developed from early Chinese tile based games. What appears to have been the earliest references to gaming tiles are mentions of kwat pai, or "bone tiles", used in gambling, in Chinese writings no later than 900 AD. The earliest definite references to Chinese dominoes are found in the literature of the Song dynasty (960–1279), while Western-style dominoes are a more recent variation, with the earliest examples being of early-18th century Italian design. The modern tile game Mahjong is based on older Chinese card games like Khanhoo, peng hu, and shi hu.

The pre-modern Chinese also played ball games such as Cuju which was a ball and net game similar to football, and Chuiwan, which is similar to modern golf.

==== Gallery ====
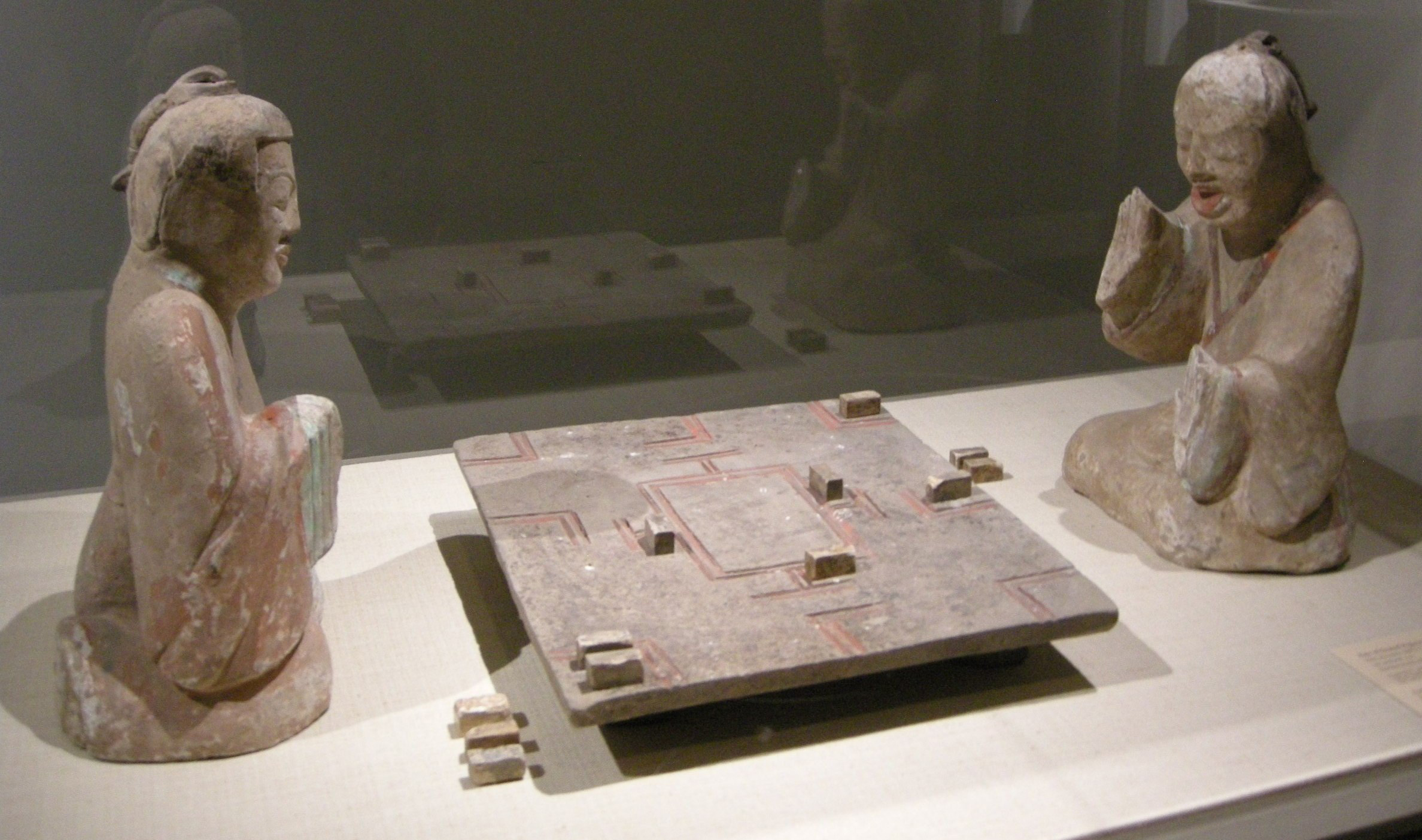
A pair of Eastern Han dynasty (25–220 AD) ceramic tomb figurines of two gentlemen playing liubo

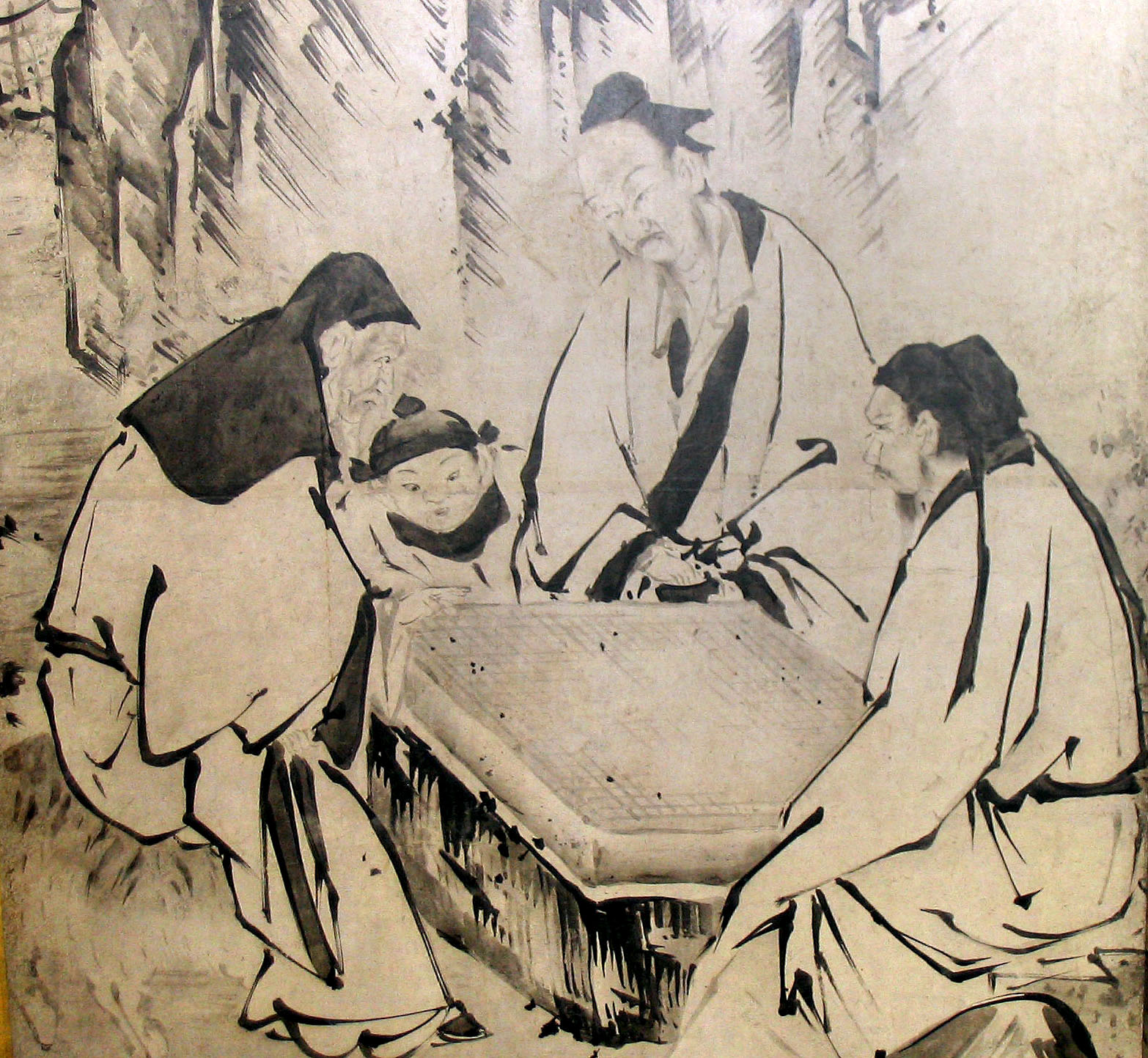
A screen painting depicting people of the Ming dynasty playing Go, by Kanō Eitoku

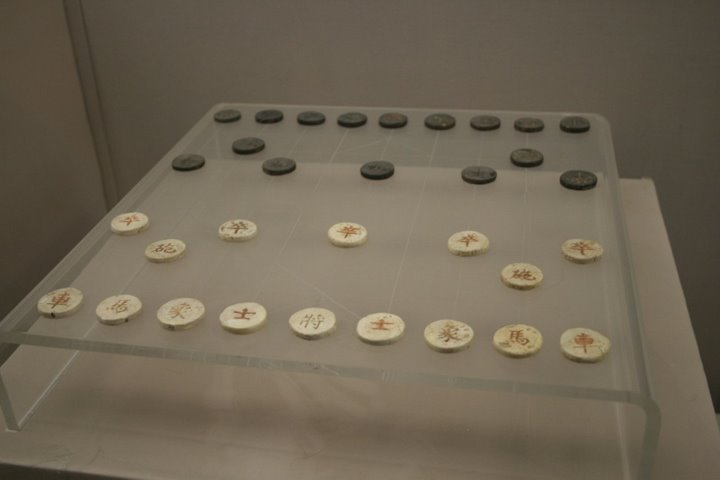
Xiangqi game pieces dated to the Song dynasty (960–1279)

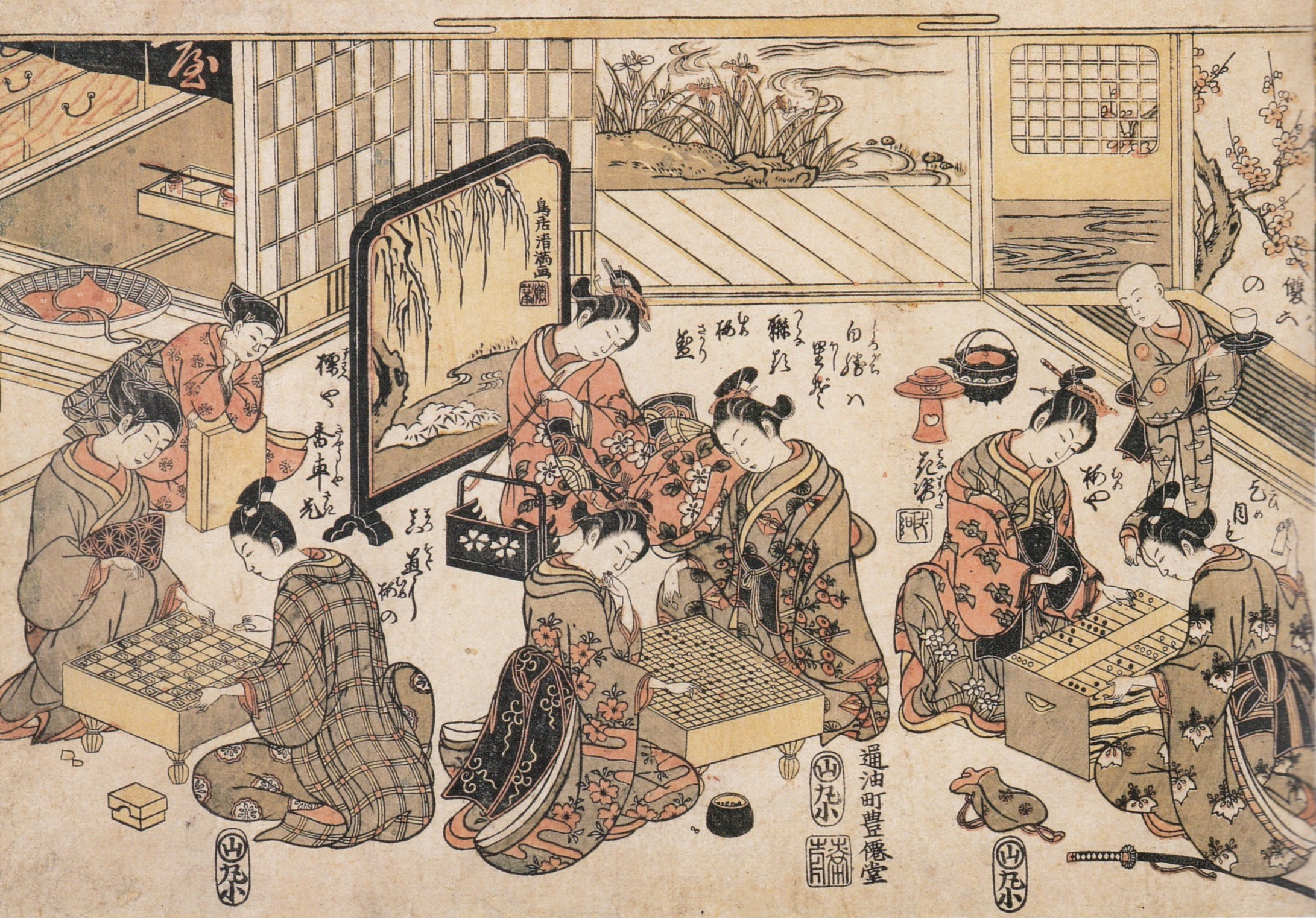
Shogi, Go and Sugoroku; Japan, 1780.

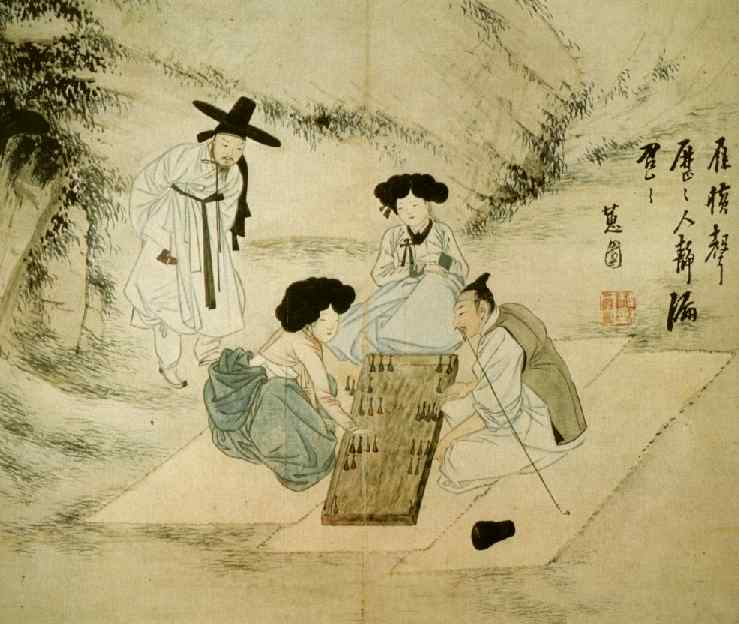
Players and observers alike absorbed in a Ssangryuk game during the Joseon era.

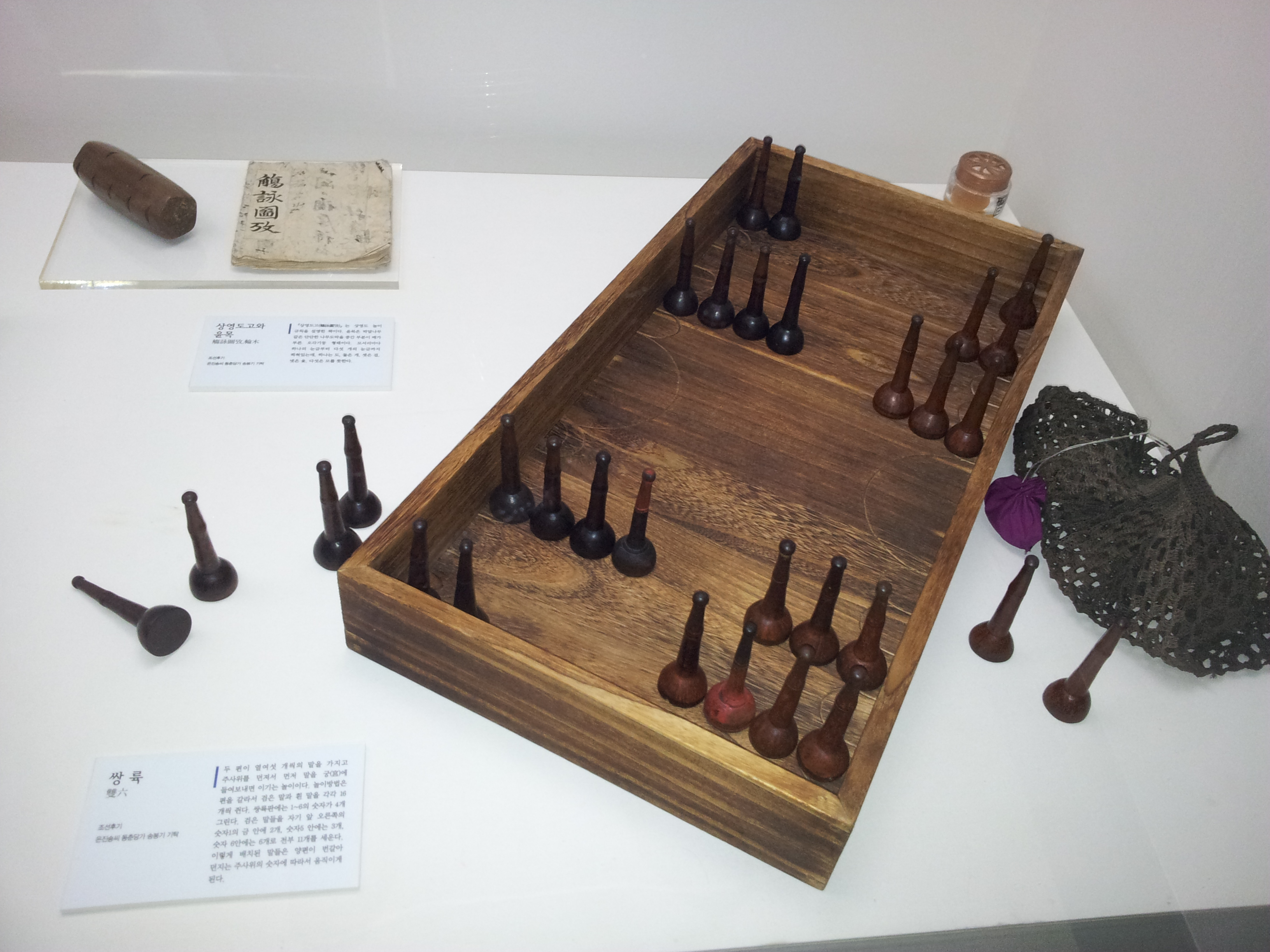
Late Joseon period Ssangnyuk board game set

=== Africa ===
The most widespread of the native African games is Mancala. Mancala is a family of board games played around the world, sometimes called "sowing" games, or "count-and-capture" games, which describes the gameplay. The word mancala:منقلة comes from the Arabic word naqala:نقلة meaning literally "to move". The earliest evidence of Mancala consists of fragments of pottery boards and several rock cuts found in Aksumite in Ethiopia, Matara (now in Eritrea), and Yeha (also in Ethiopia), which have been dated by archaeologists to between the 6th and 7th century CE. More than 800 names of traditional mancala games are known, and almost 200 invented games have been described. However, some names denote the same game, while some names are used for more than one game. Today, the game is played worldwide, with many distinct variants representing different regions of the world. Some historians believe that mancala is the oldest game in the world based on the archaeological evidence found in Jordan that dates around 6000 BC. The game might have been played by ancient Nabataeans and could have been an ancient version of the modern mancala game.

=== Americas ===
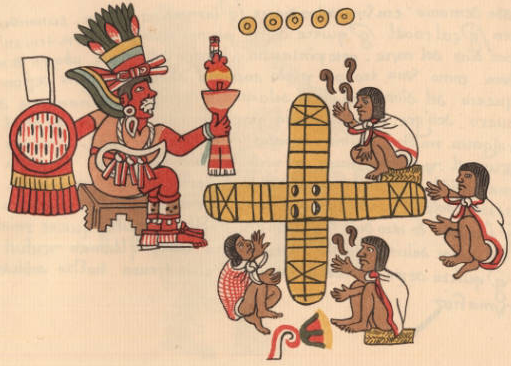
Patolli game being watched by Macuilxochitl as depicted on page 048 of the Codex Magliabechiano

Archaeologist Barbara Voorhies has theorized that a series of holes on clay floors arranged in c shapes at the Tlacuachero archaeological site in Mexico's Chiapas state may be 5000-year-old dice-game scoreboards. If so this would be the oldest archaeological evidence for a game in the Americas.

Dice games were popular throughout the Americas. Patolli was one of the most popular board games played by Mesoamerican peoples such as the Mayans, Toltecs and Aztecs, it was a race game played with beans or dice on square and oval-shaped boards and gambling was a key aspect of it. The Andean peoples also played a dice game which is called by the Quechua word pichca or pisca.

One of the oldest known ball games in history is the Mesoamerican ballgame (Ōllamaliztli in Nahuatl). Ōllamaliztli was played as far back as 1,400 BC and had important religious significance for the mesoamerican peoples such as the Maya and Aztec. The game evolved over time, but the main goal was to keep a solid rubber ball in play by striking it with various parts of the body or with tools such as rackets. The game may have served as a proxy for warfare and also had a major religious function. Formal ballgames were held as ritual events, often featuring human sacrifice, though it was also played for leisure by children and even women.

The indigenous North American peoples played various kinds of stickball games, which are the ancestors of modern lacrosse. Traditional stickball games were sometimes major events that could last several days. As many as 100 to 1,000 men from opposing villages or tribes would participate. The games were played in open plains located between villages, and the goals could range from 500 yards (460 m) to 6 miles (9.7 km) apart.

=== Europe ===
The Tafl games were a family of ancient Germanic and Celtic board games played across much of Northern Europe from earlier than 400 CE until the 12th century. Although the rules of the games were never explicitly recorded, it seems to have been a game with uneven forces (2:1 ratio) and the goal of one side was to escape to the side of the board with a King while the other side's goal was to capture him. Tafl was spread by the Vikings throughout northern Europe, including Iceland, Britain, Ireland, and Sápmi.

Chess was introduced to the Iberian emirate of Cordoba in 822 during the reign of Abd ar-Rahman II. By the middle of the 10th century, it was being played in Christian Spain, Italy and Southern Germany. By 1200, it had reached Britain and Scandinavia. Initially there were many differing local Chess games with varying rules or assizes such as Short assize chess, Courier chess and Dice Chess.

An important source of medieval games is the Libro de los juegos, ("Book of games"), or Libro de acedrex, dados e tablas, ("Book of chess, dice and tables", in Old Spanish) which was commissioned by Alfonso X of Castile, Galicia and León in 1283. The manuscript contains descriptions and color illustrations of dice games, chess and tabula, a predecessor of backgammon. The book portrays these games within an astrological context, and some game variants are astronomically designed, such as a game titled "astronomical chess", played on a board of seven concentric circles, divided radially into twelve areas, each associated with a constellation of the Zodiac. The symbolism of the text indicates that some of these games were given metaphysical significance. Chess was also used to teach social and moral lessons by the Dominican friar Jacobus de Cessolis in his Liber de moribus hominum et officiis nobilium super ludo scacchorum ('Book of the customs of men and the duties of nobles or the Book of Chess'). Published circa 1300, the book was immensely popular.

Other pre-modern European board games include Rithmomachy or "the philosophers game", alquerque, fox & geese, nine men's morris, draughts, nim, catch the hare and the game of the goose. Dice games were widely played throughout Europe and included hazard, chuck-a-luck, Glückshaus, shut the box and knucklebones.

Card games first arrived in Italy from Mamluk Egypt in the 14th century, with suits very similar to the Swords, Clubs, Cups and Coins and those still used in traditional Italian and Spanish decks. The four suits most commonly encountered today (spades, hearts, diamonds, and clubs) appear to have originated in France circa 1480. 1440s Italy saw the rise of tarot cards and this led to the development of tarot card games such as tarocchini, Königrufen and French tarot.

Outdoor games were very popular during holidays and fairs and were played by all classes. Many of these games are the predecessors of modern sports and lawn games. Boules, lawn billiards (later brought indoors as billiards), skittles (an ancestor of modern ten pin bowling), medieval football, kolven, stoolball (an ancestor of cricket), jeu de paume (early racket-less tennis), horseshoes and quoits all predate the early modern era.

==== Gallery ====
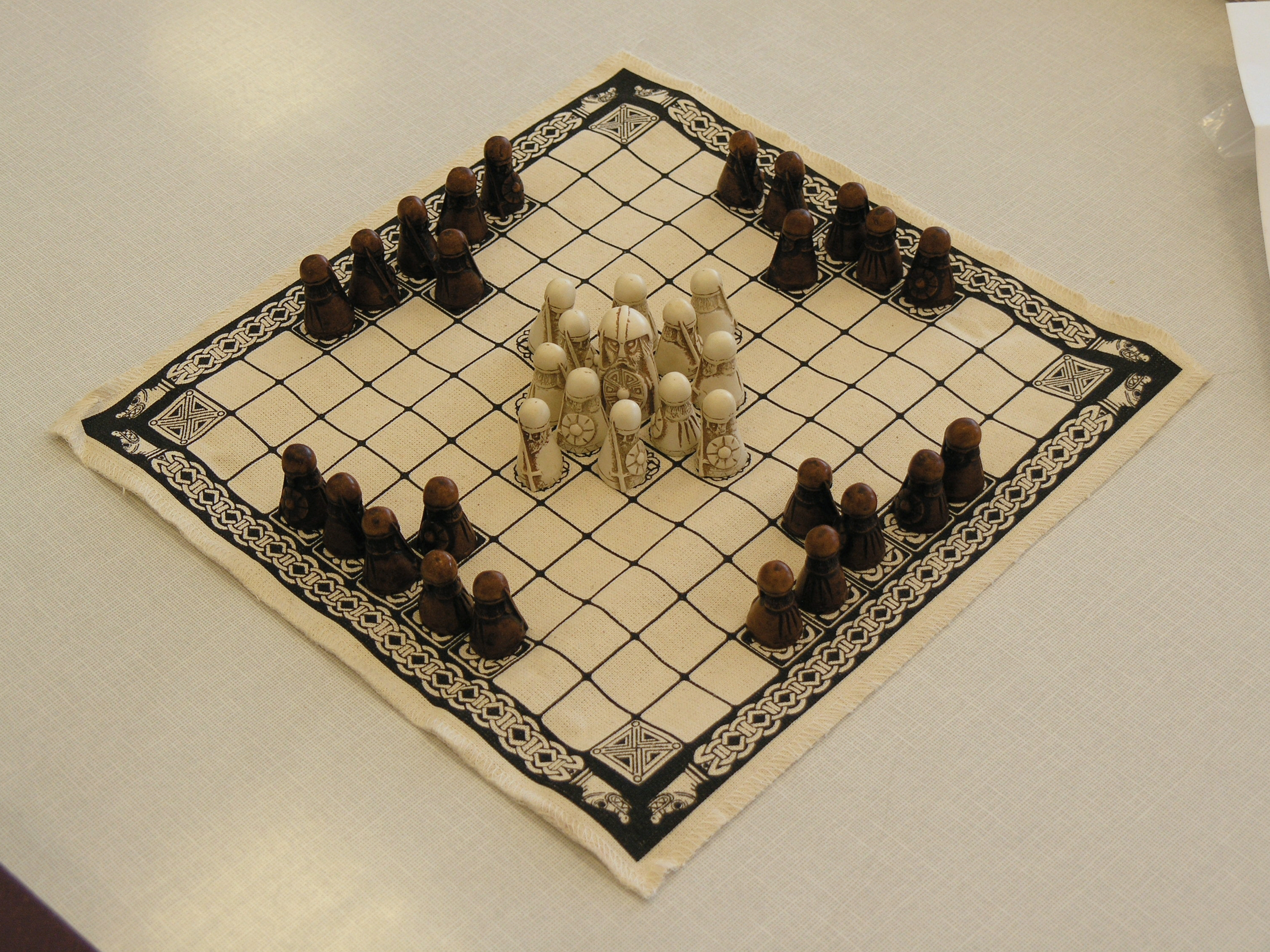
Hnefatafl reconstruction

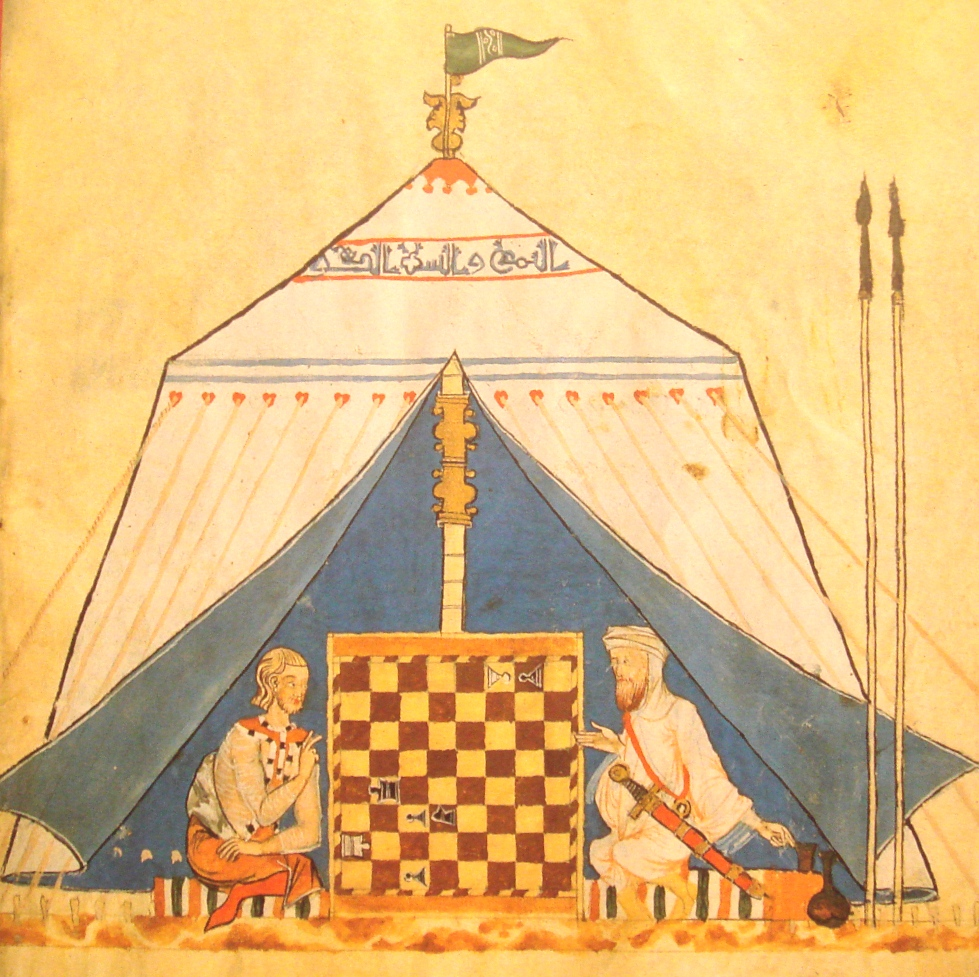
Christian and Muslim playing chess. Libro de los juegos.

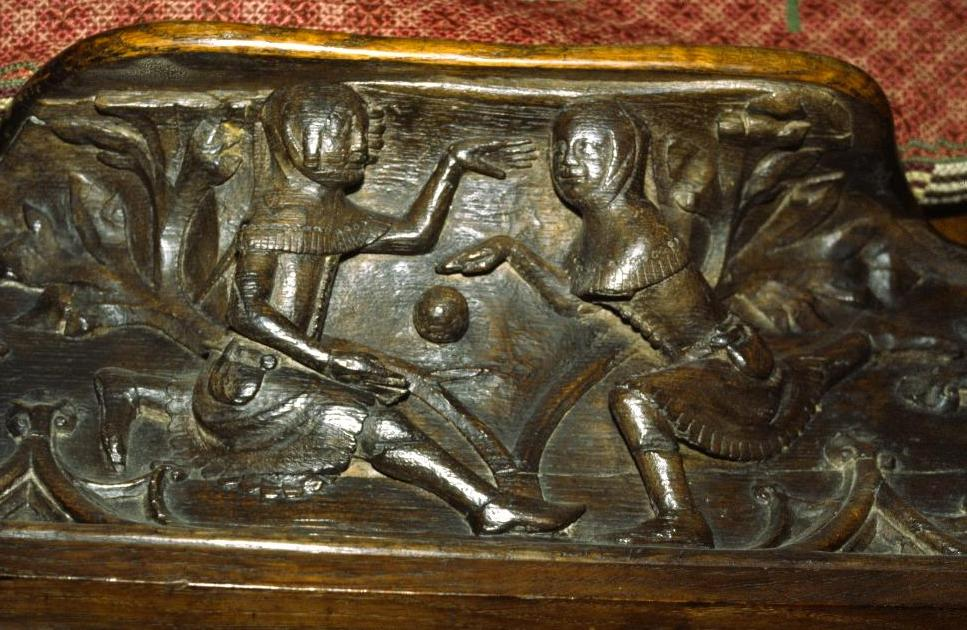
Wood carving of two youths playing ball on a misericord at Gloucester Cathedral, c. 1350.

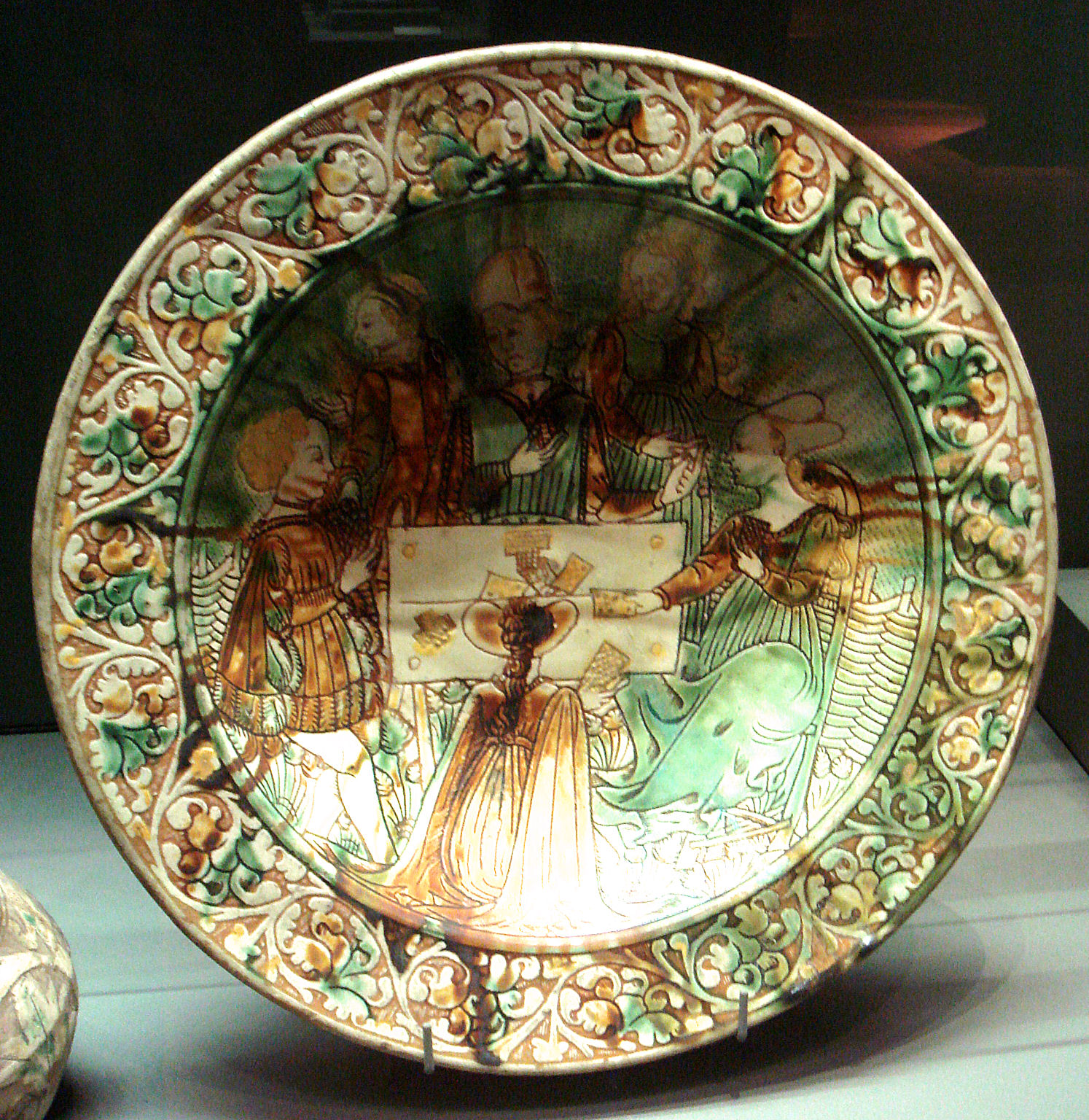
Italian Sancai Bowl depicting a card game, mid 15th century

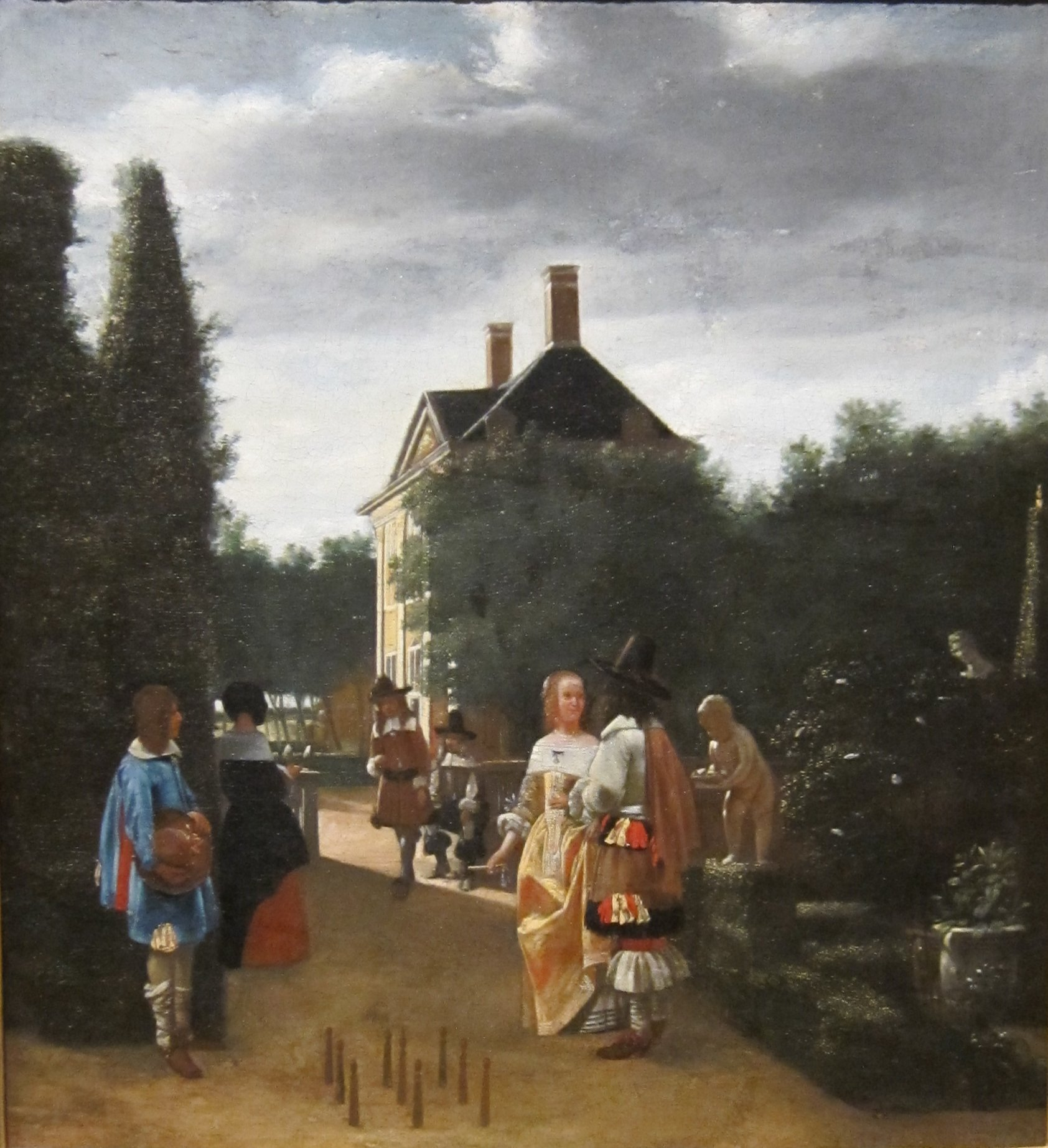
Game of Skittles, copy of 1660-1668 painting by Pieter de Hooch in the Saint Louis Art Museum

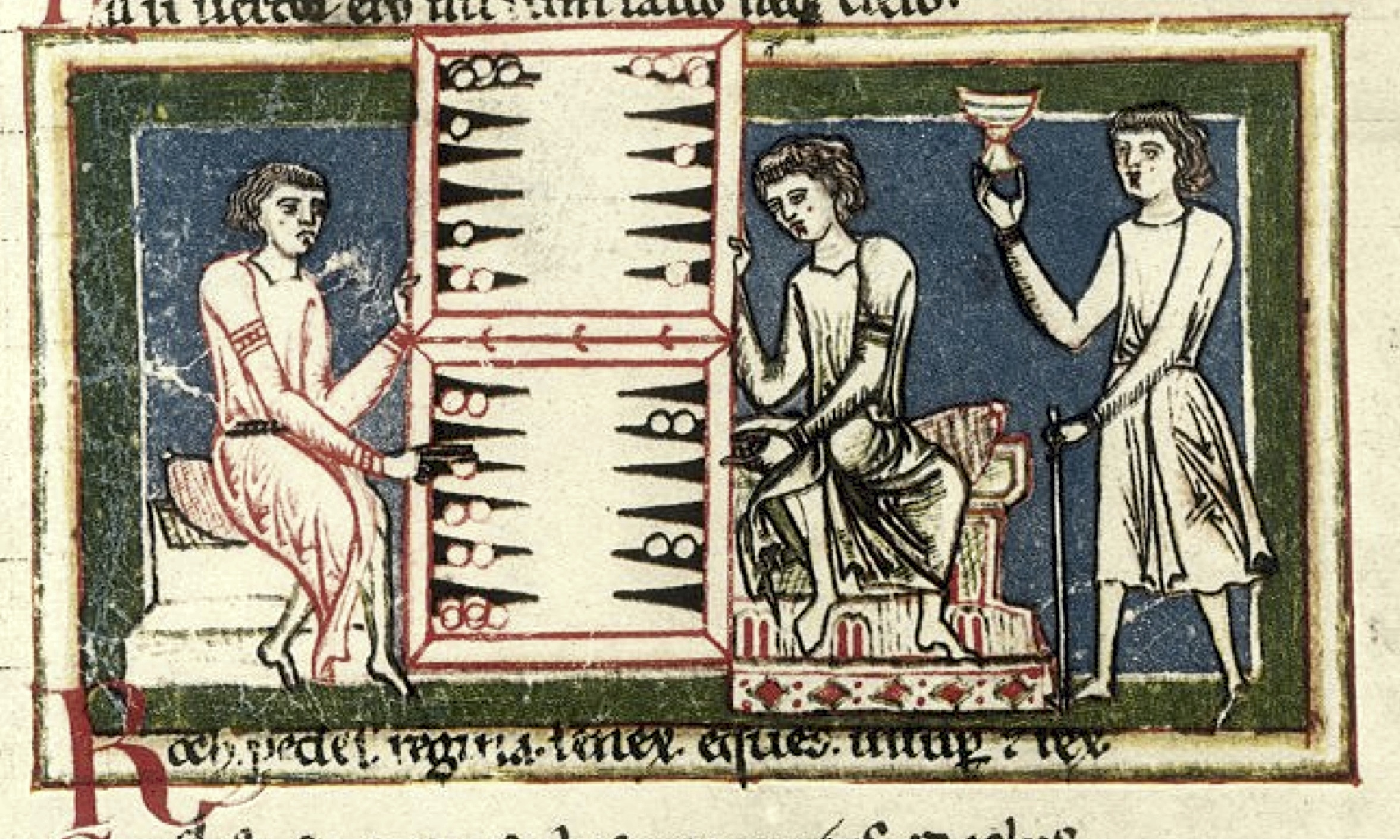
Medieval illustration of tabula players from the 13th century Carmina Burana.

== Modern games ==
=== Professional board games ===
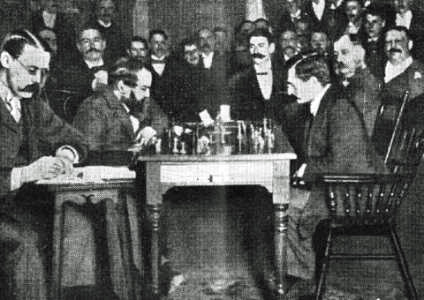
Emanuel Lasker (right) playing Steinitz for the World Chess Championship, New York 1894

Modern chess rules began taking shape in Spain and Italy during the 15th century with the adoption of the standard Queen and Bishop movements (initially called "Mad Queen chess"). Writings on chess theory also began to appear in the 15th century with the first text being the Repetición de Amores y Arte de Ajedrez (Repetition of Love and the Art of Playing Chess, 1497) by Spanish churchman Luis Ramirez de Lucena. Chess books by authors such as Ruy López de Segura and Gioachino Greco became widely studied. Chess was the favored game of Voltaire, Rousseau, Benjamin Franklin and Napoleon.

In 1851, the first international chess tournament was held in London and won by Adolf Anderssen. Soon after modern time control rules were adopted for competitive play. The first Official World Chess Championship was held in 1886 in the United States and won by Wilhelm Steinitz. By the 20th century, the game of Chess had developed into a professional sport with chess clubs, publications, player ratings and chess tournaments. The World Chess Federation (FIDE) was founded in 1924 in Paris.

A large number of Chess variants were also developed, with varying pieces, rules, boards and scoring. Among them are Kriegspiel, Capablanca Chess, Alice Chess, Circular chess, Three-dimensional chess, Hexagonal Chess, Chess with different armies, and Bobby Fischer's Chess960.

In Japan, Go and Shogi became the major board games played at a professional level. Both games were promoted in Japan by the Tokugawa shogunate in the 17th century, and top players (Meijin) received government endowments. During the 20th century the Japan Shogi Association and the Japan Go Association were founded and began organizing professional tournaments. During the Qing dynasty, many Xiangqi clubs were formed and books published. The Chinese Xiangqi Association was formed in 1962, and Xiangqi tournaments are held worldwide by national Xiangqi associations.

In 1997 the first Mind Sports Olympiad was held in London and included traditional as well as modern board games. Other board games such as Backgammon, Scrabble and Risk are also played professionally with dedicated world championships.

=== Commercial board games ===
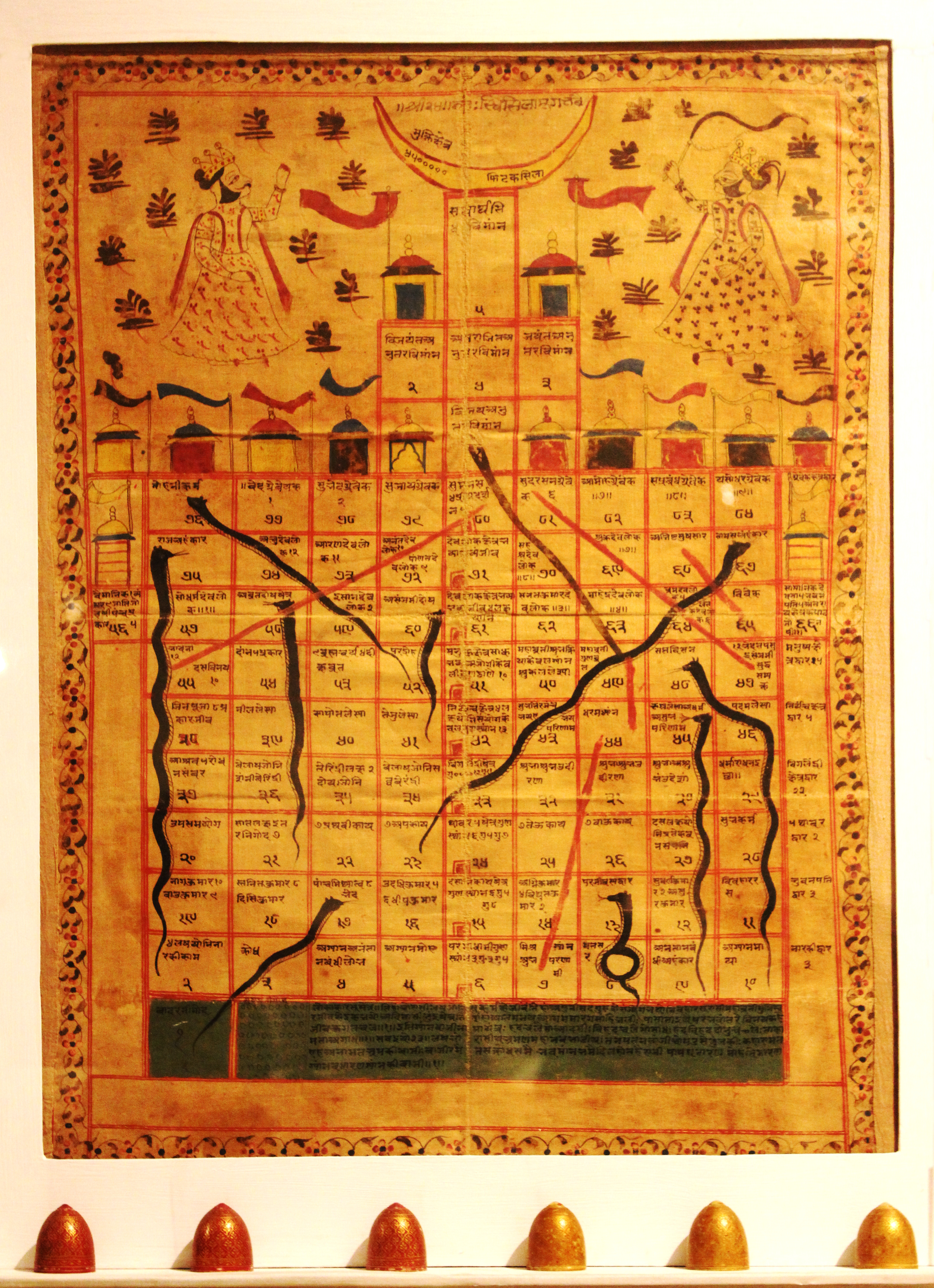
Gyan chauper, Late 18th century Jain game board on cloth in the decorative arts gallery of the National Museum of India. Acc. No. 85.312

The Ancient Indian game of Pachisi was brought to the west by the British in the 1863 and an adaptation of the oldest game named Parcheesi was first copyrighted in the United States by EG Selchow & Co in 1869. A version of the game called Ludo was patented in 1896. A similar German race game, Mensch ärgere dich nicht ("Man, don't get annoyed"), became immensely popular with German troops during World War I. Another Indian game which was adopted by the West was Gyan chauper (a.k.a. Moksha Patam), popularly known as snakes and ladders. This was a game which was intended to teach lessons about karma and good and bad actions, the ladders represented virtues and the snakes vices. The moral lesson of the game was that spiritual liberation, or Moksha could only be achieved through virtuous action, while vice led to endless reincarnation. The game dates to medieval India where it was played by Jains and Hindus. A Buddhist version, known as "ascending the [spiritual] levels" (Tibetan: sa gnon rnam bzhags) is played in Nepal and Tibet while a Muslim version of the game played during the Mughal period from the late 17th or early 18th centuries featured the 101 names of God. The game was first brought to Victorian England and it was published in the United States as Chutes and Ladders (an "improved new version of England's famous indoor sport") by game pioneer Milton Bradley in 1943.

The first board game for which the name of its designer is known is 'A Journey Through Europe or the Play of Geography', a map-based game published in 1759 by John Jefferys, a Geography and writing teacher. Designed in England by George Fox in 1800, The Mansion of Happiness became the prototype for commercial board games for at least two centuries to follow. The first board game published in the United States was Traveller's Tour Through the United States, published by New York City bookseller F. Lockwood in 1822. The earliest board games published in the United States were based upon Christian morality and included The Mansion of Happiness (1843) and The Game of Pope or Pagan, or The Siege of the Stronghold of Satan by the Christian Army (1844). While demonstrating the commercial viability of the ancient race game format, its moralistic overtones were countered by Milton Bradley in 1860 with the introduction of a radically different concept of success in The Checkered Game of Life, in which material successes came as a result of accomplishments such as attending college, marrying, and getting rich. Likewise the Game of the District Messenger Boy (1886) also focused on secular capitalist virtues rather than the religious.

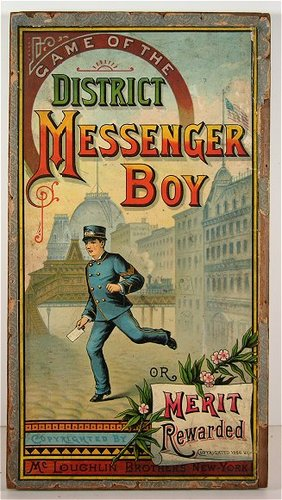
The Game of the District Messenger Boy (1886) encouraged the rags to riches idea that a lowly messenger boy could ascend the corporate ladder to become president

First patented in 1904, The Landlord's Game, designed by Lizzie Magie, was originally intended to illustrate the economic consequences of Ricardo's Law of Economic rent and the Georgist concept of a single tax on land value. A series of board games were developed from 1906 through the 1930s that involved the buying and selling of land and the development of that land. By 1933, a board game had been created much like the version of modern Monopoly by the Parker Brothers.

Though the first commercial version of the game of Battleship was Salvo, published in 1931 in the United States by the Starex company, the game itself dates to before World War I when it was played on paper by Russian officers. The French board game L'Attaque was first commercially released in 1910, having been designed two years prior as a military-themed imperfect knowledge game based upon the earlier Chinese children's board game dou shou qi. L'Attaque was subsequently adapted by the Chinese into Luzhanqi (or Lu Zhan Jun Qi), and by Milton Bradley into Stratego, the latter having been trademarked in 1960 while the former remains in the public domain. Jury Box, published in 1935, was the first murder mystery game which served as the basis for games like Cluedo.

Initially designed in 1938, Scrabble received its first mass-market exposure in 1952, two years prior to the release of Diplomacy, in 1954. Diplomacy was a game favored by John F. Kennedy, and Henry Kissinger. Originally released in 1957 as La Conquête du Monde ("The Conquest of the World") in France, Risk was first published under its English title in 1959.

Starting with Gettysburg in 1958, the company Avalon Hill developed particular board wargames covering specific historical themes such as Midway, D-Day and PanzerBlitz. Board wargames such as Squad Leader, Tactics and Europa developed extremely complex and realistic rules. Avalon Hill's Civilization introduced the use of the technology tree (or "tech tree"), variants of which have been implemented in numerous later board and video games such as Sid Meier's Civilization. Recent wargames such as 'A distant plain', 'Labyrinth' and the satirical War on Terror have focused on counterinsurgency and contemporary terrorism.

A concentrated design movement towards the German-style board game, or Eurogame, began in the late 1970s and early 1980s in Germany, and led to the development of board games such as Carcassonne, The Settlers of Catan, Agricola, Ticket to ride and Puerto Rico.

=== Card games ===
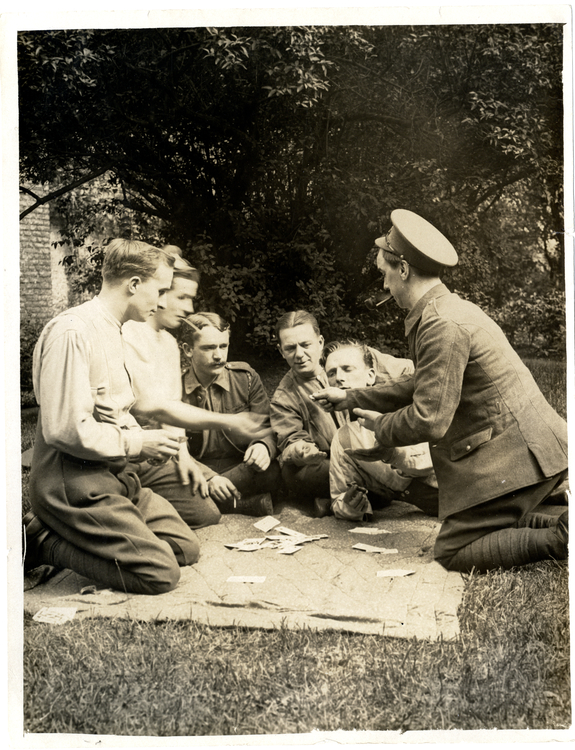
British soldiers playing cards in France, 1915

During the 15th century card suits began to approach the contemporary regional styles and the court cards evolved to represent European royalty. Early European card games included noddy, triomphe, all fours, piquet, basset, Hofamterspiel, Karnöffel, and primero. In 1674 Charles Cotton published his Compleat Gamester, one of the first books which set out to outline rules for many card and dice games. During the mid-16th century, Portuguese traders introduced playing cards to Japan. The first reference to twenty-one, the precursor of blackjack is found in a book by the Spanish author Miguel de Cervantes. Cervantes was a gambler, and the main characters of his tale Rinconete y Cortadillo are cheats proficient at playing ventiuna (twenty-one).

The game of cribbage appears to have developed in the early 17th century, as an adaptation of the earlier card game noddy. Pinochle was likely derived from the earlier bezique, a game popular in France during the 17th century. 1742 saw the publication of Edmund Hoyle's Short Treatise on the Game of Whist which became one of the bestselling publications of the 18th century. Whist was widely played during the 18th and 19th centuries, having evolved from the 16th century game of trump (or ruff) by way of Ruff and Honours.

Baccarat first came to the attention of the public at large and grew to be widely played as a direct result of the Royal Baccarat Scandal of 1891, and bears resemblances to the card games Faro and Basset, both of which were very popular during the 19th century. The rules of Contract bridge were originally published in 1925, the game having been derived from Bridge games with rules published as early as 1886, Bridge games, in turn, having evolved from the earlier game of Whist.

The first documented game of poker dates from an 1833 Mississippi river steamer. During the American Civil War the game was popular with soldiers and additions were made including stud poker, and the straight. Modern tournament play became popular in American casinos after the World Series of Poker (WSOP) began, in 1970. Poker's popularity experienced an unprecedented spike at the beginning of the 21st century, largely because of the introduction of online poker and hole-card cameras, which turned the game into a spectator sport. In 2009 the International Federation of Poker was founded in Lausanne, Switzerland, becoming the official governing body for poker.

Collectible card games or trading card games while bearing similarities to earlier games in concept, first achieved wide popularity in the 1990s. The first trading card game was The Base Ball Card Game produced by The Allegheny Card Co. and registered on 4 April 1904. It featured 104 unique baseball cards with individual player attributes printed on the cards enabling each collector to build a team and play the game against another person. The 1990s saw the rise of games such as Magic: The Gathering and the Pokémon Trading Card Game.

=== Miniature wargaming ===
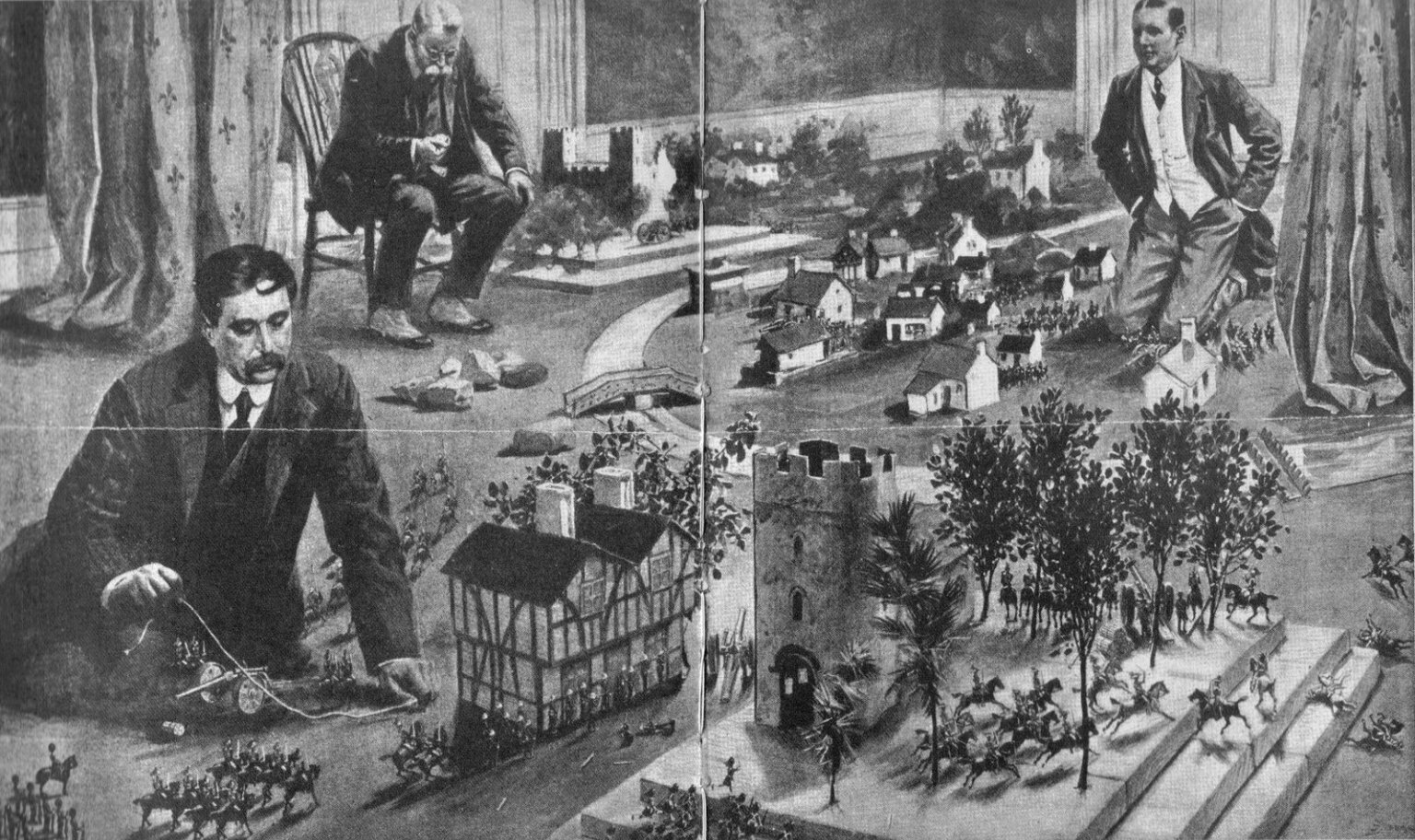
H. G. Wells playing Little Wars

Miniature figure games have their origin in a German chess variant called 'The King's Game', created in 1780 by Helwig, Master of Pages to the Duke of Brunswick. It had a board with 1,666 squares of varying types of terrain, with pieces representing modern military units. In the early 19th century, the Prussian army developed war games or 'kriegspieler', with staff officers moving pieces around on a game table, using dice rolls to indicate chance or "friction" and with an umpire scoring the results. After the stunning Prussian victories against Austria and France in the 19th century, the Austrians, French, British, Italians, Japanese and Russians all began to make use of wargaming as a training tool. By 1889 wargaming was firmly embedded in the culture of the U.S. Navy.

The first non-military wargame rules were developed by Naval enthusiast and analyst Fred T. Jane in 1898. H. G. Wells published rules in his Floor Games (1911) and Little Wars (1913) designed for wargaming with toy soldiers. In 1956, Jack Scruby, known as the "Father of Modern Miniature Wargaming" organized the first miniatures convention and he was also a manufacturer of military miniatures and editor of a wargaming newsletter. Miniature war games became affordable and mainstream in the late 1950s with the rise of cheaper miniature production methods by miniature figure manufacturers such as Scruby Miniatures, Miniature Figurines and Hinchliffe. During the 1980s there was a boom in miniature wargaming with the development of games such as Warhammer Fantasy Battle and Warhammer 40,000. Today miniature wargaming includes most historical eras, fantasy and science fiction settings as well as Naval wargaming (Don't Give Up the Ship!, General Quarters), Air wargaming and Space combat wargames (Full Thrust, Attack Vector: Tactical).

=== Role playing games ===
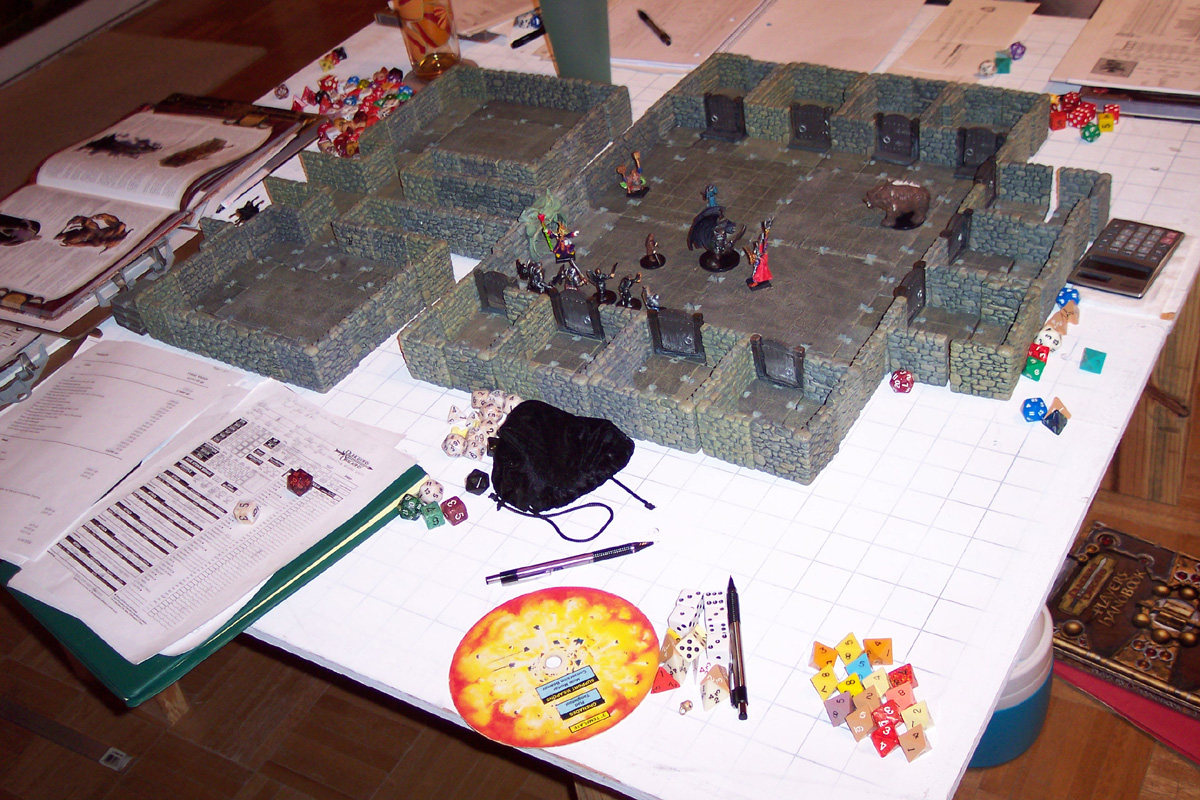
Dungeons & Dragons game in progress

Early role-playing games such as those made by M. A. R. Barker and Greg Stafford developed from miniature figure wargames. Gary Gygax of the University of Minnesota's wargaming society developed a set of rules for a late medieval milieu. This game was called Chainmail and was a historical game, but later editions included an appendix for adding fantasy elements such as spells, wizards and dragons. By 1971, Dave Arneson had developed a miniatures game called Blackmoor which contained elements that would become widespread in fantasy gaming: hit points, experience points, character levels, armor class, and dungeon crawls. Arneson and Gygax then met and collaborated on the first Dungeons & Dragons game which was released in 1974 by Gygax's TSR. The game was very successful and several other games such as the Science fiction RPG Traveller and the generic GURPS system followed in imitation. In the late 1970s TSR launched Advanced Dungeons & Dragons (AD&D) which saw an expansion of rulebooks and additions. The 1980s saw several Dungeons & Dragons controversies such as the claims that the game promoted Satanism and witchcraft. Traditional Roleplaying games were the basis for the modern Role-playing video game.

=== Other indoor games ===
In colonial America, the game of hazard was called crapaud by the French in New Orleans (a French word meaning "toad" in reference to the original style of play by people crouched over a floor or sidewalk). This was later shortened to craps and after several adaptations became the most popular gambling dice game in the United States. Sic bo was introduced into the United States by Chinese immigrants in the 20th century and is now a popular casino game. Another casino game, roulette, has been played since the late 18th century, and was probably adapted from English wheel games such as Roly-Poly and E.O.

With the possible exception of carrom (a game whose origins are uncertain), the earliest table games appear to have been the cue sports, which include carom billiards, pool, or pocket billiards, and snooker. The cue sports are generally regarded as having developed into indoor games from outdoor stick-and-ball lawn games (retroactively termed ground billiards), and as such to be related to trucco, croquet and golf, and more distantly to the stickless bocce and bowls.

Dominoes, which originate in China and date as far back as the Song dynasty (A.D. 1120), first appeared in Europe during the 18th century. The Chinese tile game mahjong developed from a Chinese card game known as mǎdiào sometime during the 17th century and was imported into the United States in the 1920s.

=== Outdoor games ===
Modern sports developed from different European games, many of them played by European royalty. Tennis developed in France, French kings like Francis I of France (1515–1547) and Henry II (1547–1559) were well known players. Golf originated in Scotland, where the first written record of golf is James II's banning of the game in 1457. The ban was lifted by James IV in 1502 who also played golf. Cricket can be traced back to Tudor times in early 16th-century England and the modern rules of association football and rugby football are based on mid-19th century rules made to standardise the football games played by English public schools. These team sports were spread worldwide by the influence of the British Empire.

=== Electronic games ===
The earliest reference to a purely electronic game appears to be a United States patent registration in 1947 for what was described by its inventors as a "cathode-ray tube amusement device". Through the 1950s and 1960s the majority of early computer games ran on university mainframe computers in the United States. Beginning in 1971, video arcade games began to be offered to the public for play. The first home video game console, the Magnavox Odyssey, was released in 1972.

The golden age of arcade video games began in 1978 and continued through to the mid-1980s. A second generation of video game consoles, released between 1977 and 1983, saw increased popularity as a result of this, though this eventually came to an abrupt end with the video game crash of 1983. The home video game industry was eventually revitalized with the third generation of game consoles over the next few years, which saw a shift in the dominance of the video game industry from the United States to Japan. This same time period saw the advent of the personal computer game, specialized gaming home computers, early online gaming, and the introduction of LED handheld electronic games and eventually handheld video games.
