= Gyan chauper =

Traditional board game from India

Gyan Chauper
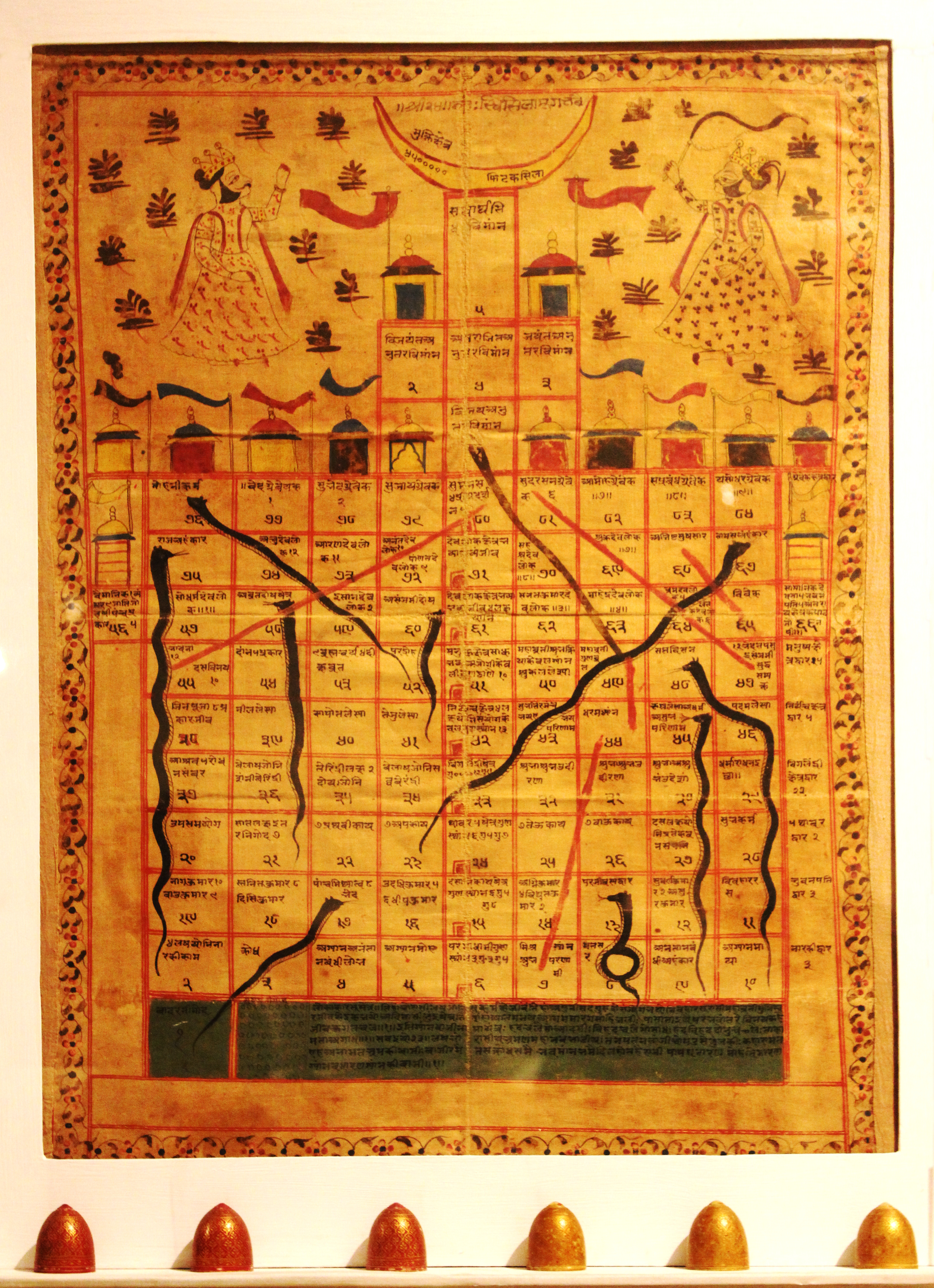
- Jain Gyan Chaupar on cloth, National Museum (India, 19th century)
- Other names: Snakes and Ladders; Chutes and Ladders
- Genres: Board game Race game Dice game
- Players: Minimum 2
- Skills: entirely based upon probability

Gyan Chauper (ज्ञान चौपड़ in Hindi sometimes spelt gyan chaupar) is a dice game derived from chaupar, a board game played in ancient India, popularly known as Snakes and ladders. It was from India that it spread to the rest of the world. It was a very popular game that was played not only for entertainment but also as a way to instruct on morality. The central concept of the game is the liberation from bondage of passions. So the players move from the lower levels of consciousness to higher levels of spiritual enlightenment and finally to Moksha.

== Board geometry ==
The Gyan Chauper board is in a grid pattern. The Hindu Gyan Chauper has numerous formats whereas the Jain Gyan Chaupers are standardized with 84 numbered squares in a 9x9 pattern. The board game is in the human shape-the universal being. The topmost part of the board is the heavenly abode or the Moksha dwar akin to the head of the cosmic being. A protruding square on the extreme bottom left and one square on each side of the board is indicative of its legs and arms. Even the way the snakes and ladders have been placed on the board does not change whereas they vary widely in Hindu, Muslim, and Buddhist Gyan Chaupers.

== History ==
Dice games have been played in India since Shramanic times, though game boards and pieces have been found in the Indus Valley Civilisation. Ivory and bone objects of all shapes and sizes, some with dots on them, and interpreted as "dice" and/or "gaming pieces", have been found at Mohenjo-daro, Harappa, Lothal, Kalibangan, Alamgirpur, and so on. Fragments of game boards have also been found at various sites. A potsherd with a chaupar design drawn on it has been discovered at Nagarjunakonda. A recent excavation from Rakhigarhi in Haryana discovered game boards and game pieces in terracotta and stone. Many pyramid-shaped game pieces made in stone, ivory and terracotta have been discovered at these ancient sites.

Dice playing is also mentioned in a hymn in the Rig Veda, which expresses the lament of the player over his loss of wealth and spouse. The Vedic people used Vibhidaka (small brown nuts) as dice. This tradition of ritualistic gambling is still seen today as Hindus play the modern version of this game during Diwali.

The Mahabharata also mentions the game of dice in which Yudhishthira loses everything to his cousins. The Skanda Purana mentions Shiva and Parvati playing a game of dice. This scene has been beautifully shown in a sculpture in the Ellora Caves in Aurangabad.

The Jain gyan chauper is mentioned in the Dhanapala, a 10th-century text from Rishabhapanchashika. It was mostly played on painted cloth called patas.

Gyan Chauper reached England around the 1890s. In the beginning, the game was also moralistic like the Indian version, but later due to the slowdown of the European economy in the 1940s due to the wars only numerical plan game boards were made. This design since then has remained ubiquitous.

== Gameplay ==
Gyan chauper influenced the creation of morality games such as "Virtue Rewarded and Vice Punished" (1918) which evolved during the British Raj into the English game of Snakes and Ladders. It is played with the same rules except here the idea behind it is how an individual's karma effects his spiritual journey. Therefore, each player the jiva progresses upwards overcoming hurdles in the form of snakes representing vices.

Each player starts from the bottom Narak Dwar and takes turns to roll dice and moves forward according to the number generated, towards Swarg (heaven) & ultimately reaching their goal of uniting with the Supreme One, seen as a crescent shape right on top.

== Specific versions ==
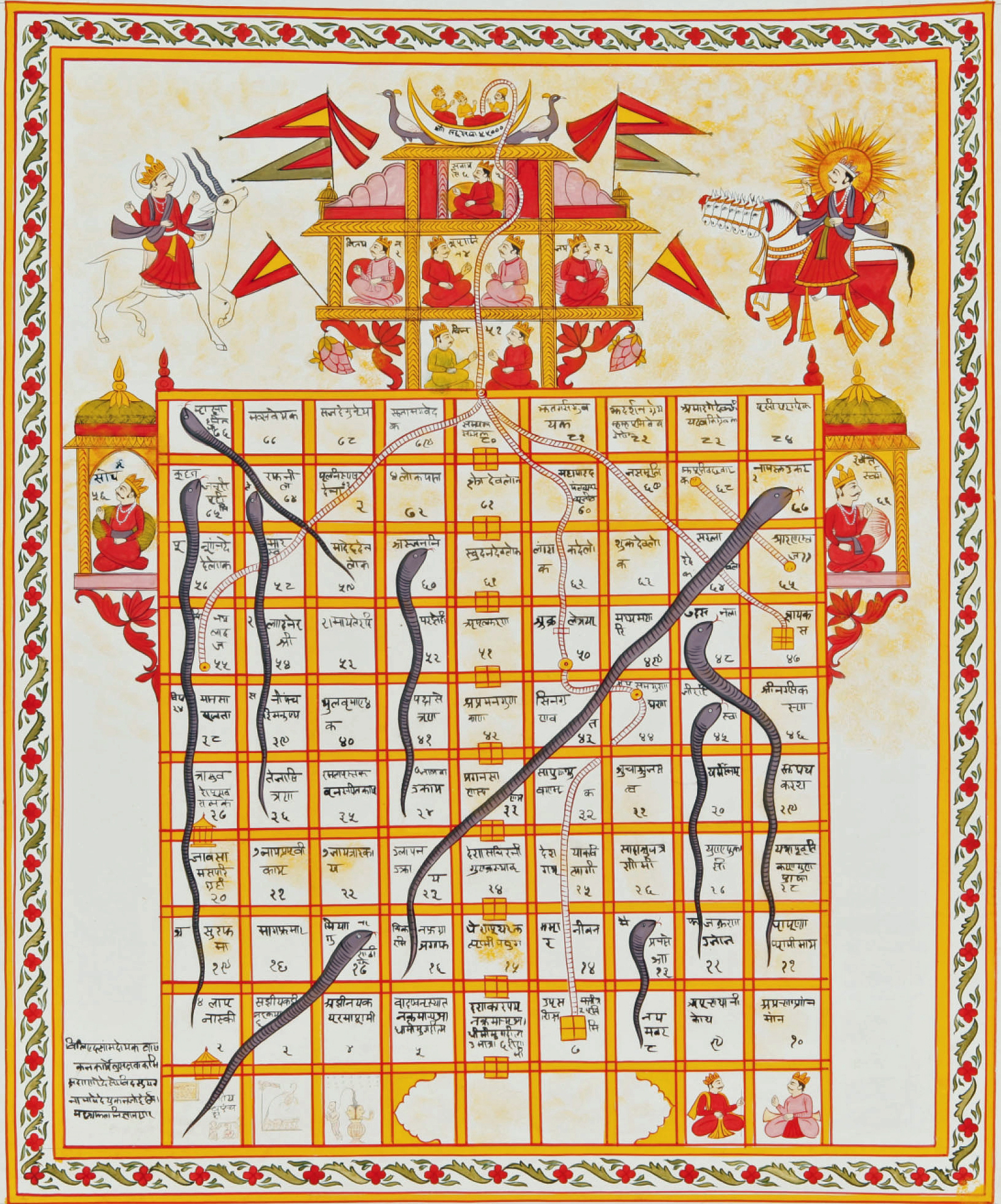

The Hindu version of the Gyan Chauper was more popular with the Brahmins. Traditional Hindu gyan chaupars boards have greater diversity in terms of the format than those of Jains. These formats are supposed to have developed over a period of time. The terminologies included on the board are Sankhya, Yoga, Vedanta, all underlining devotionalism. Vaikuntha (the heaven of Vishnu) being the winning square in most of the Hindu boards point to the fact that these boards were mostly Vaishnava in inspiration. Some of the Hindu boards following the 9×8 pattern, i.e., 72 squares in all, are found in Nepal as well where it is referred to as nagapasa or snake-dice. Surprisingly, both Persian and Devanagari script have been used in the squares. In one of the board games of early 19th-century from Marwar, Vishnu is shown in the form of Krishna. There is also a unique example of a 124-square board from Maharashtra. Another notable feature of this board is the unusual 14×10 grid, the whole playing area being divided into four separate zones.

The Muslim version was used in the Mughal period from the late 17th or early 18th century. It is 100 square gyan chauper which represents the number of names of god or 101, if the throne of Allah is counted. It is written in Arabic or Persian. There are 17 ladders and 13 snakes. It shows direct ladders from fana fi Allah to the throne. Later with slight modifications, it is known as "Shatranj-al-Arifin" or "The chess of gnostics.

The Gyan Chauper exhibited at the National Museum, New Delhi is the Jain version with 84 squares.

== Modern Uses ==
The game has also been adapted for play on a phone application.
