= Ssangnyuk =

Korean board game

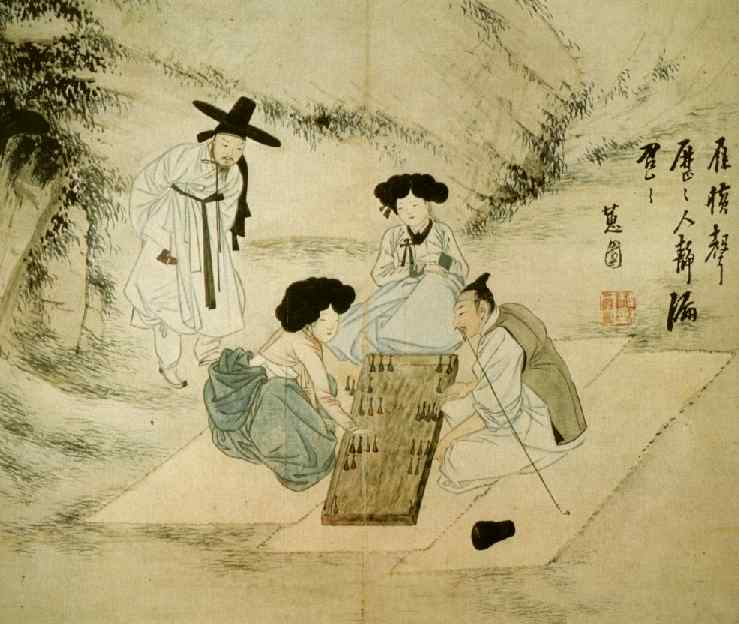
Players and observers alike absorbed in a ssangnyuk game during the Joseon period

Ssangnyuk (Korean: 쌍륙; Hanja: 雙六) is a traditional Korean board game.

== Introduction ==
Ssangnyuk (or ssangyuk) is a game for two players using dice; it is most commonly played in winter. It has a game board, 30 horses and 2 dice. It is also called ssangnyuk (same spelling and sound but different Hanja: 雙陸), aksak (악삭; 握槊), sangnyuk (상륙; 象陸), and sangnyuk (상육; 象陸).

The game is similar in structure and play to those of the tables family of games, a genre that includes backgammon.

== Contents ==
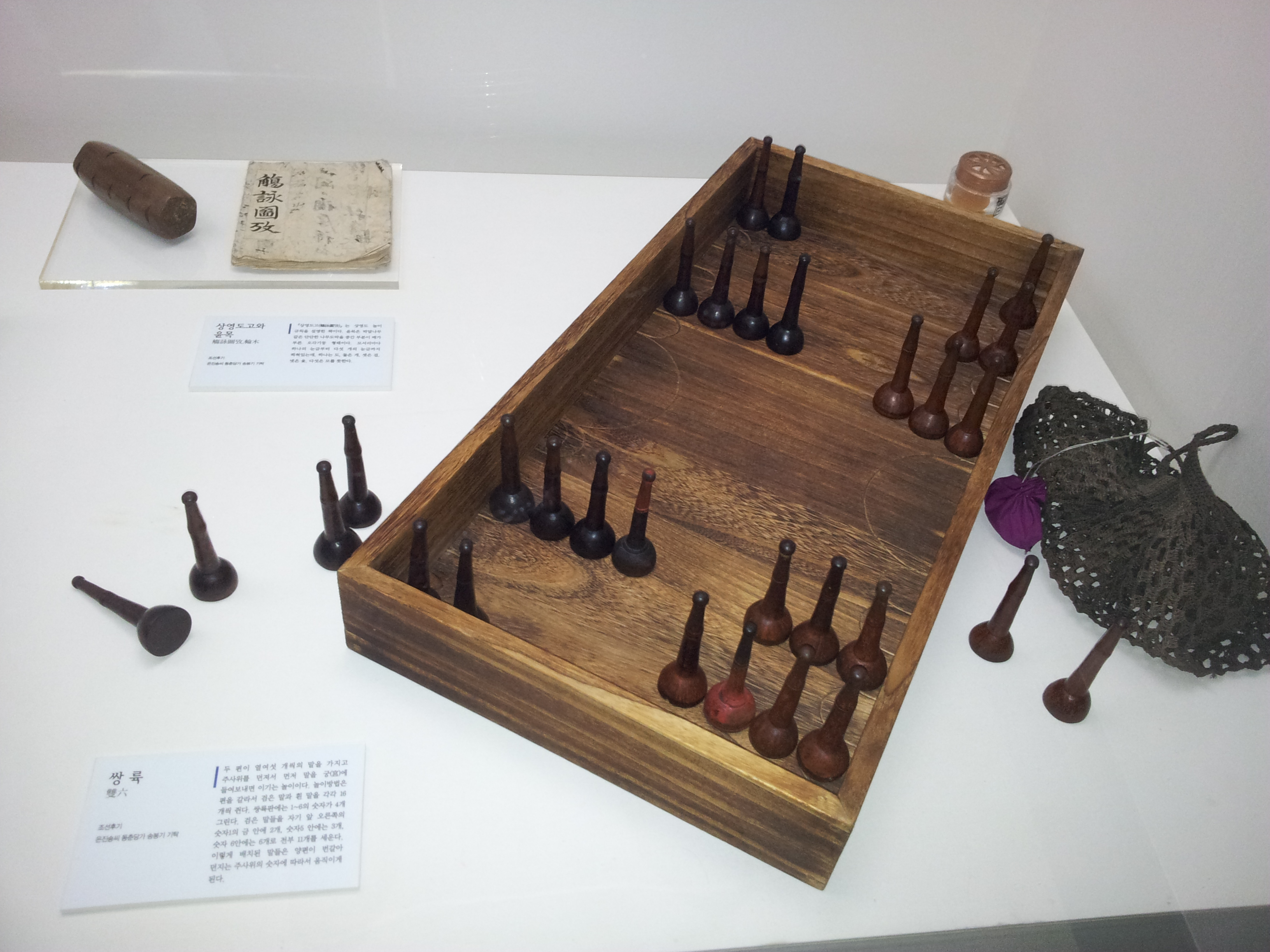
Game board and pieces from late Choseon Dynasty

The game board doesn't have any required size, but on average it is 80 cm (31 in) long and 40 cm (16 in) wide. A die is about 1 cm³ and is made from ivory or bone. Tiger bone is preferred.

Movement is similar to backgammon according to the throw of the dice; typically two pieces are moved when doubles are thrown, and doubles do not entitle the player to another turn.

== See also ==
- Backgammon
- ban-sugoroku (盤双六) (a Japanese variant of backgammon)
