= Long dice =

Type of dice

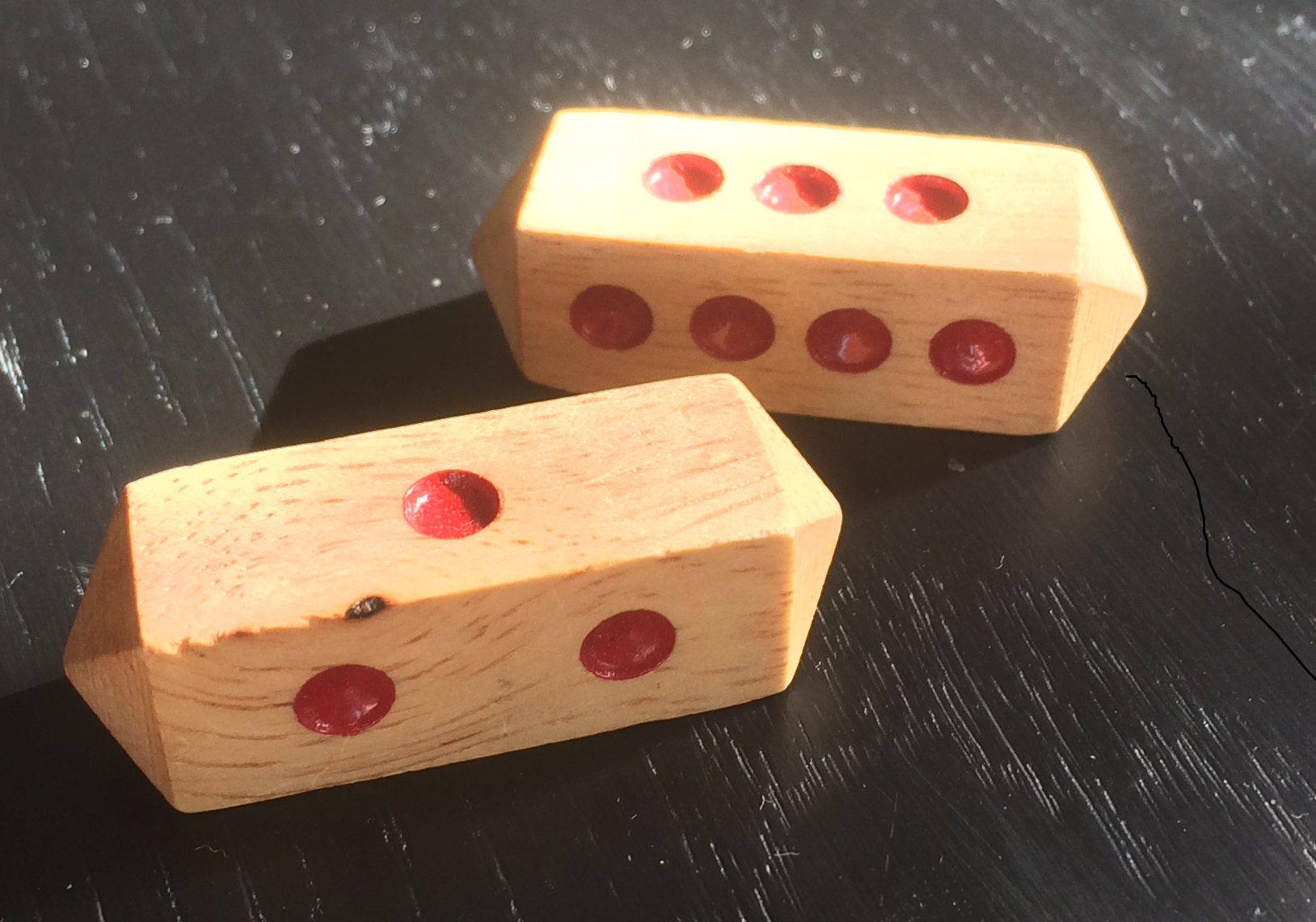
A pair of four-sided long dice

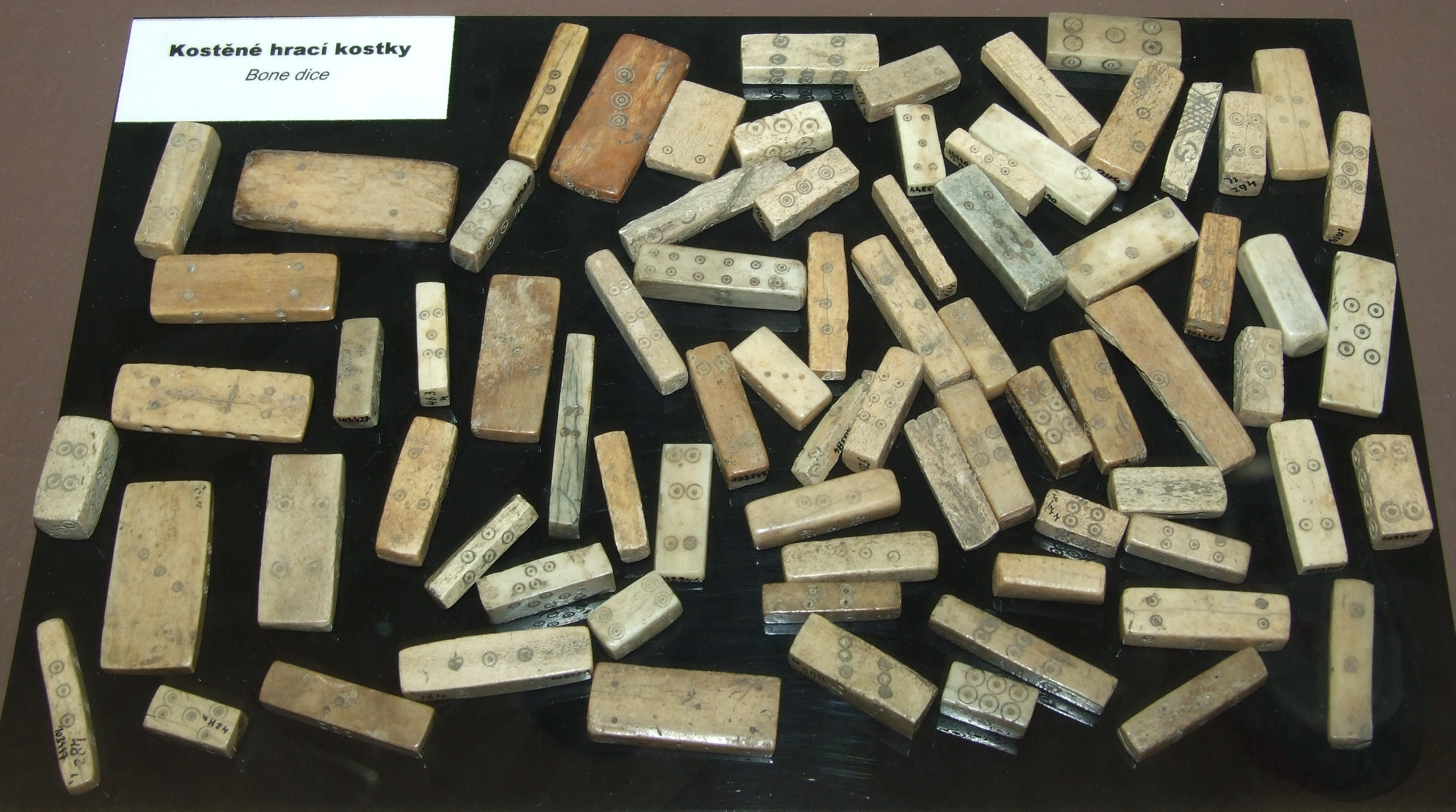
A collection of ancient long dice, mostly four-faced, from Bohemia, Moravia, and Slovakia

Long dice (sometimes oblong or stick dice) are dice, often roughly right prisms or (in the case of barrel dice) antiprisms, designed to land on any of several marked lateral faces, but neither end. Landing on end may be rendered very rare simply by their small size relative to the faces, by the instability implicit in the height of the dice, and by rolling the long dice along their axes rather than tossing. Many long dice provide further insurance against landing on end by giving the ends a rounded or peaked shape, rendering such an outcome physically impossible (at least on a flat solid surface).

Design advantages of long dice include being relatively easy to create fair dice with an odd number of faces, and (for four-faced dice) being easier to roll than tetrahedral d4 dice (as found in many role-playing games).

== Four faces (square prisms) ==
A four-faced Daldøs die, "unrolled" at right to show one of its standard configurations.

Both cubic dice and four-faced long dice are found as early as the mid third millennium BCE at Indus Valley Civilisation sites; these are marked variously with dot-and-ring figures, linear devices, and Indus Valley signs. Dot-and-ring figures are used to this day on long dice in India, and predominate in the central European long dice shown above. In India, long dice (pasa) are used to play Chaupar (a relative of Pachisi); the faces may be marked with the values 1-3-4-6 or 1-2-5-6, though older Indian long dice were marked 1-2-3-4.

Similar dice were used by Germanic people before the Migration Period. These include distinctive roughly ovoid Westerwanna dice (named for the site of their initial discovery in Lower Saxony); these are typically about 2 cm in length and marked with dot-and-ring figures of values 2-3-4-5.

Long dice are used with the Scandinavian games Daldøs (typically marked A-II-III-IIII or X-II-III-IIII) and Sáhkku (with a variety of similar markings including X-II-III-[blank]); these dice may be so short as to exhibit nearly square faces, and therefore feature pyramidal ends.

== More faces (n-gonal prisms) ==
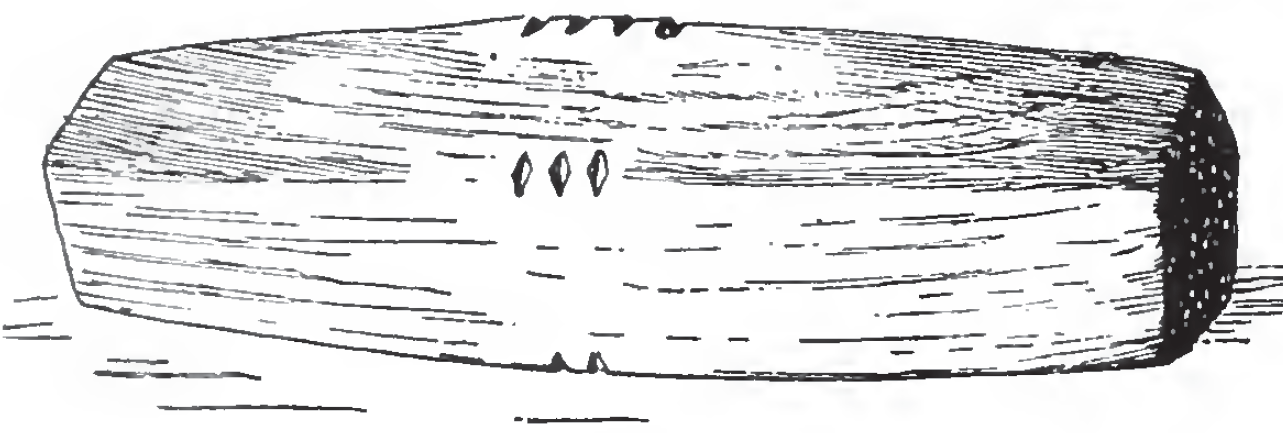
Five-faced long die for the Korean Game of Dignitaries; notches indicating values are cut into the edges, since in an odd-faced long die these land uppermost.

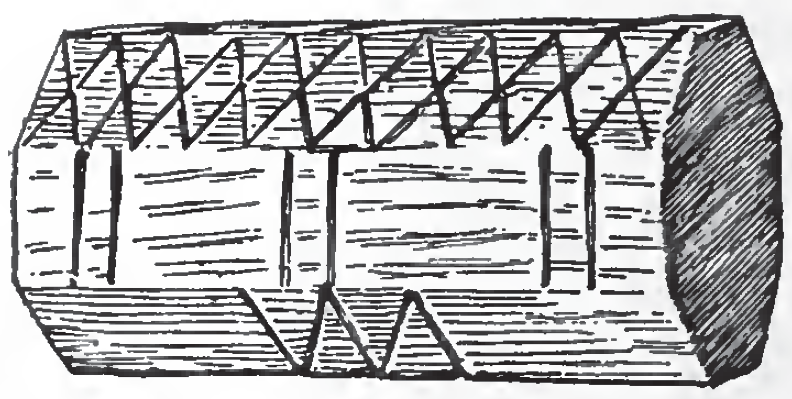
Lang Larence ("Long Lawrence"), a traditional English long die

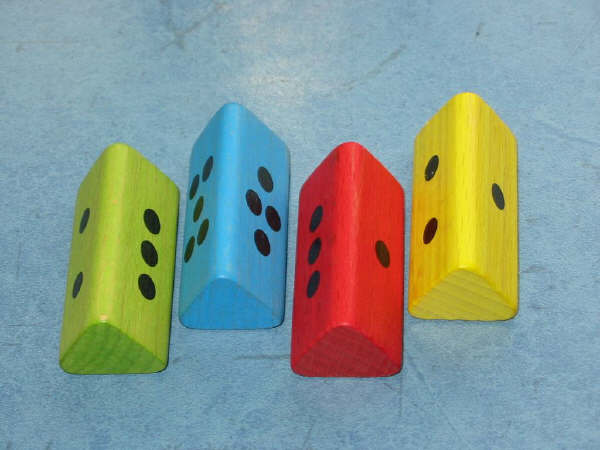
Modern three-sided long dice

A five-faced long die (pentagonal prism) is used in the Korean game of Dignitaries.

Owzthat and similar forms of pencil cricket (a cricket simulation game) use two six-faced long dice (hexagonal prisms—like segments of a pencil).

Though the traditional English Lang Larence ("Long Lawrence") was sometimes four-faced, it commonly appeared with eight faces (octagonal prism), even though they continued to display only four distinct values (each value being displayed on two faces).

Faces of the Lang Larence
Marking	Name	Result
XXXXXXXXXX	"Flush"	Take all counters from the pool
| | | | | |	"Put doan two"	Put 2 counters into the pool
\/\/\	"Lave all"	Neither take nor put
| | |	"Sam up one"	Take 1 counter from the pool

This gambling game played with the Lang Larence is the same as that usually played with teetotums. A teetotum is essentially a long die (though not necessarily physically long) with a spindle through its axis, allowing it to be spun and preventing it landing on end. Though many teetotums (for example, the dreidel) are four-faced, they may have any practical number of faces.

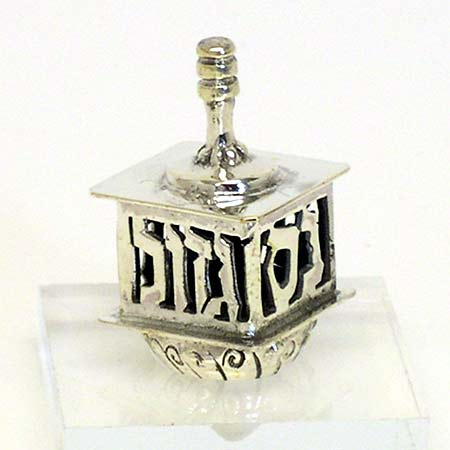
Four-faced dreidel

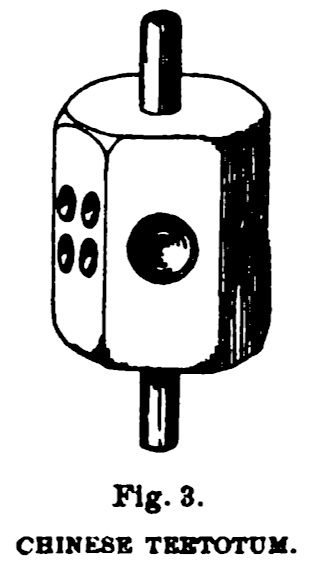
Six-faced Chinese teetotum

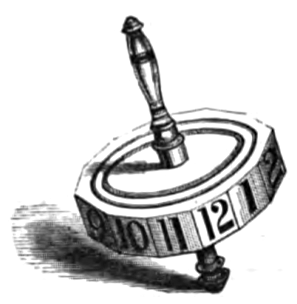
Twelve-faced teetotum

== Barrel dice ==
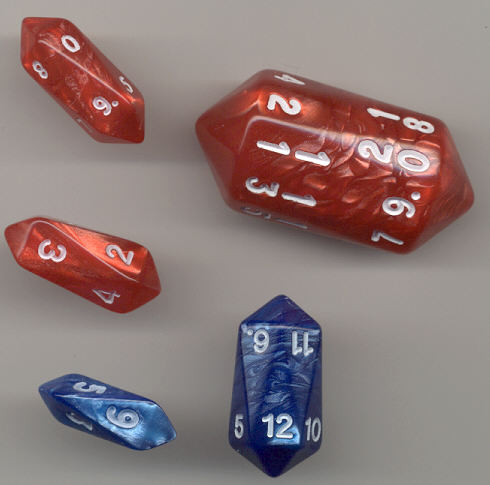
Barrel dice

Barrel dice are a more recent design, used most often by players of role playing games and wargames. They appear roughly cylindrical, and are generally modified antiprisms with between four and twenty flattened triangular facets, each numbered. Each triangular face alternates in alignment by 180 degrees. The two ends are formed by half as many triangular facets as there are numbered faces, arranged as a pyramid so that it is impossible for the die to stop on one of its ends.

== See also ==
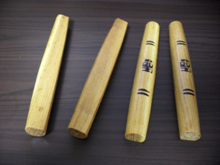
Binary lots used for Yunnori

- Binary lot
- Some games featuring long half-round 2-sided lots (sometimes also called "stick dice", or alternatively, "throwing staves/rods/sticks"):
  - Liubo
  - Senet
  - Tâb
  - Yunnori
  - Zohn Ahl

== Bibliography ==
- Bell, R. C. (1960), Board and Table Games [1] (rev. 1969 and rpt. with vol 2 as Board and Table Games from Many Civilizations Mineola, NY: Dover, 1979 ed.), London: Oxford University Press, ISBN 0-486-23855-5
- Borvo, Alan (2001), "Sáhkku, The "Devil's Game"" (PDF), Board Games Studies, vol. 4, Leiden: CNWS Publications, pp. 33–52, ISBN 90-5789-075-5, ISSN 1566-1962
- Culin, Stewart (1898), Chess and Playing-Cards (rpt. New York: Arno Press, 1976 ed.), Washington DC: US National Museum, ISBN 0-405-07916-8
- Finkel, Irving (2004), "Dice in India and Beyond", in Mackenzie, Colin; Finkel, Irving (eds.), Asian Games: The Art of Contest, Asia Society, pp. 38–45, ISBN 0-87848-099-4
- Gomme, Alice (1894), The Traditional Games of England, Scotland, and Ireland, vol. 1, London: David Nutt
- van der Heijdt, Leo (2002), Face to Face with Dice: 5000 Years of Dice and Dicing, Groningen, NL: Gopher Publishers, ISBN 90-76953-88-0
- Michaelsen, Peter (2001), "Daldøs, an almost forgotten dice board game" (PDF), Board Games Studies, vol. 4, Leiden: CNWS Publications, pp. 19–31, ISBN 90-5789-075-5, ISSN 1566-1962
- Murray, H. J. R. (1951), A History of Board-Games Other Than Chess (rpt. Oxford: Oxbow Books, 2002 ed.), Oxford: Oxford University Press, ISBN 0-19-827401-7
- Østergaard, Eric; Gaston, Anne (2001), "Daldøs — the rules" (PDF), Board Games Studies, vol. 4, Leiden: CNWS Publications, pp. 15–17, ISBN 90-5789-075-5, ISSN 1566-1962
- Parlett, David (1999), The Oxford History of Board Games, Oxford: Oxford University Press, ISBN 0-19-212998-8
