= Westerwanna dice =

Archaeological artifact

Westerwanna dice are a distinctive style of four-sided dice found in archaeological sites in Northwestern Europe. The term "Westerwanna" for this style was introduced in 1982, named after the town Westerwanna, or type-site, in Lower Saxony in northwestern Germany. A number of these objects were found during archaeological investigations in Westerwanna, which are currently curated at the Historisches Museum Bremerhaven. Similar bone dice specimens have been documented in broad regional regional surveys of Germanic settlements along the North Sea coast, including at the landmark settlement excavation of Feddersen Wierde.

== Shape ==
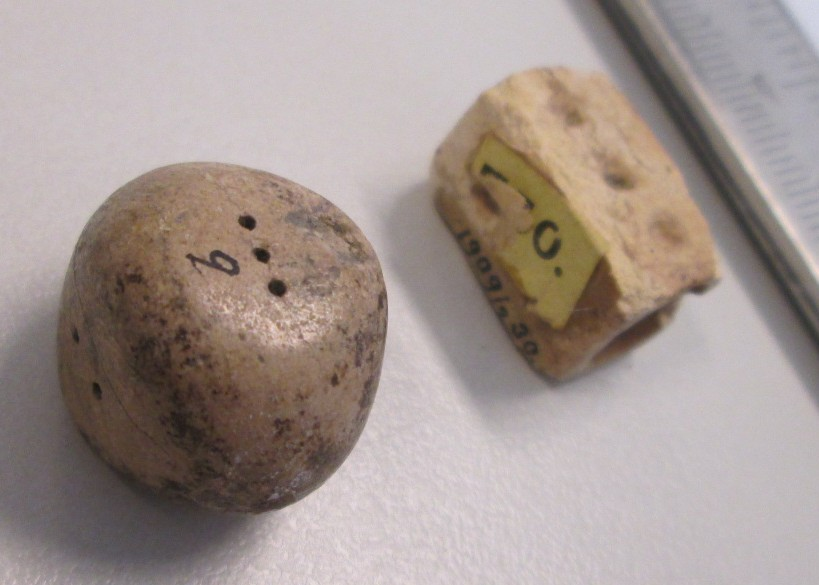
Solid style of Westerwanna Die (left) next to an Oblong Die (right). The Westerwanna die is from the site of Toornwerd, Loppersum, in the province Groningen, Netherlands. The 3 pip is facing up. Both items curated at the Noordelijk Archeologisch Depot in Nuis, Netherlands.

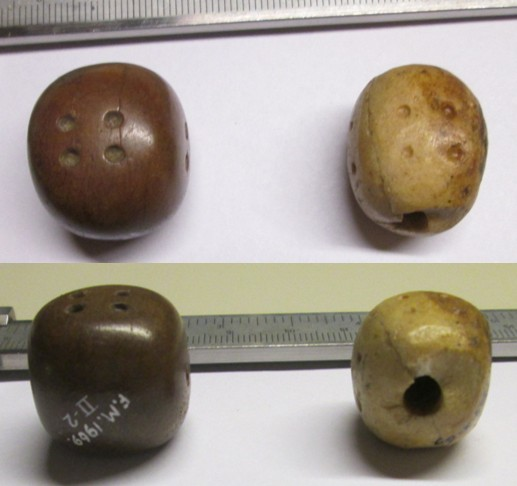
Solid Westerwanna die (left) from Grou, Friesland, next to Hollow Westerwanna die (right) from Waaxens, Friesland, with a medullary cavity. Both items curated at the Fries Museum in Leeuwarden, Netherlands.

Westerwanna dice are symmetrical spherical to slightly ovoid in shape, and typically made from animal long bone. Most Westerwanna dice are made from a solid piece of cortical bone, while a smaller subset have a hollow interior from the medullary cavity of the long bone. The Westerwanna die is not elongated as most other four-sided long dice are (also known as "oblong" or "stick" dice), but has two opposite ends that are rounded, creating a more spherical or ovular overall form. Four flattened faces, in pairs opposite one another, contain the numbers or pips. When rolled, the die is only able to settle on one of the four faces.

Westerwanna dice lack the 1 and 6, but retain the numbers 2, 3, 4, and 5. Dice are in the "Sevens" configuration, where the 2 and 5, and the 3 and 4, appear on opposite sides of the object, thereby adding to seven. Such a configuration is typical of Roman six-sided cubic dice. Pips are usually in the "dot" style, with a craters or punctate holes representing counts, though some pips show a dot surrounded by a single ring.

== Historical significance ==
Westerwanna dice were made by the Frisii people in the northern Netherlands and Germany during the late Iron Age and Imperial Roman period. The Frisii were a Germanic tribe, living just north of the Limes Germanicus, the northern edge of the Roman Empire. Although some interactions between Romans and Frisii were violent, for example, with Frisii attacking Roman forts along the Limes, exchange of cultural information and technology also occurred across this cultural boundary.

Statistical and spatial analyses of North Sea find-spots indicate that the style represents a structural hybridization, blending the "Sevens" numeric configuration of Roman six-sided cubic dice with the physical form of and Celtic or Free Germania oblong four-sided dice from the west, north, or east.

It is unknown what types of games were played with these dice.
