= Chocolate coin =

Gold foil covered chocolates in the shape of coins

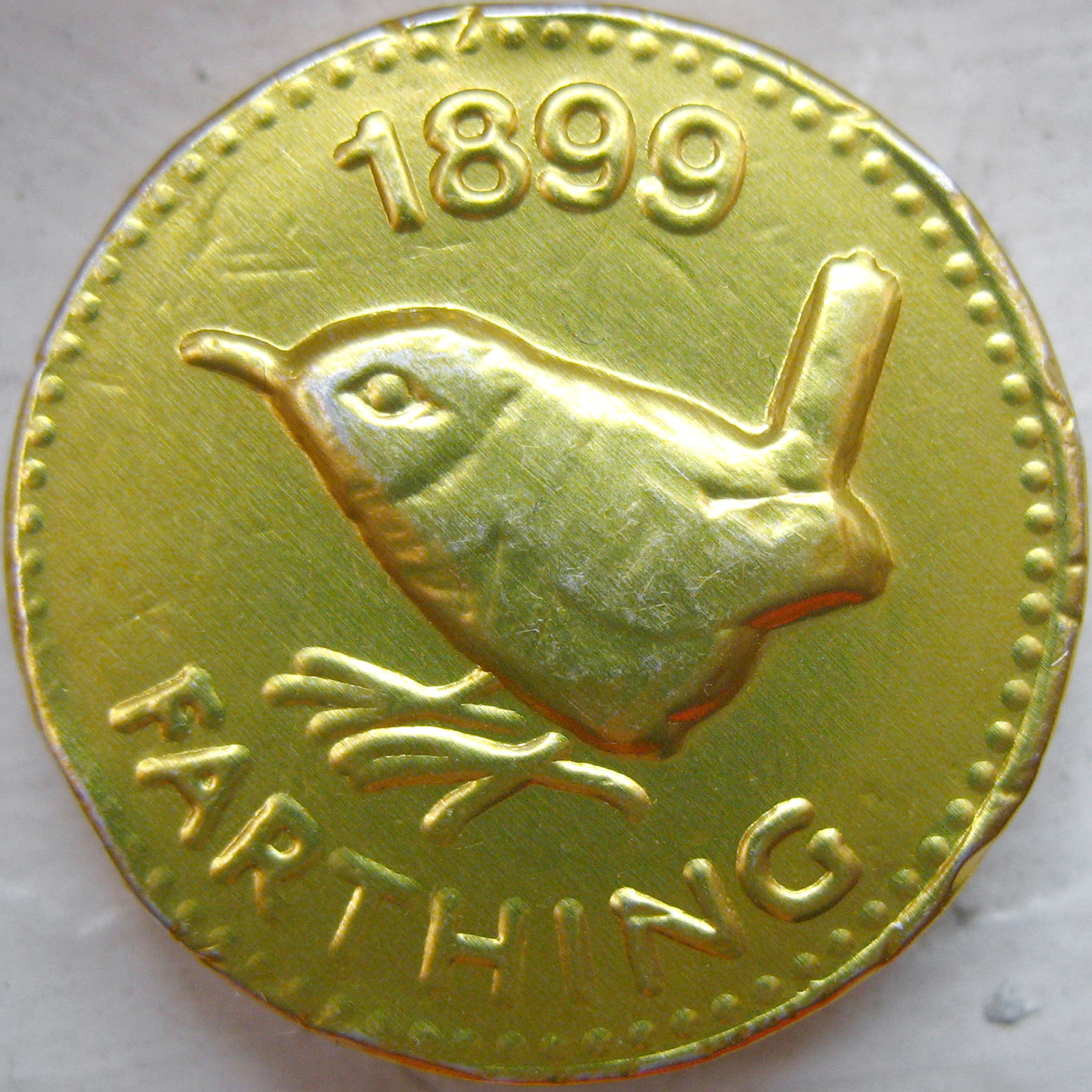
A wrapped chocolate coin designed to resemble a British farthing

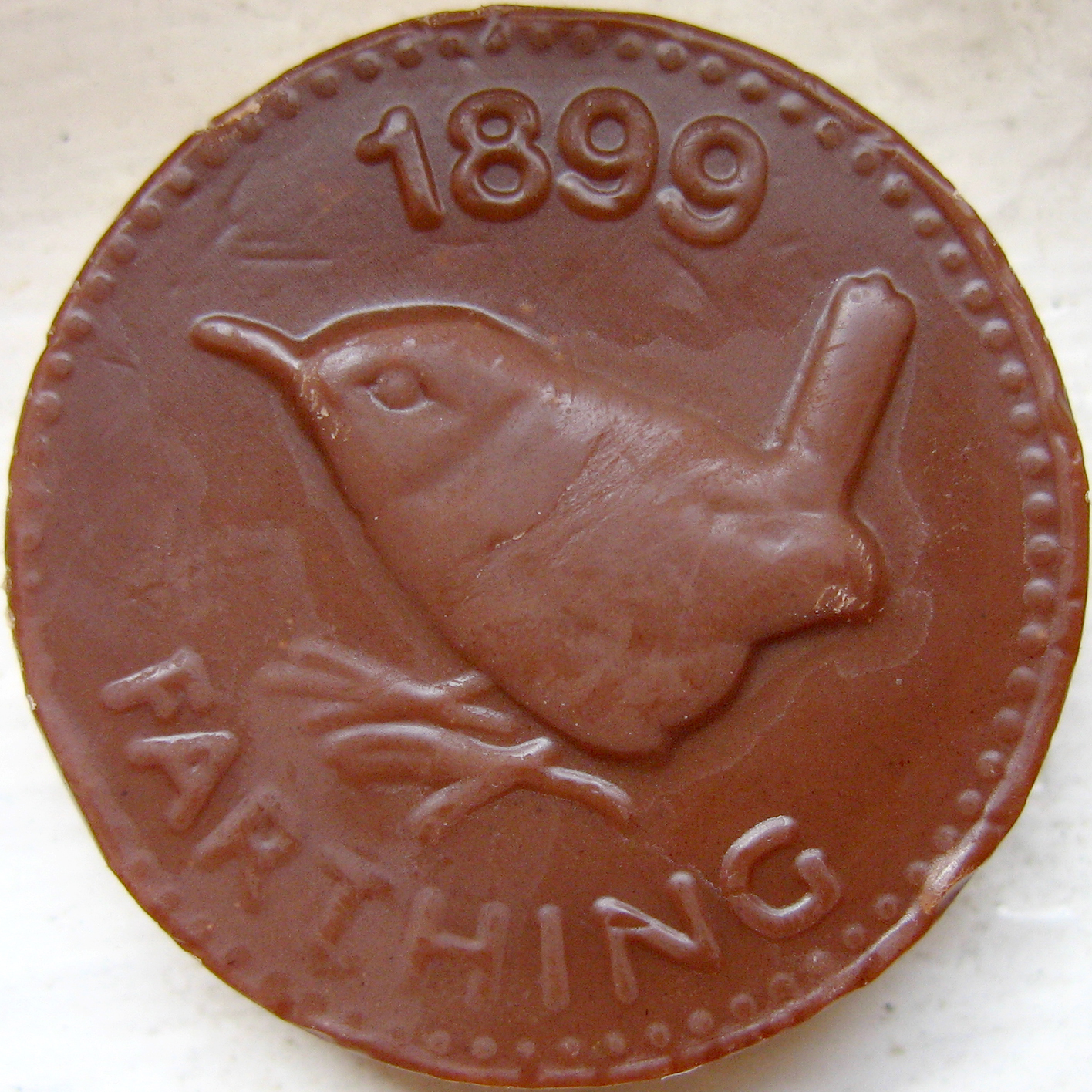
The same coin unwrapped

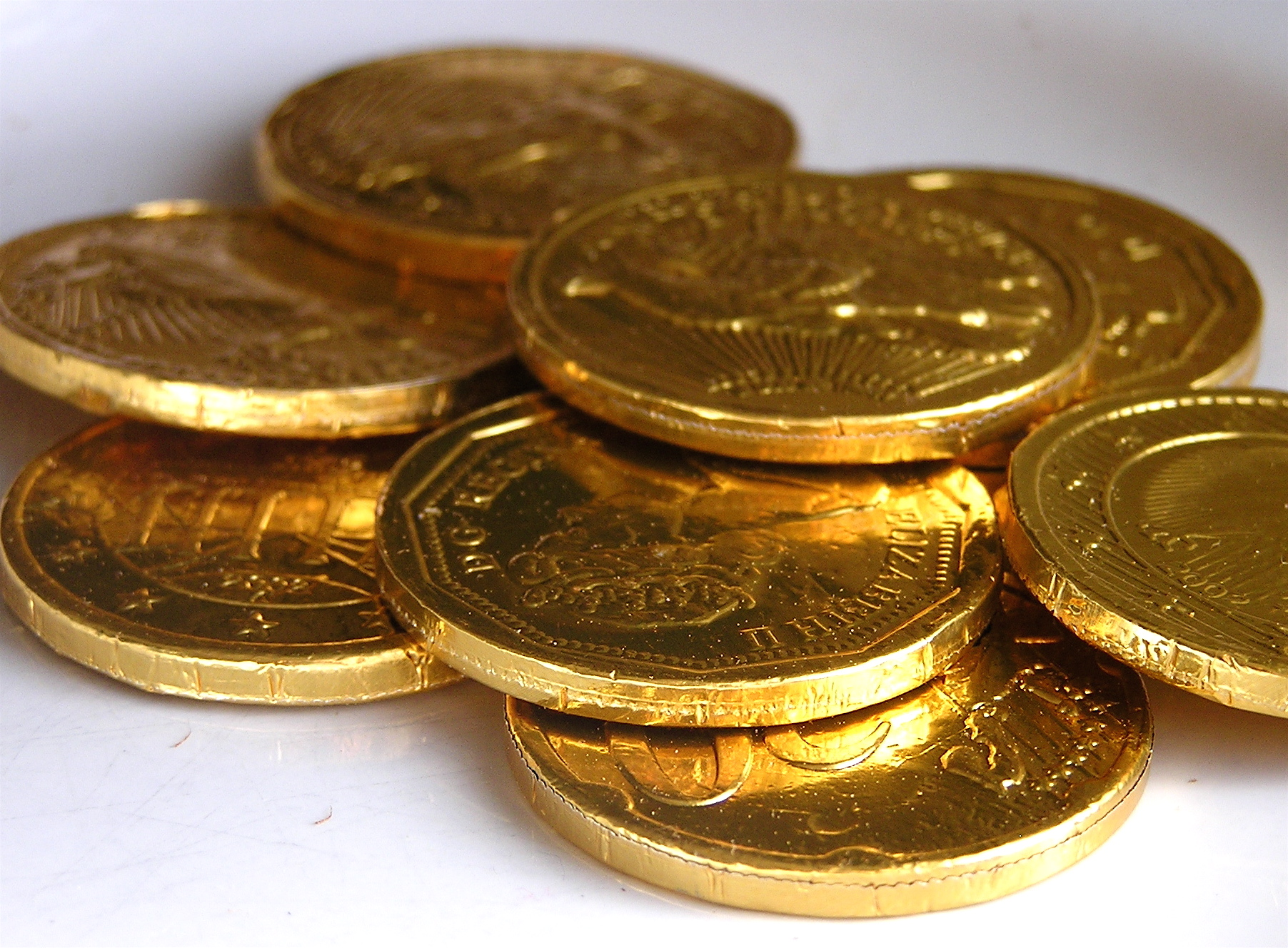
Wrapped chocolate coins mimicking coins of several currencies

Chocolate coins or chocolate money are foil-covered chocolates in the shape of coins. They are usually created with milk chocolate and are traditionally packaged in small mesh bags.

== Description ==
In the United Kingdom, chocolate coins mimic the design of real money; they are traditionally bought around Christmas and are used to decorate the Christmas tree and to fill children's stockings. When children visit a friend or relative they are allowed to take chocolates from the tree, or find them hidden throughout in the house. In Belgium, a tradition of giving chocolate coins at Christmas began to be observed at the start of the 20th century. These coins are presented wrapped in gold paper and placed in small bags.

During the Jewish festival of Hanukkah, chocolate coins are sometimes given to children in addition to or instead of the traditional gelt (gift of money), often with a dreidel. For Chinese New Year, chocolate coins are sometimes now given in place of traditional Hongbao or "lucky money".

During preparation, chocolate planchets are punched out of a long sheet. These blanks are then wrapped on both faces with tight foil wrappers. The wrapped coins are warmed and struck on both sides with coin-like dies, simultaneously embossing a design onto both the foil and the chocolate underneath. The current and former coin designs of many world countries are public domain, making a broad selection available for chocolates.

== Gallery ==
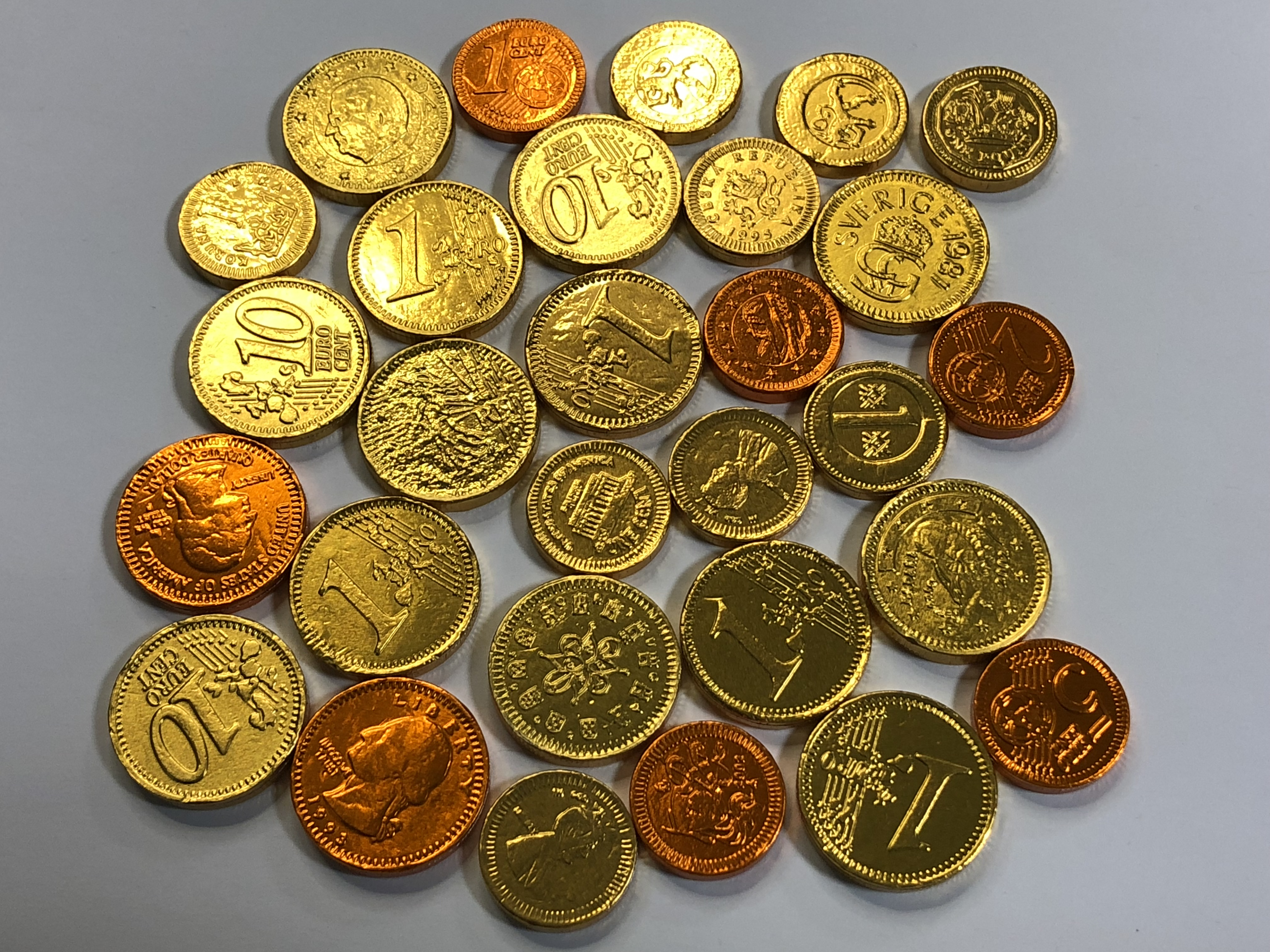
An assortment of chocolate coin designs

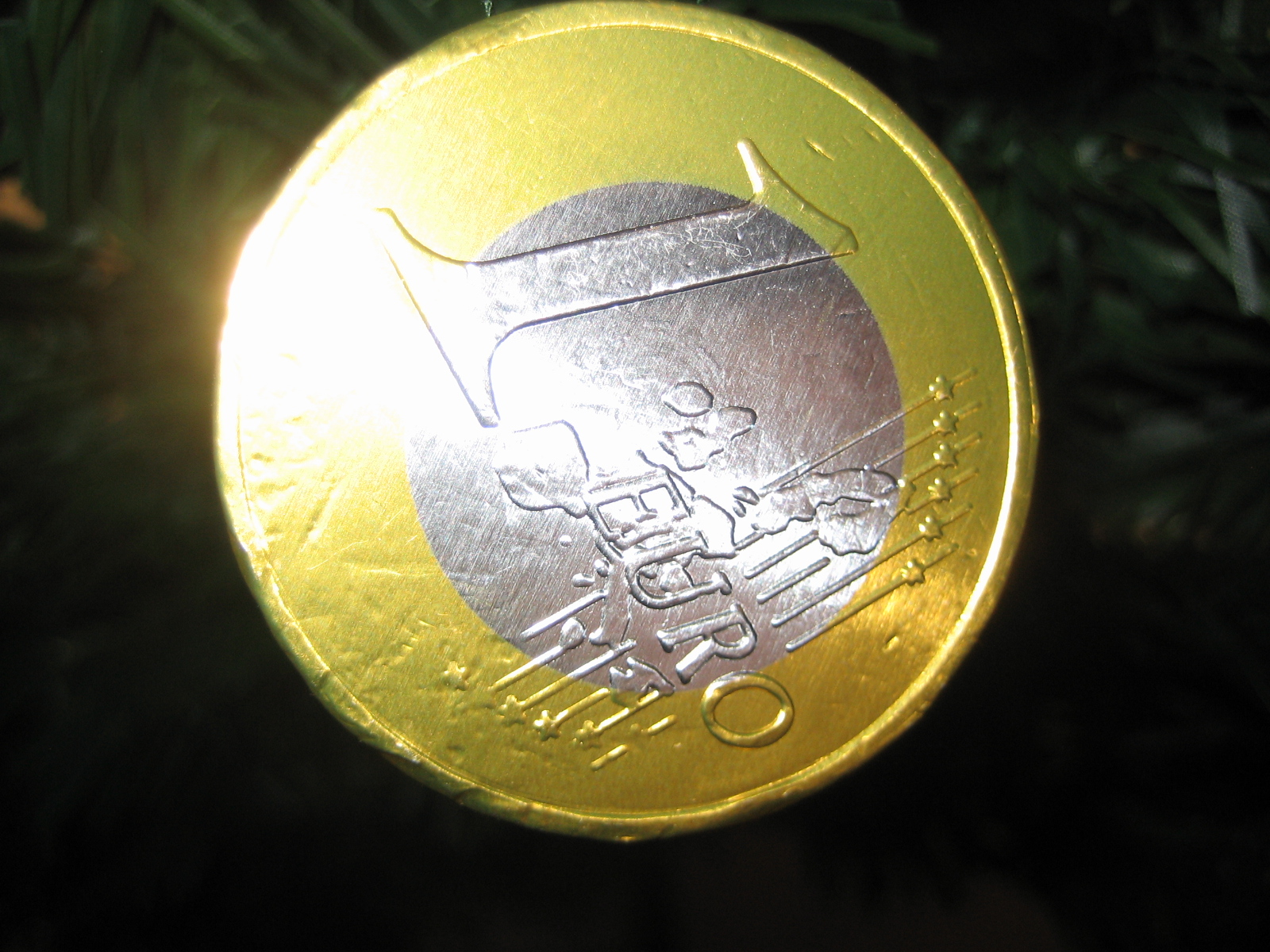
A two-tone chocolate Euro coin

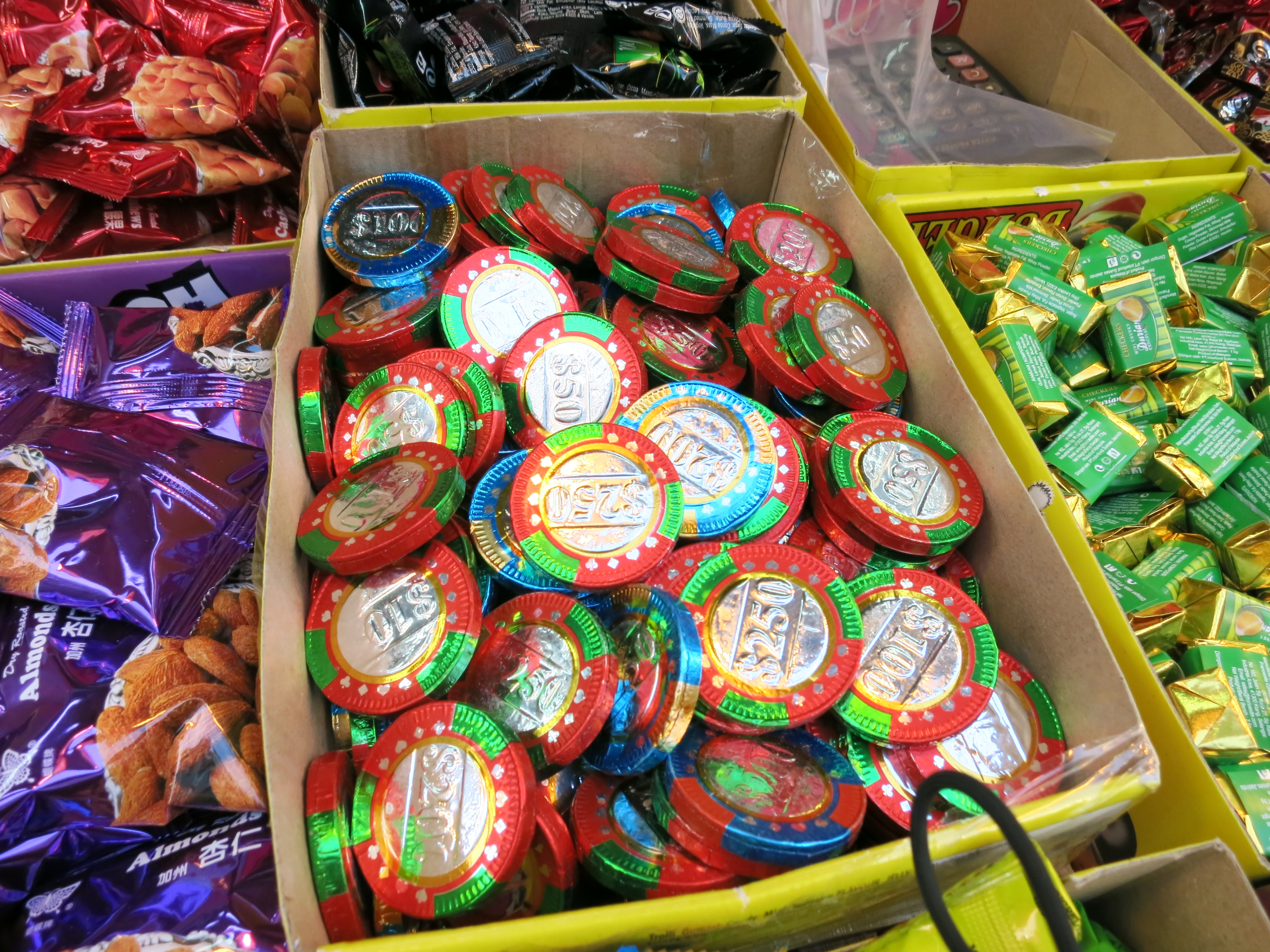
Chocolate casino chips in Hong Kong

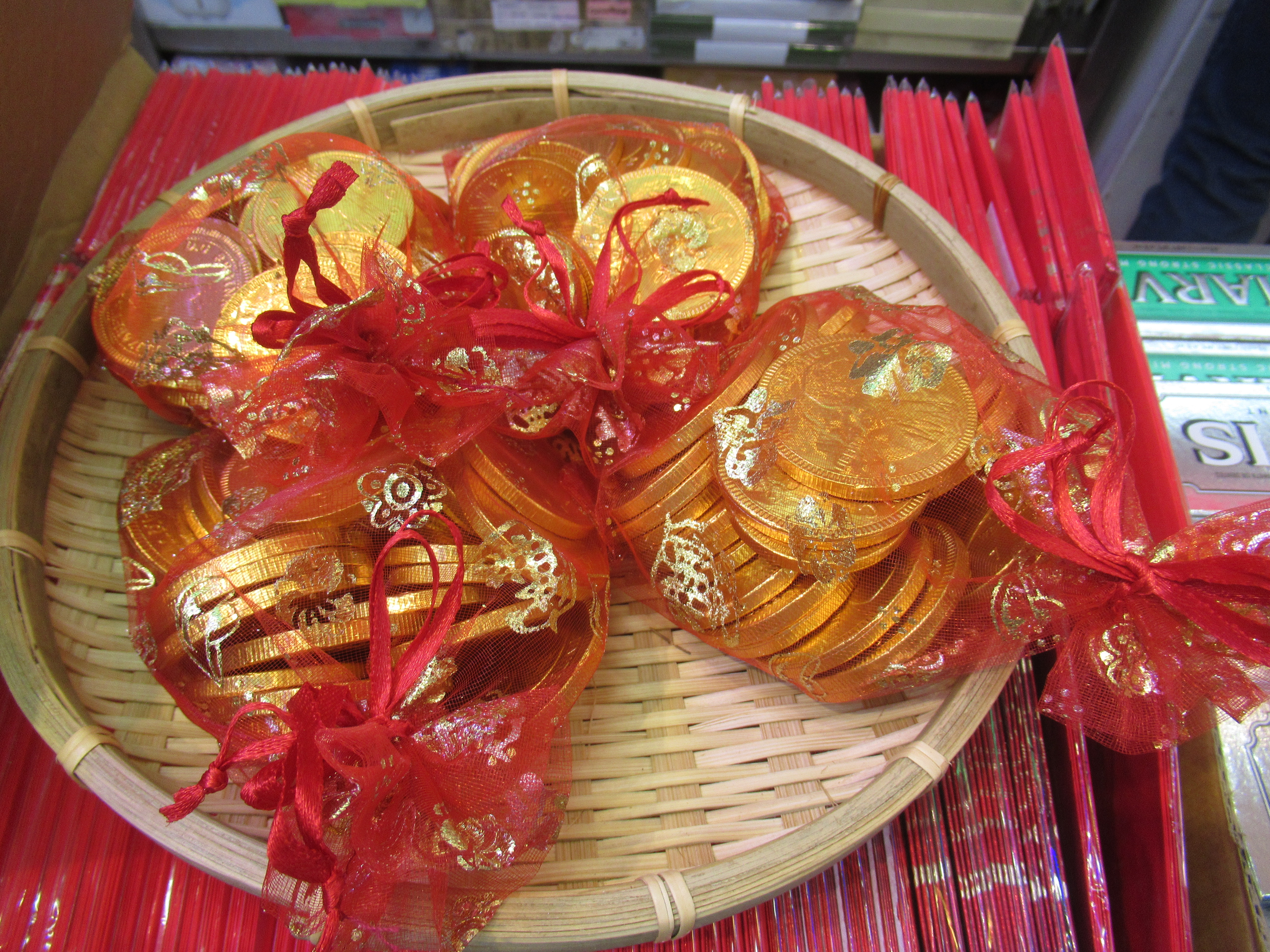
Lunar New Year gifts in Manila

== See also ==
- List of candies
- Play money
- Candy cigarette
