= Murro =

Murro is a surname. Notable people with the surname include:

- Murro, mononym of Danish singer
- Christian Murro (born 1978), Italian cyclist
- John de Murro (died 1312), a.k.a. Giovanni Mincio da Morrovalle, Italian Franciscan
- Mark Murro (born 1949), American javelin thrower
- Moshe Murro (born 1888), Israeli artist
- Noam Murro (born 1961), director of the films Smart People, Hateship, Friendship, Courtship, Loveship, Marriage and 300: Rise of an Empire
- Tom Murro, American journalist TV personality

== See also ==
- Murro the Marauder, a villain in Birdman and the Galaxy Trio
- Murro, a survivor in the video game Identity V
- a Portuguese manner of cooking potatoes for the bacalhau dish
