= Teetotum =

Spinning lot, generating random outcomes

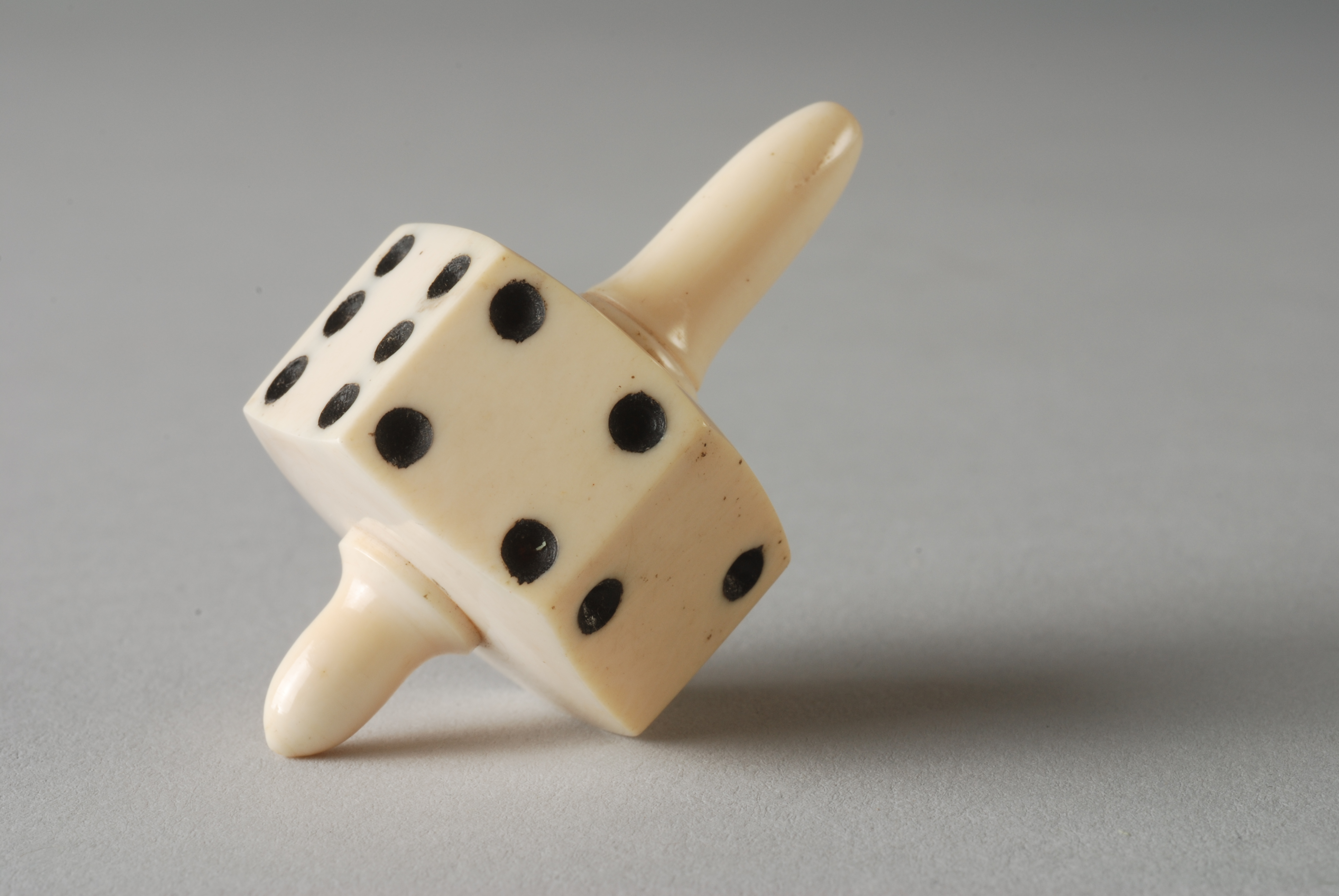
A teetotum

A teetotum (or T-totum) is a form of spinning top most commonly used for gambling games. It has a polygonal body marked with letters or numbers, which indicate the result of each spin. Usage goes back to at least ancient Greeks and Romans. The teetotum has variants such as the pirinola, used in Latin America, and the dreidel, used in Jewish communities during the holiday of Hanukkah.

== Description ==
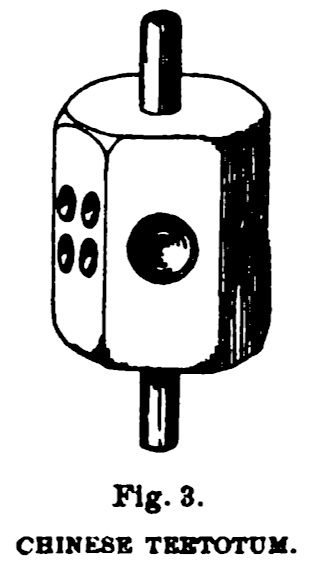
A six-sided Chinese teetotum

In its earliest form, the body was square (in some cases via a stick through a regular six-sided die), marked on the four sides by the letters A (Lat. aufer, take), indicating that the player takes one from the pool, D (Lat. depone, put down) when a fine has to be paid, N (Lat. nihil, nothing), and T (Lat. totum, all), when the whole pool is to be taken.

Other accounts give such letters as P, N, D (dimidium, half), and H or T or other combinations of letters. Some other combinations that could be found were NG, ZS, TA, TG, NH, ND, SL and M, which included the Latin terms Zona Salve ("save all"), Tibi Adfer ("take all"), Nihil Habeas ("nothing left"), Solve L ("save 50") and Nihil Dabis ("nothing happens").

Joseph Strutt, who was born in 1749, mentions the teetotum as used in games when he was a boy:

When I was a boy, the tee-totum had only four sides, each of them marked with a letter; a T for take all; an H for half, that is of the stake; an N for nothing; and a P for put down, that is, a stake equal to that you put down at first. Toys of this kind are now made with many sides and letters.

The teetotum was later adapted into the dreidel, a Jewish toy played with during Hanukkah. The dreidel typically has four sides: N (נ) for nothing; G (ג) for take all; H (ה) for take half, and S (ש) or P (פֹּ) for put one in. These letters form an acronym, in Hebrew, which recalls the miracle for which the holy day is celebrated; and, in Yiddish, which explains the rules of the game.

The perinola is a typically six-sided variant of the teetotum used in Latin America.

== See also ==
- Long dice – Type of dice
