= Hanukkah gelt =

Money given as presents during Hanukkah

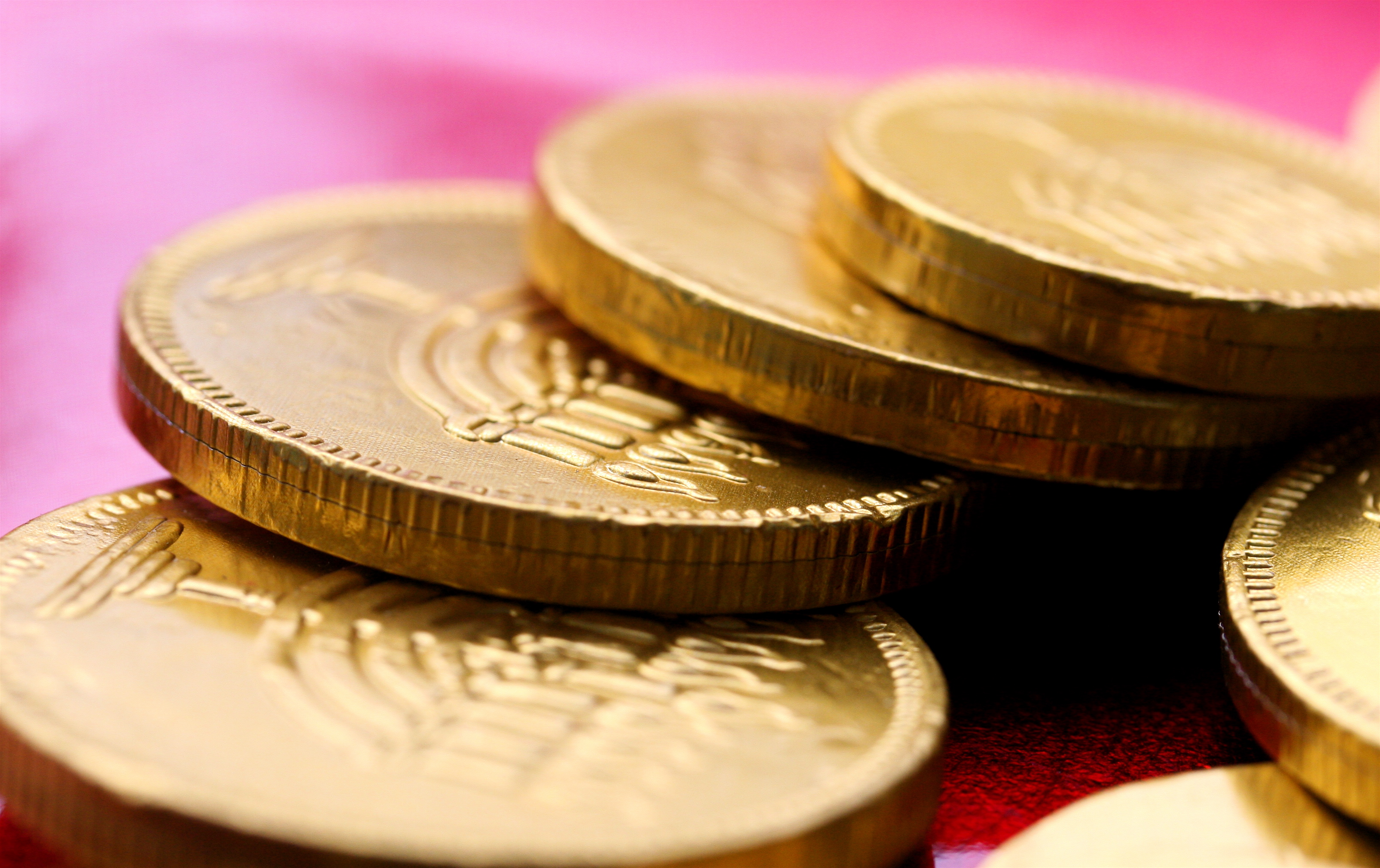
- Chocolate gelt
- Alternative names: Gelt, Dmei chanukah
- Type: Chocolate
- Main ingredients: Chocolate

Hanukkah gelt (Yiddish: חנוכה געלט ḥanukah gelt; Hebrew: דמי חנוכה dmei ḥanukah 'Hanukkah money'), also known as just gelt (German: Geld), is money given as presents during the Jewish festival of Hanukkah. It is typically given to children and sometimes teachers, often in conjunction with the game of Dreidel.

In the 20th century, candy manufacturers started selling Hanukkah-themed chocolate coins wrapped in gold or silver foil, as a substitute or supplement to real money gifts.

== History ==
=== Currency ===
Rabbi A. P. Bloch has written that

"The tradition of giving money (Chanukah gelt) to children is of long standing. The custom had its origin in the 17th-century practice of Polish Jewry to give money to their small children for distribution to their teachers. In time, as children demanded their due, money was also given to children to keep for themselves. Teenage boys soon came in for their share. According to Magen Avraham (18th century), it was the custom for poor yeshiva students to visit homes of Jewish benefactors who dispensed Chanukah money (Orach Chaim 670). The rabbis approved of the custom of giving money on Chanukah because it publicized the story of the miracle of the oil."

According to popular legend, it is linked to the miraculous victory of the Maccabees over the ancient Greeks. To celebrate their freedom, the Hasmoneans minted national coins. It may also have begun in 18th-century Eastern Europe as a token of gratitude toward religious teachers, similar to the custom of tipping service people on Christmas. In 1958, the Bank of Israel issued commemorative coins for use as Hanukkah gelt. That year, the coin bore the image of the same menorah that appeared on Maccabean coins 2,000 years ago.

=== Chocolate coins ===
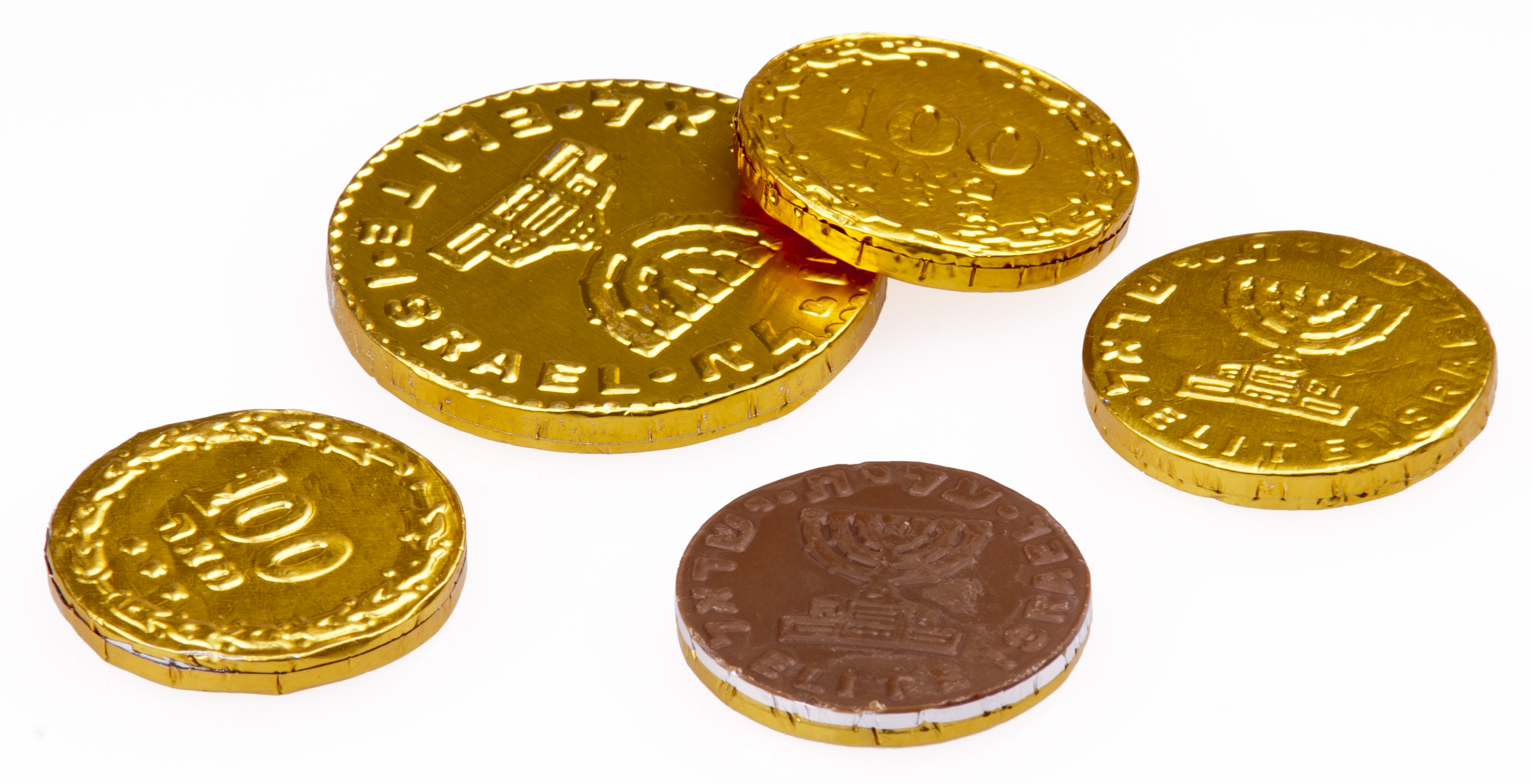
Chocolate coins by Elite

American chocolatiers of the 20th century picked up on the gift/coin concept by creating chocolate gelt. In the 1920s, Loft's, an American candy company, produced the first chocolate gelt, wrapped in gold or silver foil in mesh pouches resembling money bags. Loft's was followed by another US-based company called Bartons.

Today most of the chocolate Hanukkah gelt, sometimes called geld, sold in the United States is imported, including from Dutch firms Steenland Chocolate and the Israeli firms Elite and Carmit. Gourmet versions of chocolate gelt have been produced in the United States and Europe as well.

== Customs ==
Parents often give children chocolate gelt to play dreidel with. In terms of actual gelt (money), parents and grandparents or other relatives may give sums of money as an official Hanukkah gift. According to a survey done in 2006, 74 percent of parents in Israel give their children Chanukah gelt.

In Hasidic communities, the Rebbes distribute coins to those who visit them during Hanukkah. Hasidic Jews consider this to be an auspicious blessing from the Rebbe, and a segulah for success. The amount is usually in small coins.

=== Timing ===
Since money cannot be handled on the Sabbath, the timing of giving Chanukah gelt is limited by some to only one day of the week, since the fourth day can never occur on a Friday and the fifth lighting does not ever come on the Shabbat.

== See also ==
- List of candies
- Chocolate coins
