= Owzthat =

Dice-based cricket simulation

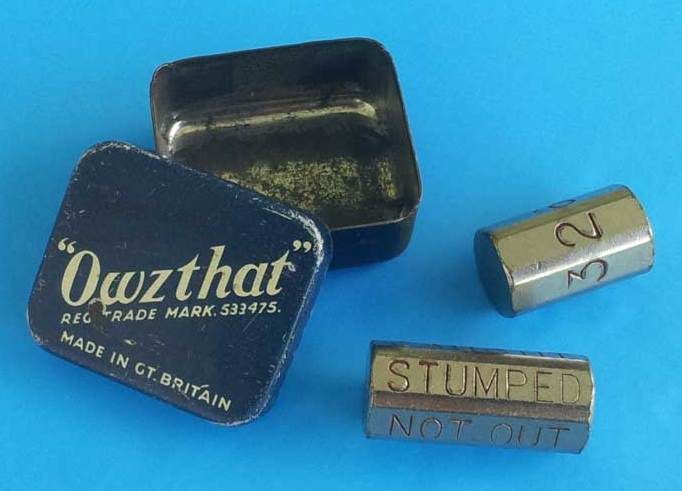
- Owzthat dice with tin

"Owzthat" is a dice-based cricket simulation from British firm William Lindop Ltd. It is a commercial form of pencil cricket.

== Pencil cricket ==
Pencil cricket originated in pre-war Britain as a simple dice game simulating cricket. Two dice were crafted by cutting lengths from a six-sided pencil, shaving off the paint to expose the bare wood, and writing the game's numbers and words on the sides.

== Lindop product ==
Lindop's name for its implementation of pencil cricket, Owzthat, is derived from a verbal appeal to the umpire, enquiring whether a batsman is out. The firm first produced the game in 1924 and patented it in 1932. The company was liquidated in 2014.

The product contains the rules on a small slip of paper and two, different, six-sided long dice made of metal with text engraved on each side of each die.

One die is referred to the batting die and has one side apiece marked with 1, 2, 3, 4, 6, and 'owzthat'. The second die is the bowling die and has the messages 'bowled', 'stumped', 'caught', 'not out', 'no ball', and 'L.B.W.' on one side apiece.

In later years the metal dice were replaced by a white plastic batting die with a green plastic bowling die, and ten red plastic disc counters added to help track fallen wickets.

== Gameplay ==
Owzthat simulates a cricket game with two teams. One person can play both teams, or different people can play for each of the two teams.

Score should be kept by recording the numbers of runs achieved and tracking the number of wickets that have fallen, for example using pencil and paper.

One team bats first, using the batting die, the other decides the outcome of 'owzthat' appeals using the bowling die.

The batting side starts the game by rolling the batting die. The side facing up after the roll is interpreted as either runs scored (if a number) or as an appeal for a lost wicket if it shows 'owzthat', in which case the bowling side rolls the bowler die to determine the result of the appeal.

The batsman continues play if 'Not Out' or 'No Ball' is rolled, receiving one run in the latter case. If any other result occurs, one wicket falls and the next batsman comes to the crease as long as the batting side has any wickets remaining.

Although not specifically stipulated by the rules included with the product, a cricket innings usually ends when 10 wickets have fallen. The other side then plays its batting innings. The team with the most runs after both have played a batting innings wins.

The rules do not mention real-life formats such as limited-over innings or multiple-innings matches, so players are free to simulate those rules if they so wish.

== See also ==
- Dice variants
