= Four-sided die =

Type of die

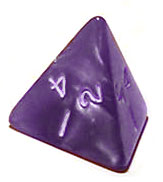
A regular tetrahedral die resting on its "1" face

Four-sided dice, abbreviated d4, are often used in tabletop role-playing games to obtain random integers in the range 1–4.

== Forms ==
Several forms exist of this die. One is a regular tetrahedron, which is a triangular pyramid with four equilateral triangle-shaped faces. They are nicknamed caltrops, and are peculiar in that there is no topmost face when a die comes to rest. There are several common ways of indicating the value rolled. Some of these dice have three numbers on each face. The number rolled is indicated by the number shown upright on all three visible faces—either near the midpoints of the sides around the bottom or near the angles around the top. Another configuration places only one number on each face, and the rolled number is taken from the downward face.

Another form of d4s are long dice with four isosceles triangle-shaped faces, sometimes called wedge dice. They do not roll well and are thus usually thrown into the air or shaken in a box.

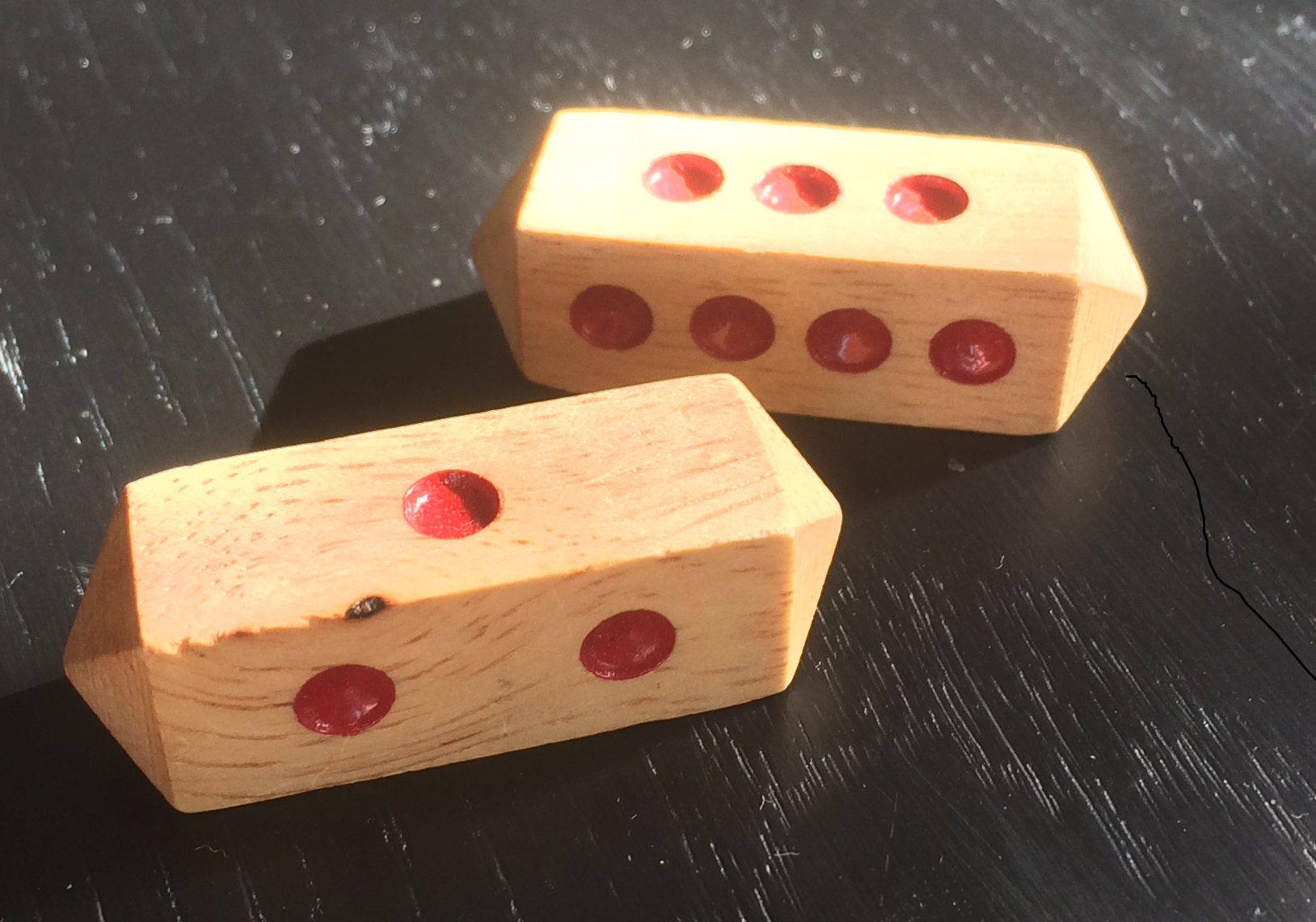
Four-faced Daldøs dice

A third form of d4s are long dice shaped like rectangular prisms, as used in the Scandinavian game daldøs. Landing on end may be rendered very rare simply by their small size relative to the faces, by the instability implicit in the height of the dice, and by rolling the long dice along their axes rather than tossing. Many long dice provide further insurance against landing on end by giving the ends a rounded or peaked shape, rendering such an outcome physically impossible (at least on a flat solid surface).

== Historical ==
Four-sided dice were among the gambling and divination tools used by early man who carved them from nuts, wood, stone, ivory and bone. Six-sided dice were invented later but four-sided dice continued to be popular in Russia. In Ancient Rome, elongated four-sided dice were called tali while the six-sided cubic dice were tesserae. In India and Tibet, three four-sided long dice were rolled sequentially as an oracle, to produce 1 of 64 possible outcomes.

The ancient Mesopotamian Royal Game of Ur uses eight four-sided pyramid-shaped dice made out of rock, half of them colored white, and half black.

== Modern gaming ==
Role-playing games involving four-sided regular tetrahedral dice include Dungeons & Dragons, and Pathfinder Roleplaying Game. The d20 System includes a four-sided regular tetrahedral die among other dice with 6, 8, 10, 12 and 20 faces.
