= Dreidel =

Four-sided spinning top used on Hanukkah

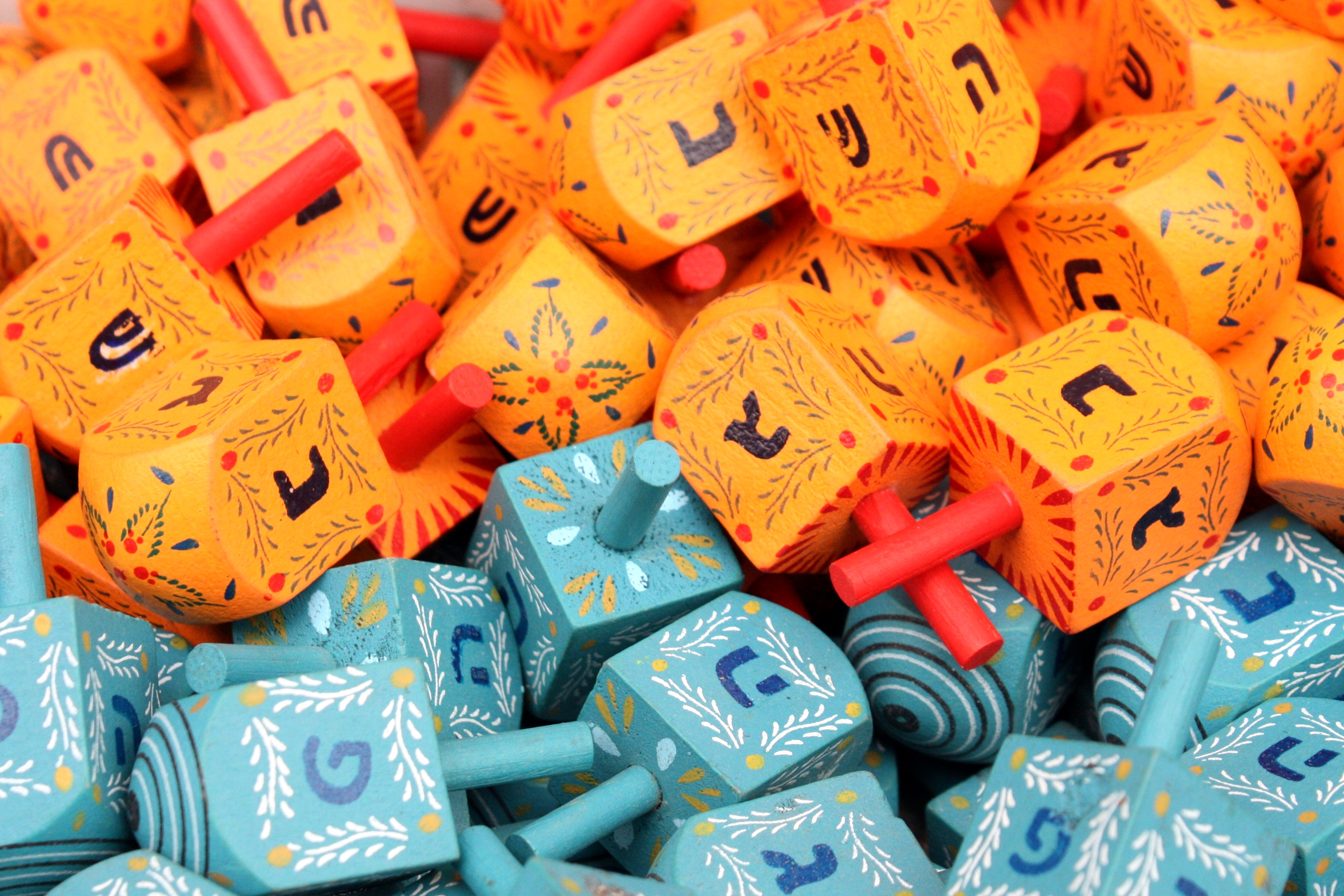
Dreidels for sale at Mahane Yehuda Market in Jerusalem, Israel, with Israel specific lettering on blue dreidels (נ ג ה פ) and diaspora lettering on orange dreidels (נ ג ה ש)

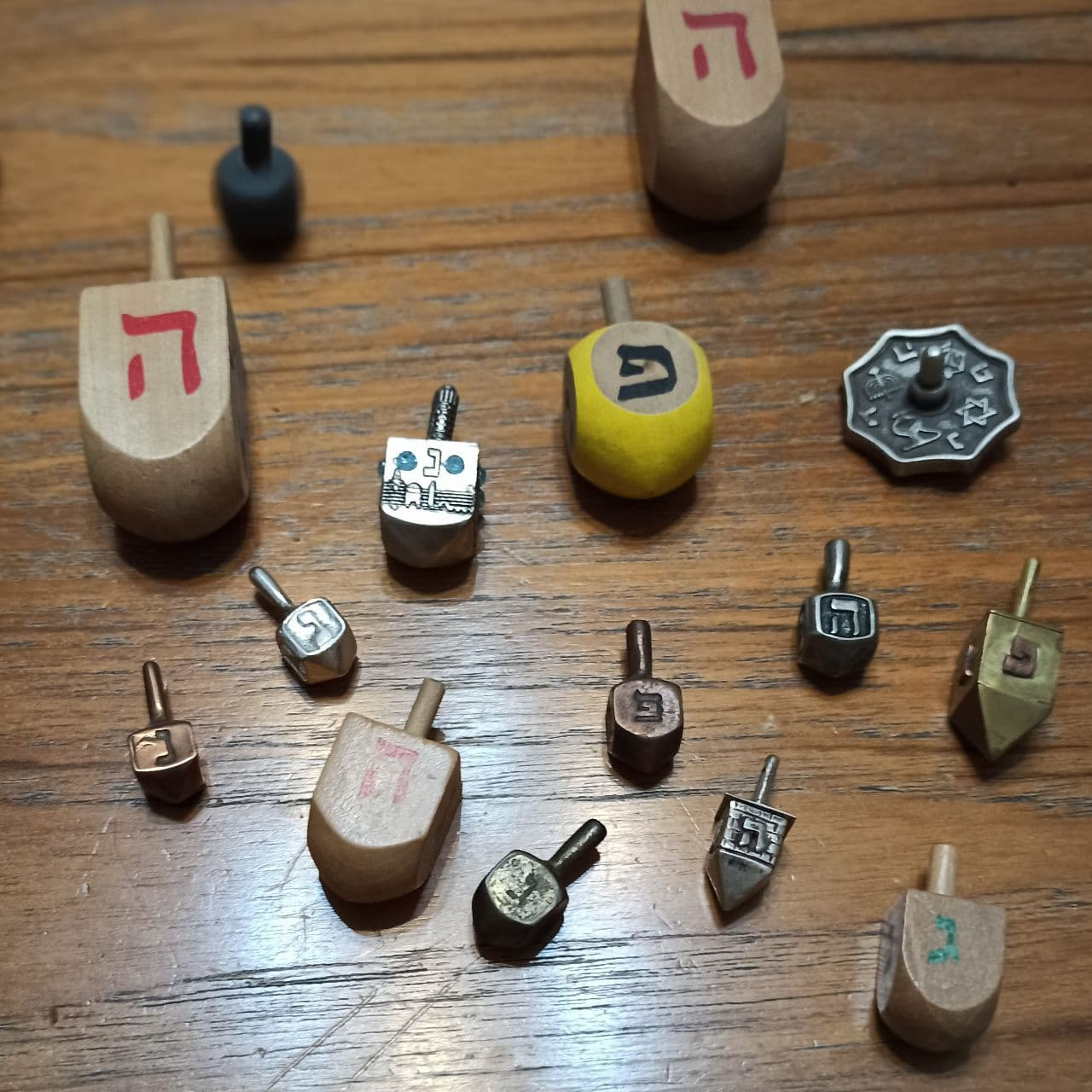
A variety of dreidels

A dreidel, also dreidle or dreidl, (/ˈdreɪdəl/ DRAY-dəl; Yiddish: דרײדל, romanized: dreydl, plural: dreydlech; (Note: Dreydlekh is also a term in klezmer music.) Hebrew: סביבון, romanized: sevivon) is a four-sided spinning top, played with during the Jewish holiday of Hanukkah. The dreidel is a Jewish variant on the teetotum, a gambling toy found in Europe and Latin America.

Each side of the dreidel bears a letter of the Hebrew alphabet: נ (nun), ג (gimel), ה (hei), ש (shin). These letters are represented in Yiddish as a mnemonic for the rules of a gambling game possibly derived from teetotum played with a dreidel: nun stands for the word נישט (nisht, "not", meaning "nothing"), gimel for גאַנץ (gantz, "entire, whole"), hei for האַלב (halb, "half"), and shin for שטעל אַרײַן (shtel arayn, "put in").

However, according to folk etymology, these four letters represent the Hebrew phrase נֵס גָּדוֹל הָיָה שָׁם (nes gadól hayáh sham, "a great miracle happened there"), referring to the miracle of the cruse of oil. For this reason, most dreidels in Israel replace the letter shin with the letter פ (pe), to represent the phrase נֵס גָּדוֹל הָיָה פֹּה (nes gadól hayáh poh, "a great miracle happened here");

As many Haredi communities insisted that shin be used in the Land of Israel (because "there" refers to the Temple in Jerusalem and not Israel entirely), five-sided dreidels were invented in 2022 to represent the Hebrew phrase נֵס גָּדוֹל הָיָה שָׁם פֹּה (nes gadól hayáh sham poh, "a great miracle happened here and there" or "a great miracle happened everywhere"). Twenty-sided dreidels are unique as they are not spinning tops but twenty-sided dice instead.

While not mandated (a mitzvah) for Hanukkah (the only traditional mitzvot are lighting candles and saying the full hallel), spinning the dreidel is a traditional game played during the holiday.

== Origins ==
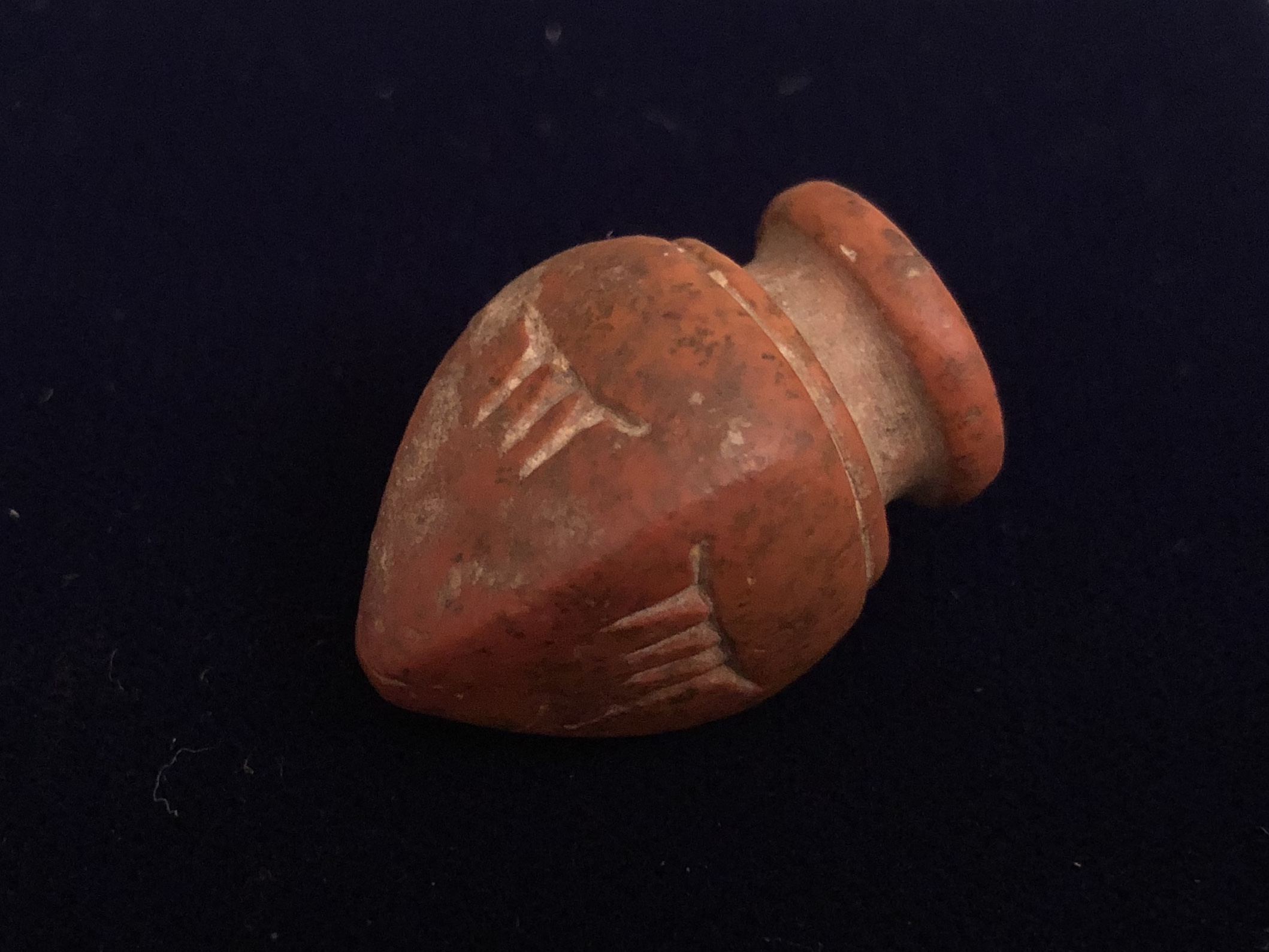
Ancient Middle Eastern top resembling a dreidel

Astronaut Jeffrey A. Hoffman spins a dreidel in space in 1993

The dreidel possibly developed from an Irish or English top introduced into Germany known as a teetotum, which was popular around Christmas time and dates back to ancient Greek and Roman times.

The teetotum was inscribed with letters denoting the Latin words for "nothing", "everything", "half", and "put in". In German this came to be called a trendel, with German letters for the same concepts. Adapted to the Hebrew alphabet when Jews adopted the game, these letters were replaced by nun which stands for the Yiddish word נישט (nisht, "not", meaning "nothing"), gimel for גאַנץ (gants, "entire, whole"), hei for האַלב (halb, "half"), and shin for שטעל אַרײַן (shtel arayn, "put in"). The letters served as a means to recalling the rules of the game.

This theory states that when the game spread to Jewish communities unfamiliar with Yiddish, the denotations of the Hebrew letters were not understood. As a result, there arose Jewish traditions to explain their assumed meaning. However, in Judaism there are often multiple explanations developed for words. A popular conjecture had it that the letters abbreviated the words נֵס גָּדוֹל הָיָה שָׁם (nes gadól hayá sham, "a great miracle happened there"), an idea that became attached to dreidels when the game entered into Hanukkah festivities.

According to a tradition first documented in 1890, the game was developed by Jews who illegally studied the Torah in seclusion as they hid, sometimes in caves, from the Seleucids under Antiochus IV. At the first sign of Seleucids approaching, their Torah scrolls would be concealed and be replaced by dreidels. The variant names goyrl (destiny) and varfl (a little throw) were also current in Yiddish, until the Holocaust. "Dreidel" was translated to modern Hebrew as sevivon (Hebrew: סביבון; see Etymology below), and in modern Israel the letters were altered, with shin generally replaced by pe. This yields the reading נֵס גָּדוֹל הָיָה פֹּה (nes gadól hayá po, "a great miracle happened here").

== Etymology ==
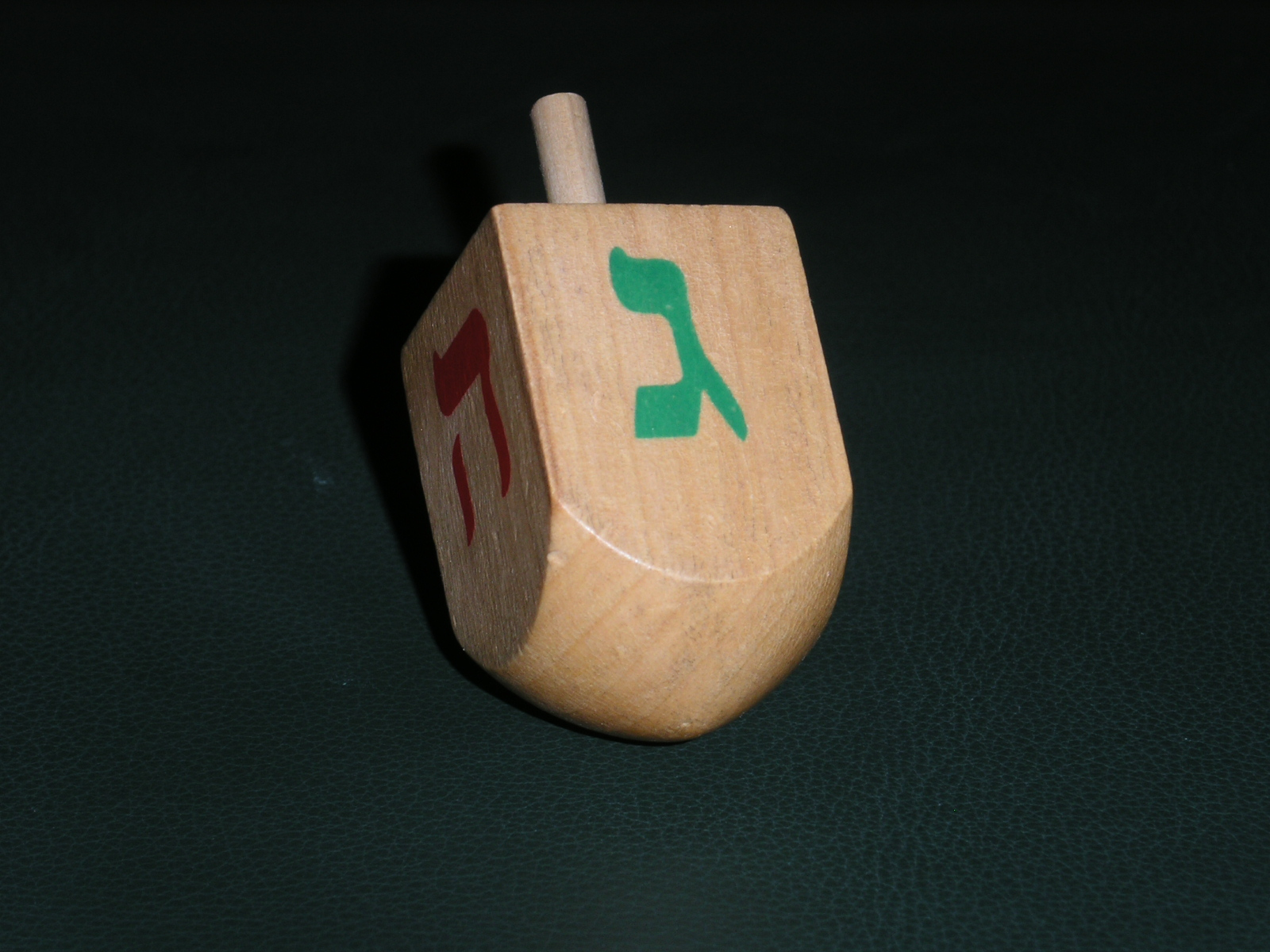
Wooden dreidel

The Yiddish word dreydl comes from the word dreyen ("to turn", compare to drehen, meaning the same in German). The Hebrew word sevivon comes from the Semitic root SBB ("to turn") and was invented by Itamar Ben-Avi (the son of Eliezer Ben-Yehuda) when he was five years old. Hayyim Nahman Bialik used a different word, kirkar (from the root KRKR – "to spin"), in his poems, but it was not adopted into spoken Hebrew.

In the lexicon of Ashkenazi Jews from Udmurtia and Tatarstan the local historian A. V. Altyntsev utilised several other appellations of a dreidel, such as volchok (Russian: волчок, "top"), khanuke-volchok, fargl, varfl, dzihe and zabavke (Russian: забавка, "entertaining piece", "toy").

== Symbolism ==
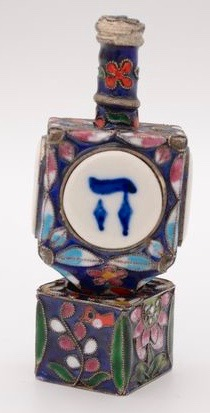
Antique enamel dreidel from Russia

Some rabbis ascribe symbolic significance to the markings on the dreidel. One commentary, for example, connects the four letters with the four nations to which the House of Judah was historically subject—Babylonia, Persia, the Seleucid Empire and Rome. A gematria reading yields the number 358, identical to the value of the four letters used to spell "Moshiach" (Messiah).

== Rules of the game ==
Each player begins with an equal number of game pieces (usually 10–15). The game pieces can be any object, such as chocolate gelt, pennies, raisins, etc.

- To start the game, every participant puts one game piece into the center "pot". Every player also puts one piece into the pot when the pot is empty or there is only one game piece in the pot.
- Each player spins the dreidel once during their turn. Depending on which side is facing up when it stops spinning, the player whose turn it is gives or takes game pieces from the pot:
  - If נ (nun) is facing up, the player does nothing (Yiddish: nischt).
  - If ג (gimel) is facing up, the player gets everything (Yiddish: ganz) in the pot.
  - If ה (hei) is facing up, the player gets half (Yiddish: halb) of the pieces in the pot. If there are an odd number of pieces in the pot, the player takes half the pot rounded up to the nearest whole number. If hei is facing up and only one piece is in the pot, the player can either take the piece or not.
  - If ש (shin) is facing up, the player donates (Yiddish: schenk) one of their game pieces to the pot (sometimes accompanied by the chant "shin, shin, put one in"). In some game versions, the player adds three game pieces to the pot, one for each stem of the letter shin (ש).
- If the player is out of pieces, they are either "out" or may ask another player for a "loan".

These rules are comparable to the rules for a classic four-sided teetotum, where the letters A, D, N and T form a mnemonic for the rules of the game, aufer (take), depone (put), nihil (nothing), and totum (all). Similarly, the Hebrew letters on a dreidel may be taken as a mnemonic for the game rules in Yiddish. Occasionally, in the United States, the Hebrew letters on the dreidel form an English-language mnemonic about the rules: hei or "H" for "half"; gimel or "G" for "get all"; nun or "N" for "nothing"; and shin or "S" for "share".

=== Analysis of the game ===
Thomas Robinson and Sujith Vijay have shown that the expected number of spins in a game of dreidel is O(n^{2}), where n is the number of game pieces each player begins with. The implied constant depends on the number of players.

Robert Feinerman has shown that the game of dreidel is unfair, in that the first player to spin has a better expected outcome than the second player, and the second better than the third, and so on.

=== Tournaments ===
Dreidel is now a spoof competitive sport in North America. Major League Dreidel (MLD), founded in New York City in 2007, hosts dreidel tournaments during the holiday of Hanukkah. In MLD tournaments the player with the longest time of spin (TOS) is the winner. MLD is played on a Spinagogue, the official spinning stadium of Major League Dreidel. Pamskee was the 2007 MLD Champion. Virtual Dreidel was the 2008 MLD Champion. In 2009, Major League Dreidel launched a game version of the Spinagogue.

In 2009, Good Morning America published a story on Dreidel Renaissance reporting on the rising popularity of the dreidel. Dreidel games that have come out on the market since 2007 include No Limit Texas Dreidel, a cross between traditional dreidel and Texas Hold'em poker, invented by a Judaica company called ModernTribe. Other new dreidel games include Staccabees and Maccabees.

== Collections ==
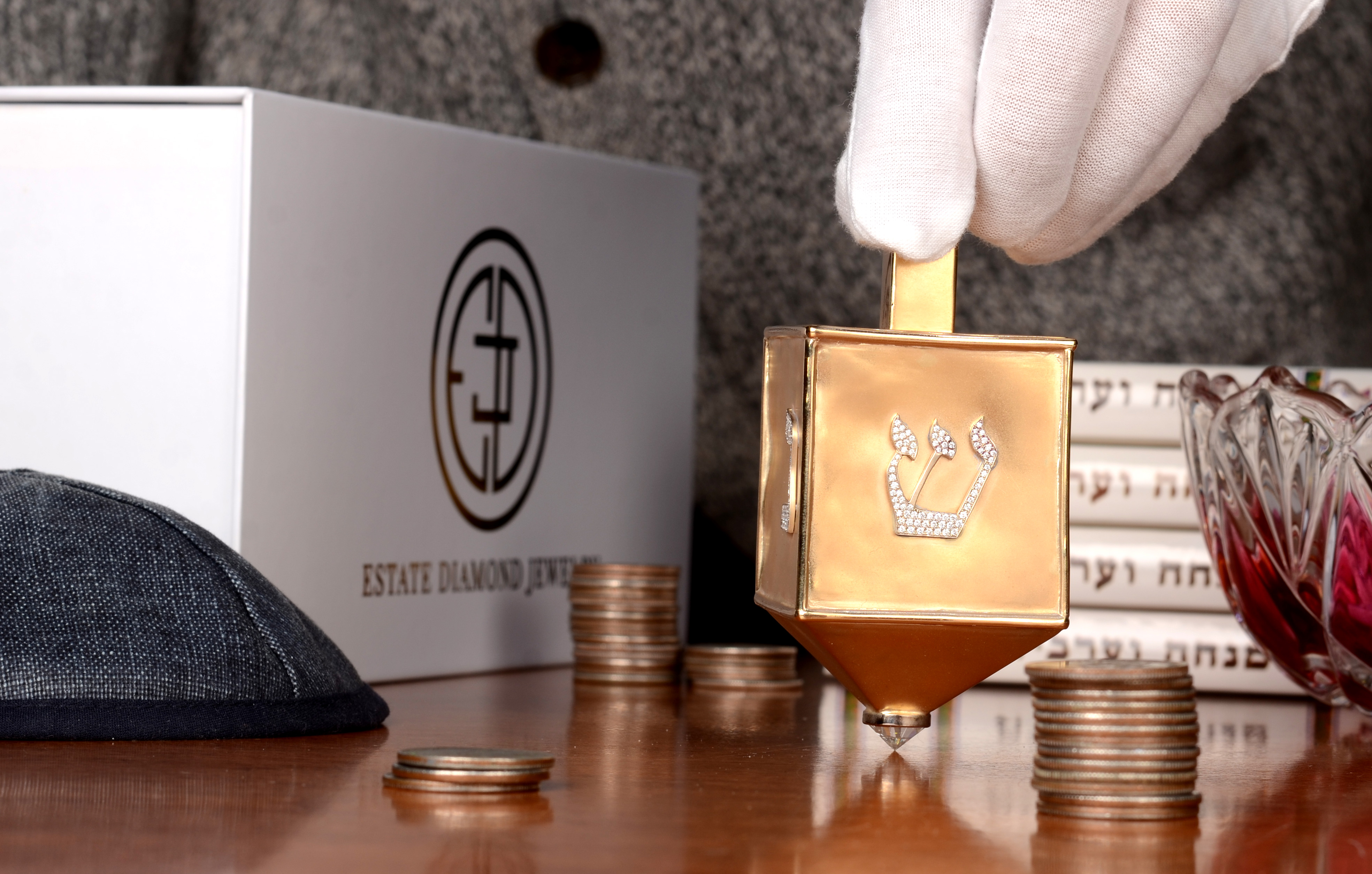
The world's most valuable dreidel, valued at $70,000 in 2019

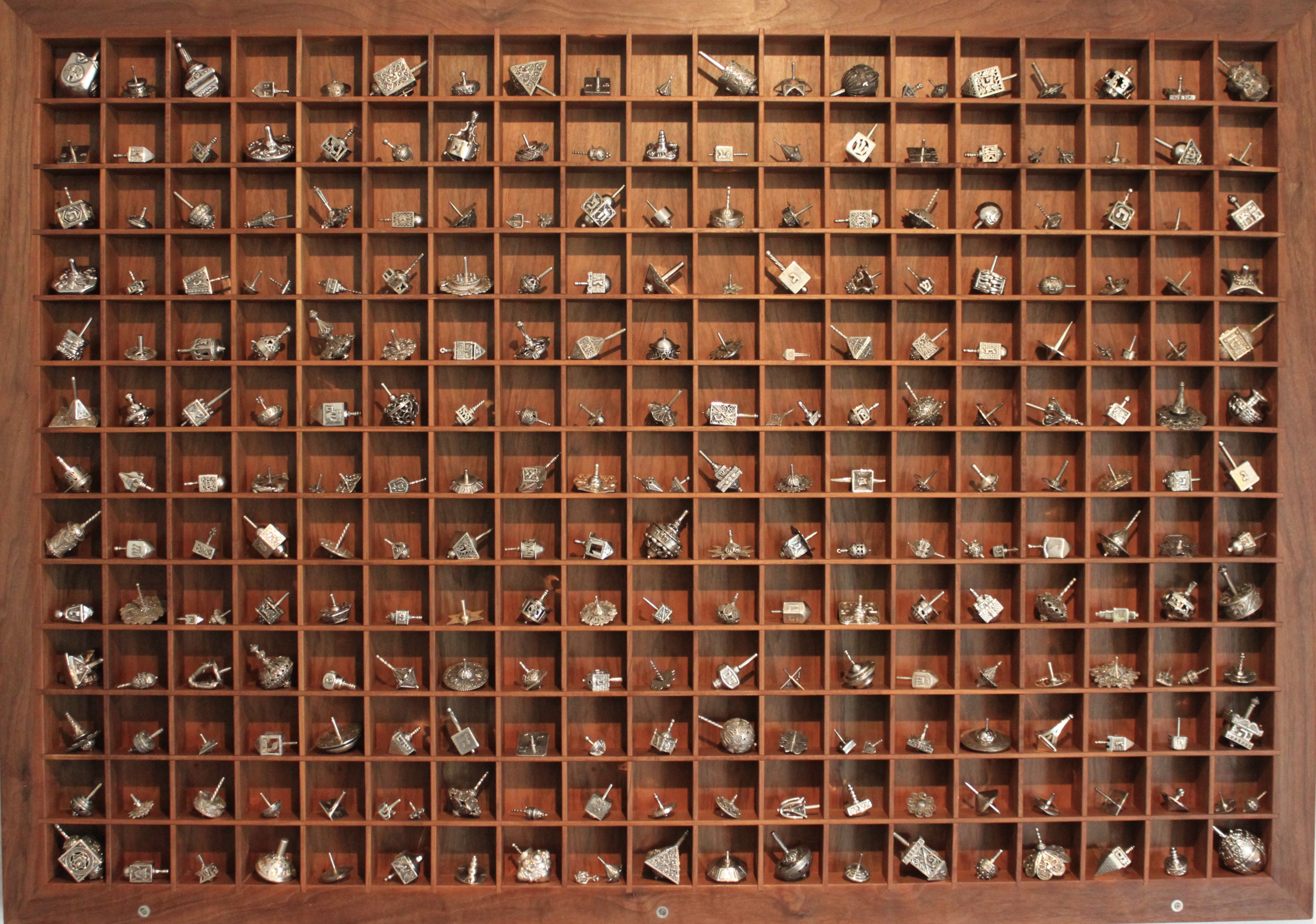
Silver Dreidel Collection

Childhood enjoyment of dreidels has led to a growing interest in collecting them in adulthood. Jewish institutions such as the Spertus Institute for Jewish Learning and Leadership, Yeshiva University Museum and Temple Emanu-El in New York, house dreidel collections, as do museums such as the Spinning Top and Yo-Yo Museum in Burlington, Wisconsin.

Antique dreidels are of increasing value and interest: different styles of dreidels are to be found across the world. Exemplars include dreidels fashioned in wood, silver, brass and lead. One particularly rare dreidel is cast from an ivory original by Moshe Murro from the Bezalel Academy in Jerusalem in 1929. Rare collectible dreidels from Cochin are made from iron; they are black in colour decorated with silver markings, made by an intricate Bidriware style process.

The Guinness World Record for Most Valuable Dreidel was achieved by Estate Diamond Jewelry in November 2019 and was valued at $70,000 ($88,149 adjusted for inflation).

The design of Estate Diamond Jewelry's dreidel was inspired by the Chrysler Building in New York. Previous holders of the title were Chabad of South Palm Beach with a dreidel valued at $14,000 ($19,040 adjusted for inflation).

== See also ==
- "I Have a Little Dreidel", a song sung when playing dreidel
- Hanukkah music
- Hanukkah gelt
- Jewish ceremonial art
