= Moshe Murro =

Israeli artist

Moshe Murro משה מורו
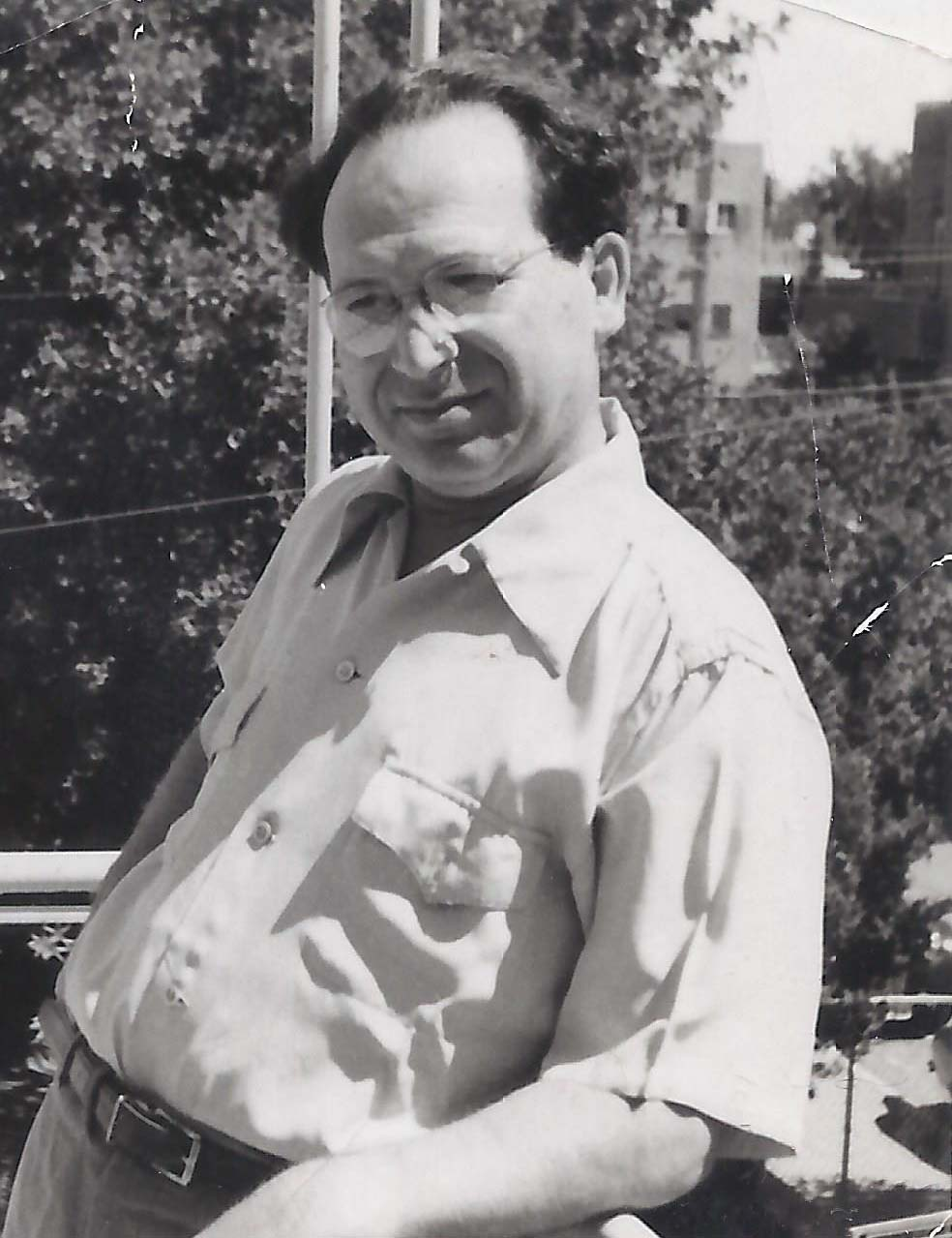
- Photograph of Moshe Murro
- Born: 1888
- Died: Unknown
- Education: Bezalel school, Jerusalem
- Known for: Painting
- Movement: Israeli art

Moshe Murro (Hebrew: משה מורו) was an Israeli artist.

== Biography ==
Moshe Murro was born in 1888. He set up a Kamiya (Amulet) workshop, to restore old ivory or stone amulets at the Bezalel Academy of Arts and Design in Jerusalem between the 1920s–1930s. Moshe Moro died in 1957.

== Artistic career ==
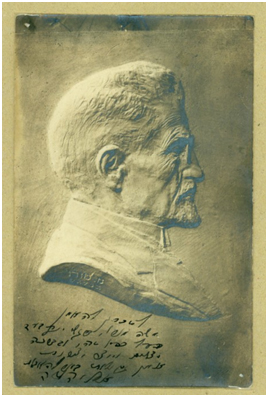
Moshe Murro, copper plate

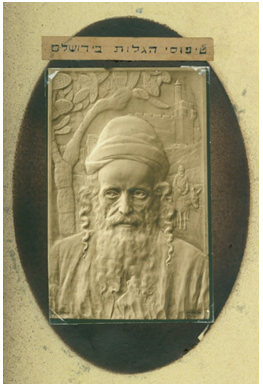
Moshe Murro, A Returning Jew in Jerusalem, ivory

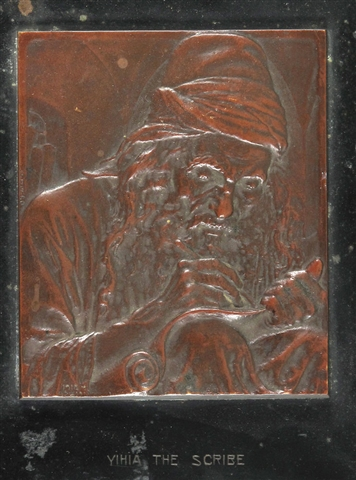
Moshe Murro, The Scribe, copper plate

There are some works of Moshe Murro which have recently seen light in auction houses. An album with original photographs of more than 50 of his works, brass and bronze embossments, sculpting in ivory and stone accompanied by titles: in the Old City, Eliezer ben Yehuda, Henrietta Szold, Balfour, was recently sold. In addition other items have been up for sale.

== Teaching ==
- Bezalel Academy of Art, Jerusalem
