= Nard (game) =

Tables-style board game for two players

Persian tables game, possibly ancestral to backgammon
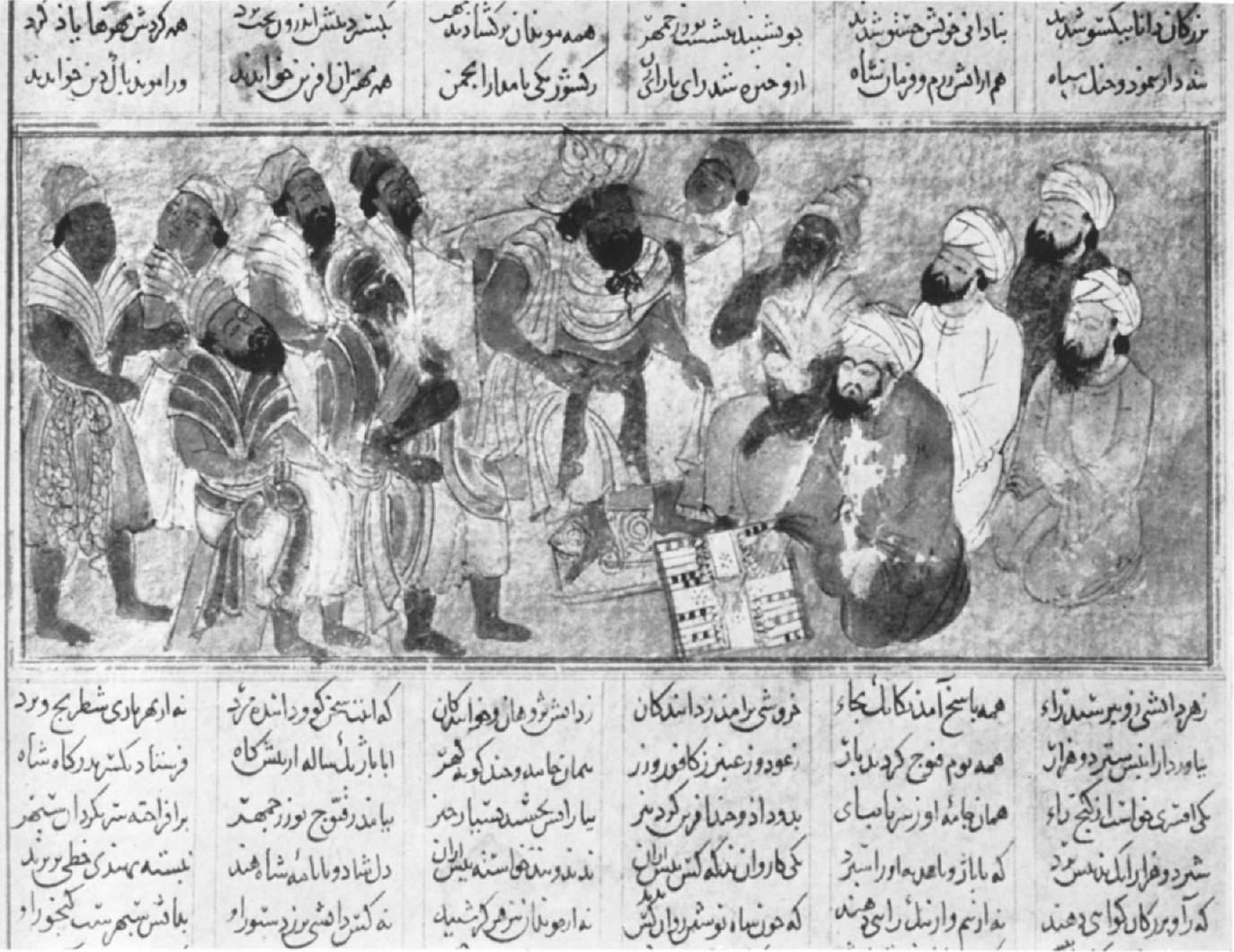
- Bozorgmehr demonstrates the game of Nardshir to the Indian rajas
- Other names: Nardshir
- Genres: Board game Dice game
- Players: 2
- Movement may be contrary or parallel depending on the variant

Nard (Persian: نرد, also narde or nardshir; from Middle Persian: nywʾlthšyl nēw-ardaxšīr) is a historical Persian tables game for two players that is sometimes considered ancestral to backgammon. It is still played today, albeit in a different form. As in other tables games, the playing pieces are moved around a board according to rolls of dice. It uses a standard tables board, but has a different opening layout and rules of play from that of backgammon.

== History ==
The game has been historically popular in Persia, Muslim countries, and among Babylonian Jews. A common legend associates the game with the founder of the Sassanian Dynasty, Ardashir. Indeed, the Persian name نرد nard is a shortening of the older name نردشیر nardašir, from Middle Persian nēw-ardaxšīr "brave Ardashir". The oldest known reference to the game is thought to be a passage in the Talmud, although some claim it refers to the Greek game Kubeia. Another early reference is to be found in the Middle Persian romance Chatrang-namak (written between the 7th and 9th centuries) which attributes the invention of the game to Bozorgmehr. The Shahnameh (written around the year 1000) also attributes the invention to Bozorgmehr. Parlett refers to Nard as "proto-Backgammon".

By the 17th century the game was played in Georgia and Azerbaijan under the name of nardi, and by the 19th century it was being played by the Kalmyks, who called it narr. During most part of the 20th century both Georgia and Kalmykia were parts of USSR, so now the game is played in Russia and other ex-USSR countries under the name of Nardy (нарды).

== Rules ==
=== Common rules ===
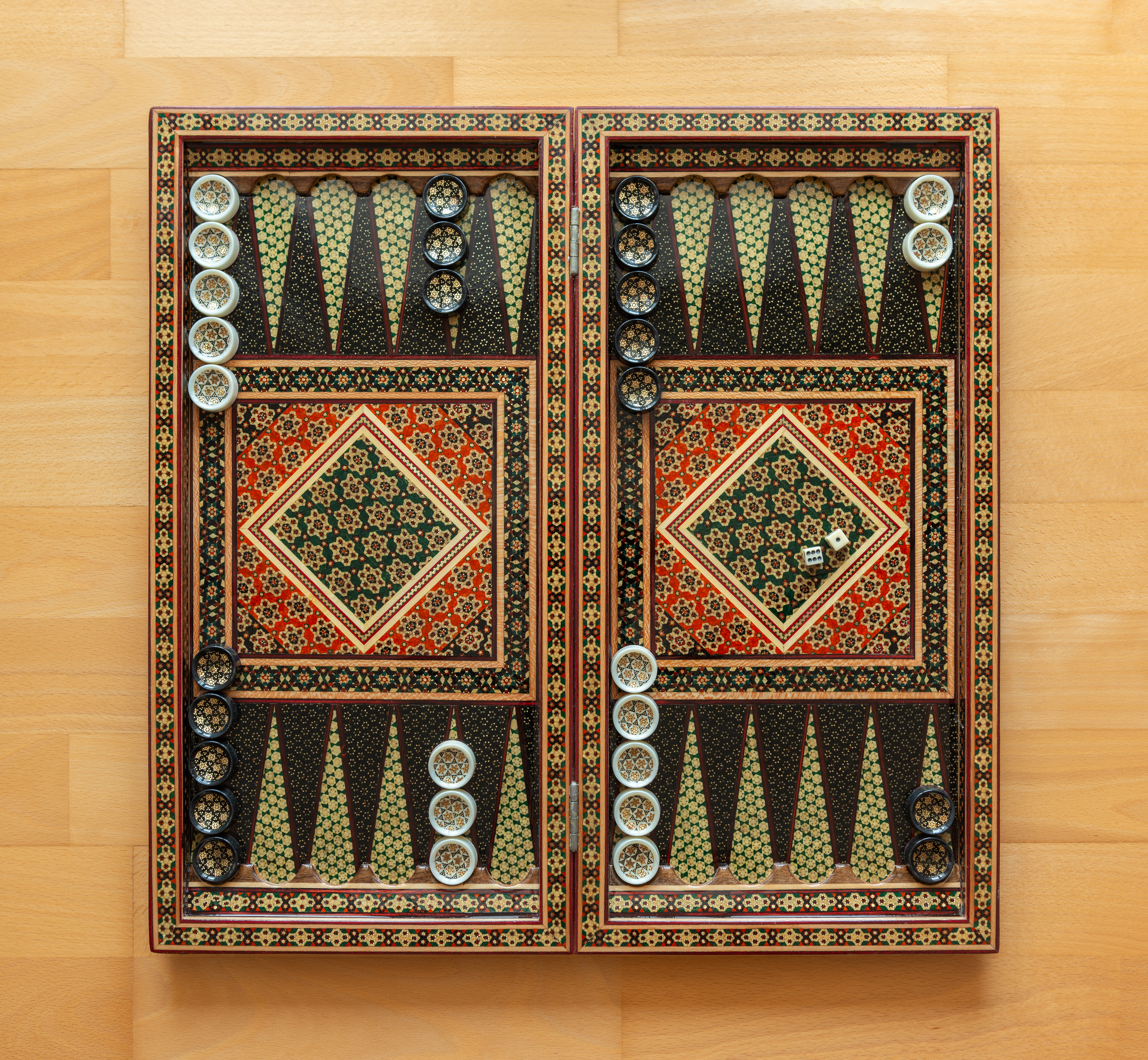
Persian Nard board made in Khatam technique.

The following rules apply to all the variants below:

- Players: the game is played by two players
- Equipment: Tables board of 24 points or spaces; 2 dice; 30 pieces or men of 2 different designs (15 per player)
- First play: both players throw a die to decide who plays first; the one with the higher die leads off
- Game turns: players takes turns at rolling both dice simultaneously
- Movement: players must always move their pieces forwards; which direction that is depends on the variant
- Moves:
  - Two men may be moved forward on each turn, the first by the score on one die and the second by the score of the other die
  - Alternatively one man may be moved forward based on the total dice score; but must rest on an intermediate point corresponding to the score on one of the dice
  - Points or spaces may be open or closed. A man may only be moved to an open one, the definition of which depends on the variant
- Bearing off:
  - Begins once all 15 pieces or men are in the final, or home, quadrant
  - One man is removed from the point corresponding to the roll of each die i.e. if a man is on the 3rd point from the end, a 3 must be rolled to bear it off
  - If there are no men on the point corresponding to a die roll, the player must make a legal move with a man further away
  - If that is not possible, a man is borne off from the furthest point that is occupied.

=== Nardshir ===
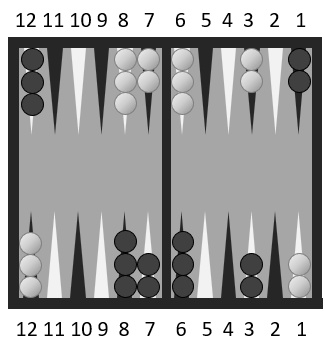
Nardshir - opening layout

The earliest description of the rules for Nard, known then as Nardshir, dates to a 6th century AD booklet by the Persian author, Bozorgmehr. These rules have been reconstructed as follows.

Players begin by setting up the board as shown. White is at the top and places on the home side, 3 men on the 6 and 8 points and 2 on the 3 and 7 points; on the opposing side he places 2 men on the Ace point and 3 on the 12 point. Black mirrors White's layout. Players move in opposite directions; White moves clockwise and Black, anticlockwise.

In turn, each player throws the dice and moves men as described above. A man may not rest or move onto a closed point i.e. one occupied by two or more opposing men; however, a single enemy man may be hit and removed from the board. (Note: Eli says it is moved to the bar, but this is a modern rule; in historical games men were usually just moved off the board.) Men so removed, must be re-entered before any men already on the board are played. They are re-entered into the first quadrant (points 1 to 6). Players must move their men if they can; if unable to make a legal move with one of the dice, however, they forfeit that die roll. If unable to use either die, they forfeit both and miss a go.

Once all 15 men have reached the 4th, or home, quadrant, the player may begin to bear them off the board and the first to do so is the winner.

=== Todas Tablas ===
In Alfonso X's 13th century book of games, El Libro de los Juegos, is a game called Todas Tablas, which many scholars equate to modern Backgammon although the description and opening layout are not the same. Some also equate it to Nard, thus assuming that Nard and Backgammon are the same game, a proposition challenged by Robet and others.

=== Nard ===
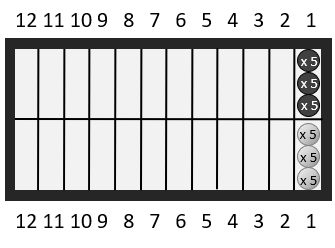
Nard - opening layout

A modern version of Nard as played in the Near East is described by Botermans. Robet suggests that this version could be closer to the original game than Todas Tablas. The following is an overview of the rules:

The board comprises 24 'spaces' in four quadrants or tables. Each player stacks 15 men on the space at the top right in the opponent's home table and rolls a die to decide who will start.

Players move their men in opposite directions. Rolling a doublet counts twice i.e. a double 3 means four pieces may move 3 spaces or one piece 12 spaces or any other combination of four 3s. The tablemen must always be moved to an open space (see below) and, in the event that one is moved by the total roll of the dice, the intermediate space must also be free. If a player cannot use either or both dice legally, the entire turn is forfeited.

A space is 'closed' if there are exactly two opposing men on it; otherwise it is 'open', even if there are three or more enemy on it. A single opposing man may be captured by moving a man to the same space. The 'captive' remains next to the rail on the outside of the board and its 'captor' is placed on the inside. (Note: Robet calls them the 'captured piece' and 'capturing piece' respectively.) The captive may not be moved until the captor moves away and the space is closed to the player whose man was captured. In moving pieces, players may jump over closed spaces.

Bearing off is as described above. If a series of games is being played, the winner may score for every enemy man left on the board as follows:

- 4th quadrant (inner table): 1 point
- 3rd quadrant (outer table): 2 points
- 2nd quadrant: 3 points
- 1st quadrant: 4 points.

=== Russian Nardy ===
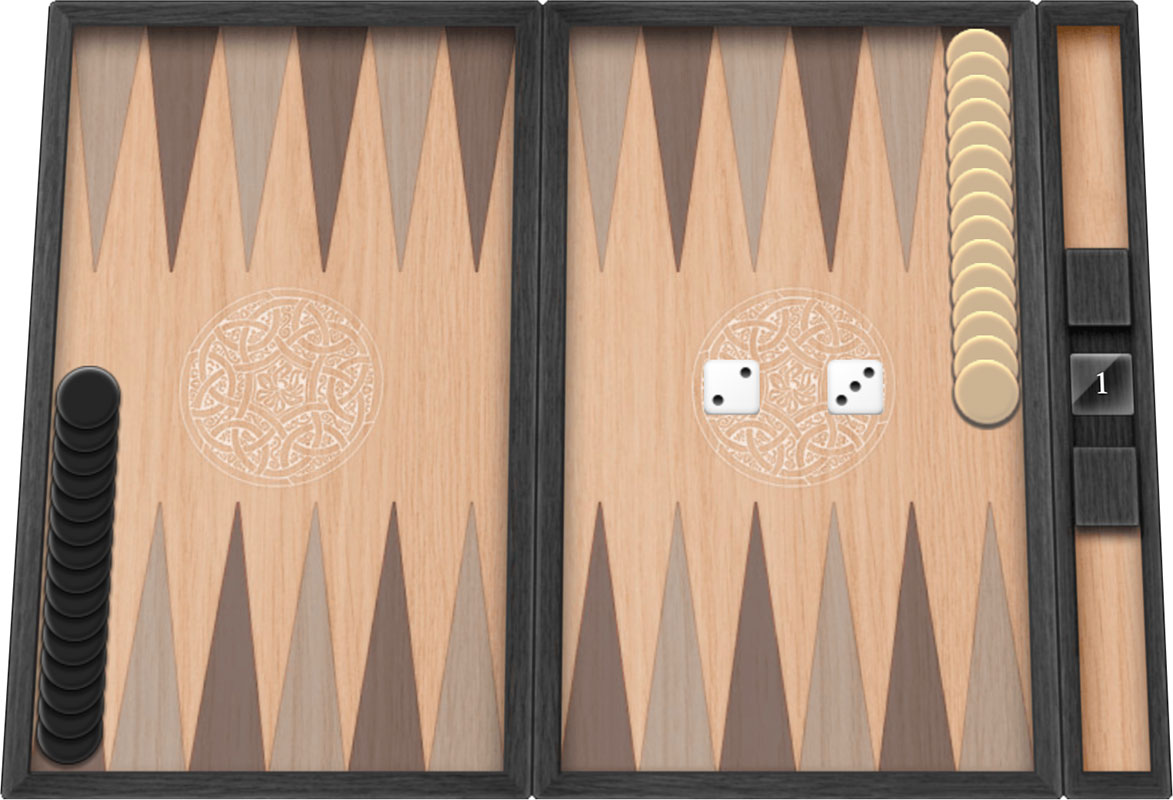
Long Nardy opening layout

Long Nardy, Nardy or Narde is the Russian variant of Nard. (Note: Short Nardy being the Russian name for Backgammon.) The starting layout is comparable to Nard above with all 15 pieces on the starting point or 'head' each player's top right. However, this time, players both move counterclockwise.

Players takes turns to roll the dice and move their pieces as before. A piece may only be moved to an open point i.e. one that is not occupied by any opposing pieces. If both dice are used to move one piece, the intermediate point on which the piece rests must also be open. Doublets count twice. Both dice must be used if possible; if only one can be used, the higher one must be played. There is no hitting and a prime may not be built in front of all the opposing pieces; at least one must be ahead of the prime.

There are special rules for moving pieces off the head: only one piece may be moved off the head per turn, except in the first turn when two pieces may be moved off the head. It is compulsory to move two off the head on the first go if a double 3, double 4 or double 6 is rolled.

Bearing off is as normal and the first player to bear off all pieces wins and scores 1 point. If this is achieved before the opponent bears any pieces off, the game scores double.

== Sources ==
- Rules of Narde
