= Laquet =

13th century Castilian tables game

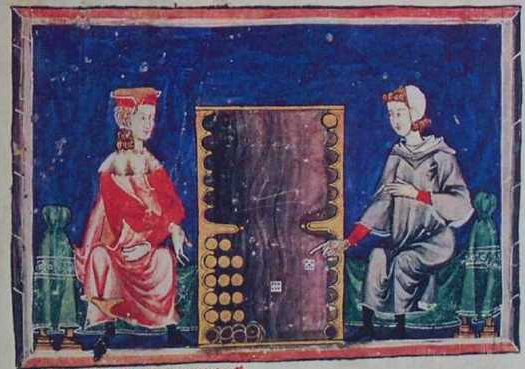
- Two ladies playing Laquet (Alfonso, 1283, f. 78v)
- Genres: Board game, race game, tables game
- Players: 2
- Movement: parallel
- Chance: Medium (dice rolling)
- Skills: Strategy, tactics, counting, probability

Related games
- Fevga • Jacquet • Moultezim

Laquet is an historical Castilian tables game that was described as a new game in the 13th century. It may be the ancestor of Jacquet. Unlike Backgammon and most other tables games, it has an asymmetrical starting position; only three of the four quadrants are used and the pieces may not be 'hit'.

== History ==
Laquet is described in the Libro de los Juegos, a game book written for King Alfonso of Castile between 1251 and 1283. It was described as being a "new game". It shares with the much later French game of Jacquet the ludeme, unusual for games of the tables family that an isolated hostile man may not be 'hit'. (Note: 'Hit' i.e. knocked off the board when the dice roll gives a player a move that ends on a point containing a single enemy man.) It may therefore be ancestral to Jacquet. Golladay translates the name of the game as "Quest."

== Equipment ==
The game was played on a tables board of 24 points (such as a Backgammon board) using 30 pieces or 'men' of two different colours, two dice and two dice cups.

== Starting position ==
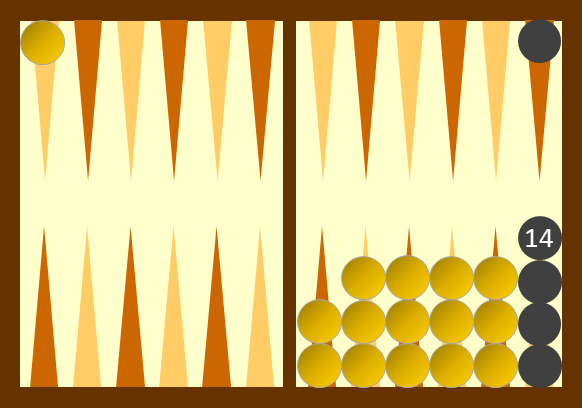
The starting position in Laquet. Black at the top.

Both players start in the first quadrant at the bottom right (see picture). The board is dressed asymmetrically as follows (see illustration) assuming Player A (white) is at the bottom and Player B (black) is at the top:

- Player A (white) places one man in the outer corner of the third quadrant, top left, and three on each point in the first quadrant with the exception of the leftmost, which only has two white men, and the rightmost which has none.
- Player B (black) places one man at the top right (his or her bottom left) and stacks the remainder on the vacant corner point in the first quadrant.

== Rules ==
The following rules are based on Alfonso (1251-1283) except where stated:

=== Aim ===
The aim of Laquet is to move all one's men to the third quadrant and be first to bear them all off.

=== Direction of march ===
Both players move their men anti-clockwise and white always leads. (Note: This is not specified in Libro de los Juegos, however Lalanne adjudges that any other direction of march gives one player a disproportionate advantage. Likewise black would have an advantage in having the lead, so Lalanne follows the rule from Cab e Quinal, a game with a similar starting position.)

=== Validity of the dice ===
The dice are good if they land within the board and on one face. If a die comes out of the board or lands on one of its rails it is invalid. If a die is cocked and players disagree on its validity or value, the player insisting it is good may place a test die on top and, if it stays in place, the die is good, otherwise it is invalid. If either die is invalid, both dice must be rethrown. (Note: These rules come from Trictrac.)

=== Movement ===
On each throw of the dice the player may:

- Move one man by the total pip count, resting on the intermediate point
- Move two men: one by the count on one die and the second man by the count on the other.

Doublets do not score double. A man may not be placed on a point occupied by an opposing man, nor rest on an intermediate point so occupied. If a die cannot be played by the thrower, the opponent may play it instead if able.

=== Bearing off ===
Once all fifteen men have entered the third (and, in this game, last) quadrant, the player may begin bearing them off. For this purpose:

- The rail counts as an additional point.
- A man that can reach the rail by the exact throw of a die may be borne off the board.
- Men may also be played within the exit quadrant if the die throw permits.
- If a die score is higher than the distance from a player's farthest man to the rail, that man may be borne off.

== Literature ==
- King Alfonso X (1251-1283). El Libro de los Juegos ["The Book of Games"].
