= Tawula =

Turkish tables game

Tawulah
- Other names: Turkish backgammon
- Genres: Board game, race game, tables game
- Players: 2
- Movement: parallel
- Chance: Medium (dice rolling)
- Skills: Strategy, tactics, counting, probability

Tawula is a historical tables game once popular in Asia Minor and Egypt. It is sometimes called Turkish backgammon in English; however, this is misleading, as there are fundamental differences; for example, both players move in the same direction in tawula, whereas in backgammon they move in opposing directions.

== History ==
The game is first described in English sources as Turkish backgammon by Falkener in 1892. He played the game in 1845. Very similar descriptions were posted by Murray in 1951 and Bell in 1988.

== Description ==
Table games are an ancient family of games, the best-known modern example of which is backgammon.

Tawula is quite different from Western backgammon in a number of respects. First, it is a game of parallel movement in which players both move in the same direction. Also, the starting layout is quite different with just two pieces on the board. There is no doubling cube, no double games, and a special rule about packing men on a point.

== Rules ==
The following rules are based on Bell (1988) except where stated:

Tawula is a game for two players using a standard tables board with 4 quadrants, 12 points on each side, and a pair of dice. There are 15 pieces per player, and the aim is to move them around the board anticlockwise to the home table and then be the first to bear off all one's pieces.

Players start with 2 pieces on their opponent's 1 point (the point in the far right-hand corner from where they are sitting). These cannot be moved until the remaining men have been entered onto the board, nor may there be more than two men on the starting point.

Players throw for the first move, and the one with the highest score plays the numbers on the dice thrown. The players then take turns alternately by throwing the two dice and using the score of each one separately either to enter a piece onto the entry table or to advance a piece already on the board. Doubles count double.

Blots may be hit and must be re-entered before a player moves any other piece. If this happens in a player's entry table, a point must be left free to enable re-entry if the right number is thrown.

Players may not double their pieces within their opponent's tables, except on the left-hand corner points–sometimes called the heads – and on the original starting points.

Bearing off may not begin until all 15 pieces have entered the home table. The first player to bear off all 15 pieces wins the game. There is no double game; however, if a player bears one man off while the opponent still has one piece to be entered or re-entered and the rest in the entry table, the first player wins capote, i.e. sevenfold. (Note: According to Murray the winner places a man in each of the 5- and 6-points on the same side regardless of seating position and then rolls for the first move of the next game. The logic of this is unclear and neither Bell nor Falkener mention it.)

== Literature ==
- Bell, R.C. (1988). Discovering Backgammon, 2nd edn. [1979] Haverfordwest: Shire.
- Falkener, Edward (1892). Games Ancient and Oriental, and How to Play Them. London: Longmans.
- Murray, H.J.R. (1951) A History of Board-Games other than Chess. Oxford: OUP.
- Sheehan, Sean and Yong Jui Lin (2014), Turkey: Third Edition. NY: Marshall Cavendish.
