= Running game =

Running game may refer to:

- Endless_runner, a type of video game.
- Running game (tables game), a tables game of parallel movement in which no hitting or pinning is permitted
