= Toccategli =

Toccategli is a historical Austrian board game of the Tables type, conjectured to have been introduced there from Spain or Italy before 1767. In its mature form, it was known to be played also in Sweden, Germany, and Denmark, at least between the mid-18th century and the mid-19th century.

In play, Toccategli is a game of contrary movement (like Backgammon and Trictrac) with virtual hitting (in the sense that hits score points, as in Trictrac). It differs from Trictrac, in all probability its closest relative, partly by being a race game at least as much as a point-scoring game; thus, several rules that check forward movement are relaxed, allowing tactics more similar to Backgammon (such as bearing off being more rule than exception). It differs still more by removing so-called "false hits" (called blind schlagen in German) from the scoring tariff, such that only hits that actually connect are scored.

== History and culture ==
In stark contrast to Trictrac, which has had a continuous (or nearly continuous) tradition of play and which teaches the rules by means of a small number of books treated as canonical, the rules of Toccategli are not known with absolute certainty. In fact, the first playable—though incomplete—Toccategli ruleset was given entirely in footnotes to a 1767 German translation of the Trictrac rules. In that work, Trictrac was implicitly considered the normative game, with Toccategli rules given as exceptions.
