= Fevga =

Greek tables game

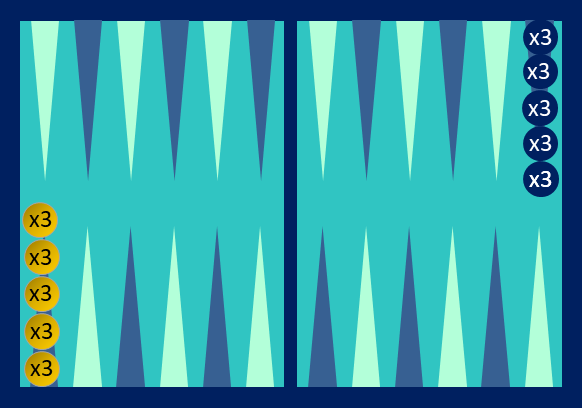
- The starting layout
- Other names: Turkey: Moultezim; Middle East: Tawla 31 or Maghribiyyah
- Genres: Board game, race game, tables game
- Players: 2
- Movement: parallel
- Chance: Medium (dice rolling)
- Skills: Strategy, tactics, counting, probability

Related games
- Jacquet • Narde

Fevga is a popular Greek tables game for two players. It is usually played as one of three different games in succession – the others being Portes and Plakoto – in social gatherings or coffee shops. When played in this way, it is known as Tavli. Very similar games, with slight variations, are Turkish Moultezim, Russian Narde and Egyptian and Lebanese Tawla 31 or Maghribiyyah.

== Overview ==
Fevga is a running game of parallel movement in which both players start in opposite corners of the board but then move in the same direction – anticlockwise – around it. Each player places all 15 pieces on the point in the far right corner of the board. the aim is to be first to bear off all one's pieces after first having gathered them in the home table.

== Rules ==
The following rules are based on Mamoun (2018):

=== Starting ===
Players roll one die each and the player with the higher number plays first, opening the game by rolling both dice. Players then play alternately and the winner of a game leads to the next.

=== Play ===
The player must play both numbers of the die roll separately if able. However, players may only move a piece onto an open point i.e. an empty point or one they already occupy. They may not move to a point occupied by an enemy man. In effect, one or more pieces on a point act as a block to the opponent. A player may use both dice throws to move one piece, but only if the intermediate point is open. A player who can only use one die, must use the higher number. Doublets are played twice i.e. as four separate die rolls.

To begin with each player must advance one man past the opposing start point before moving a second piece.

A player may form a prime anywhere except in the first quadrant or the opponent's first quadrant. One player A has assembled all 15 men on the point behind the prime, player B must unblock a point to enable A to advance. These prime rules are not enforced in all Greek regions.

A player must not completely block the opponent. In the rare situation where a player is unable to make a legal move to unblock the opponent, the opponent misses a turn and the player continues.

=== Bearing off ===
Bearing off may begin once all 15 men have reached the home table. A man may be borne off if a die roll corresponds to its distance from the edge of the board; failing that, a higher numbered piece may be removed; and failing that as well, the highest numbered piece is borne off.

=== Scoring ===
The first to bear all 15 pieces off the board wins and scores 1 point. If this is achieved before the loser has borne off any, the game is doubled.

== Backgammon comparison ==
Fevga differs markedly from Backgammon. The key differences are that:

- The starting layout is quite different - all pieces are piled on the starting point
- Both players move in the same direction
- There is no hitting
- A point is blocked by only one man
- Primes are more limited
- There is no doubling cube
- There is no equivalent of a backgammon bonus and associated triple win

== Moultezim ==
Parlett (1999) records that Moultezim is a form of the French game Jacquet still played in Turkey. Together with Fevga these three are not only games of parallel movement, but share the distinctive 'postilion' feature of Jacquet whereby the first piece must move around the board and pass a certain position before the remaining pieces may move. In Jacquet this is the first point of the home quadrant; in Fevga and Moultezim it is the opponent's starting point. The games also have the same feature that a single man may block a point to the opponent.

There are minor differences in Moultezim compared with Fevga. In Moultezim, players begin each game by rolling for first play and there is no limitation on primes. (Note: According to Moultezim at Backgammon Galore, which draws on several literary sources.)

== Literature ==
- Frantzis, Nicholas (1979). Seven Popular Games of Backgammon. Hicksville, NY: Exposition-Phoenix. ISBN 0682492957 [describes the game under Moultezim].
- Jacoby, Oswald and John R. Crawford (1970). The Backgammon Book. NY: Viking. p. 210 (Moultezim).
- Mamoun, Dr. John Sami (2018). Fevga or Moultezim Board Game Strategy. Millstone, NJ. ISBN 9781723972379
- Mamoun, J. (2018) Fevga or Moultezim. Internet Archive.
- Obolensky, Prince Alexis and Ted James (1969). Backgammon: The Action Game. London: Allen. p. 161. [Moultezim]
- Papahristou, Nikolaos (2015). Decision Making in Multiplayer Environments: Application in backgammon variants. Thessaloniki: University of Macedonia. Doctoral Studies Programme.
- Parlett, David (1999). The Oxford History of Board Games. Oxford: OUP.
- Tzannes, Nicolaos and Basil Tzannes (1977). Backgammon Games and Strategies.
