= Chasing the girls =

Icelandic board and dice game for two players

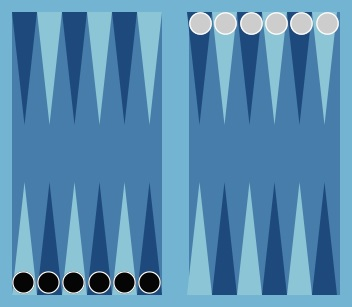
- The starting layout
- Other names: Að elta stelpur
- Genres: Board game; Tables game; Race game; Dice game
- Players: 2
- Movement: parallel, anticlockwise
- Setup time: 10–30 seconds
- Playing time: 5–60 minutes
- Chance: High (dice)

Chasing the girls (Að elta stelpur) is an Icelandic tables game of elimination in which hitting an opponent's checker results in eliminating it from the board.

== Rules ==
Only rolls of 1s, 6s, and doublets are played; all other dice rolls are ignored. Only double 6s are played twice, while all other doublets are played once.

No blocks or points can be formed, as only single checkers (blots) are allowed on any space. Hit blots are removed from the board, eliminated from play, and do not re-enter.

=== Corner-rattler ===
Once a player is reduced to only one remaining checker, that checker is referred to as a "corner-rattler" (hornaskella). The corner-rattler moves only on points 1, 6, 7, 12, 13, 18, 19, and 24.

- A roll of 1 moves the corner-rattler forward 1 point among these designated points.
- A roll of 6 moves it forward 2 points among these designated points.
- Double 1s move it forward 2 points.
- Double 6s move it forward 4 points.

If the player rolls doublets, they roll again. Furthermore, if the corner-rattler is located between two of the opponent's checkers, it cannot be hit.
