= Astronomical chess =

Chess variant

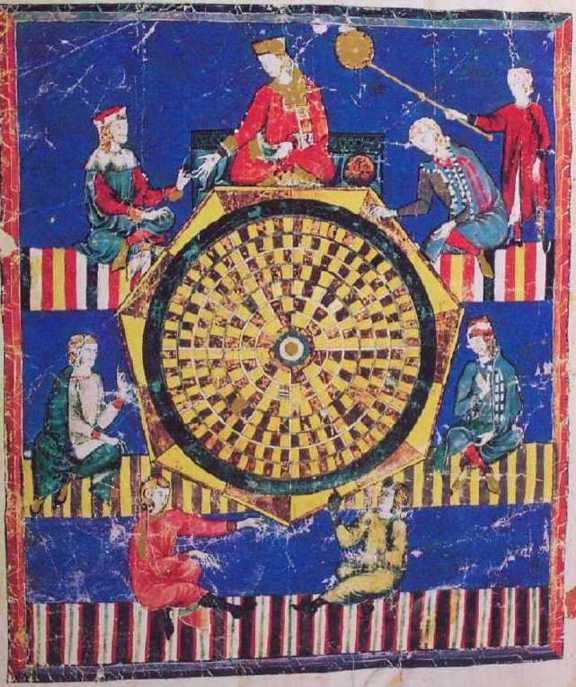
Astronomical chess in Libro de los Juegos

Astronomical chess or Astrological chess is a game for seven players from the book Libro de los Juegos (Book of Games), written under king Alfonso X the Wise in 1283. The game was played on a round board with concentric circles. The sky, zodiac signs and planets are the elements of this chess. The book described the games and problems of playing situations in chess, dice and other board games that formed the basis of modern backgammon.

In some sources astronomical chess is called the "Zodiac". Despite the name, the game is a dice game that has nothing to do with chess.

== Description ==
The board has seven sides for seven players; within, there are 12 concentric circles representing the geocentric model of the universe. Starting from the outside and moving inward, these represent:

Diagram of Escaques (Astronomical Chess) board

1. The stars, given by the 12 symbols of the zodiac
2. Saturn, with 84 (12×7) spaces of alternating color
3. Jupiter, with 72 (12×6) spaces
4. Mars, with 60 (12×5) spaces
5. The Sun, with 48 (12×4) spaces
6. Venus, with 36 (12×3) spaces
7. Mercury, with 24 (12×2) spaces
8. The Moon, with 12 (12×1) spaces
9. Earth: fire element as a single red ring
10. Earth: air element as a single purple ring
11. Earth: water element as a single white ring
12. Earth: earth element as a brown circle

The symbols of the zodiac are arranged according to a clock face, starting with Aries in the sector between the 11 o'clock and 12 o'clock positions, proceeding anti-clockwise to Pisces in the 12–1 o'clock sector. Each zodiac sector contains 28 spaces (1+2+3+4+5+6+7), making the board equivalent to a lunar calendar.

Each player is assigned a piece by rolling a seven-sided die; the piece personifies a different heavenly body, starting at a specific constellation within that orbit, as marked on the board:

1. The Moon, starting in Cancer (8–9 o'clock)
2. Mercury, starting in Virgo (6–7 o'clock)
3. Venus, starting in Taurus (10–11 o'clock)
4. The Sun, starting in Leo (7–8 o'clock)
5. Mars, starting in Scorpio (4–5 o'clock)
6. Jupiter, starting in Sagittarius (3–4 o'clock)
7. Saturn, starting in Aquarius (1–2 o'clock)

=== Gameplay ===
According to the source, players roll the seven-sided die to determine who moves first, then each rolls the seven-sided die again to determine the number of spaces they move, anti-clockwise, within their orbit. If the number of spaces moved results in the player staying within a zodiac sector, they do not win or lose any money. When they change sectors, depending on how closely they approach other sectors occupied by other players, the player may be required to pay or receive money from other player(s):

- Sextile: (another player is two zodiac sectors away, i.e., 1/6 of the 360° circle), player wins "two of twelve"
- Quadrature: (another player is three zodiac sectors away, i.e., 1/4 of 360°), player loses "three of twelve"
- Trine: (another player is four zodiac sectors away, i.e., 1/3 of 360°), player wins "three of twelve"
- Opposition: (another player is six zodiac sectors away, i.e., 1/2 of 360°), player loses "six of twelve"
- Conjunction: (another player is in the same zodiac sector), player loses "twelve of twelve"
