= Acey-deucey =

Game similar to backgammon

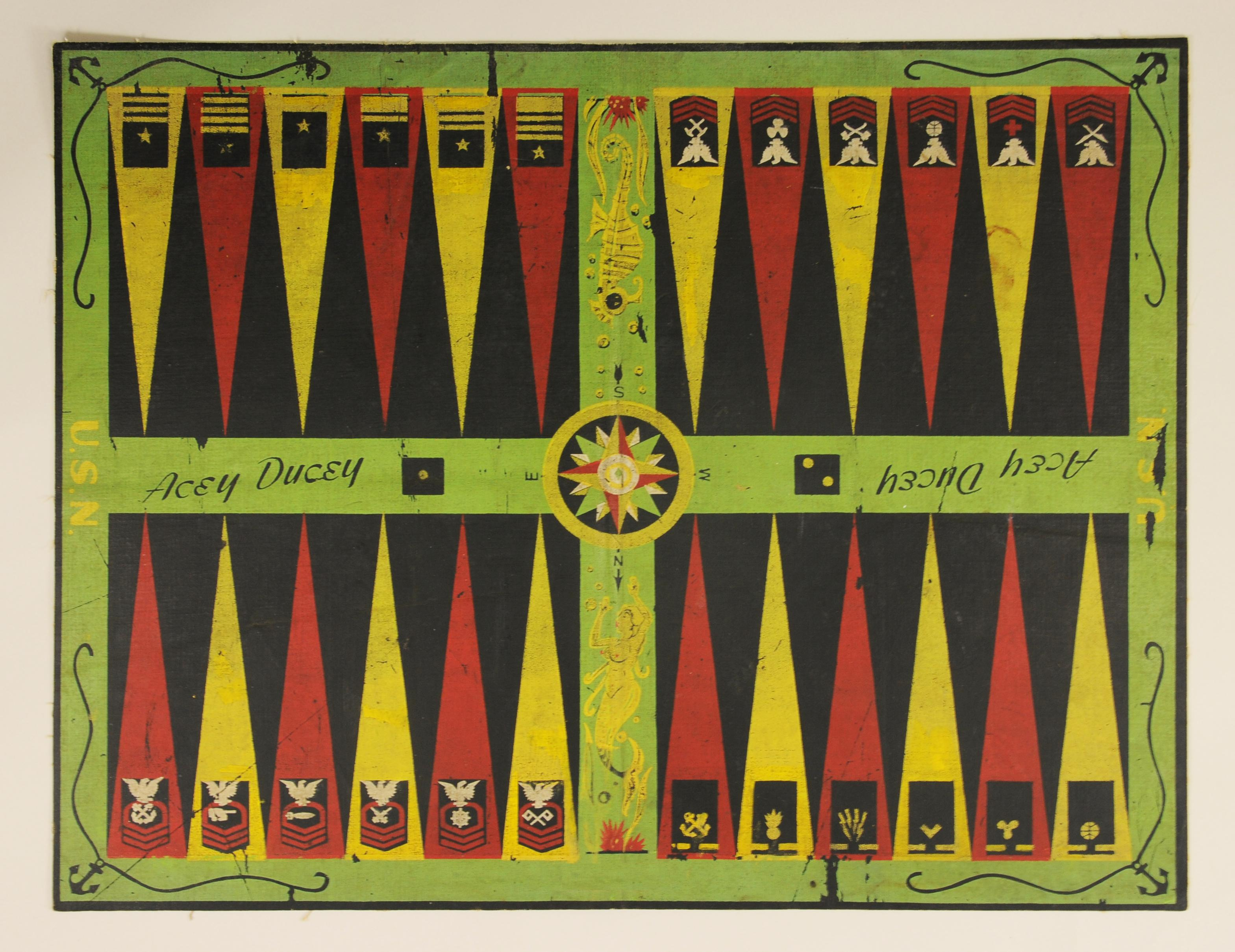
Acey-deucey of the first quarter of the twentieth century. This colorful acey-deucey board was printed on canvas and incorporates a seahorse, mermaid, compass rose, U.S. Navy Officer Rank Insignias and U.S. Navy Enlisted Rating Badges.

Acey-deucey is a table game, a family of board games that includes backgammon. Since World War I, it has been a favorite game of the United States Navy, Marine Corps, and Merchant Marine. Some evidence shows that it was played in the early 1900s aboard U.S. Navy ships. The game is believed to be rooted in the Middle East, Greece, or Turkey, where there were variants in which the game started with pieces off of the board.

Compared to standard backgammon, acey-deucey is more like a race than a strategy game. It features a differing starting position, opening play, and rules for the endgame. There is no doubling cube. Because pieces may be retained in one's opponent's home board, the game offers substantial opportunities for backgame play.

== Initial setup ==
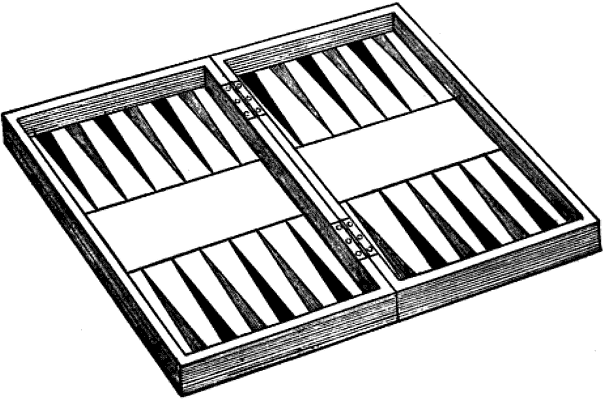
The opening position in acey-deucey is with no men on the board.

The equipment needed for acey-deucey comprises a tables board, 15 pieces per player, called men or stones, and two dice. All of both players' men are off the board when the game begins.

== Opening play ==
Men are entered onto the opponent's inner board – the 'entering table' or 'starting quarter' as if they were on the bar (known as the 'fence'). Once a man has been entered, it can be moved even though other men have not yet been entered. One strategy in the game is to keep one man, called "Oscar", off the board until it is needed for defensive purposes.

== Play ==
Play passes back and forth, with each player rolling both dice. Players use each die roll to move one man the corresponding number of points in the direction of the march. A player may use both rolls for one man, as long as both the intermediate point and destination point are not occupied by two or more enemy men. A man may move to a vacant point or one with men of the same colour. They may also move to a point occupied by one enemy man and 'kick' the man off the board. The kicked man must be re-entered.

A player who rolls doublets may move a total of four times, each move traversing as many spaces as the rolled amount (two fives rolled result in four moves of five points each). After rolling these doublets, the player takes another turn.

If a player rolls an acey-deucey (= a 1 and a 2, also called an Ace and a Deuce), he plays the 1-and-2; then they choose any number from 1 to 6 and act as if they had just thrown a doublet of it; then that player takes another turn.

After the opening, the rules of play are as follows:

1. After rolling and playing doubles or acey-deucey, the player must roll and move again.
2. A roll of acey-deucey counts as a 1-2, and as doubles of the player's choice.
3. Upon reaching one's own home board, also called the 'finishing quarter', a man may not be moved again until all the rest have arrived.
4. An exact roll is required to bear off.
5. A player can move men even if he has men on the fence.

== Terminology ==
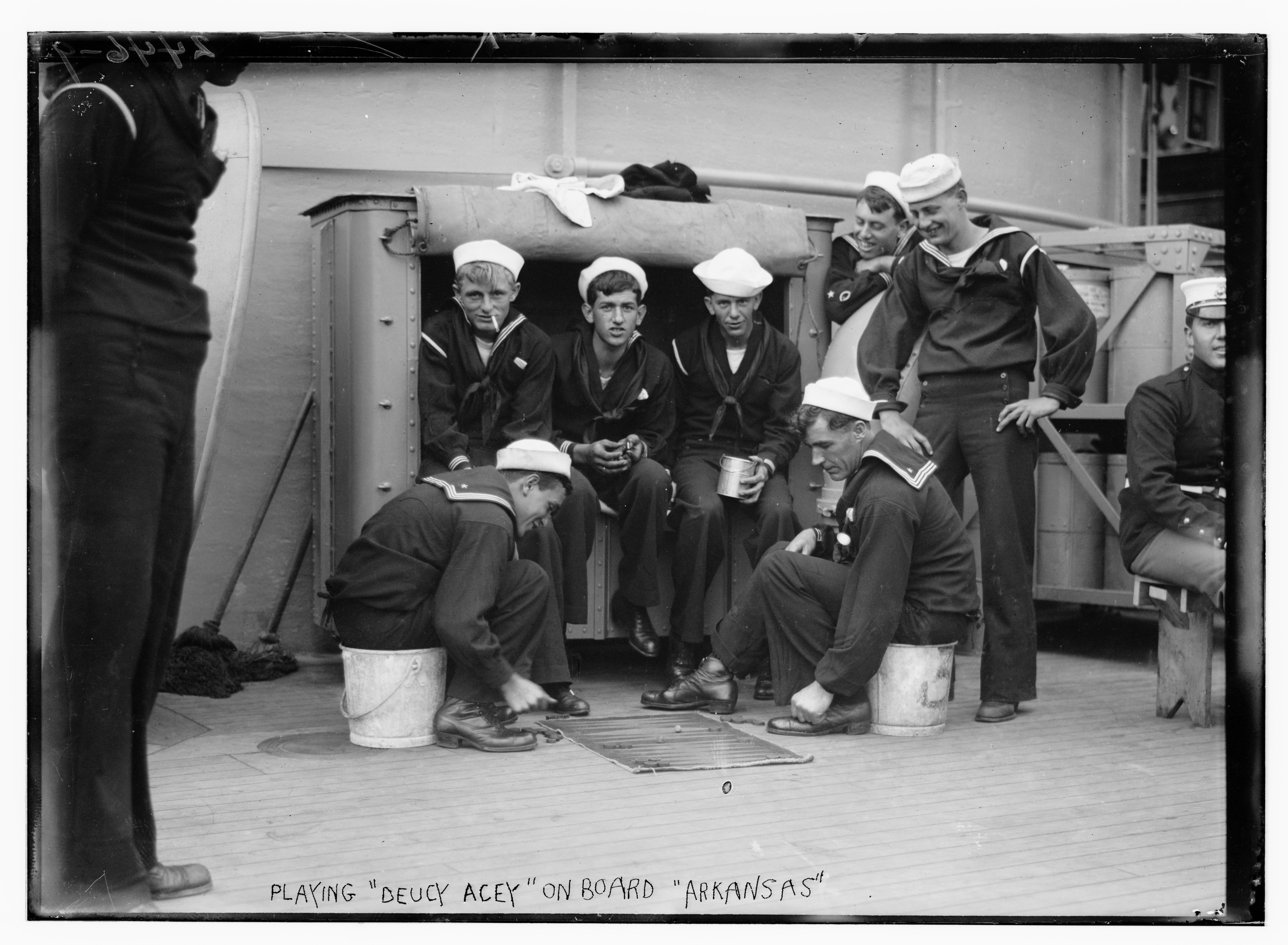
Playing acey-deucy on the USS Arkansas (BB-33)

The initial rolling of one die is called the peewee or piddle. The bar is the fence, and a single man is kicked rather than hit. The opponent's inner table is called the entering table or starting quarter, and one's own inner table is the finishing quarter.

== Variants ==
Variants of the above rules exist that make the game more restrictive:

1. Upon rolling acey-deucey, the player does not choose doublets for their next move. Instead, they roll one die and use that number for the doublet choice.
2. If a player rolls acey-deucey but is unable to utilize both the 1 and 2 (most likely because he is blocked), their turn ends. They do not get a doublet, and they do not get another roll.
3. If a player rolls doublets but is unable to utilize all 4 moves (most likely because they are blocked), their turn ends. They do not get another roll. This rule also holds for doublets following an acey-deucey.
4. Men may be freely moved inside one's home (bear-off) area until all other men have arrived. This is the opposite from the description above.
5. Once all men have arrived in the player's home area, they may not move any more.
6. Players may only bear off men that exactly match the die roll. For instance, if the 6 and 5 points are open and the player rolls a 6-5, they may not use that roll to bear off a man from the 4-point.
7. Men may be only moved from the fence upon rolling doublets.
8. The ability to take extra rolls for doublets and acey-deucey during bearing off have the same rules stated above. If a player rolls an acey-deucey but cannot bear a man off from both the 1-point and the 2-point, that player is not entitled to a roll for doublets or another turn.
9. If a player rolls a 6-6 and only has three men on the 6-point to bear off, that player may not take another turn (although he or she can bear off the three men from that point).
10. At the beginning of the game, no man may be put into play unless a doublet is rolled. In other words, a player may not enter a man without first rolling a doublet. After the initial doublet, any man may be entered as desired.

== In popular culture ==
Acey-deucey is often mentioned in the book series The Corps by W.E.B. Griffin which is set in the Pacific Theater of World War II, and follows the lives of a group of marines in special service. Griffin never explains the game in the slightest, but his characters are often playing it when they are interrupted by the war, i.e. required to stop playing to perform some duty. The game is also mentioned in the 1957 WW 2 drama "The Enemy Below".
