= Libro de los juegos =

13th-century Spanish chess treatise

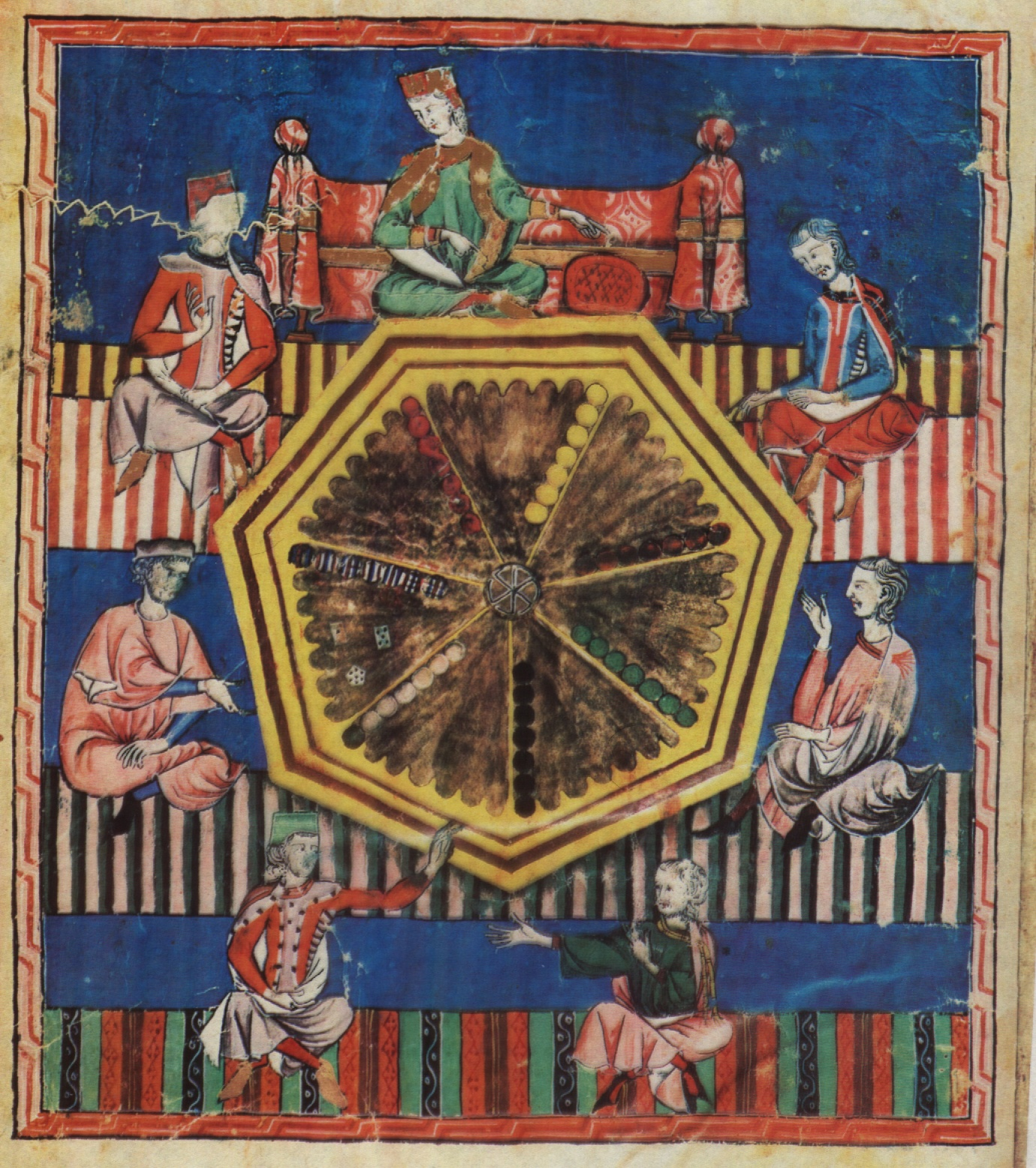
The game of astronomical tables, from Libro de los juegos

The Libro de los juegos (Spanish: "Book of games"), or Libro de axedrez, dados e tablas ("Book of chess, dice and tables", in Old Spanish), is a 13th-century Spanish treatise on chess that synthesizes the information from Arabic works on this same topic, dice and tables (backgammon forebears) games, commissioned by Alfonso X of Castile, Galicia and León and completed in his scriptorium in Toledo in 1283. It contains the earliest European treatise on chess as well as being the oldest document on European tables games, and is an exemplary piece of the literary legacy of the Toledo School of Translators.

== Significance ==
The Libro de los juegos is one of the most important documents for researching the history of board games. This "celebrated MS book of games" has been described as "one of the choicest treasures of the library of the Escorial" as well as "perhaps the greatest source of information on board games ever compiled during the Middle Ages." It is both "the earliest treatise on chess and the oldest document relating to tables which have had their origin in Europe."

== Description ==
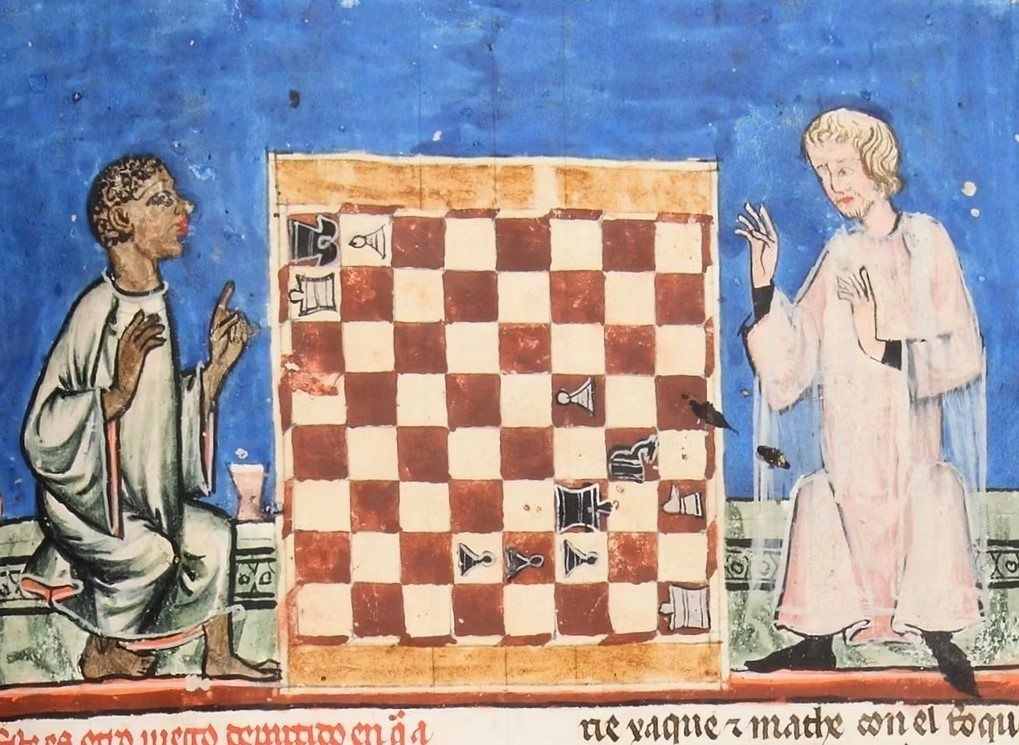
A black man and a white man playing chess

The book consists of ninety-seven leaves of parchment, many with color illustrations, and contains 150 miniatures. The text is a treatise that addresses the playing of three game types: a game of skill, or chess; games of chance, or dice; and a third game type, tables, which combines elements of both skill and chance. These games are discussed in the final section of the book at both an astronomical and astrological level. Examining further, the text can also be read as an allegorical initiation tale and as a metaphysical guide for leading a balanced, prudent, and virtuous life. In addition to the didactic, although not overly moralistic, aspect of the text, the manuscript's illustrations reveal a rich cultural, social, and religious complexity.

== Location ==
The earliest manuscript is in the library of the monastery of El Escorial near Madrid in Spain, as manuscript T.I.6. It is bound in sheepskin and is 40 cm high and 28 cm wide (16 in × 11 in). A 1334 copy is held in the library of the Spanish Royal Academy of History in Madrid.

== Background ==
Alfonso was likely influenced by his contact with scholars in the Arab world. Unlike many contemporary texts on the topic, he does not engage the games in the text with moralistic arguments; instead, he portrays them in an astrological context. He conceives of gaming as a dichotomy between the intellect and chance. The book is divided into three parts reflecting this: the first on chess (a game purely of abstract strategy), the second on dice (with outcomes controlled strictly by chance), and the last on tables (combining elements of both). The first section of the book also speaks of some other games of abstract strategy, notably alquerque and nine men's morris, among others. The text may have been influenced by Frederick II's text on falconry.

== Chess ==
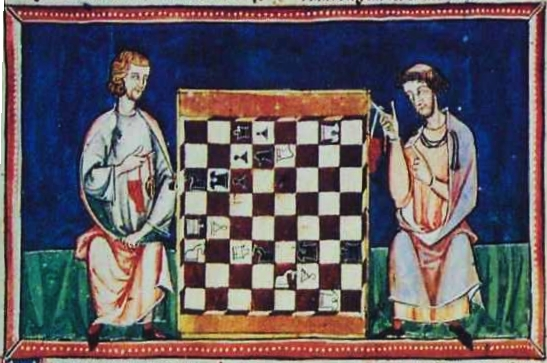
Chess problem #35

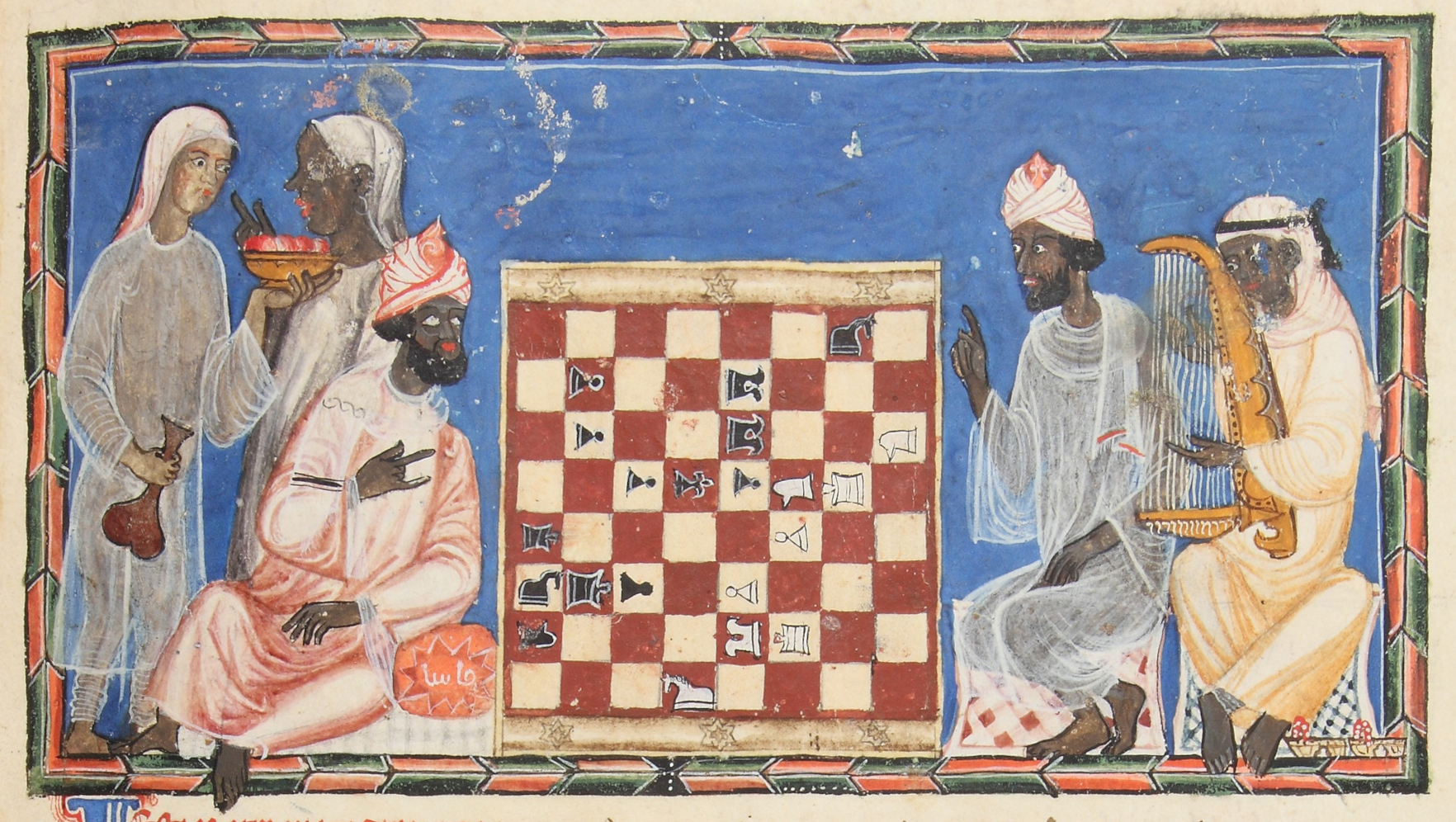
Two North African men solving chess problem #25

The Libro de los Juegos contains an extensive collection of writings on chess, with over 100 chess problems and variants. Among its more notable entries is a depiction of what Alfonso calls the ajedrex de los quatro tiempos ("chess of the four seasons"). This game is a chess variant for four players, described as representing a conflict between the four elements and the four humors. The chessmen are marked correspondingly in green, red, black, and white, and pieces are moved according to the roll of dice. Alfonso also describes a game titled "astronomical chess", played on a board of seven concentric circles, divided radially into twelve areas, each associated with a constellation of the Zodiac.

Another variant described in the book is the "Grant Acedrex", played over a 12x12 board with alternative pieces as the giraffe and the unicornio.

== Tables ==
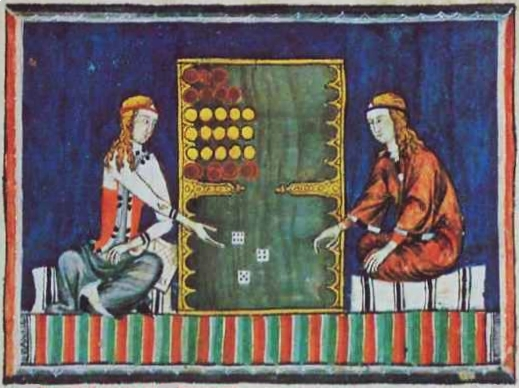
Seis, dos, y as

The book describes the rules for a number of games in the tables family. One notable entry is todas tablas, the equivalent of the Anglo-Scottish game of Irish, which some scholars have argued has several similarities to modern backgammon including an identical starting position and the same rules for movement and bearing off, albeit the accompanying image has a different opening layout. Alfonso also describes a variant played on a board with seven points in each table. Players rolled seven-sided dice to determine the movement of pieces, an example of Alfonso's preference for the number seven.

The tables games described are:

Spanish name	Translation	Remarks
Quinze Tablas	Fifteen Pieces	
Doce Canes, Doce Hermanos	Twelve Dogs, Twelve Brothers	
Doblet	Doublet	Related to the English game of Doublets
Fallas	Drop Dead	Related to the English game of Fayles
Seys Does e As	Six, Two and Ace	Related to the English game of Six-Ace
Emperador	Emperor	
Medio-Emperador	Half Emperor	
Paireia de Entrada	Paired Entry	
Cab e Quinal	Alongside Fives	
Todas Tablas	All Pieces	Related to the Anglo-Scottish game of Irish
Laquet		Related to the French game of Jacquet
Buffa Cortesa	Courtly Puff	Related to the German game of Puff
Buffa de Baldrac	Common Puff	
Rencontrat		

== Art ==
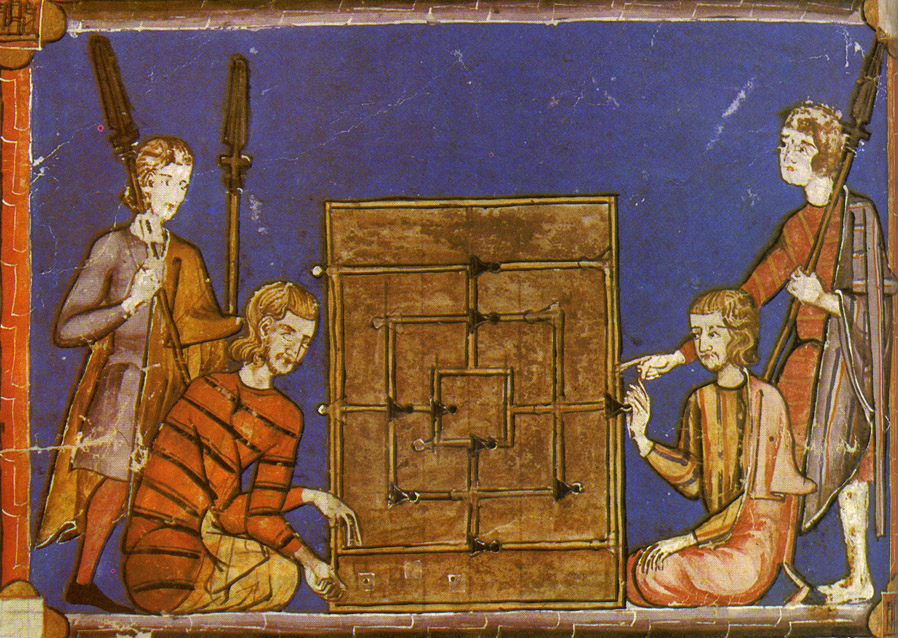
A 13th-century illustration in Libro de los Juegos of Nine men's morris being played with dice

The miniatures in the Libro de juegos vary between half- and full-page illustrations. The half-page miniatures typically occupy the upper half of a folio, with text explaining the game "problem" solved in the image occupying the bottom half. The back or second (verso) side of Folio 1, in a half-page illustration, depicts the initial stages of the creation of the Libro de juegos, accompanied by text on the bottom half of the page, and the front or first (recto) side of Folio 2 depicts the transmission of the game of chess from an Indian Philosopher-King to three followers. The full-page illustrations are almost exclusively on the verso side of later folios and are faced by accompanying text on the recto side of the following folio. The significance of the change in miniature size and placement may indicate images of special emphasis, could merely function as a narrative or didactic technique, or could indicate different artisans at work in Alfonso's scriptorium as the project developed over time.

Having multiple artisans working on the Libro de juegos would have been a typical practice for medieval chanceries and scriptoria, where the labor of producing a manuscript was divided amongst individuals of varying capacities, for example the positions of scribe, draftsman, and apprentice cutting pages. But in addition to performing different tasks, various artisans could have labored at the same job, such as the work of illustration in the Libro de juegos, thereby revealing a variety of hands or styles. The Libro de Juegos offers such evidence in the difference in size between the half- and full-page illustrations in addition to changes in framing techniques amongst the folios: geometrical frames with embellished corners, architectural frames established by loosely perspectival rooftops and colonnades, and games played under tents. Other stylistic variances are found in figural representation, in facial types, and in a repertoire of different postures assumed by the players in different folios in the manuscript.

For example, in a comparison of two miniatures, found on Folios 53v and 76r, examples of these different styles are apparent, although the trope of a pair of gamers is maintained. In Folio 53v, two men are playing chess, both wearing turbans and robes. Although they may be seated on rugs on the ground, as suggested by the ceramic containers that are placed on or front of the rug near the man on the right side of the board, the figures' seated positions, which are full frontal with knees bent at right angles, suggests that they are seated on stools or perhaps upholstered benches. The figures' robes display a Byzantine conservatism, with their modeled three-dimensionality and allusion to a Classical style, yet the iconic hand gestures are reminiscent of a Romanesque energy and theatricality. Although the figures are seated with their knees and torsos facing front, their shoulders and heads rotate in three-quarter profile toward the center of the page, the chess board, and each other. The proximal, inner arm of each player (the arm that is closest to the board) is raised in a speaking gesture; the distal, outside arms of the players are also raised and are bent at the elbows, creating a partial crossing of each player's torso as the hands lift in speaking gestures. The faces reveal a striking specificity of subtle detail, particular to a limited number of miniatures throughout the Libro de juegos, perhaps indicative of a particular artist's hand. These details include full cheeks, realistic wrinkles around the eyes and across the brow, and a red, full-lipped mouth that hints at the Gothic affectations in figural representation coming out of France during the late twelfth and early thirteenth centuries.

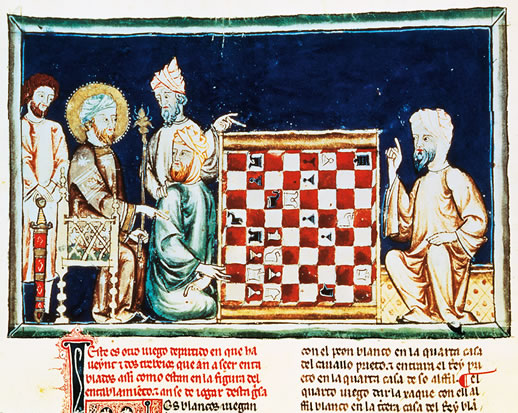
Moors from Andalusia playing chess

The style in the miniature in Folio 76v is markedly different from the style in Folio 53v. In this case, the framed miniature contains two men, perhaps Spanish, with uncovered wavy light brown hair that falls to the jaw line. The men seem young, as the player on the left has no facial hair and his face is unlined. In both folios, both pairs of players are playing tables and seem to be well-dressed, although there is no addition of gold detailing to their robes as seen in the wardrobes of aristocratic players in other miniatures. These players are seated on the ground, leaning on pillows that are placed next to a tables board. In this miniature, the figure on the left side of the board faces the reader, while the figure on the right leans in to the board with his back to the reader. In other words, each player is leaning on his left elbow, using his right hand to reach across his body to play. In the miniatures of this style, the emphasis seems to be more on the posture of the player than the detail of their faces; this crossed, lounging style is only found in the folios of the Libro de tablas, the third section of the Libro de juegos which explains tables games, again perhaps indicative of the work of a particular artist.

Other visual details contemporaneous of Alfonso's court and social and cultural milieu infuse the Libro de juegos. Although some of the miniatures are framed by simple rectangles with corners embellished by the golden castles and lions of Castile and León, other are framed by medieval Spanish architectural motifs, including Gothic and Mudéjar arcades of columns and arches. At times, the figural depictions are hierarchical, especially in scenes with representations of Alfonso, where the king is seated on a raised throne while dictating to scribes or meting out punishments to gamblers. Yet a contemporary atmosphere of Spanish convivencia is evoked by the inclusion nobility, rogues, vagrants, young and old, men, women, Christian, Muslim, and Jewish characters. Alfonso himself is depicted throughout the text, both as participant and spectator and as an older man and as a younger. The pages are filled with many social classes and ethnicities in various stages of solving the challenges presented by games.

== Iconography ==
The Libro de los Juegos can be divided into three parts: the games and problems it explores textually, the actual illuminations themselves, and the metaphysical allegories, where an analysis of the texts and illuminations reveals the movements of the macrocosmos of the universe and the microcosmos of man. The symbolism within the medieval illuminations, as explained by the accompanying texts, reveal allusions to medieval literature, art, science, law and philosophy. Intended as a didactic text, the manuscript functions as a manual that documents and explains how and why one plays games ranging from pure, intellectual strategy (chess), to games of pure chance (dice), to games that incorporate both elements (tables). Conceivably, Alfonso hoped to elucidate for himself how to better play the game of life, while also providing a teaching tool for others. The game of ajedrex, or chess, is not the only game explained in the Libro de los Juegos, but it does occupy the primary position in the text and is given the most attention to detail.

In the thirteenth century, chess had been played in Europe for almost two hundred years, having been introduced into Europe by Arabs around the year 1000. The Arabs had become familiar with the game as early as the eighth century when the Islamic empire conquered Persia, where the game of chess was alleged to have been originated. It is said that a royal advisor had invented the game in order to teach his king prudence without having to overtly correct him. As Arab contact with the West expanded, so too did the game and its various permutations, and by the twelfth century, chess was becoming an entertaining diversion among a growing population of Europeans, including some scholars, clergy, the aristocracy, and the merchant classes; thus, by the thirteenth century, the iconography and symbolism associated with chess would have been accessible and familiar to Alfonso and his literate court culture, who may have had access to the private library, and manuscripts, of Alfonso, including the Libro de los Juegos.

The Libro de los Juegos manuscript was a Castilian translation of Arabic texts, which were themselves translations of Persian manuscripts. The visual trope portrayed in the Libro de los Juegos miniatures is seen in other European transcriptions of the Arabic translations, most notably the German Carmina Burana Manuscript: two figures, one on either side of the board, with the board tilted up to reveal to the readers the moves made by the players. The juxtaposition of chess and dice in Arabic tradition, indicating the opposing values of skill (chess) and ignorance (dice), was given a different spin in Alfonso's manuscript, however. As Alfonso elucidates in the opening section of the Libro de los Juegos, the Libro de ajedrex (Book of chess) demonstrates the value of the intellect, the Libro de los dados (Book of dice) illustrates that chance has supremacy over pure intellect, and the Libro de las tablas (Book of tables) celebrates a conjoined use of both intellect and chance. Further, the iconographic linkage between chess and kingship in the Western tradition continued to evolve and became symbolic of kingly virtues, including skill, prudence, and intelligence.

== Literary context ==
Most of the work accomplished in Alfonso's scriptorium consisted of translations into the Spanish vernacular from Arabic translations of Greek texts or classical Jewish medicinal texts. As a result, very few original works were produced by this scholar-king, relative to the huge amount of work that was translated under his auspices. This enormous focus on translation was perhaps an attempt by Alfonso to continue the legacy of academic openness in Castile, initiated by Islamic rulers in Córdoba, where the emirates had also employed armies of translators in order to fill their libraries with Arabic translations of classic Greek texts. Alfonso was successful in promoting Castilian society and culture through his emphasis on the use of Galaico-Portuguese and Castilian, in academic, juridical, diplomatic, literary, and historical works. This emphasis also had the effect of reducing the universality of his translated works and original academic writings, as Latin was the lingua franca in both Iberia and Europe; yet Alfonso never desisted in his promotion of the Castilian vernacular.

== Legacy ==
In 1217, Alfonso had captured the Kingdom of Murcia, on the Mediterranean coast south of Valencia, for his father, King Alfonso IX, thereby unifying the kingdoms of Castile and León, bringing together the northern half of the Iberian Peninsula under one Christian throne. With the Christian Reconquista of the Peninsula underway, inroads into Islamic territories were successfully incorporating lands previously held by the taifa kingdoms. The arts and sciences prospered in the Kingdom of Castile under the confluence of Latin and Arabic traditions of academic curiosity as Alfonso sponsored scholars, translators, and artists of all three religions of the Book (Jewish, Christian, and Muslim) in his chanceries and scriptoria. Clerical and secular scholars from Europe turned their eyes to the Iberian Peninsula as the arts and sciences prospered in an early Spanish "renaissance" under the patronage of Alfonso X, who was continuing the tradition of (relatively) enlightened and tolerant convivencia established by the Muslim emirate several centuries earlier.

The Libro de los Juegos was produced under the influence of both the Arabic and Latin schools of thought. It is characterized by the interrelation between religion and science that existed during the thirteenth century. It includes the artistic illumination and scholarship in medieval games.

== See also ==
- Literature of Alfonso X
- Astronomical chess
- Scachs d'amor
