= Long Nardy =

Board game

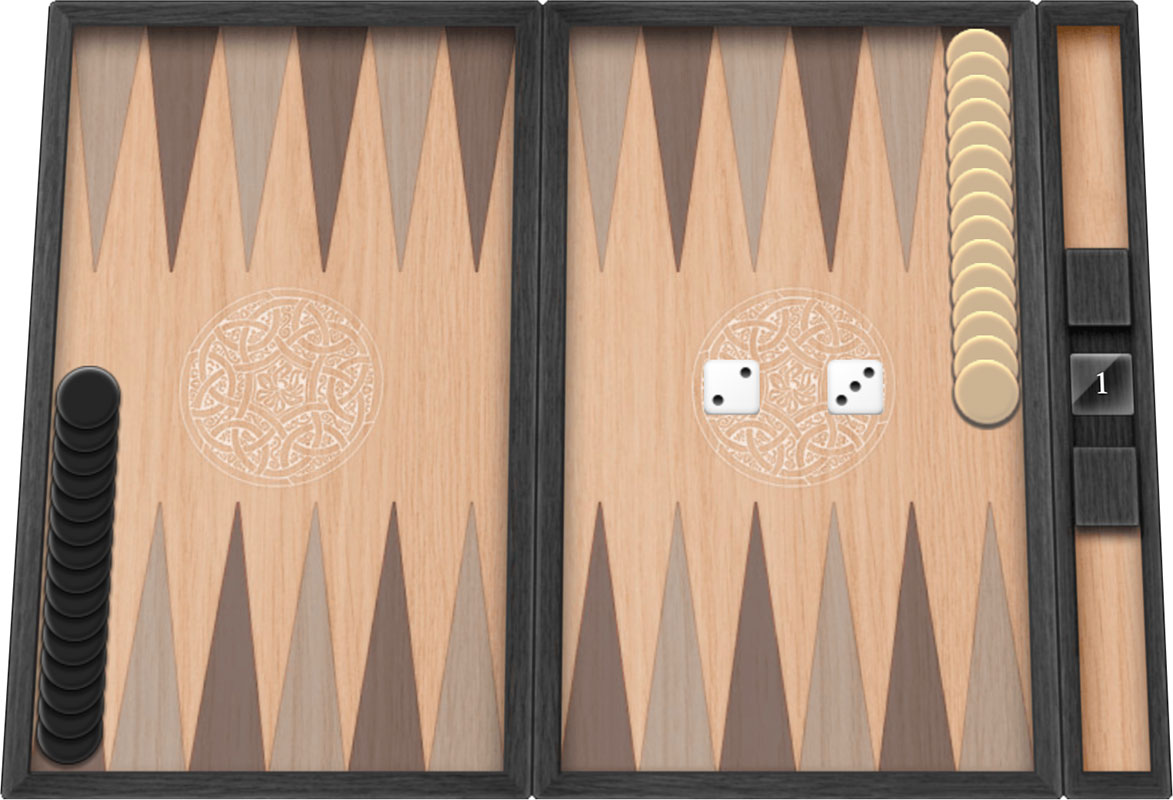
- Opening layout
- Other names: Nardy, Nardi, Long Narde
- Genres: Board game
- Players: 2
- Movement: Parallel, anticlockwise
- Setup time: 10–30 sec
- Playing time: 7–30 min
- Chance: Medium (dice rolling)
- Age range: 5+
- Skills: Strategy, Tactics, counting
- Materials required: Tables board, 15 white and 15 black pieces, two dice

Long Nardy, also known as Nardy or Nardi, is a two-player tables game likely derived from the ancient Persian game Nardshir. Over centuries, it spread widely throughout the Middle East and Central Asia and is now especially popular in countries such as Russia, Georgia, Azerbaijan and Armenia. It is played on a tables board using 15 pieces per player and two dice.

== Name ==
The game is usually just called "Nardy" or "Nardi" in Russian-speaking regions but referred to as "Long Nardy" to distinguish it from backgammon, which is called "Short Nardy" in Russian. English sources sometimes mistranslate Nardy as backgammon, leading to the incorrect term "Long backgammon". However, the rules and gameplay of Long Nardy differ significantly. For instance, both players move in the same direction in Long Nardy, unlike in backgammon.

== Rules ==
The game is played by two people on a standard tables board divided into two halves. Each player has 15 pieces (also called "men"), usually black and white, and rolls two dice per turn. Players take turns moving their pieces based on the outcome of the dice roll.

=== Setup ===
Each player places all 15 of their pieces on the rightmost point in their opponent’s home board — a position known as the "head". The initial player is determined by both rolling a die; the player with the higher number becomes White and starts the game. Dice are rolled using a leather cup, and both must land flat on one half of the board.

=== Movement ===
Players move their pieces anticlockwise, either by moving two different pieces based on the two dice rolls or one piece using both numbers. A point already occupied by one or more of the opponent's pieces is blocked. If a player rolls a double (e.g., 4–4), they must play four moves using the value of the die.

Only one piece can be moved from the head in a single turn (except in specific first-move exceptions). If legal moves exist, the player must make them, even if it's disadvantageous. If no move is possible, the player forfeits the turn.

=== Direction of travel ===
Unlike Backgammon and Short Nardy, both players in Long Nardy move in the same direction — anticlockwise — around the board. Other key differences include:

- All pieces start on the head.
- Hitting opponent's pieces is not allowed.
- A piece cannot land on a point occupied by any opponent piece.
- Forming a six-point "prime" (block) is a strategic goal but cannot fully lock the opponent.

=== Blocking ("prime") ===
A player may create a row of six consecutive points occupied by their own pieces (a "prime") to block the opponent. However, it is illegal to trap all 15 opposing pieces; at least one must be beyond the prime. If no legal move is possible due to a block, the opponent loses their turn.

=== Bearing off ===
Once all 15 pieces have entered the player's home quadrant (the last six points of travel), they may begin bearing off. Bearing off involves removing pieces from the board according to the dice roll. If the point corresponding to the die roll is empty, the player may bear off from the next lower occupied point.

=== Scoring ===
There are typically two possible outcomes:

- Oyn (1 point): The winner bears off all 15 pieces, and the opponent bears off at least one.
- Mars (2 points): The winner bears off all pieces while the opponent has borne off none.

Some informal sources mention Coke (3 points) and Home Mars (4 points), but these are not part of official or tournament rules.

Modern tournament rules, as per the Nard Federation (Федерация Нард), introduce the possibility of a draw: if the second player (Black) manages to bear off all pieces in the final turn after White has already done so, the game is drawn and points may be split depending on tournament regulations.

== See also ==
- Nard (game)
- Short Nardy (Backgammon)

== Literature ==
- Yu. N. Amelin, M. Yu. Amelin (2000). Всё о нардах ("All about Nardy"). Домашняя энциклопедия ("Home Encyclopedia"). Vol. Длинные нарды (Long Nardy). Rostov-on-Don: Phoenix. pp. 83–106, 128. ISBN 5-222-01488-6.
- Akhundov N. (2012). Справочник по длинным нардам. Теория и практика игры ("Handbook on Long Nardy. Game Theory and Practice"). p. 136.
- I. Yu. Fadeev (2011). Нарды — игра тысячелетий. Самоучитель. Правила. Сборник игр. ("Nardy - the Game of Millennia. Tutorial. Rules. Collection of Games. Glossary."). Perm: Phoenix.
- Chebotarev R. (2010). Длинные нарды ("Long Nardy"). Dnipropetrovsk: Balance Business Books. p. 256. ISBN 978-966-415-008-5.
