= Jacquet (game) =

French board game

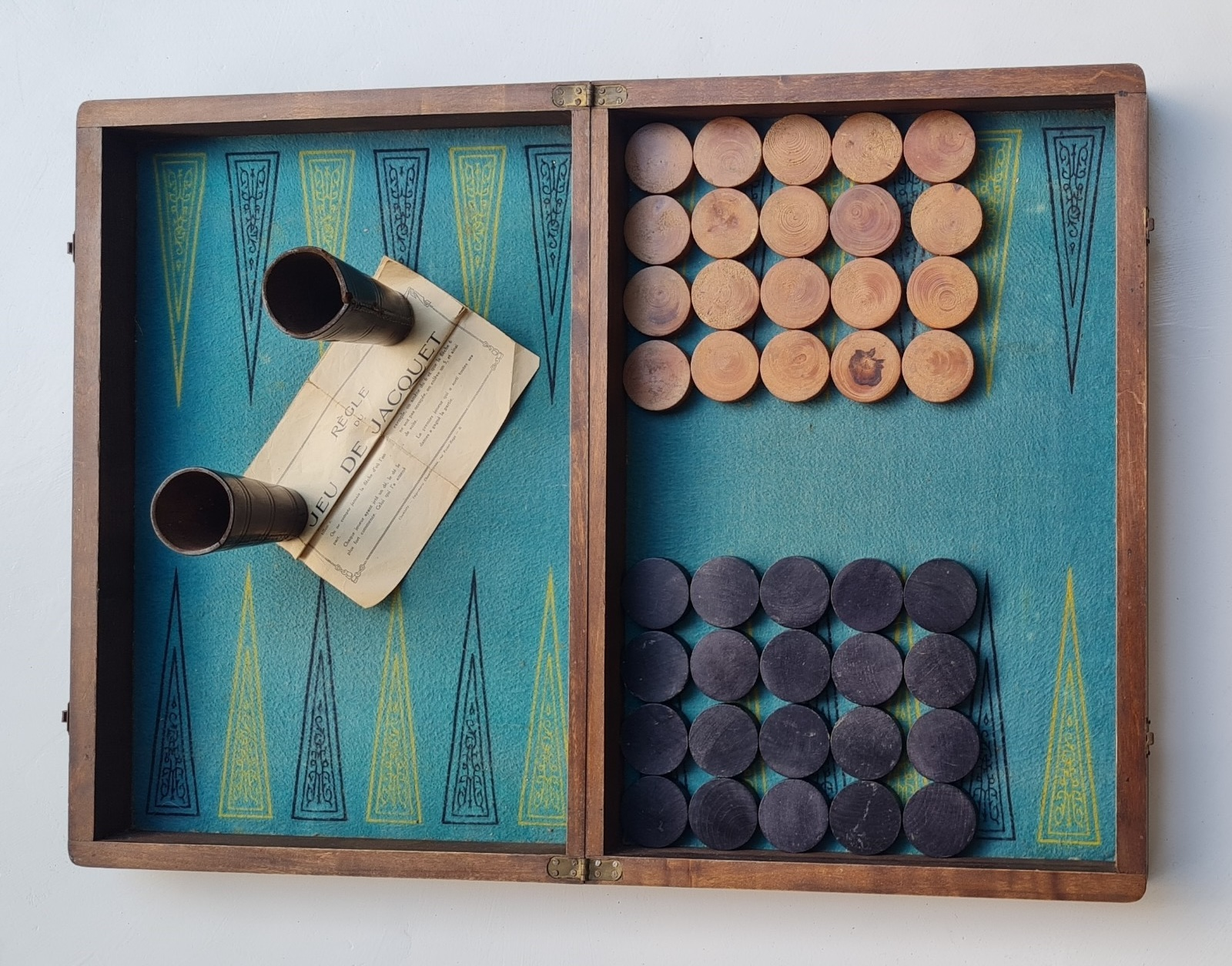
- Jacquet board and men (of which 5 extra per side, used for playing international draughts) (France, mid-20th century)
- Genres: Board game, race game, tables game
- Players: 2
- Movement: parallel
- Chance: Medium (dice rolling)
- Skills: Strategy, tactics, counting, probability

Related games
- Fevga • Laquet • Moultezim

Jacquet or jaquet is a tables game of parallel movement played on a backgammon-like board, very similar or identical to Fevga. It is distinct from other parallel-movement games (like Bräde) in that there is no hitting and no trapping; it is distinct from contrary-movement games (like Backgammon and Plakoto) in that all pieces move in the same direction; it is distinct from point-scoring games (like Trictrac and Toccategli) in that it is a straightforward race game; it is distinct from games in which doubles count once (like Trictrac) in that doubles count twice; and it is specifically unique in its use of the courier or jockey, a designated piece that must reach the final quadrant (the jan de retour) before any of the other pieces are moved.

Other names for Jacquet include Chaquete, 31, Tawla 31, Wāḥid wi-Talātīn, Maghrebiyya, and Mültezim. It is popular not only in France, but also in Greece (where it is played in fixed rotation with Backgammon and Plakoto), Turkey, Lebanon, Egypt, Spain, and Syria; it is played little or not at all in Iran, the United Kingdom, the United States, Austria, Denmark, and Sweden.

== History and culture ==
Jacquet emerged around 1800, eventually to become "the benchmark for tables games in France". Its oldest known rules were published in 1818 by Lepeintre as an appendix to his guide to playing Trictrac. During the course of the Trente Glorieuses, the game of Jacquet underwent something of a fad, displacing Trictrac in popularity, until Jacquet itself lost primacy first to Backgammon (as a tables game) and subsequently to television (as a means of entertainment generally).

In the 19th century, Jacquet was universally played in France on boards designed for Trictrac; these had twelve scoring holes drilled in each side rail, and three additional holes in each end rail. Such boards were usually sold with Trictrac-specific scoring equipment (alternatively, the players supplied their own), but the pack-in rules were generally those of Jacquet only. The reason might be surmised to be economic: the complexity of Trictrac is such that learning its complete, executable rules requires reading and internalising a paperback of approximately 120 pages, while the rules of Jacquet fit on a single double-sided sheet of paper, often given away for free with the board. (Such paperbacks commonly retailed, in 1773, for the price of one French livre and ten sous.)

With the beginning of the Jacquet fad, boards specific to this game were developed. These no longer had scoring holes (because Jacquet, unlike Trictrac, is a pure race game), nor a bar sufficiently wide to accommodate one of the two-inch discs that serve as men without it falling over (because Jacquet does not use the bar in any capacity at all—Trictrac uses it as a logical separator only, while Backgammon and Bräde use it as a sort of gaol for hit men). Such boards differ from the latter-day style of Backgammon board (as popularised in the United States) chiefly in their material characteristics (Jacquet boards of the twentieth century are generally upholstered in blue or green baize, with boxwood men, and the outside of the board normally has markings for chess or international draughts).

Importantly, though, in the early 20th century and beyond, Trictrac boards continued to be manufactured and sold by firms like Arthaud of Paris and C. Michel of Chambéry; so too are Jacquet boards, as well as the screen-printed baize necessary for their routine restoration after heavy use over long years. Likewise, writing in 1979, Jacques Léchalet states that Jacquet is the most popular tables game in France, while diagramming it on a Trictrac board with hole markings (in the same work, he sets out the rules of Jacquet de toutes tables—which is no more nor less than one of the French terms for Backgammon—as his collaborator Jean Tourangin does for Trictrac).

It is thus fair to say that the popularity of Backgammon, Trictrac, and Jacquet relative to one another has shifted (sometimes drastically) over the nineteenth, twentieth, and twenty-first centuries; it is not fair to say, for the sake of example, that Trictrac has been superseded or displaced by either of the other two games, though it is certainly the least widely played of the three, for reasons that may not be apparent at first blush and that have to do with their respective communities of players. Moreover, it is demonstrably false to say, as Léchalet did, that:

Le Tric-Trac quant à lui n'est pratiqué que par des amateurs très avertis possédant ces ravissantes tables à jeu d'époque Louis XV ou Louis XVI qui sont des merveilles d'ébénisterie et des meubles de choix très recherchés par les. antiquaires.

[Tric-trac, for its part, is played only by highly knowledgeable enthusiasts who own those delightful Louis XV- or Louis XVI-period gaming tables, which are masterpieces of cabinetmaking and highly prized pieces of furniture much sought after by antique dealers.]

— Jacques Léchalet, Le Jacquet, le Backgammon, le Tric-Trac, le Solitaire

Jacquet, in particular, is essentially synonymous with French café culture, beaches, and verandas; its character is straightforwardly demotic, in contradistinction to Trictrac, which, ever since its invention, acquired a not altogether undeserved association with salons, drawing rooms, and offices. For example, Euverte Jollyvet states, as early as the seventeenth century (in a book first published in 1635):

Autre raison d’excellence se peut tirer de ce que de cent mille personnes qui peuvent savoir ce jeu, on n’en trouvera pas dix de telle condition qui le sache, et le pratique : ou presque tous les autres sont aussi communs entre les pages, serviteurs et laquais, qu’entre les princes, seigneurs et gentilshommes […] Mais au Grand Trictrac, il n’y a que les gens d’honneur qui le pratiquent et encore les plus spirituels, actifs et vigilants qui le peuvent comprendre.

[Another reason for its excellence may be drawn from the fact that, out of a hundred thousand people who may know this game, one would not find ten of such standing who know it and play it; whereas almost all other games are as common among pages, servants, and lackeys as among princes, lords, and gentlemen. […] But as for Grand Trictrac, it is played only by people of honour, and even then only the most intelligent, active, and vigilant among them are capable of understanding it.]

— L’Excellent Jeu du tricque-trac, veuve Jean Promé, Paris, 1656, page 11

Abbé Laurent Soumille, in the preface to his treatise Le Grand Trictrac, is no less blunt one hundred years later:

À peine trouve-t-on quelquefois dans une ville un bon joueur de trictrac ; et pour l’apprendre de lui, il faudrait une heureuse conformité de loisir, de sentiments, d’inclinations : toutes choses si difficiles à trouver dans deux personnes, qu’il ne faut pas s’étonner si ce jeu, tout noble qu’il est, a si peu de cours dans le monde.

[One scarcely ever finds, even in a city, a good Trictrac player; and to learn the game from him, there would have to be a fortunate coincidence of leisure, tastes, and inclinations—all things so difficult to find in two people that it is no wonder this game, noble though it is, is so little played in the world.]

— Laurent Soumille, Le Grand Trictrac, Girard et Seguin, Avignon, 1738, Préface

Meanwhile, Léchalet makes a virtue of Jacquet's demotic accessibility:

Longtemps pratiqué dans les cafés et en famille, le Jacquet a retrouvé une nouvelle faveur dans les temps modernes. ... Le jeu devait nécessairement devenir populaire par la simplicité de ses coups, la rapidité de ses parties et le peu de difficultés qu'il semble présenter. Nous expliquerons plus loin pourquoi le mot semble est mis ici comme restriction à la croyance générale et erronée qui veut que le Jacquet soit une simple affaire de veine.

[Long played in cafés and among families, Jacquet has enjoyed a revival in modern times. … The game was bound to become popular because of the simplicity of its moves, the speed of its games, and the few difficulties it seems to present. We shall explain later why the word seems is used here as a qualification of the widespread but mistaken belief that Jacquet is simply a matter of luck.]

— Jacques Léchalet, Le Jacquet, le Backgammon, le Tric-Trac, le Solitaire

Prior to the arrival of Jacquet in France, one influential—but anonymous—Trictrac rulebook (known as le Charpentier in the community) imputed the same virtues (particularly its interruptibility) to Backgammon:

Ce jeu, entre les jeux de table, tient une des premières places ; il n'a pas tant de beauté que le Revertier ; cependant plusieurs le préfèrent au Trictrac ; parce qu'il est moins embarrassant, et qu'il ne faut pas continuellement avoir l'esprit bandé à marquer des points ou des trous.

[This game (i.e. Backgammon) holds one of the foremost places among tables games. It does not have quite the elegance of Verquere (i.e. the forerunner to Bräde); nevertheless, many prefer it to Trictrac, because it is less troublesome and does not require one to keep one’s mind constantly strained in order to keep track of points or holes.]

— Le jeu de Trictrac, comme on le joue aujourd'hui, "Toutes-Tables"

The vernacular aspect of Jacquet is also borne out by the fact that no universally accepted rules of Jacquet exist, though they differ essentially in only minor respects; in contrast, the rules of Trictrac have remained stable since 1635, although it has itself grown two variants in the intervening time. Jacquet therefore fills a specific niche in the French imagination: it is scarcely possible to imagine a Trictrac match being played in a noisy leisure centre atrium or on a popular beach—not for socioeconomic reasons, but because the game simply does not tolerate a divided attention span—but such a setting is essentially ideal for Jacquet.

Partie de tric-trac, short film directed by Louis Lumière (1896).

At the end of the nineteenth century, in 1896, the short film directed by Louis Lumière and entitled Partie de Tric-trac in fact depicts a game of Jacquet, recognisable from the direction in which the men move around the board and from the quadruple moves connected with doublets of the dice. For one reason or another, the author used the name Tric-trac for the title of his short film; while a mistake is possible, it instead could conceivably have been intentional as a reference to Prosper Mérimée's book of the same name.

It may be noted, however, that the above captures a sample of Jacquet culture as it exists in France, rather than any sort of global panorama. Jacquet is identical—or almost identical, depending on which rules have been consulted—to the Turkish game Mültezim or the Greek game Fevga. In those countries (as well as in Bulgaria and Syria), it is often played in rotation with Backgammon and Plakoto, an arrangement known as Tavli. The boards used in those countries are, quite simply, Backgammon boards; the culture associated with play whether of Jacquet or of Tavli in Syria or in Bulgaria is, once again, the culture of Backgammon, and the identity of "demanding indoor game of strategy" belongs and has always belonged instead to Chess.

It is also worth noting that, during the 19th century, confusion existed in French sources which sometimes equated Jacquet to Backgammon, but a distinctive feature was that the majority of pieces or men could not be moved until the first one, the courier, had reached the fourth quarter of the board. Other differences are that players start with all 15 men on their rightmost point (i.e. diagonally opposite from one another) and then play in the same direction around the board (though this is also true of Bräde, as well as all other parallel games).

== Principle ==
Players move their men around the board and then wait until they are all in the last quarter to remove them off the board. The movement of the men is based on the roll of the dice. Either two men are moved, each based on the pip count of one of the two dice; or one man is moved based on the combined pip count. The special feature of Jacquet is the obligation to bring one of the men into the last quarter of the board before the rest are moved; this man is the 'courier' or 'postilion' (postillon). Once the postilion is in place, the rest may move forward. The goal of the game is to be the first player to bear all 15 of one's own men off the board.

== Rules ==
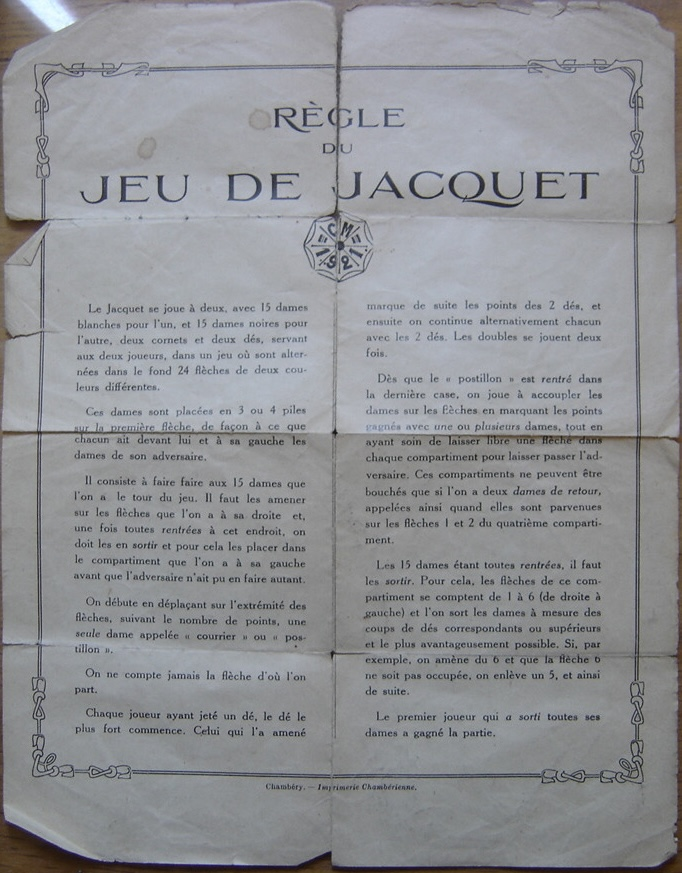
The complete rules of Jacquet, as bundled with a Tric-trac board manufactured by C. Michel in the mid-to-late 20th century.

=== 1. Players, equipment and object ===
Jacquet is played by two players on a board of twenty-four alternating points, divided into four tables of six points each.

The equipment consists of:

- fifteen men of one colour for each player;
- two dice, used by both players; and
- one dice-cup for each player.

Each player must conduct all fifteen of his men once around the board, bring them into his final or home table (jan de retour), and then bear them off. The first player to bear off all fifteen men wins.

Unlike Backgammon, men are never hit or captured and unlike Trictrac, points do not figure; there is therefore no need for side-rail holes or for a central bar, although if the board does have these things, it is certainly not to its disadvantage.

=== 2. Setting up the board ===
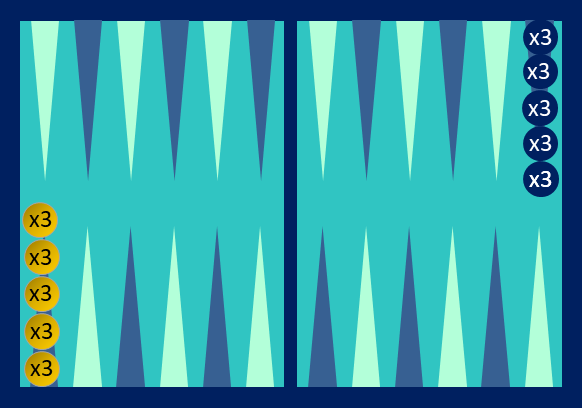
The starting layout.

All fifteen men of each colour begin together upon a single starting point. They may be arranged in three or four small stacks on that point for convenience.

The two starting stacks are placed so that each player has the opponent’s men before him and to his left. Equivalently, each player controls the stack lying to his opponent’s left.

From its starting point, each set of men follows its prescribed circuit around the board and ultimately enters the six-point home table on that player’s right.

The point from which a man starts is not counted. The next point in the direction of movement counts as one, the following point as two, and so forth.

=== 3. Determining the first player ===
Each player throws one die. The higher throw has the first play; equal throws are repeated.

Under the ordinary rule, the two numbers shown by the deciding dice constitute the opening roll: the winning player plays both numbers. Alternatively, the winning player may either use those two numbers or pick up both dice and throw them afresh. This should be agreed before play.

Thereafter the players alternate, throwing both dice on every turn.

A roll is traditionally announced with the higher die first: for example, “four–three”, “five–ace” or “six–two”. The dice should not be picked up until the player has seen and announced them.

=== 4. Playing the dice ===
Each die represents a separate movement.

The two numbers may be:

- played with two different men; or
- played successively with the same man.

When the same man uses both dice, the intermediate point is treated as having been played or “marked”, even though the man does not remain there. That intermediate point must therefore be legally available.

For example, on a roll of four–three, a man may move four points and then three, provided both the four-point intermediate landing and the final landing are legal.

Dice can be played in either order. The direction that the higher number is named first concerns the announcement of the roll, not necessarily its order of play.

Every legally playable number should be used. A number for which there is no legal move is lost. If neither number can be played, the player passes the turn.

The convention in Trictrac is that, in the case of "impotence" (impuissance, the inability to play a die for lack of legal moves), the higher die must be used; if it is impotent, then the lower die; and only in the case of both being impotent may the player skip his turn. This convention is also normally played in Jacquet.

It is also conventional to agree that, in the case of combined moves, the man in question must briefly rest on the intermediate point, to assure the opponent that the intermediate point is in fact legally attainable.

=== 5. Doubles ===
A double is played as if four dice had shown the same number. Thus “doubles are played twice”, meaning that the two equal dice are each played twice:

- double ace, ambesas or beset, gives four movements of one;
- double two, binet, gives four movements of two;
- double three, ternes, gives four movements of three;
- double four, quarnes, gives four movements of four;
- double five, quines, gives four movements of five; and
- double six, sonnez, gives four movements of six.

=== 6. The postillon ===
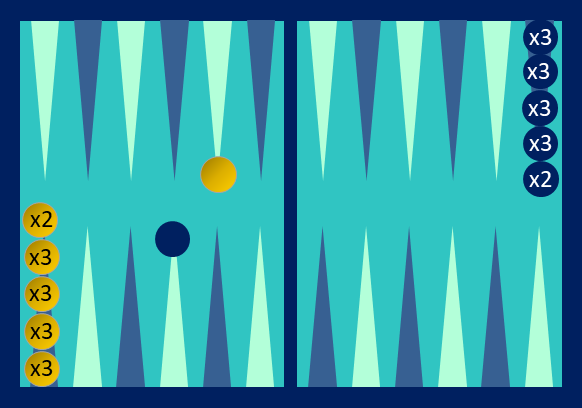
The postilions are out; White has reached the bearing table, may now place the postilion at the point base and move the remaining men; Black may not.

At the beginning of the game, only one man may be moved. This leading man is called the postillon or courier.

Traditionally, the postillon is placed towards the tips of the points while making its circuit, so that its special status remains apparent.

Every available movement must be made with the postillon until it has entered any one of the six points in the player’s home table, that being the fourth and final table of its circuit. Until then, no other man may be moved.

As soon as the postillon has entered the home table, all the player’s other men may be moved normally.

==== Opening examples ====
The opponent’s starting stack is itself an occupied point and cannot be landed upon.

Consequently:

- double five is an excellent early throw, since the postillon can ordinarily make all four movements and advance twenty points;
- with double six, the postillon can make the first movement of six, but its next movement would land upon the opponent’s starting stack, so the remaining sixes cannot be played;
- with double three, it can ordinarily play three of the four threes, advancing nine points, but the fourth would land upon the opposing stack.

=== 7. Occupied points ===
A man may land upon:

- an empty point; or
- a point already occupied by any number of the player’s own men.

There is no limit to the number of friendly men that may be stacked on one point.

A man may not land upon a point occupied by even one opposing man. There are no exposed “blots” and no hitting: one opposing man blocks a landing point just as effectively as several.

A man may pass over an isolated occupied point, since only the landing point of each die matters. A sequence of six consecutive occupied points, however, forms a complete barrier, because no die can carry an opposing man past it without first landing upon one of those six points.

Once the postillon is home, players normally seek to pair or group their men on useful points, form barriers, and preserve connected positions through the successive tables.

=== 8. Closing a table ===
There is material disagreement among different circles of play about when a complete six-point barrier may be formed. The following restrictive convention produces the clearest combined rule.

=== Consolidated convention ===
A player must leave at least one point open in each table through which the opponent still has to pass.

A player acquires the right to close a table completely after establishing two return men upon the 1- and 2-points of his home table.

A return man is a man that has completed its circuit and reached one of those advanced home points.

Once the required return men have been established, the player may occupy six consecutive points and completely stop the opponent’s passage.

Because this rule differs substantially, players should expressly agree upon one of the following conventions:

1. Unrestricted closing. A player may form a six-point barrier whenever his play permits it. No return men are required.
2. Return-men convention. At least one point must remain open in every table until the player has two return men established upon the home 1- and 2-points.
3. Variable convention. At least one point must remain free in the starting table. By prior agreement, the right to close the opponent may require either one or two return men.

The third option gives the most definite restrictive rule; the second expressly makes the number of return men a matter of convention; the first imposes no such qualification.

=== 9. Entering the home table ===
After the postillon has arrived, the remaining men are conducted around the board and into the home table.

A player should ordinarily try to distribute his men advantageously among its six points. Occupying the lower-numbered points—particularly 1, 2 and 3—will generally make the eventual bearing-off process easier.

No man may be borne off until all fifteen of that player’s men have entered the home table.

=== 10. Numbering the home table ===
For bearing off, the six points in the home table are numbered from right to left, as seen by the player:

1 – 2 – 3 – 4 – 5 – 6

The rightmost point is therefore the ace-point; the leftmost is the six-point.

Movement within the home table continues towards the ace-point and then off the board.

=== 11. Bearing off ===
Once all fifteen men are in the home table, the player may begin bearing them off.

Each die is dealt with separately.

==== Exact bearing off ====
A die may bear off one man from the correspondingly numbered point:

- an ace bears off a man from point 1;
- a two bears off from point 2;
- and so forth up to six.

A double supplies four such plays. Double five, for example, may bear off four men from the 5-point if four are available there.

==== Moving within the home table ====
A die need not always be used to bear off an available man. It may instead be used to advance a man from a higher-numbered point towards the ace-point.

For example, a five may move a man from the 6-point to the 1-point.

This permits strategic redistribution. On double five, a player might bear off two men from the 5-point and use the other two fives to move two men from the 6-point to the 1-point, rather than bearing off four from the 5-point.

==== When the corresponding point is empty ====
If the point corresponding to the die is empty:

1. If a man remains on a higher-numbered point, the die is used, where possible, to move such a man towards the ace-point. Thus, if a five is thrown, the 5-point is empty and a man remains on the 6-point, that man may be moved from 6 to 1.
2. If no man remains on any higher-numbered point, one man may be borne off from the highest occupied lower-numbered point. Thus, if a six is thrown, the 6-point is empty and the highest occupied point is 5, a man may be borne off from the 5-point.

A player may combine removals and internal movements in the same turn, and the four plays supplied by a double may similarly be divided among different legal uses.

=== 12. End of the game ===
The first player to bear off all fifteen men wins. In match play, it is common to agree that the first player to bear off all 15 men scores 1 point, and if this is achieved before the opponent bears off a single man, 2 points. If the board does have holes for Trictrac, they may be used to score the Jacquet match.

== Jacquet de Versailles ==
A variant called Jacquet de Versailles was invented to speed up the game. The changes are:

- Doublets are squared, not doubled e.g. a double 5 is worth 25, not 20.
- Every die roll is used, so:
  - The dice rolled to decide the lead are used on the first turn by the player rolling the higher die.
  - If they roll a double, both players move their men and roll again for the lead.
  - If a player cannot play a die, that player plays higher die and the opponent uses the other.
  - If a player cannot utilise either dice, the opponent plays them.
  - If the opponent cannot play the two dice without uncovering a point, he immediately takes the lead and rethrows the second die.

Lêchalet (1976) reprints the above rules by Moulidars but calls it Le Jacquet Rapide.

== Spanish Backgammon ==
Hale describes rules for a variant known as "Spanish Backgammon or Jacquet". The key variation is that, once a player has borne off all 15 men, the opponent is penalised 3 points for every man left in the first table, 2 for every man in the second, and 1 point for every man left in the last table.

== Literature ==
- Faligot, Urbain (2001). Comment jouer au Backgammon, au Jacquet et au Trictrac. 2nd edn. (1st edn. 1998). ISBN 9782732804446
- Fiske, Willard (1905). Chess in Iceland and Icelandic Literature: With Historical Notes on Other Table-Games. Florence: Florentine Typographical Society.
- Hale, Lucretia Peabody (1888). Fagots for the Fireside: A Collection of More Than One Hundred Entertaining Games for Evenings at Home and Social Parties. Boston: Ticknor.
- Lebrun, M. (1828), Manuel des jeux de calcul et de hasard, Roret, Gallica, pp. 85-86.
- Léchalet, Jacques (1987) Le Jacquet, Le Backgammon, Le Tric Trac, Le Solitaire, 2nd edn. (1st edn. 1979), Bornemann. 55 pp. ISBN 9782851820778
- Lhôte, Jean-Marie (1994). Histoire des Jeux de Société. Flammarion. 671 pp. ISBN 9782080109293
- Moulidars, Th. de (1888). Grande Encyclopédie Méthodique, Universelle, Illustrée des Jeux et des Divertissements de L'Esprit et du Corps. Paris.
- Parlett, David (1999). The Oxford History of Board Games. Oxford: OUP, pp. 75–76 and 86. ISBN 9780192129987
