= James Farewell =

- Born: 1666; Horsington, Somerset, England
- Died: 1689 (aged 22–23); Lincoln's Inn, London
- Education: Sherborne School, Wadham College, Oxford (no degree)
- Occupations: Lawyer, Poet
- Writing career
- Notable work: The Irish Hudibras

James Farewell (1666–1689) was a lawyer and poet, chiefly remembered as the author of The Irish Hudibras, a caricature of Irish customs and language based on Book VI of Virgil's Aeneid.

== Background ==
He was the son of Thomas Farewell of Horsington, Somerset, England, and educated at Sherborne, then to Wadham College, Oxford, which he left without a degree and proceeded to Lincoln's Inn to study law.

== The Irish Hudibras ==
In 1689 Farewell published The Irish Hudibras or Fingallian Prince, a humorous retelling of Book VI of Virgil's Aeneid transferred to the scene of Stuart Ireland relating the adventures of an Irish prince Nees. The poem somewhat savagely caricatures Irish customs and the people of Fingal in particular to portray the Irish as superstitious, ignorant and uncivilised.

While in many ways a typical work of a Protestant Englishman of the times, the work is nevertheless remarkable for its deep knowledge of the Hiberno-English of the late seventeenth century, and it remains an important source on the life and customs of life and language in Ireland of this period.

The Oxford antiquary Anthony Wood described Farewell as "a witty young man and tolerable poet". He died of smallpox in or near Lincoln's Inn in 1689.
