= Glossary of tables game terms =

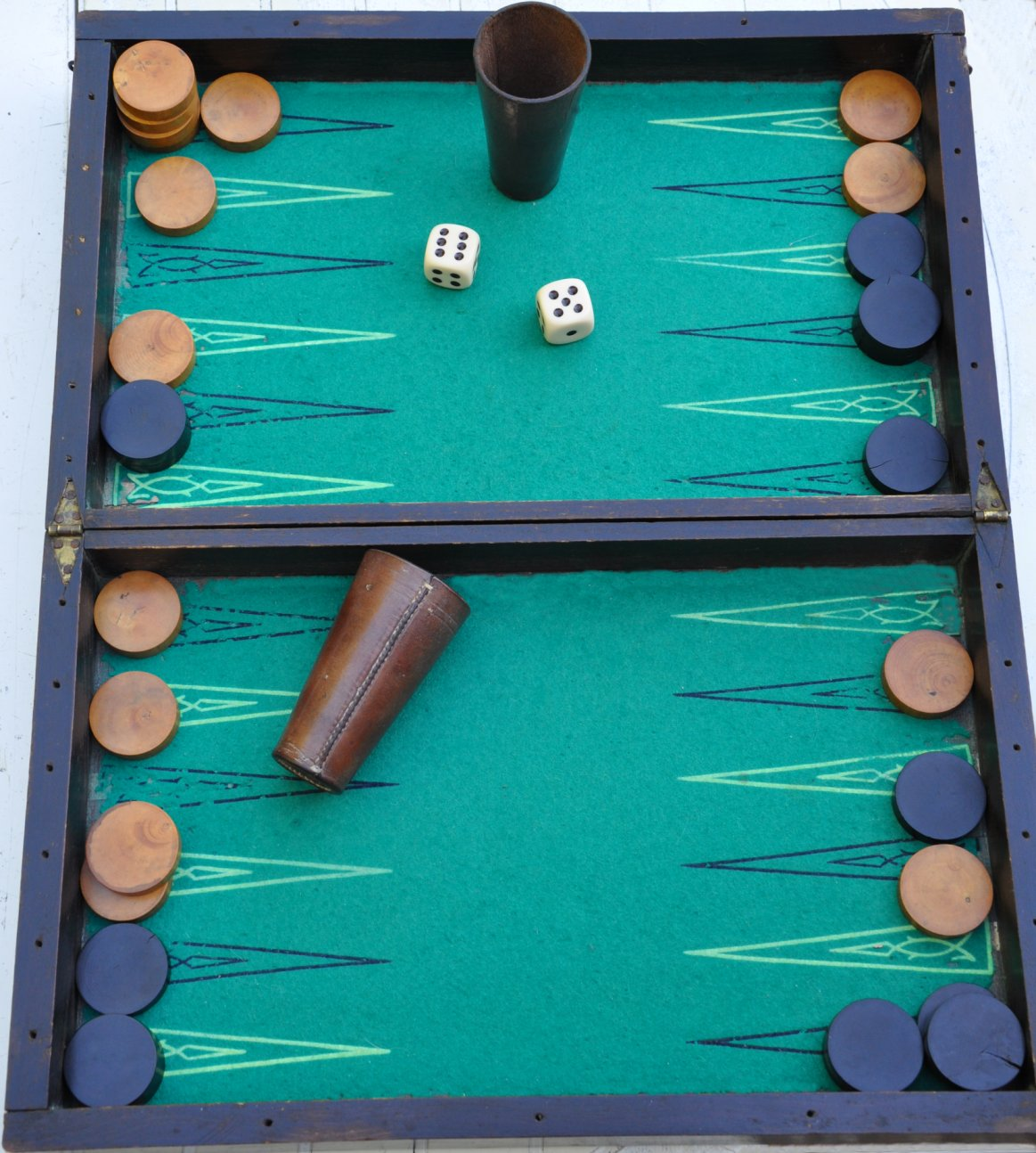
Tables board used for Jacquet

The following is a glossary of terms used in tables games, essentially games played on a Backgammon-type board. Terms in this glossary should not be game-specific (e.g. specific to a single game like Backgammon or Acey-deucey), but applicable to a range of tables games.

== A ==
ace

1. A die roll of one.
2. The face of a die with one pip:. (Historically, 2=deuce, 3=trey, 4=quater, 5=cinc, 6=sice; though these terms are now obsolete.)

ace point
The player's first point on the board. Also home point or one point.

== B ==
backgammon
A game in which the loser has not only failed to bear any pieces off, but has pieces in the opponent's home table or on the bar. It is worth triple.

bar
The central strip separating the left and right halves of the board, usually formed by the raised edges or rails of each half board. The raised partition of the board.

bear off
To remove one's men from the board in the final stages of a game. The first to do so usually wins the game; however, in Trictrac, it scores points but the game continues. Also throw off or take off.

The standard bearing off procedure used in most tables games is as follows:
Bearing off is the process of removing one's men (pieces, checkers) off the board in the last phase of the game. To do this a player must move all 15 men into the home table first. To bear them, the player then rolls the dice and removes a man from a point whose number corresponds to that on one of the dice. Thus a roll of 5-1 allows a player to remove one man from the 5-point and another from the Ace or 1-point (next to the end of the board). If the point corresponding to a die roll is unoccupied, a man must be removed from a higher-numbered point. If they are empty too, a man must be removed from the highest numbered point that is occupied.

— 2.5 Bearing Off at gnu.org.

bearing table
The table in which men are borne off.

block
Any point on the board where two or more men rest. An opponent may not land on such a point.

blockade
A succession of blocked points i.e. points held by at least two men. Also prime.

blot
A single man on a point. In many tables games, this is a vulnerable situation as the man is liable to be hit by an opposing man.

board

1. The whole playing area, traditionally a hinged, wooden tray.
2. Same as quadrant. Thus there are four boards. In Backgammon and similar games, there is a home board and outer board on each player's side.

break a point
To remove one of two men on a point, thus leaving a blot. Also clear a point.

builder
Once two men have been placed on a point, any extra men are builders.

== C ==
cast

1. The number rolled on a die or dice.
2. To throw or roll the die or dice.

checker
US backgammon term for any of the pieces used for playing the game. Also counter, man or stone.

cinque

1. A die roll of five
2. The face of a die with five pips:.

closed point, closed space

1. Usually, a point or space that is occupied by two or more opposing men.
2. In some games, a point or space that is occupied by exactly two opposing men. See Nard.

cocked die
A die that comes to rest tilted and not flat. May be automatically invalid in some games.

come in, come on
To bring a man back into play, after it has been hit or knocked off.

contrary movement
A game of contrary movement is one in which the players move their pieces in opposing directions. Examples: Backgammon, Trictrac.

corner rattler, hornaskella
A player's last pieces in the Icelandic game Chasing the girls (Að Elta Stelpur).

counter
Any one of the pieces used for playing the game. Also checker (US), man or stone.

cover a blot
To place a second man on an isolated piece thus making a point.

cup
The container used to throw the dice or die. Should have a small lip on the inside to prevent fixing the dice. Also dice cup.

== D ==
dice cup
A cup used to shake and roll the dice.

die, dice
A die is one of usually two or three six-sided cubes used in playing a tables game. Each face of the cube is marked with a number of pips from 1 to 6 that is used in moving men or scoring. Plural: dice.

division
Same as quadrant.

doubles
See doublet.

doublet
Two dice each with the same pip count. In some tables games, the player plays each die twice. Also doubles. In French tables games, there were individual names for the doublets as follows:
- doublet of Aces: bezas (diminutive of ambesas), bezet;
- doublet of 2: double two (doublet de deux);
- doublet of 3: ternes;
- doublet of 4: carmes;
- doublet of 5: quines;
- doublet of 6: sonnez.

doubling cube, doubling die
An extra and slightly larger die used especially in modern Backgammon to raise the game value or stakes on the game. Marked with the numerals 2, 4, 8, 16, 32 and 64.

== E ==
enter
To play a piece onto the tables or board.

expose a blot, expose a point
See uncover a blot.

exposed
Said of a man that sits alone on a point. In most games he is vulnerable to being hit by an opposing man.

== G ==
gammon
A game in which the loser has failed to bear off any pieces. It is worth double.

== H ==
hit

1. In hitting games, to force an isolated opposing piece (or blot) off the board by moving a piece to the point concerned e.g. as in Backgammon. Also 'knock off'.
2. To score points by being in a position to move a piece to a point on which an isolated opposing piece is located e.g. as in Trictrac.

The standard hitting rules used in most tables games are as follows:
The player rolls a die whose resulting number enables him to move a man (piece, checker) onto a point occupied by one opposing man, known as a blot. The player moves the man to that point and removes the opponent's blot to the bar. The opponent, in turn, must re-enter the hit piece before making any other move on the board.

— Molyneux, J. du C. Vere (1997). Begin Backgammon. Tadworth: Right Way. p. 17.

hit and run, hit-and-run
Move in which a player uses one throw to hit an opposing blot and a second throw to move the hitting piece to a point occupied by a friendly piece.

hitting game
A game in which hitting a blot is permitted. Examples: Backgammon and Portes.

home

1. noun. The first point on a player's side.
2. noun. The starting or finishing point.
3. adverb. To the player's first six points.
4. To play at home. To play one's pieces in one's first twelve points.

home board, home table
That quadrant of the board containing a player's points 1 to 6. Also inner board or inner table. Sometimes also called the finishing quadrant or bearing table.

home point
See ace point.

homewards
Towards the player's first point.

== I ==
inner board, inner table
See home board.

== K ==
knock off
See hit.

== M ==
march
The route of one or more men around the board.

man, men
Any of the counters used to play a tables game. Formerly table-man. Man is the traditional English term, but it is also called a checker (US), (Note: 'Checker' is predominantly an American backgammon term that derives from checkers, the American name for draughts. Checkers is not, however, a tables game.) counter, (Note: Strictly 'counter' is incorrect as they are not used for counting or scoring. In the tables game of Trictrac there are 3 counters actually used for scoring as well as the 30 men used for playing.) piece or stone.

move
The action of advancing a man in accordance with the roll of a die. If a man is advanced by the total score on two dice, it is a double move.

The standard rules of movement used in most tables games are as follows:
The player rolls the dice. For each number on a die, the player must move either one man (piece, checker) forward by the same number of points on one die and a second man by the number on the second die; or one man by the sum of the two dice, provided that the intermediate point (corresponding to a single move based on one of the dice) is not blocked. For example, on a throw of 5-3, the player may move one man forward by 5 points and a second man by 3 points; or one man by 8 points, as long as the 3rd or 5th point en route is open.
If a doublet is thrown, this counts as four separate moves each of the number thrown. Thus, on the throw of a double 4, the player may either move one man 16 points; or two men 8 points each; or two men 4 points and one man 8 points; or four men 4 points each. Each move must be legal i.e. to an open point that is not blocked by the rules of the individual game. Men may only move forwards, not backwards.

— Molyneux, J. du C. Vere (1997). Begin Backgammon. Tadworth: Right Way. pp. 14–17

== O ==
off the board
Placed anywhere that is not on the playing surface. Where a man is sent when hit.

open point, open space

1. Usually, a point or space that is not occupied by two or more opposing men.
2. In some games, point or space that is not occupied by exactly two men. See Nard.

opening roll
The first dice throw of a game which decides who will go first

outer board, outer table
The penultimate quadrant of the board, preceding the player's home table or inner table.

== P ==
parallel movement
A game of parallel movement is one in which the players move their pieces in the same direction around the board. Examples: Fevga, Jacquet, Narde, Moultezim.

piece
Any of the counters used in tables games. Also checker, man or stone. Man is the traditional term.

pile

1. A stack of two or more men on a point.
2. To place men one on top of another.

pin, pinning, pinning a blot
In pinning games, to move a piece onto a point containing a single enemy man thus preventing it from further movement.

pinning game
A game in which pinning a blot is permitted. Example: Plakoto.

pip, pips
The spots on the dice.

play
To move a man based on the roll of a die or dice.

point, make a point, make the point

1. Any one of the triangular spaces on a tables board.
2. To make a point is to establish two or more men on it such that it cannot be captured.

prime

1. A succession of blocked points, normally points held by at least two opposing men. (Note: In some games a point is blocked if occupied by one adverse man.) Also blockade.
2. A succession of six points so occupied. Also side prime.

== Q ==
quadrant
One of the four sections of a tables board. Also board, division, quarter or table.

quarter
Same as quadrant.

== R ==
rail
Same as off the board. The rail is the raised edge of the board.

re-enter
To play a man to the board after it has been removed, typically after being hit.

rest
A man is said to 'rest' when he pauses on an intermediate point in moving the total of two or more dice.

roll the die, roll the dice
To project or throw the die or dice onto the board. Also cast or throw.

running game
A game in which there is no hitting or pinning and players 'race' around the board in the same direction. Examples: Jacquet and Fevga. See also games of parallel movement.

== S ==
setting the men
To place the men in position at the start of a game.

side prime
A blockade of six consecutive points. See also prime.

singleton
A single man on a point; also called a blot.

space
One of usually 24 rectangular sections of a tables board, especially an historical one, one which men may be placed during play. Equivalent of point q.v.

stack

1. To place men one on top of one another. Also pile.
2. A heap of men so placed. Also pile.

stone
See man.

== T ==
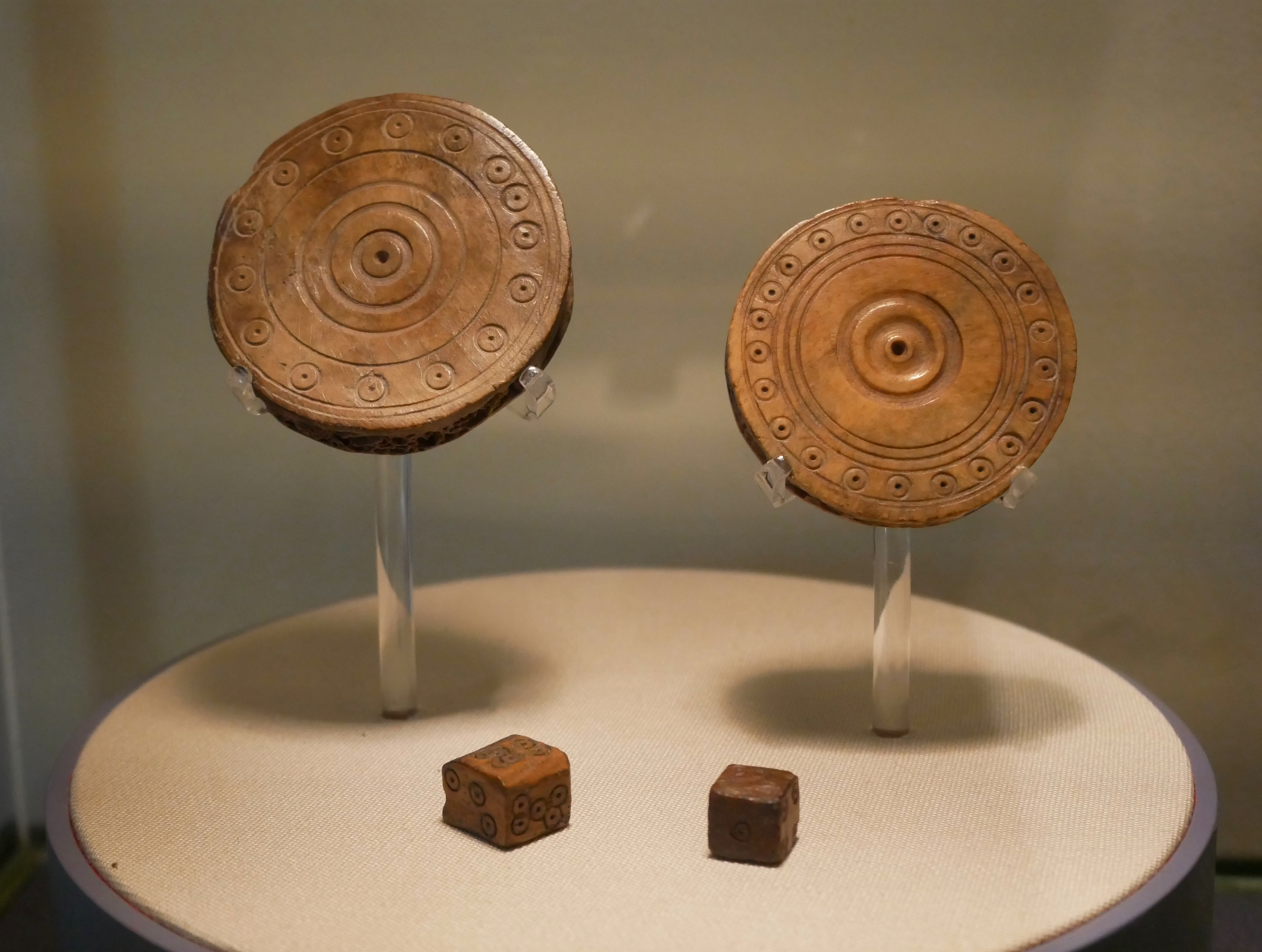
13th century tablemen at the Tower of London

table

1. Same as quadrant. One of the four divisions of the board.
2. Sometimes used to describe each half of the board (left and right).

tableman, tablemen, table-man, table-men
Original name for the pieces or men, q.v.

Tables board
The playing surface of a tables game.

Tables game
A game played using a tables board.

talon
Point no. 1 in French tables games such as Trictrac and Jacquet.

throw

1. Same as roll when referring to dice.
2. Throw off. Same as bear off.

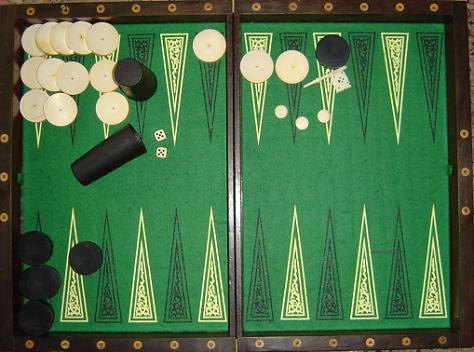
Trictrac board and equipment

trictrac, Trictrac board
Type of board used for Trictrac and other French tables games. Similar to a backgammon board, but with high side rails and holes in the rails for scoring purposes.

triplet
Three dice each with the same pip count.

== U ==
uncover a blot, uncover a point
To remove a man or men from a point leaving only one man behind, who is thus exposed.

== Literature ==
- Bell, R. C. (1979). Board and Table Games from Many Civilizations. NY: Dover. ISBN 0486238555
- Clay, Robin A. (1992). Backgammon. London: Hodder.
- Crane, Michael (2006). Backgammon. London: Teach Yourself.
- Forgeng, Jeff, Dorothy Johnston and David Cram (2003). Francis Willughby's Book of Games. Ashgate Press. ISBN 1 85928 460 4.
- Halliwell-Phillips, James Orchard (1852). A Dictionary of Archaic & Provincial Words, Obsolete Phrases, Proverbs and Ancient Customs, Volume 2 (J–Z). London: John Russell Smith.
- Jacoby, Oswald and John R. Crawford (1970). The Backgammon Book. NY: Vikong.
- Longacre, John (1980). Backgammon of Today. NY: Bell.
- Murray, H. J. R. (1941). "The Mediæval Game of Tables". Medium Ævum. 10 (2): 57–69. doi:10.2307/43626206. JSTOR 43626206.
- Murray, H. J. R. (1941). "“The Mediaeval Games of Tables" in Medium Aevum, Vol. 10, ed. by Charles Talbot Onions. Society for the Study of Mediæval Languages and Literature. pp. 57-69.
- Obolensky, Prince Alexis and Ted James (1974). Backgammon. London: Star. [Originally publ. as Backgammon: The Action Game, NY: Collier (1969) and London: Allen (1971).]
- Parlett, David (2018). Parlett's History of Board Games (Revised ed.). Brattleboro, VT: Echo Point Books & Media. ISBN 978-1-62654-881-7.
- Singman, Jeffrey L. (1999). Daily Life in Medieval Europe. Westport: Greenwood.
