= Gioul =

Levantine tables game

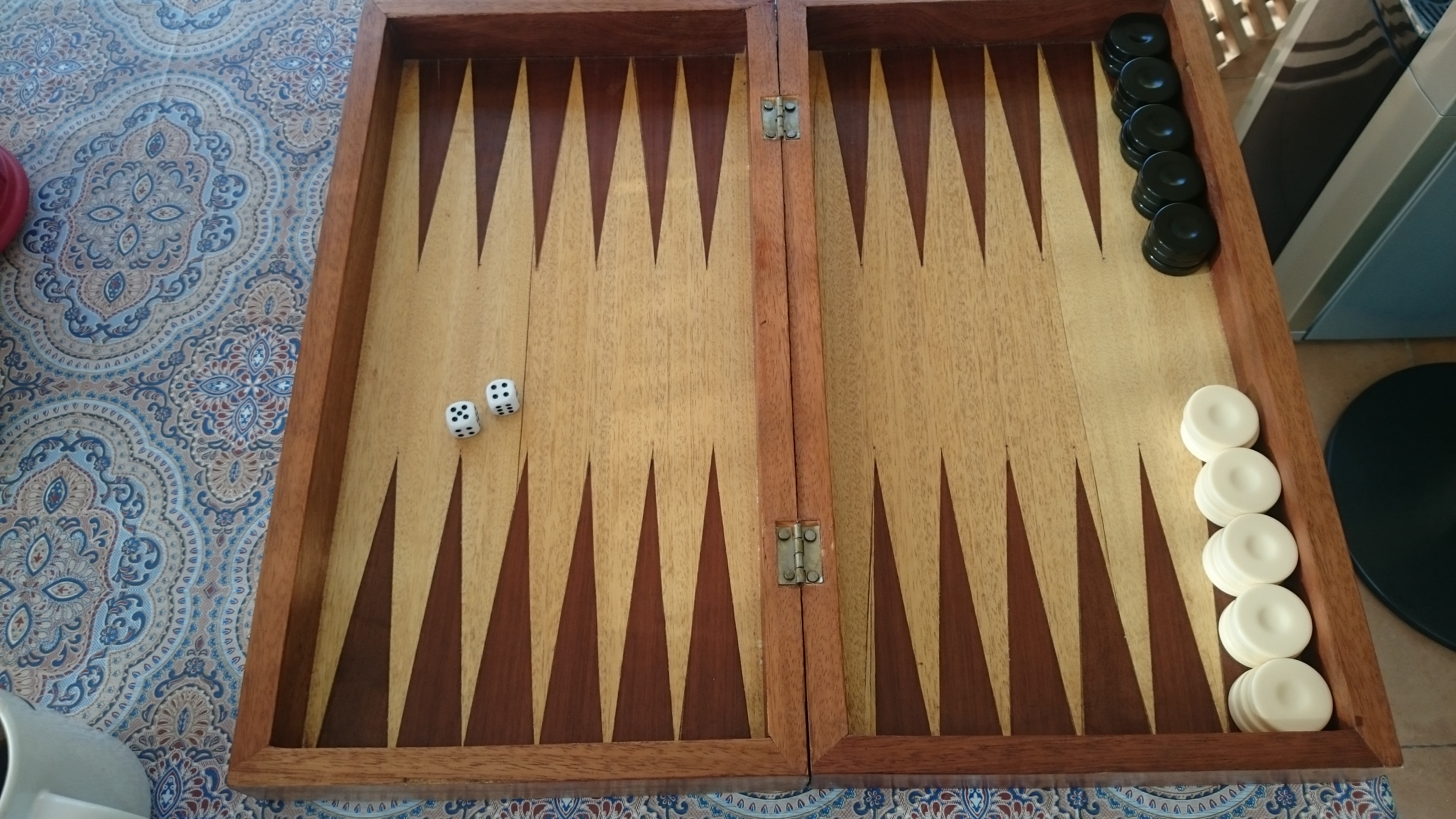
- The starting position in Gioul
- Genres: Board game, race game, tables game
- Players: 2
- Movement: contrary
- Chance: Medium (dice rolling)
- Skills: Strategy, tactics, counting, probability

Gioul is a tables game for two players that is common in the Levant and may have originated in Turkey. The set up and play are as in Greek Plakoto, blocking is as in Moultezim and doublets are very powerful as in the game of Gul Bara.

== Overview ==
Gioul is a game of contrary movement, that is, the players play in opposite directions around the board. It is also a running game in which opposing men may not hit or pinned, but must bypass one another.

== Rules ==
The following rules are based on Jacoby and Crawford (1970), except where stated:

Each player sets up 15 pieces or men on the opponent's Ace point. Each player rolls a die for the first move and the one with the highest score wins.

That player re-rolls to begin the game. Thereafter the winner of a game leads to the next.

In turn, each player advances two pieces around the board towards the opponent's starting point, each move corresponding to one of the numbers on the dice. Alternatively one piece may be moved by the combined total on the dice, provided the intermediate point is open. To be open a point must be unoccupied by any opposing men. One man on a point blocks it to the opponent. Six points in a row occupied by the same player constitute a prime.

The distinctive feature of Gioul is the role of the doublets. On rolling a doublet, the player plays the number rolled 4 times. Then the player plays the next higher number 4 times and so on until four 6's have been played. Only then does the turn pass to the opponent. If the player is unable to make use of a throw, the turn ends and the rest of the moves are forfeited to the opponent who then plays them out as far as possible, before then rolling again for his or her turn.

Bearing off is executed in the standard way once all pieces have reached the home table. The winner is the first player to bear off all 15 pieces, earning 1 point. If this is achieved before the opponent has borne off any pieces, the game is worth 2 points.

== Literature ==
- Jacoby, Oswald and John R. Crawford (1970). The Backgammon Book. NY: Viking. p. 213.
- Obolensky, Prince Alexis and Ted James (1969). Backgammon: The Action Game. London: Allen. p. 168.
- Parlett, David (1999). The Oxford History of Board Games. Oxford: OUP.
- Tzannes, Nicolaos and Basil Tzannes (1977). Backgammon Games and Strategies. South Brunswick: Barnes. p. 247.
