= The Really Nasty Horse Racing Game =

Board game developed by Simon Knock

The Really Nasty Horse Racing Game is a board game combining luck and tactics. It was designed by Simon Knock in 1987.

== Contents ==
The game set consists of an oversized game board, bookmaker's board, betting slips, deck of specials cards, stack of money, dice, and six large plastic horses-and-jockeys and other items. Each player is assigned a horse and races it around the track by rolling a single die. Players can bet on another player's horse, and are issued cards which allow them to commit dirty tricks, for instance making a horse fall or forcing the winner to take a drug test.

== Reception ==
Brian Walker reviewed The Really Nasty Horse Racing Game for Games International magazine, and gave it 3 stars out of 5, and stated that "Undemanding families will no doubt enjoy it as it is, and for collectors, well, this will definitely go on top of the heap."
