= Long Game =

Long Game or Long game may refer to:

- "The Long Game", a 2005 Doctor Who TV episode
- The Long Game (film), a 2023 American historical sports drama film
- The Long Game (novel), a 2022 gay sports romance novel by Rachel Reid
- Long Game, or Ludus Anglicorum, an historical English tables game
- Long game, or long con, a scam that unfolds over time
