= Wasteland Express Delivery Service =

Tabletop board game

- Designers: Jonathan Gilmour, Ben Pinchback, Matt Riddle
- Illustrators: Riccardo Burchielli, Josh Cappel, Scott Hartman, Jason D. Kingsley
- Publishers: Pandasaurus Games (2017)
- Players: 2-5
- Playing time: 90-120 minutes
- Chance: Moderate
- Age range: 14+
- Skills: Strategy, tactics, logic

Wasteland Express Delivery Service is a board game for 2 to 5 players published by Pandasaurus Games in 2017. Designed by Jon Gilmour, Matt Riddle, and Ben Pinchback, the players in the game are couriers in a post-apocalyptic wasteland, racing to complete deliveries across a scorched landscape faster than their opponents. Players obtain cargo, such as guns, food and water, through purchase or by taking them from raider trucks which periodically attack the players. Players fulfill private contracts to obtain money and new upgrades to their truck's abilities, while the first player to complete three publicly available contracts, which range from digging up treasure to hauling a nuclear warhead across the country, wins the game.

== Gameplay ==
Players compete to deliver guns and other goods from one place to another across the post-apocalyptic landscape, completing deliveries, upgrading their trucks, and recruiting allies, while dealing with random events which happen each turn. Players can also battle raiders, make trades at outposts, and complete missions on behalf of different factions in the game.

Players have the choice of one of five available drivers to play, each of which has its own unique backstory, starting abilities, and rig. The game can be played in a campaign mode, which features story based scenarios.

Each round, players can take actions until they deplete their five action markers. If the player moves, they can move more with each subsequent action, creating momentum as long as they keep moving.
