= Tourne case =

Board game

Tourne-case
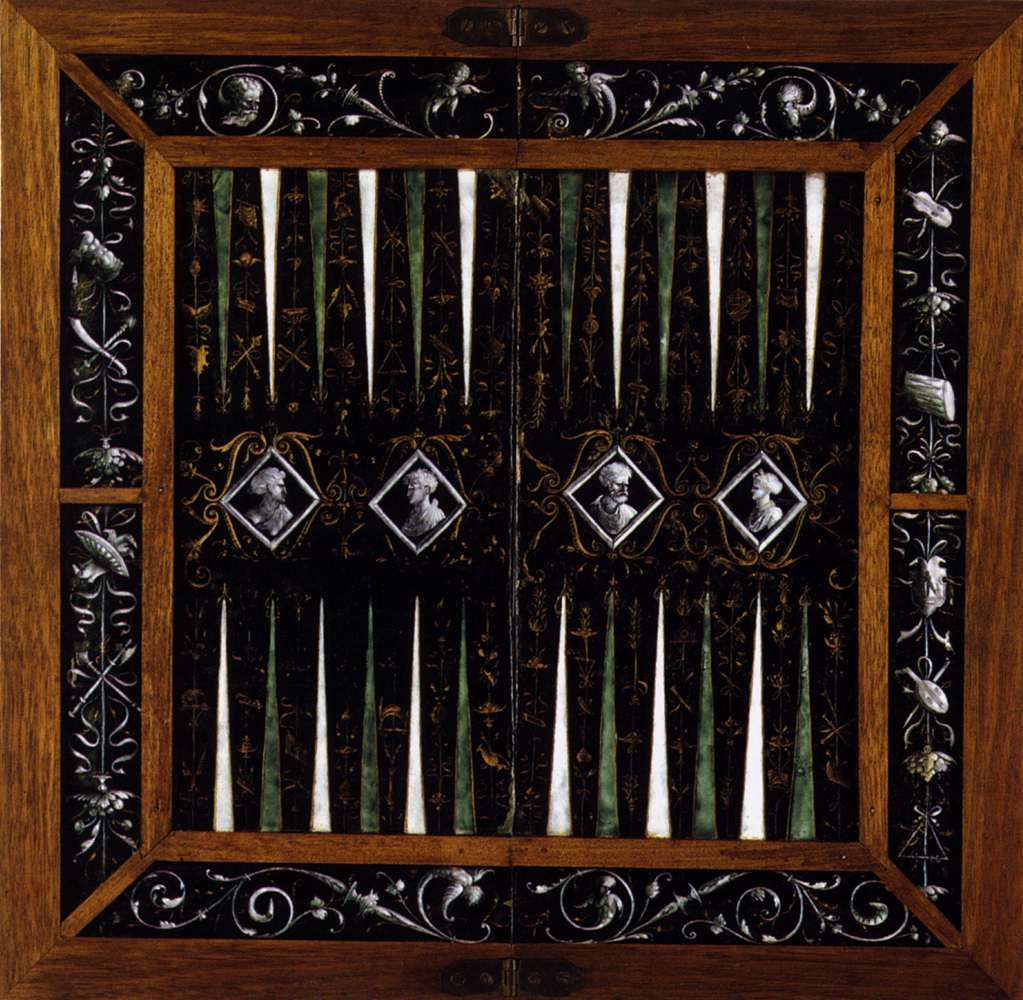
- Historical, ornate, French tables board
- Genres: Board game Race game Dice game
- Players: 2
- Movement: contrary
- Playing time: 15 minutes
- Chance: medium-high (dice rolling)
- Age range: 5+
- Skills: Strategy, tactics, counting, probability

Tourne case or tourne-case is an historical French tables game in the same family as backgammon. Lalanne recommends it as a children's game.

Some sources suggested that the name originated in the fact that a counter that was 'hit' had to be returned (retourner) to the box (case) or trictrac table. However, Fallavel suggests it is more likely to mean 'point of three', referring to the final point on which a player must place three counters in order to win. (Note: Tourne is old French for 'three' and case for 'point', hence referring to the home point as the point of three. See, for example, Charpentier (1715), p. 9 of "Regles du Jeu du Revertier".)

== History ==
The game is mentioned by Rabelais in Gargantua in 1532 and its rules are recorded in French games compendia from the end of the 17th century to the late 19th century. (Note: For example, in Moulidars (1888).) A variant called La Course en Ligne Droite is also recorded in the late 20th century.

== Equipment ==
Like all tables games, tourne case requires a tables board made up of two rows of twelve points in the shape of triangles, three counters called pieces or men (Note: The French is dames which means "women", but men is the usual English term in tables games.) for each player, as well as two dice cups and two dice. The board used to be known in France as a trictrac board.

== Principle ==
The players move their men in parallel, each on one side of the board, aiming to get them to the last point – the 'home point' (Note: Bell (1979) calls it the home point, but coin de repos means rest corner.) or 'rest corner' (coin de repos) – and thus win the game.

An originality of the game is that you have to roll two dice, but only play the lower one. This changes the probabilities: out of the 36 possible throws, there are 11 for the ace, 9 for two, 7 for three, 5 for four, 3 for five and only one for six. The lower numbers are more likely to occur than the higher ones and it is therefore more difficult to move bring a man to the home point than if a single die were used. In addition, it introduces an element of tactics in that the closer a man is to an objective the more chance there is of reaching it.

== Rules ==
The following rules are based on those published by Fallavel (1715):

Each player has three counters or 'men' placed outside the board at the same end or on the same end rail. There are no men on the board itself at the start.

Players roll the dice to decide who goes first. (Note: Fallavel does not state the procedure. Lalanne says that each player rolls one die and the player with the higher die goes first.) The dice were meant to be thrown hard against the opponent's rail.

In turn, players roll two dice and advance a man on their side by a number of points equal to the lower of the two dice. The higher die is never used. Movement is subject to the following restrictions:

1. Two men may not occupy the same point.
2. One man may not pass over another.
3. If a man arrives on a point directly opposite an opposing man, the latter is 'hit' and is sent back off the board to its starting position. (Note: According to Lêchalet (1979), a man who has been hit may be re-entered whenever the player chooses, while Bell (1975) states that it has to re-enter at the next throw if possible. Fallavel is silent on this point.)
4. A man cannot go beyond the last point: it must reached the home point by the exact number of pips on the die.

It is compulsory to play if possible, but if no move can be made, it is forfeited and the turn passes to the opponent.

A man occupying the home point cannot be hit. The home point is the only one that may be occupied by more than one man. The winner is the first to bring his three men to the home point.

== La Course en Ligne Droite ==
Lêchalet (1979) publishes a variant under the name La Course en Ligne Droite ("Straight Line Race") with the following differences:

- Players only use one die each. This affects the game play in that, now, all numbers thrown have an equal probability.
- There is no restriction on men overtaking one another.
- There is no restriction on the number of men per point.
- A player failing to throw the exact score to finish must return the man to the start (i.e. off the board).

== See also ==
- Tables games

== Literature ==
- _ (1698), Le Jeu du Trictrac, 1st edn. Paris: Charpentier.
- Bell, R.C. (1975). Discovering Backgammon. Haverfordwest: Shire. ISBN 0852634749
- Bell, R.C. (1979). Board and Table Games from Many Civilizations, revised edn. [Originally published in 1960 in 2 volumes as Board and Table Games by OUP] NY: Dover. ISBN 0486238555
- Fallavel, M.J.M.F. (1715). Le Jeu du trictrac, Enrichi De Figures Avec les Jeux du Revertier, du Tourne-Case, des Dames Rabatues, du Plain, et du Toc. 3rd revised, corrected and expanded edn. Paris: Charpentier, pp. 63–77.
- Lêchalet, Jacques (1987) Le Jacquet, Le Backgammon, Le Tric Trac, Le Solitaire, 2nd edn. (1st edn. 1979), Bornemann. 55 pp. ISBN 9782851820778
