= Tavla =

Turkish tables game

Tavla is a Turkish tables game. It often refers to the western game of Backgammon and to tables games in general. However, it also refers to the more traditional game described here. Note that Turkish sources may refer to western Backgammon as "Modern Tavla" to distinguish it. The Persian name for the game is Takhteh or Takhte.

== Overview ==
Tables games are an ancient family of games, the best known modern example of which is Backgammon.

Traditional Tavla uses the same setup as modern Backgammon and the aim general mode of play are the same. The main differences are:

- The player who wins the opening roll, re-rolls the dice for the first turn. This changes the opening theory a little, since doubles are possible in the very first roll.
- Hit-and-run does not apply in a player's home board.
- The winner scores 1 point for a normal win and 2 for a gammon.
- There is no backgammon.
- There is no doubling cube.

== Bibliography ==
- Yazar (ed.) (2023). Backgammon: Modern Tavlaya Giriş ve Acilis Hamleleri. Alparslan Goktay.
