= Tables game =

Class of board game

Tables family
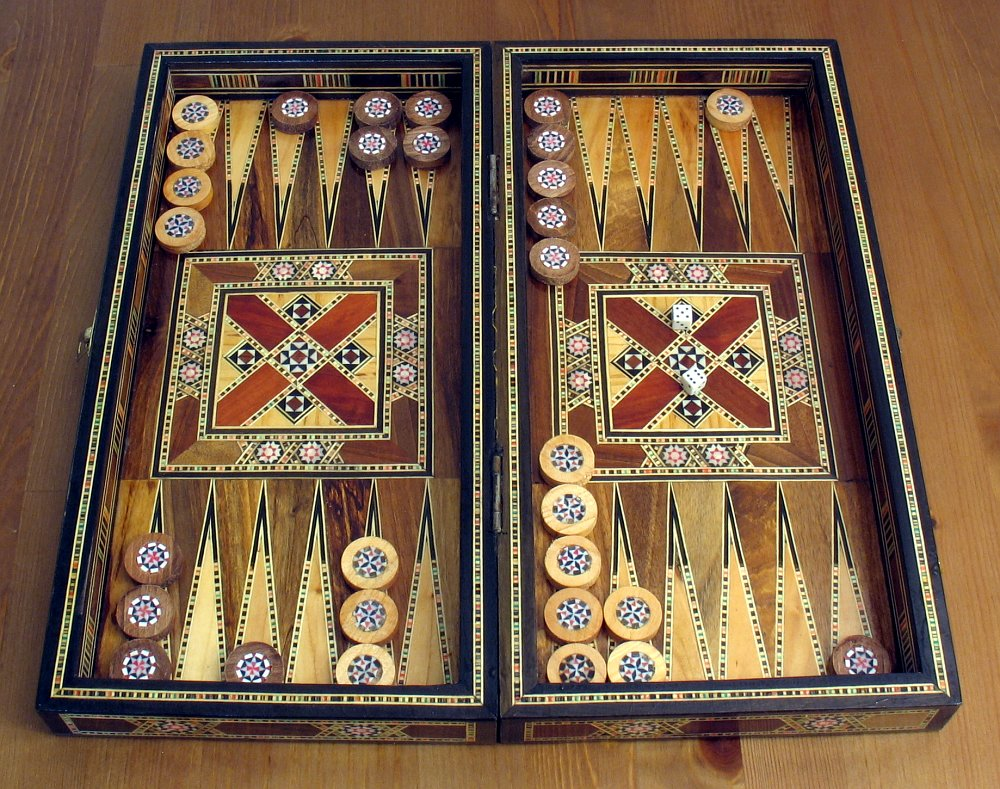
- A tables board from Lebanon
- Years active: c. 3rd millennium BC to present
- Players: 2 (or more in some variants)
- Setup time: < 1 minute
- Playing time: 5–30 minutes
- Chance: Dice
- Skills: Strategy, probability

Tables games are a class of board game that includes backgammon and which are played on a tables board, typically with two rows of 12 vertical markings called points. Players roll dice to determine the movement of pieces. Tables games are among the oldest known board games, and many different varieties are played throughout the world. They are called "tables" games because the boards consist of four quadrants or "tables". The vast majority are race games, the tables board representing a linear race track with start and finish points, the aim being to be first to the finish line, but the characteristic features that distinguish tables games from other race games are that they are two-player games using a large number of pieces, usually fifteen per player. Tables games should not be confused with table games, which are casino gambling games like roulette or blackjack.

== Name ==
The word "tables" is derived from the Latin tabula which primarily meant 'board' or 'plank', but also referred to this genre of game. From its plural form, tabulae, come the names in other languages for this family of games including the Anglo-Saxon toefel, German Tafel, Greek tavli, Italian tavoli, Scandinavian tafl, Spanish tablas and, of course, English and French tables. The reason for the plural is twofold: first, that a tables board comprises four separate quadrants which are a feature of the play; and second, that tabulae also came to refer to the individual pieces – "tablemen" or "men" for short – used in the various games.

== Definition ==
Most, but not all, (Note: For example, Trictrac, is not a race game per se.) tables games are a type of race game. They are characterised as being:

- Played by two players and hence bilaterally symmetrical.
- Multiplex games; i.e., players have a large number of pieces.
- Played on a rectangular board with players sitting on the long sides.
- Played on a board with four quarters known as tables, hence the name.

== Types ==
Tables games may be classified by movement or by tactics.

=== Movement ===
Parlett (1999) identifies three different modes of movement in tables games:

==== Games without movement ====
A small number of tables games involve no actual movement of pieces around the board. Instead pieces are entered or borne off or both, the aim being to be the first player to do so. Examples include Alfonso's Los Doze Canes also called Los Doze Hermanos, the English games of Doublets and Catch Dolt, the French games Renette, Tables Rabattues and Paumecary, the Icelandic game of Ofanfelling and the Levantine game of Eureika. Most of these games are simple pursuits suitable for children.

==== Games of contrary movement ====
This is the group to which Backgammon belongs. Some start with all pieces off the board, others with a fixed starting layout, but the aim in every case is to race them around the board in opposite directions and be first to bear them off. The group also includes Acey Deucey, known as Gegenpuff in German-speaking countries, Plakota, the "English Game", the Spanish games of Emperador, Quinze Tablas and Todas Tablas, the Italian games of Tavole Reales and Testa, and the French games of Tieste, Impérial and Trictrac.

==== Games of parallel movement ====
Like other members of the tables family, games in this last group are often mistaken for Backgammon or assumed to be its variants, yet the direction of movement and hence play is quite different. Players move in the same direction around the board and that direction is always anticlockwise. The group includes the old German games of Langer Puff (known confusingly in English as German or Russian Backgammon) and Buffa, the Italian game of Buffa Cortese, the Spanish games of Laquet and Pareia de Entrada, the continental game of Verquere, French Jacquet, Turkish Moultezim and a curious Icelandic game called Chase the Girls.

=== Tactics ===
Papahristou & Refanidis (2013) categorise tables games by the type of attacking tactics permitted during the game:

==== Hitting games ====
This is the standard tactic in games of contrary movement such as Backgammon where players move their pieces in opposing directions. In a hitting game, the players may hit enemy blots off the board. To do this a point must be occupied by only one opposing piece – this is called a blot – and the attacking player must move a piece onto that point. The blot is "hit" or "knocked off" the board and is usually placed on the bar between the two halves of the board.

==== Pinning games ====
Pinning games are also games of contrary movement. However, no hitting is allowed. Instead, the attacking player may pin a blot by moving a piece onto the same point. The blot is not removed from the board, but is trapped and not permitted to move until the covering man is moved off. Plakoto is an example of a pinning game.

==== Running games ====
A running game is a game in which no hitting or pinning is allowed and the game is essentially a race to bear off all one's pieces first. Points occupied even by one enemy man are blocked to the other side. They are usually games of parallel movement, like Fevga, where players move around the board in the same direction, but some, like Gioul, are games of contrary movement where players race their pieces past one another in opposing directions.

== History ==
Numerous archaeological discoveries witness to game boards and artefacts bearing a strong resemblance to those used in race games and ancient texts give an idea of their play in some cases. These bilateral race games may well be the ancestors of the tables game family. They include the Alea, Dogs and Jackals, Duodecim Scripta, the Game of Twenty, Grammai, the Royal Game of Ur, Senet and Nard.

The history of tables games may be divided into different periods of development:

- Pre-classical period: (Note: Parlett says "prehistoric" but means that period of ancient history before the 8th century BC.) Grammai and other early race games
- Classical period: notably Ludus duodecim scriptorum and Tabula
- Nard period: from its invention or earliest appearance in Southwestern Asia (or Persia) before AD 800
- Tables period: tables games from their arrival in Spain or Italy from the Arabic world around the turn of the first millennium
- Modern period: the rise of more sophisticated games from the 15th century onwards including Trictrac and Backgammon

=== Pre-classical period ===
==== Persia ====
The history of tables games and their race game forerunners can be traced back nearly 5,000 years to Persia, where excavations in 2006 at the Burnt City unearthed objects that appear to be part of a game set dating to around 3000 BC. These artefacts include an ebony board, two dice and 60 pieces, with the playing fields represented by the coils of a serpent. The rules of this game, like others found in Egypt, have yet to be discovered. It is, however, made from ebony, a material more likely to be found in the Indian subcontinent, which indicates such board games may be more widespread than once thought.

==== Mesopotamia ====
Prior to the Persian discovery, the oldest board game sets had been found in Ur and are thought to have been created 100 to 200 years later. They were used for the Royal Game of Ur, played in ancient Mesopotamia. These finds are significant because of two Babylonian tablets with cuneiform descriptions of the game played on these game sets, the later one dated c. 177 BC and the other one dating to several centuries earlier. These represent the oldest rule sets of any race game and clearly show this Sumerian game to be ancestral to the tables game family.

==== Egypt ====
Another ancient race game was Senet, played by the ancient Egyptians around the same time. Board fragments that could be Senet have been found in First Dynasty burials in Egypt, c. 3100 BC, but the first painting of this ancient game is from the Third Dynasty (c. 2686–2613 BC). People are depicted playing Senet in a painting in the tomb of Rashepes, as well as other tombs dating to c. 2500 BC. The oldest complete Senet boards date to the Middle Kingdom.

Senet was played in neighbouring cultures, probably arriving there through trade links with the Egyptians. It has been found in the Levant at sites such as Arad and Byblos, as well as in Cyprus. Because of the local practice of making games out of stone, more Senet games have survived in Cyprus than in Egypt.

=== Classical period ===
The situation in Zeno's game of tabula when he had an unlucky dice throw

==== Byzantine Empire ====
Tabula (also called Alea, Tablē or Tάβλι (Note: Meaning 'table' or 'board' in Byzantine Greek)), is the oldest identifiable tables game. It is described in an epigram of Byzantine Emperor Zeno (AD 476–491). It had the typical tables board layout with 24 rectangular points, 12 on each side. Each player had 15 men and used cubical dice with sides numbered one to six. The object of the game was to be the first to bear off all of one's men. Modern backgammon follows similar rules to those of tabula, the key differences being that tabula uses an extra die (three rather than two), there is no doubling die or bar, and all the tablemen start off the board. Interestingly, the rules in backgammon for re-entering pieces from the bar are the same as those in tabula for entering pieces from off the board, along with those for hitting a blot, and bearing off. The name τάβλη is still used for tables games in Greece, where they are frequently played in town plateias and cafes. The epigram of Zeno describes a particularly bad dice roll the emperor had for his given position. Zeno, who was white, had a stack of seven men, three stacks of two men and two blots, men that stood alone on a point and were therefore in danger of being put outside the board by an incoming opposing man. Zeno threw the three dice with which the game was played and obtained 2, 5 and 6. The rules meant that Zeno could not move to a space occupied by two opposing (black) men. The black and white tablemen were so distributed on the points that the only way to use all three results, as required by the game rules, was to break the three stacks of two men into blots, exposing them and ruining the game for Zeno.

==== Roman Empire ====
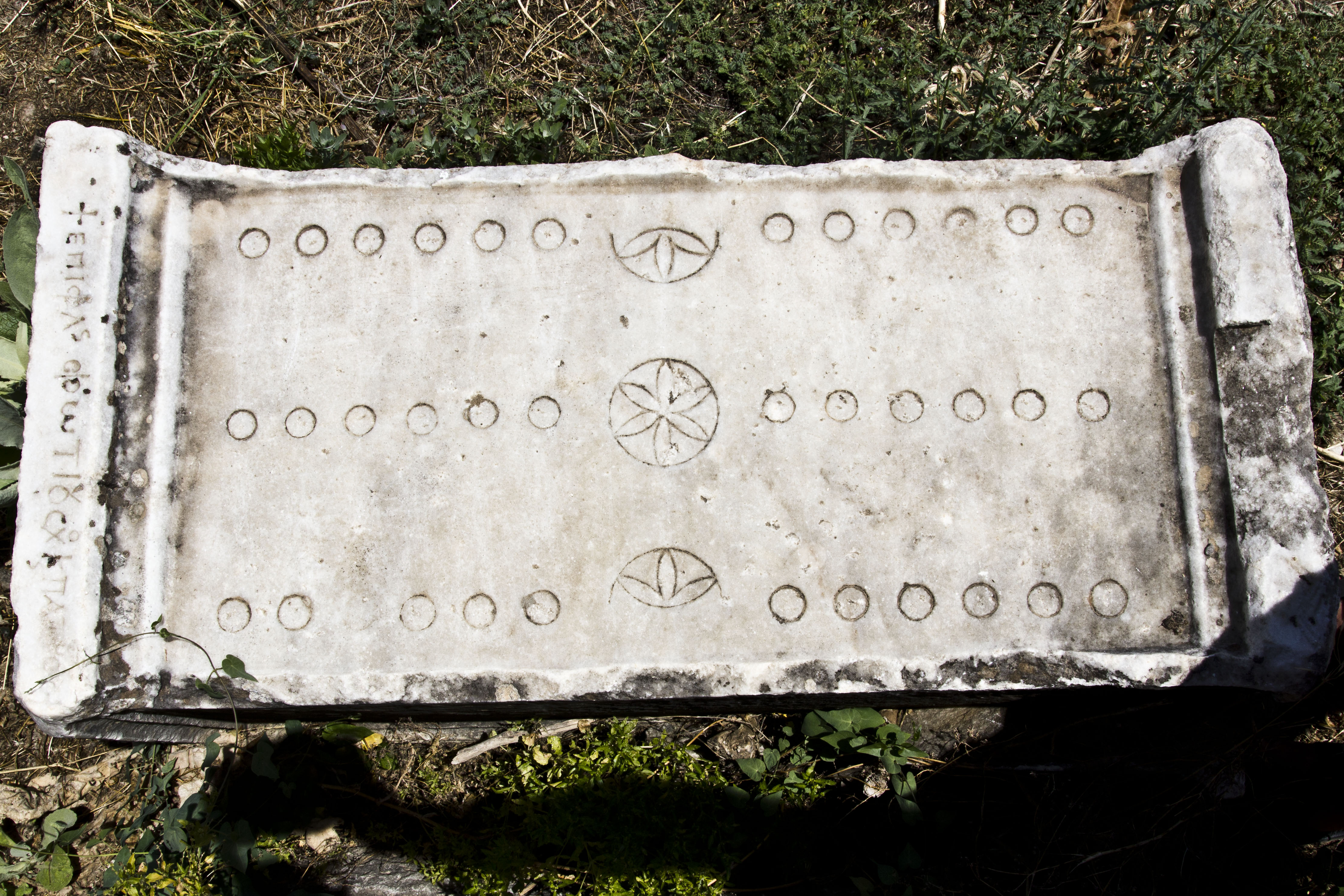
Roman Ludus duodecim scriptorum board from the 2nd century, Aphrodisias

The τάβλι of Zeno's time is believed to be a direct descendant of the earlier Roman Ludus duodecim scriptorum ("Game of Twelve Lines") with the board's middle row of points removed, and only the two outer rows remaining. Duodecim scriptorum used a board with three rows of 12 points each, with the 15 men being moved in opposing directions by the two players across three rows according to the roll of the three cubical dice. Little specific text about the play of Duodecim scriptorum has survived; it may have been related to the older Ancient Greek dice game Kubeia. The earliest known mention of the game is in Ovid's Ars Amatoria ("The Art of Love"), written between 1 BC and 8 AD. In Roman times, this game was also known as Alea, and a likely apocryphal Latin story linked this name, and the game, to a Trojan soldier named Alea.

=== Nard period (Middle Ages) ===
==== Middle East ====
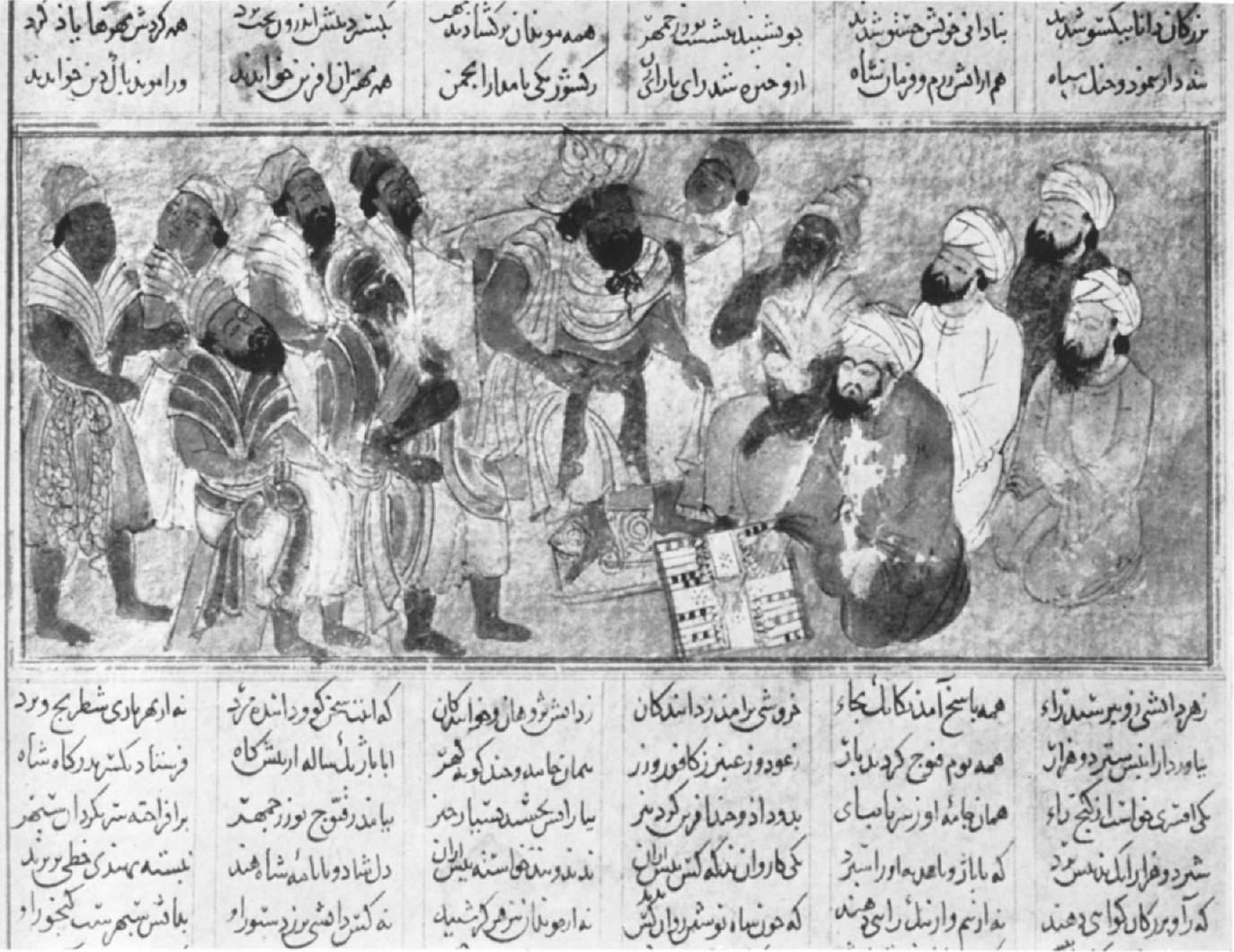
Burzoe demonstrates the game of nard to the Indian Rajas

In the 11th century Shahnameh, the Persian poet Ferdowsi credits Borzuya with the invention of the game of Nard in the 6th century. He describes an encounter between Borzuya and a Raja visiting from India. The Raja introduces the game of chess, and Borzuya demonstrates Nard, played with dice made from ivory and teak.

Meanwhile, Persian tradition places the invention of nard in the 3rd or even 6th century AD. The name of the game nard is an abbreviated version of the original Persian name nardšir. The Middle-Persian text, Kār-nāmag ī Ardaxšēr ī Pāpakān, associates the invention of nard with Ardashir I (r. 224–41), the founder of the Sasanian dynasty, whereas in the Middle Persian narrative Wičārišn ī čatrang ud nihišn ī nēw-ardaxšēr (Explanation of Chess and the Invention of Nardshir) it is Bozorgmehr Bokhtagan, the vizier of Khosrow I (r. 531–79), who is credited with the invention of the game.

==== East Asia ====
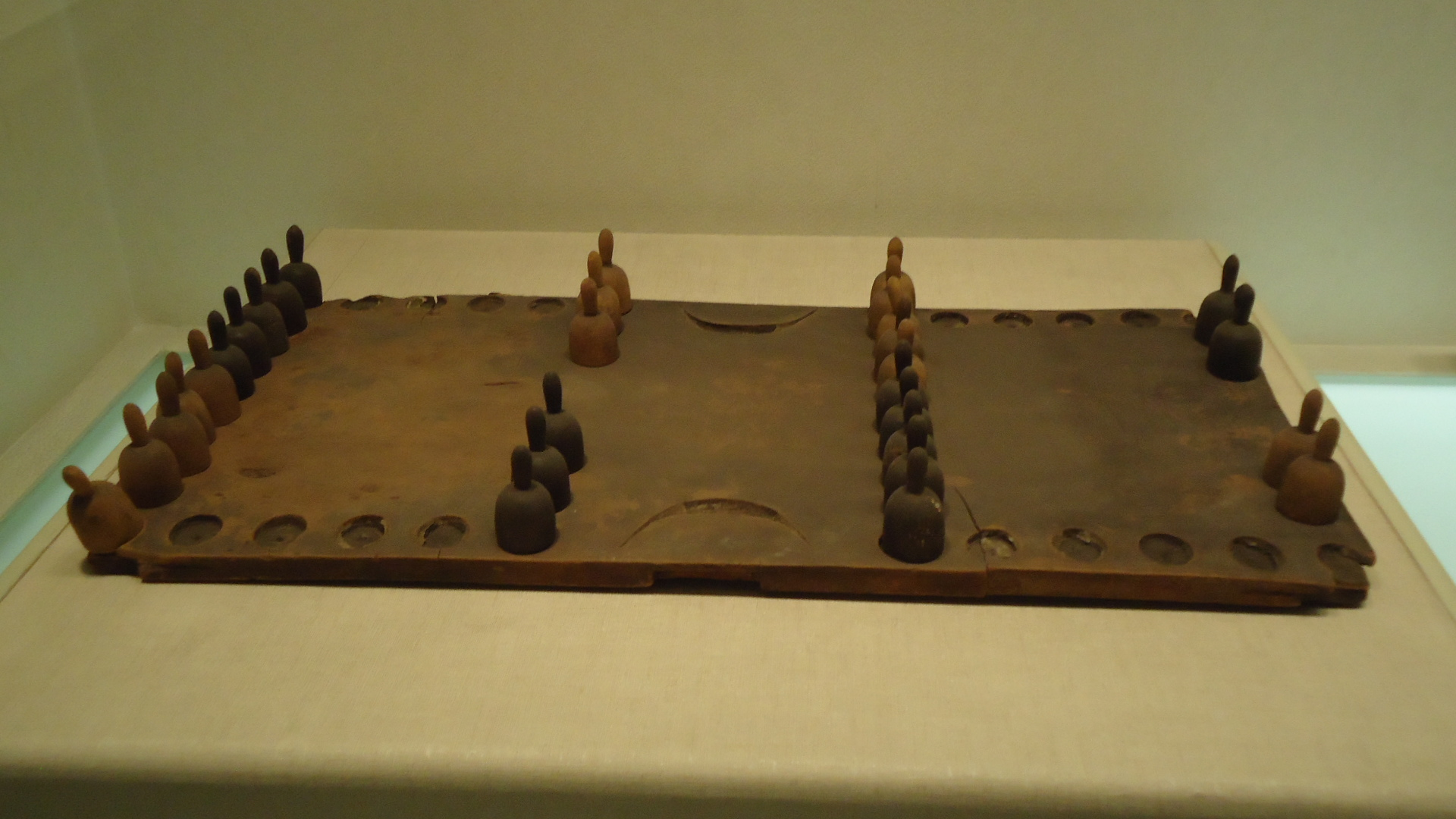
Table game set from around the 10th century, China

Nard was popular in China for a time and was known as "shuanglu" (雙陸/双陆, shuānglù). Shuanglu came from western India to China during the Wei dynasty and was a significant table game during the Liang, Chen, Sui, Tang, and Qi dynasties. The book Pǔ Shuāng (譜雙) written during the Southern Song period (1127–1279) recording over ten variants. Over time it was replaced by other games such as xiangqi (Chinese chess).

In Japan, ban-sugoroku is thought to have been brought from China in the 6th century, and is mentioned in Genji monogatari. As a gambling game, it was made illegal several times. In the early Edo era, a new and fast gambling game called Chō-han appeared and sugoroku quickly dwindled. By the 13th century, the board game Go, originally played only by the aristocracy, had become popular among the general public.

In Korea, a similar game exists known as Ssang-ryuk.

==== Europe ====
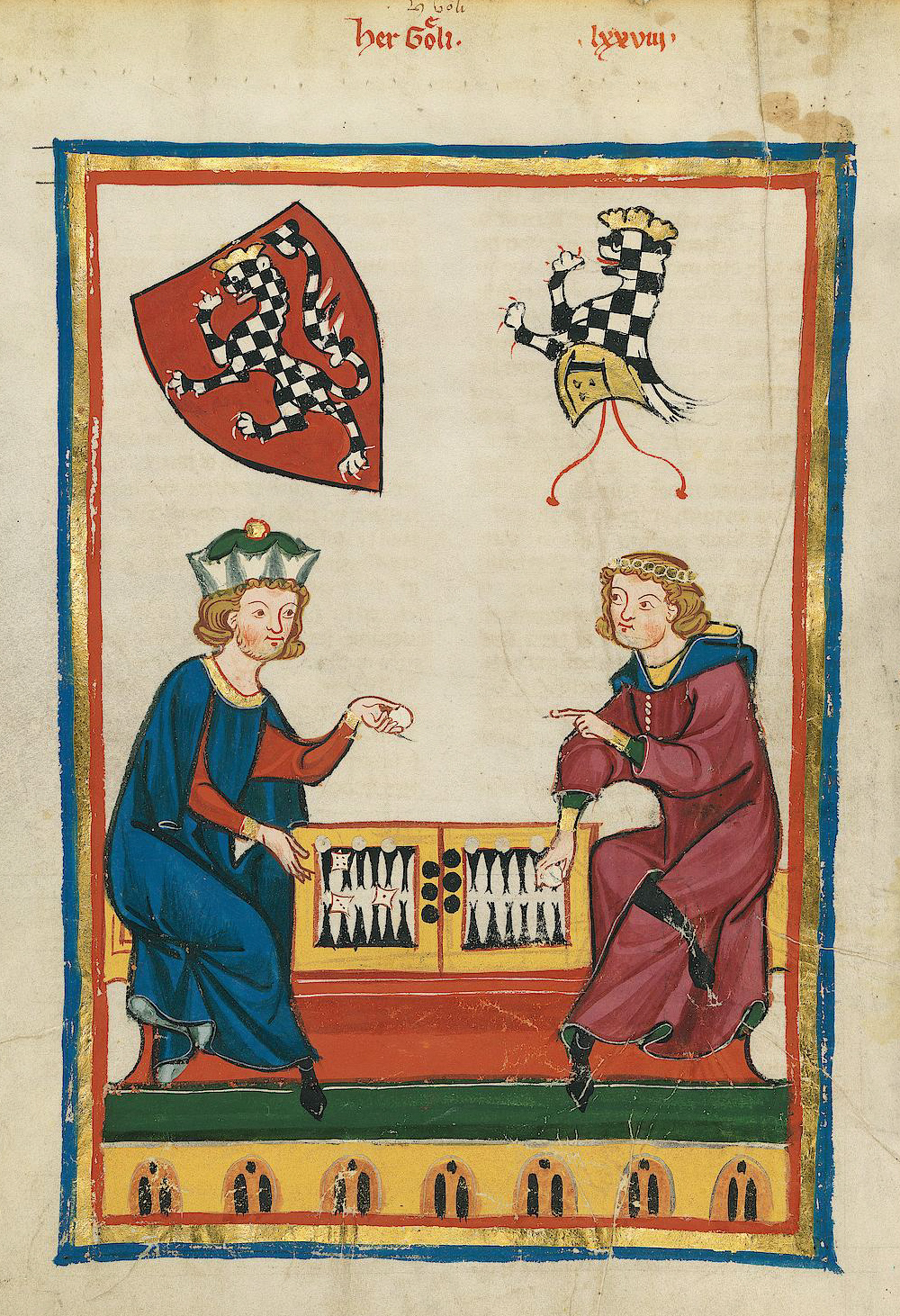
The poet Herr Goeli playing, from the 14th century Codex Manesse

In English, the word "tables" is derived from Latin tabula. Its first use referring to board games documented by the Oxford English Dictionary was circa AD 700.

The Gloucester tabula set, Discovered on the site of Gloucester Castle in 1983, with its obelisk shaped points provides a potential transitional phase between the Roman square points, and the triangular points that were common in the 13th century.

The jeux de tables ('Games of Tables') first appeared in France during the 11th century and became a favorite pastime of gamblers. In 1254, Louis IX issued a decree prohibiting his court officials and subjects from playing. Tables games were played in Germany in the 12th century, and had reached Iceland by the 13th century. In Spain, the Alfonso X manuscript Libro de los juegos, completed in 1283, describes rules for a number of dice and table games in addition to its extensive discussion of chess.

Mediaeval tables should not be confused with Tafl, an unrelated class of board games (albeit linguistically related) played in medieval Scandinavia. Tâb and tablan (as well as the related games sáhkku and daldøs) may, on the other hand, be descendants of tabula.

=== Modern period ===
==== Europe ====
By the 17th century, table games had spread to Sweden. A wooden board and counters were recovered from the wreck of the Vasa among the belongings of the ship's officers. Tables games appear widely in paintings of this period, mainly those of Dutch and German painters, such as Van Ostade, Jan Steen, Hieronymus Bosch, and Bruegel. Some surviving artworks are Cardsharps by Caravaggio (the tables board is in the lower left) and The Triumph of Death by Pieter Bruegel the Elder (the tables board is in the lower right). Others include Hell (Bosch) and Interior of an Inn by Jan Steen.

==== The rise of Backgammon ====
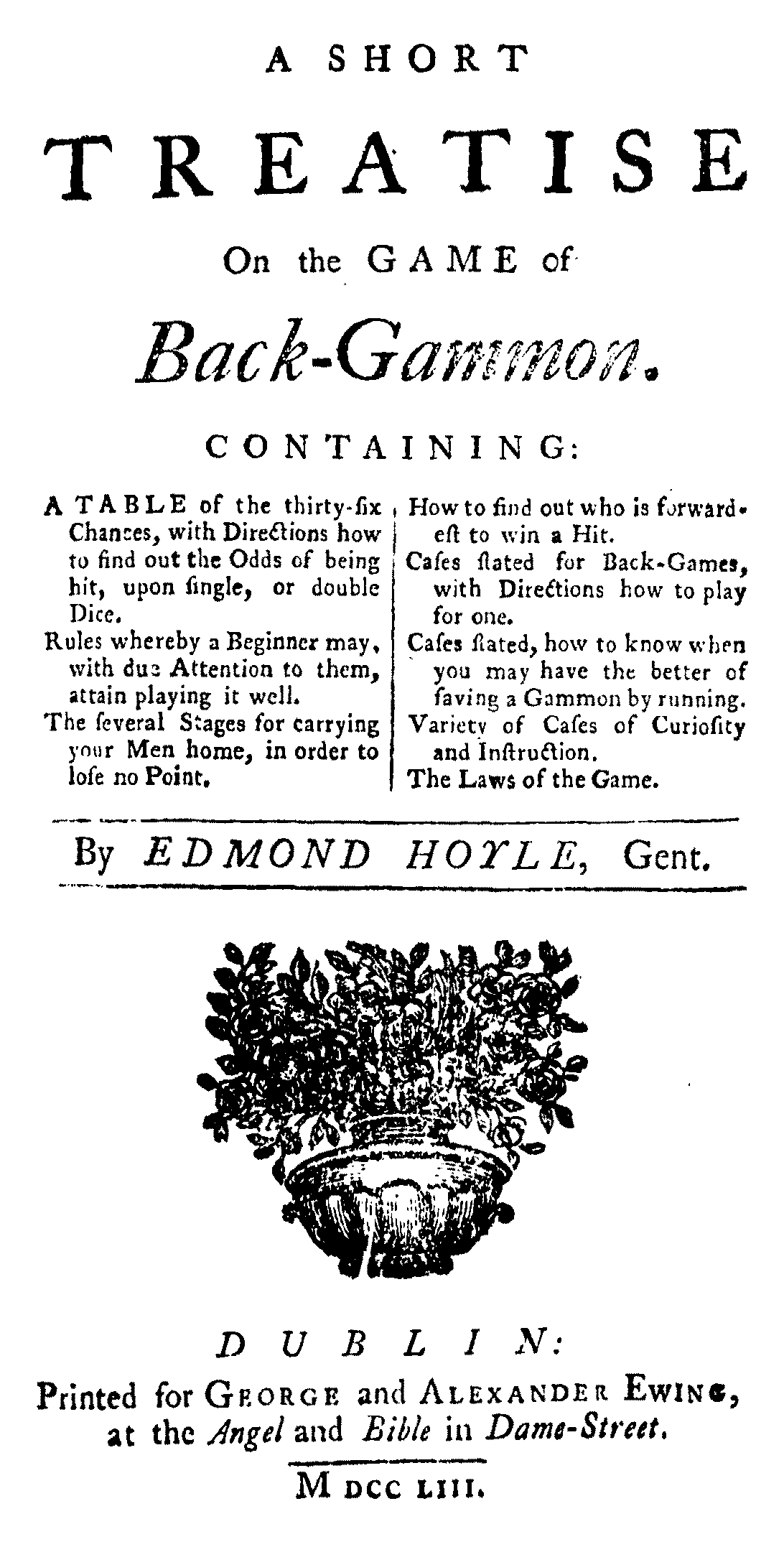
A Short Treatise on the Game of Back-Gammon, by Edmond Hoyle

The earliest known mention of Backgammon was in a letter dated 1635 and it was a variant of the popular mediaeval Anglo-Scottish game of Irish. By the 19th century it had superseded other tables games in popularity and spread abroad to Europe and America. The scoring rules have changed over time and a doubling cube added that enables players to raise the stakes.

Backgammon's predecessor was the tables game of Irish, which was popular at the Scottish court of James IV and considered "the more serious and solid game" when Backgammon began to emerge in the first half of the 17th century. In the 16th century, Elizabethan laws and church regulations had prohibited playing tables in England, but by the 18th century, tables games were on the rise again and Backgammon had superseded Irish and become popular among the English clergy. Edmond Hoyle published A Short Treatise on the Game of Back-Gammon in 1753; this described rules and strategy for the game and was bound together with a similar text on whist.

In English, the word "backgammon" is most likely derived from "back" and Middle English: gamen, meaning "game" or "play". The earliest mention of the game, which was under the name of Baggammon, was by James Howell in a letter dated 1635. (Note: The fact that this is the earliest mention is stated in Fiske (1905), p. 285.) Meanwhile, the first use documented by the Oxford English Dictionary was in 1650. In 1666, it is reported that the "old name for backgammon used by Shakespeare and others" was Tables. However, it is clear from Willughby that "tables" was a generic name and that the phrase "playing at tables" was used in a similar way to "playing at cards".

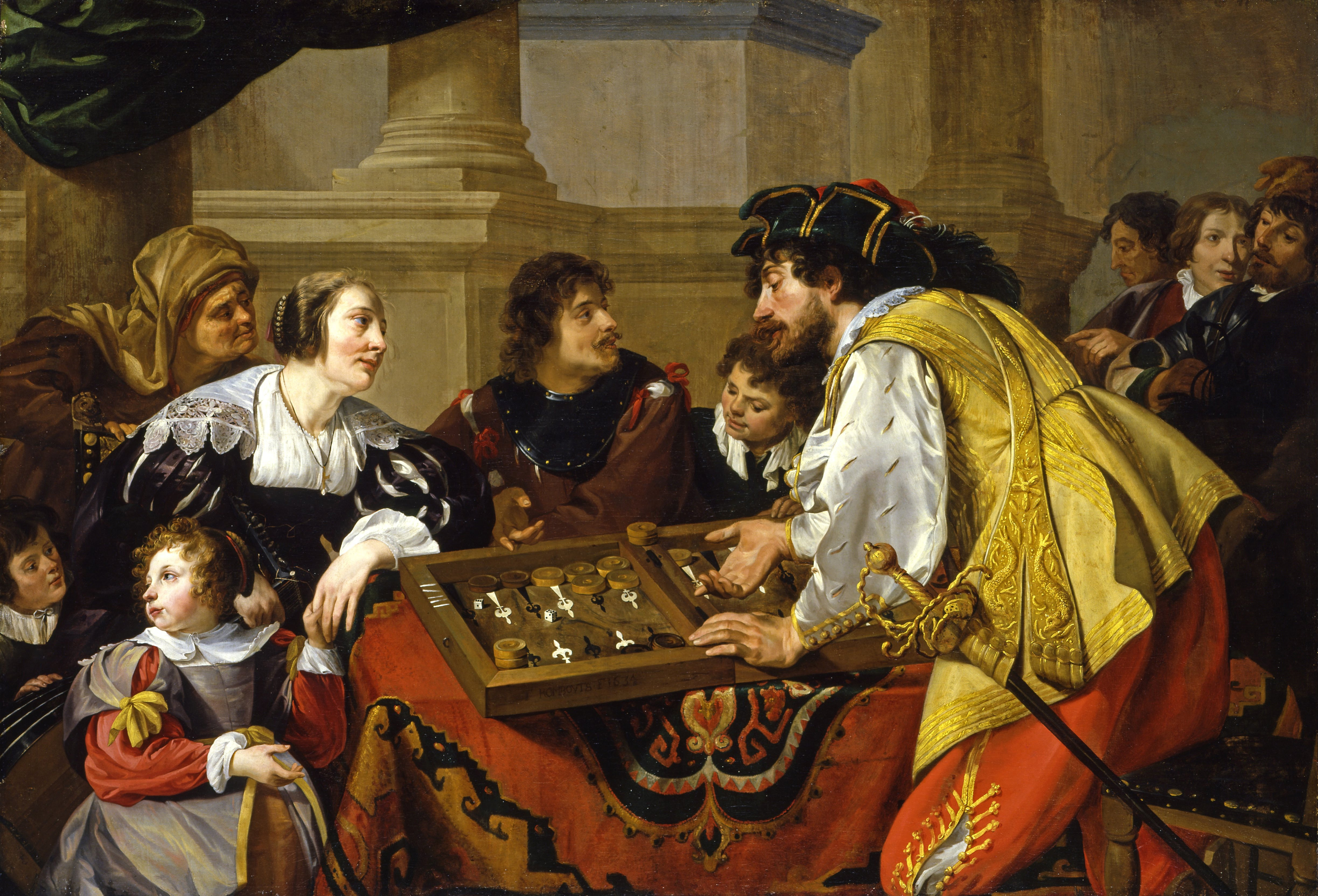
The Backgammon Players by Theodoor Rombouts, 1634

The most recent major development in backgammon was the addition of the doubling cube. It was first introduced in the 1920s in New York City among members of gaming clubs on the Lower East Side. The cube required players not only to select the best move in a given position, but also to estimate the probability of winning from that position, transforming backgammon into the expected value-driven game played in the 20th and 21st centuries.

The popularity of backgammon surged in the mid-1960s, in part due to the charisma of Prince Alexis Obolensky who became known as "The Father of Modern Backgammon". "Obe", as he was called by friends, co-founded the International Backgammon Association, which published a set of official rules. He also established the World Backgammon Club of Manhattan, devised a backgammon tournament system in 1963, then organized the first major international backgammon tournament in March 1964, which attracted royalty, celebrities and the press. The game became a huge fad and was played on college campuses, in discothèques and at country clubs; stockbrokers and bankers began playing at conservative men's clubs. People young and old all across the country dusted off their boards and "checkers". Cigarette, liquor and car companies began to sponsor tournaments, and Hugh Hefner held backgammon parties at the Playboy Mansion. Backgammon clubs were formed and tournaments were held, resulting in a World Championship promoted in Las Vegas in 1967.

Most recently, the United States Backgammon Federation (USBGF) was organized in 2009 to re-popularize the game in the United States. Board and committee members include many of the top players, tournament directors and writers in the worldwide backgammon community. The USBGF has recently created a Standards of Ethical Practice to address issues which tournament rules fail to touch.

== Tables games by region ==
=== Europe ===
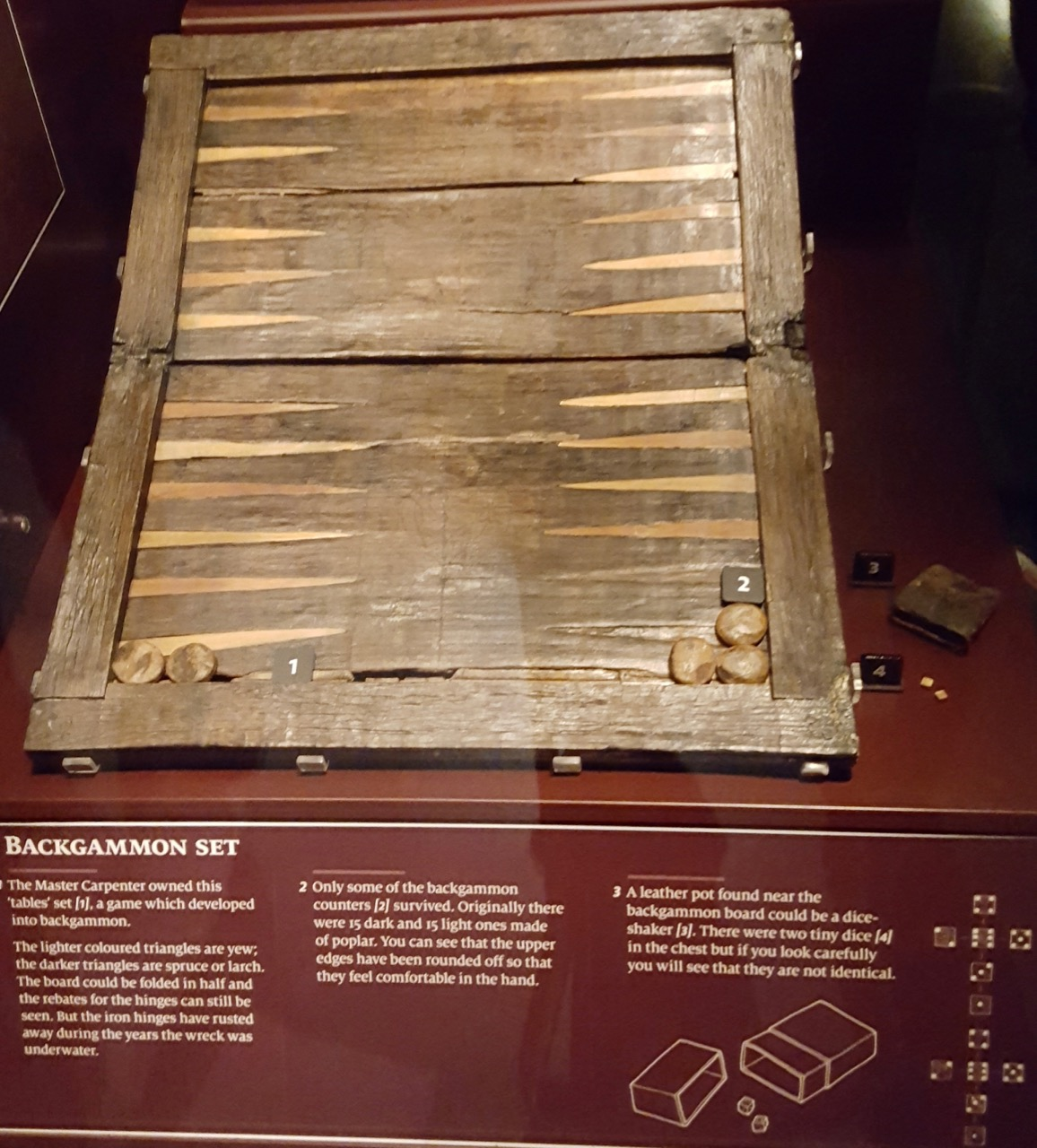
A tables board found in the shipwreck of the Mary Rose (1545)

==== France ====
Trictrac was the classic French tables game of the 17th and 18th centuries in the same way that backgammon that now is in the English-speaking world. There are two main forms of the game, le Grand Trictrac and le Petit Trictrac. However, it is not a race game; rather the main aim is to score points.

In Trictrac, the starting point is called a talon, the points, or fleches, are numbered to 12 on both sides of the board, with the 12th point on either side called the coin de repos, or, simply, coin. The 11th point (on either side) is often called le case d'écolier, or 'schoolboy's point' (case meaning 'square', literally) after the tendency of inexperienced players to rush to this point too soon in the game. Statistically, the most difficult points in the game to reach aside from the coins are the 8th points, and they are named les fleches de diable, or 'the Devil's points', for this reason. The home boards are referred to as the jan de retour by either player. Doubles are treated as two identical numbers.

Trictrac was superseded by the much simpler game of Jacquet during the 19th century, a race game with a number of distinctive features. First, players circulated the board in the same direction rather than in opposing directions. Second, players could not move the majority of their pieces until the first piece, the "courier" or "postilion", had reached the final quadrant. Jacquet was largely ousted by Anglo-American games in the 1960s, but its rules are still published and boards are still manufactured.

Tourne Case is another old French tables game and more one of chance than skill. Using a tables board, each player only takes 3 pieces. The aim is to enter them onto the board using the throws of the dice and be first to move all 3 to the "home corner" (coin de repos) on the 12th point of the board. The men may not pass over one another nor may there be more than one on a point except in the home corner. If a man moves to a point opposite that of an opposing man, the latter is "hit". It must be removed from the board and re-entered from the start.

==== Greece and Cyprus ====
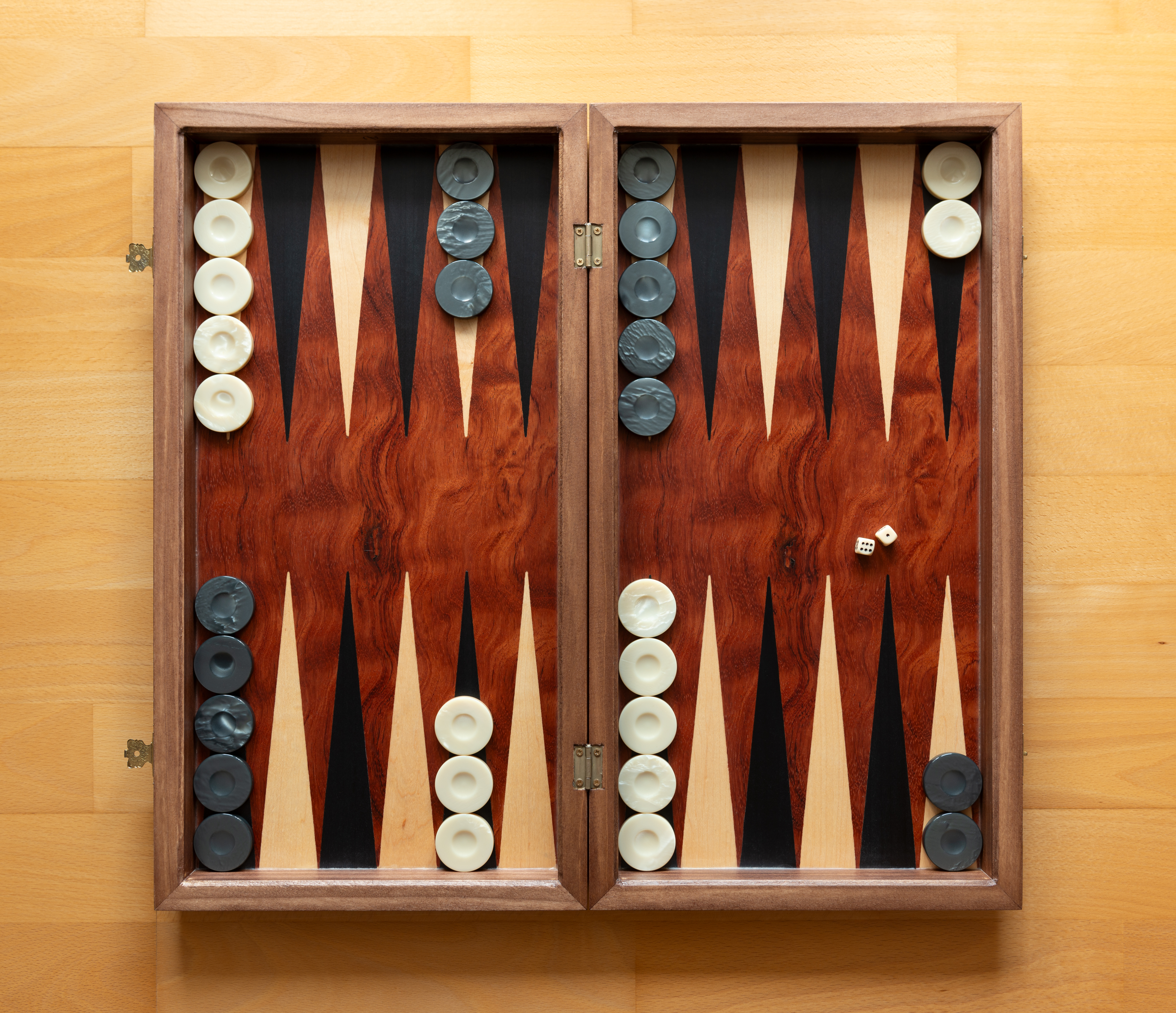
Traditional Greek Tavli board made from Rosewood with checkers made of Galalith.

Tables games are popular among the Greeks. These games are called Tavli, derived in Byzantine times from the Latin word tabula. A game of the tables family called Tavli (Byzantine Greek: τάβλι) is described in an epigram of the Byzantine Emperor Zeno (AD 476–481). The games of Tavli most commonly played are:

- Portes has no doubling cube, and players only win double (called diplo, Greek for "double"), not triple, when a player bears off all the counters while the opponent has yet to bear off any and has still counters on the winner's home board or on the bar. (Note: Winning double in Backgammon occurs when the player bears off all the counters while the opponent has yet to bear any off.)
- Plakoto is very similar to Mahbusa or tapa. It has some general similarities with Portes, but with a different opening layout of the pieces and blots are pinned (so they cannot move) instead of being hit.
- Fevga is similar to Narde or the Turkish variant Moultezim. It is a running game of parallel movement; players moving in the same direction. There is not hitting or pinning and a point is blocked to the opponent even when occupied by a single piece.

The three games are normally played consecutively, in three-, five- or seven-point matches. Before starting a match, each player rolls 1 die, and the player with the highest roll picks up both dice and re-rolls (i.e. it is possible to roll doubles for the opening move). Players use the same pair of dice in turns. After the first game, the winner of the previous game starts first. Each game counts as 1 point, if the opponent has borne off at least 1 stone, otherwise 2 points. There is no doubling cube. Tavli is considered the national board game of Cyprus and Greece.

Other Greek tables games include:

- Gul or Multezim is Fevga with the feature that, on a double, one has to play all doubles subsequently till the 6–6. If a dice throw cannot be fulfilled in any way, his opponent takes the turn for the remaining moves of that throw.
- Asodio is a game where all pieces are off the board at the outset and players enter either by rolling doubles or an Ace-Deuce combination.
- Sfaktes means "slayers".
- Evraiko (Jewish), a much simpler game depending entirely on luck with no room for skill.

==== Romania ====
In Romania, tablă (meaning "board", cognate of the Latin tabula) has two variations: there is no doubling cube and a backgammon counts only as a gammon (called marț). Matches are usually played to three points.

==== Sweden ====
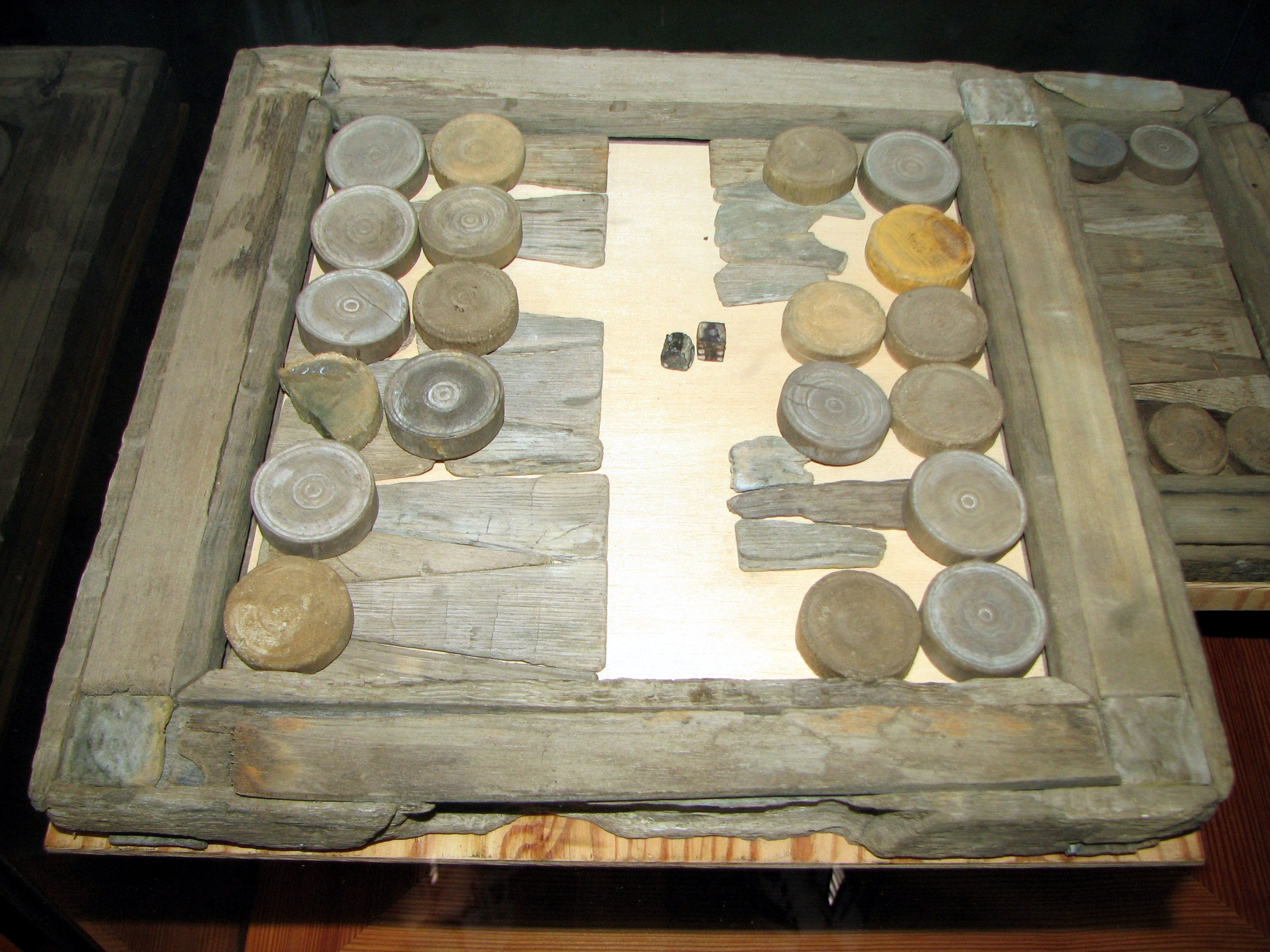
Tables board with counters recovered from the Swedish 17th century warship Vasa.

Bräde or svenskt brädspel ("Swedish Tables") is an elaborate version of the historical game verquere that is played in Sweden. Players start with all 15 of their counters on opposite corners of the board, and play around counter-clockwise. Besides bearing off, there are several other ways to win, such as arranging all of one's counters in certain pre-determined patterns, or by hitting so many counters that one's opponent can not bring them in again. Additional points are awarded for a victory while one's opponent has counters on the bar. Brädspel is played without the doubling cube. Interest in brädspel experienced a resurgence following the recovery of a 17th-century board from the wreck of the Vasa.

=== Far East ===
There are two games known as sugoroku (双六) in Japan. One more closely resembles Snakes and Ladders, while the other is played on a 24-point tables board, using standard tables equipment. The starting position is identical to that of backgammon, however it differs from most other tables variants in that the pieces are never borne off. Additionally, the use of primes is not permitted.

=== Middle East and Central Asia ===
Tables games are played widely in the Middle East and Central Asia. The most popular is known as Tawlah in Arabic (meaning "table"). This may represent a shared name origin with the Roman or Byzantine tables games. The game is called Takhte Nard in Iran. In Israel and many Arabic-speaking countries, it is known as Shesh Besh (pronounced Sheesh Beesh in Arabic), which is a rhyming combination shesh, meaning six in Hebrew, Aramaic and Northwest Semitic, and besh, meaning five in Turkish). It is also played by some Kurdish, Persian and Turkish speakers. Shesh besh is commonly used to refer to when a player scores a 5 and 6 at the same time on dice.

The name Nardshir comes from the Persian nard (Wooden block) and shir (lion) referring to the two type of pieces used in play. A common legend associates the game with the founder of the Sassanian dynasty, Ardashir I. The oldest known reference to the game is thought to be a passage in the Talmud.

Mahbusa means "imprisoned". Each player begins with 15 counters on his opponent's 24-point. If a counter is hit, it is not placed on the bar, but instead, the hitting piece is placed on top, and the point is then controlled by the hitting player. The counter which has been hit is 'imprisoned' and cannot be moved until the opponent removes his piece. Sometimes, a rule is used that requires a player to bring his first counter around to his home board before moving any others. In any case, a rapid advance to one's own home board is desirable, as imprisoning the opponent's counter there is highly advantageous. Mahbusa is similar to tapa.

Tawla 31 (meaning table 31) or Maghribiyya (meaning "Moroccan"). Similar to Mahbusa, each player begins with 15 counters on the opponent's 24-point. However, this game involves neither hitting not pinning. Instead, one or more pieces on a point act as a block. Moreover, a player must initially advance only one counter to the opponent's 'home board' before being able to move additional pieces. Tawla 31 or Maghribiyya is similar to Fevga.

Many of the early Arabic texts which refer to the game comment on the debate regarding the legality and morality of playing the game. This debate was settled by the eighth century when all four Muslim schools of jurisprudence declared the game to be Haraam (forbidden), however the game is still played today in many Arab countries.

In the modern Middle East, tables games are a common feature of coffeehouses. Today they continue to be commonly played in various forms in Iran, Iraq, Lebanon, Egypt, Syria, Jordan and throughout the Arab world.

A feature of tables play in some Arab countries is that Persian numbers, rather than Arabic ones, are called out by a player announcing his dice rolls.

==== Armenia ====
Nardi (Armenian: նարդի) is very popular among Armenians. The word is derived from Persian word nard (Persian: نرد). There are two games of Nardi commonly played:

Short Nardi: the local name for Backgammon; same setup and rules.

Long Nardi: A game that starts with all fifteen pieces are placed in a line on the 24-point and on the 11-point. The two players move their pieces in parallel directions, from the 24-point towards the 1-point, or home board. In Long Nardi, one piece by itself can block a point. There is no hitting in Long Nardi. The objective of the game is bearing all pieces off the board, and there is no doubling cube.

Nardi is included in the intangible cultural heritage list of Armenia.

==== Iran ====
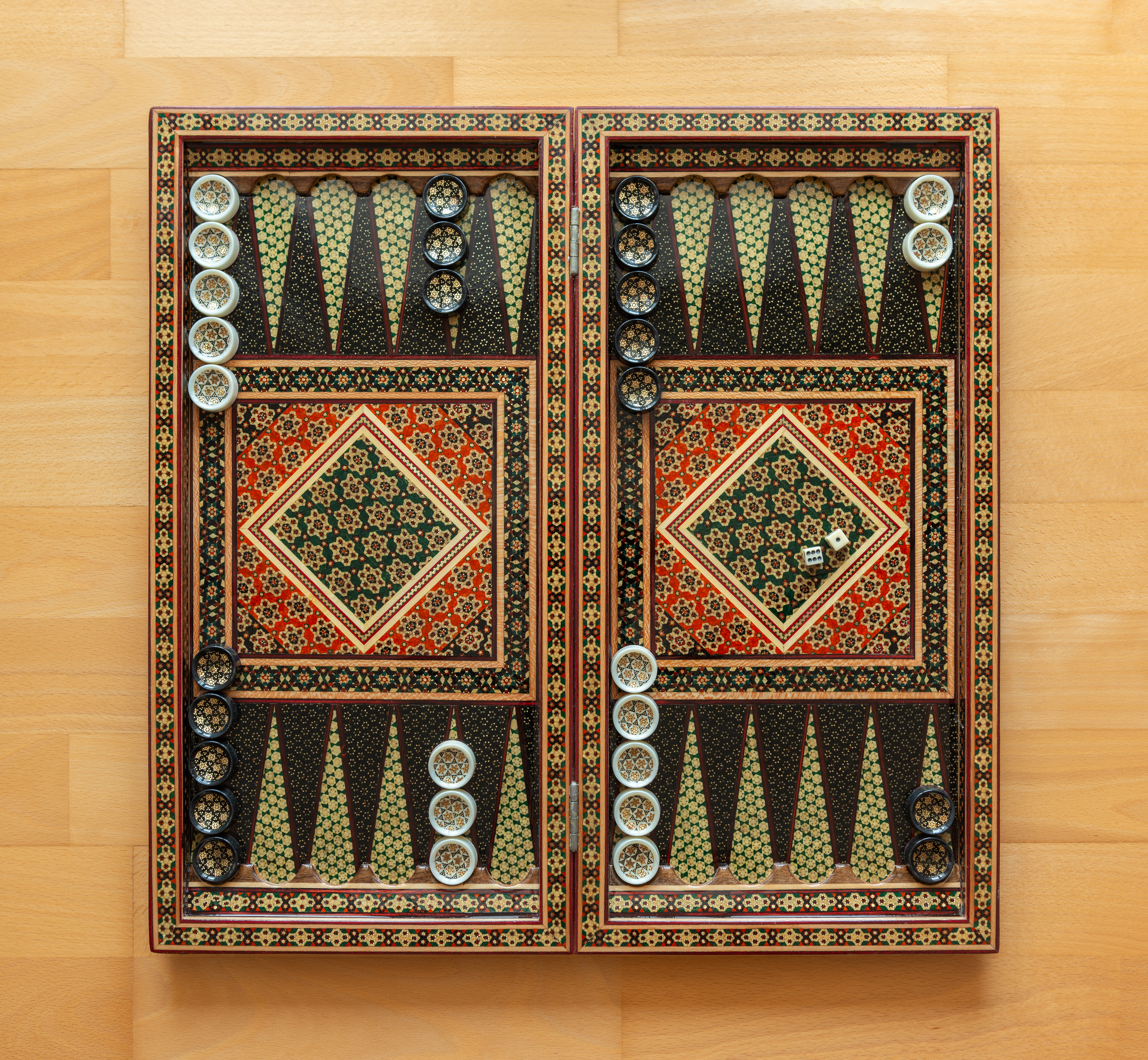
Persian Nard Board made in the Khatam marquetry technique.

Nard is the name for the Persian tables game. H. J. R. Murray details many versions of tables games; his description of modern Persian Nard has the same layout and scheme of movement as backgammon. He suggests that it may date back, perhaps in an older form, to 300–500 AD in the Babylonian Talmud, although others believe the Talmud references the Greek race game Kubeia.

People in the Iranian plateau and Caucasus region, especially in Azerbaijan, Iran, Armenia, Georgia, Uzbekistan and Russia, are very fond of playing narde. All 15 of a player's counters are initially positioned on his own 24-point, but there is a major difference. One is forbidden to put his counter at a point occupied by one's opponent's counter, so there is no hitting or imprisonment in the long narde game. The main strategy is to secure playing "big pairs" by one's own counter and prevent as much as possible doing the same by the opponent.

The game is known as "Fevga" in Greece, "Moultezim" in Turkey, Mahbusa in the Middle East and "Ifranjiah" or Frankish in Arabia. It can also be spelt as "Nard" or "Nardi".

A version known as short narde is a simplified form of Ifranjiah. In Georgia, ifranjiah is played as elsewhere, but called "nardi". In Georgia, Armenia, Azerbaijan and Russia many experienced players also play long narde, which some see as requiring deeper strategy.

One of the most famous narde championships is the championship of Azerbaijan – Gizil Zar – Golden Dawn. The winner is awarded with gold dice.

Gul bara, sometimes referred to as "Rosespring Backgammon" or "Crazy Narde", is a tables game in which there is no hitting.

==== Turkey ====
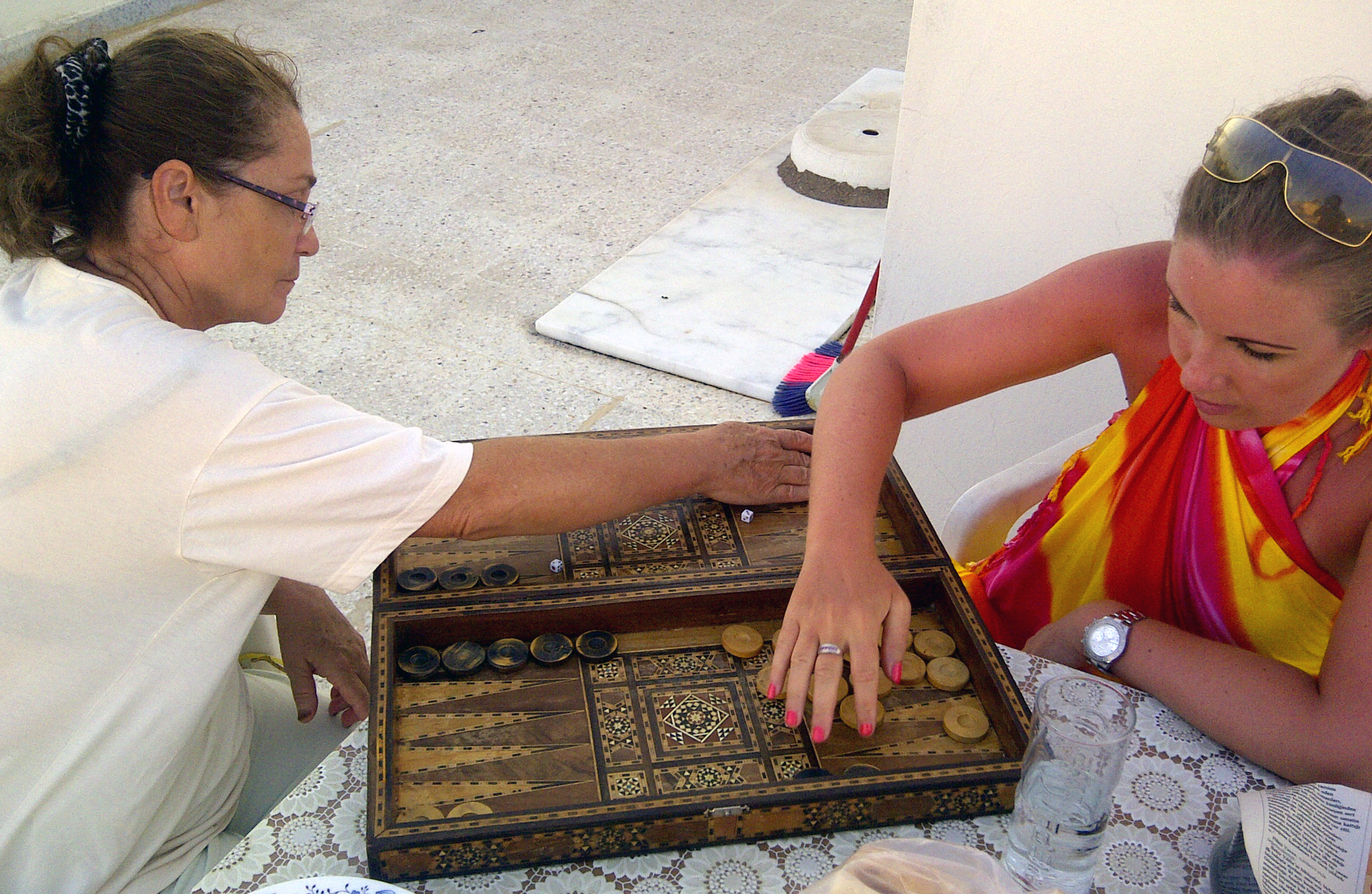
Women playing tavla in Turkey.

Tavla (from Latin Tabula, from Medieval Greek τάβλη or from Arabic "tawleh"), is a very popular game in Turkey. It lacks a doubling cube, gammons and backgammons are counted as two points called mars and the players may not hit and run in their home boards. Matches are usually played to five points. It is customary to call the dice rolls their Persian number names, with local spellings: yek (1), dü (2), se (3), cehar (4), penç (5), and şeş (6).

There are many variants of Tavla in Turkey, where the course of play changes drastically. The usual tavla is also known as erkek tavlası ("boys' tavla" or "men's tavla"). The other variant kız tavlası ("girls' tavla") is a game which depends only on the dice and involves no strategy. There is another variant called asker tavlası ("soldiers' tavla") where the pieces are thrown to the board randomly and the opponents try to flip their pieces over the opponents' pieces to beat them. The player with no pieces left loses the game. This variant doesn't involve dice at all and the play depends more on hand-eye coordination than tactical decision making. Üniversite tavlası ("university tavla") is a variant of the game played with two or more tavlas and four or more players, with the players forming groups. The dice are thrown only by two opposing players and the rest must play the same dice. If a team member gets beaten and cannot enter, his teammates cannot play for that round. Although the dice are the same, the game on every board differs, where the case of one team member winning and another losing is very common. This variant is considered much harder because the player must take more than one play into account while only being capable of making decisions on his own board.

Hapis (Turkish for "prison") is another tables game played in Turkey. It is very similar to Mahbusa played in the Arab World.

== Historical tables games ==
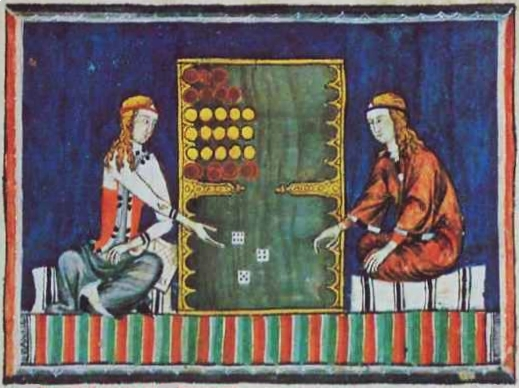
Seis, dos, y as from the 13th century Libro de los juegos

Many of the ancestors of modern tables games are no longer widely played.

=== 13th century Spanish games ===
- Games described in the royal book of games, Libro de los Juegos:
  - Quinze Tablas (Fifteen Pieces)
  - Doce Canes or Doce Hermanos (Twelve Dogs or Twelve Brothers)
  - Doblet (Doublet), related to the English game of Doublets
  - Fallas (Drop Dead), related to the English game of Fayles
  - Seys Does e As (Six, Two and Ace), related to the English game of Six-Ace
  - Emperador (Emperor)
  - Medio-Emperador (Half Emperor)
  - Paireia de Entrada (Paired Entry)
  - Cab e Quinal (Alongside Fives)
  - Todas Tablas (All Pieces), related to the Anglo-Scottish game of Irish
  - Laquet, related to the French game of Jacquet
  - Buffa Cortesa (Courtly Puff), related to the German game of Puff
  - Buffa de Baldrac (Common Puff)
  - Rencontrat

=== 16th and 17th century English games ===
- Games described by Willughby (1672):
  - Dublets
  - Ticktack
  - Irish, 16th and 17th century British game; directly ancestral to Backgammon.
  - Early Backgammon
- Additional games described by Cotton (1674):
  - Sice-Ace
  - Catch-Dolt (Ketch-Dolt)
- Additional games described by Seymour (1754):
  - Verquere
  - Grand Trick Track, related to French Trictrac
- Additional games described by Murray (1941):
  - Queens Game
  - Fails (or Fayles)
  - Lurch

== See also ==
- Mancala ('sowing' or seed games)

== Literature ==
- Bell, R.C. (1979) Board And Table Games From Many Civilizations (revised edition with two volumes dated 1960 and 1969 bound into a single book) – Dover Publications, Mineola, New York, 1979. ISBN 0-486-23855-5; reprinted by Exeter Books, New York City, 1983. ISBN 0-486-23855-5
- Fallavel J.M. (1715). Le Jeu du trictrac, Enrichi De Figures Avec les Jeux du Revertier, du Toute-Table, du Tourne-Case, de Dames Rabattues, du Plain et du Toc. 3rd edn. Paris: Henry Charpentier.
- Murray, H. J. R. (1952). A History of Board-Games other than Chess. 1st pub. 1952, Oxford University Press, reissued by Hacker Art Books (1978), ISBN 0-87817-211-4
- Finkel, Irving (2007). "On the Rules for the Royal Game of Ur" in Ancient Board Games in Perspective ed. Irving Finkel. London: British Museum. pp. 16–32.
- Fiske, Willard (1905). Chess in Iceland and Icelandic Literature: with historical notes on other table-games. Florence: Florentine Typographical Society.
- Parlett, David (1999). "The Tables Turned: Backgammon from Ur to Us" in The Oxford History of Board Games. Oxford: OUP, pp. 58–87. ISBN 9780192129987
