= Gul bara =

Mediterranean tables game

Gul Bara
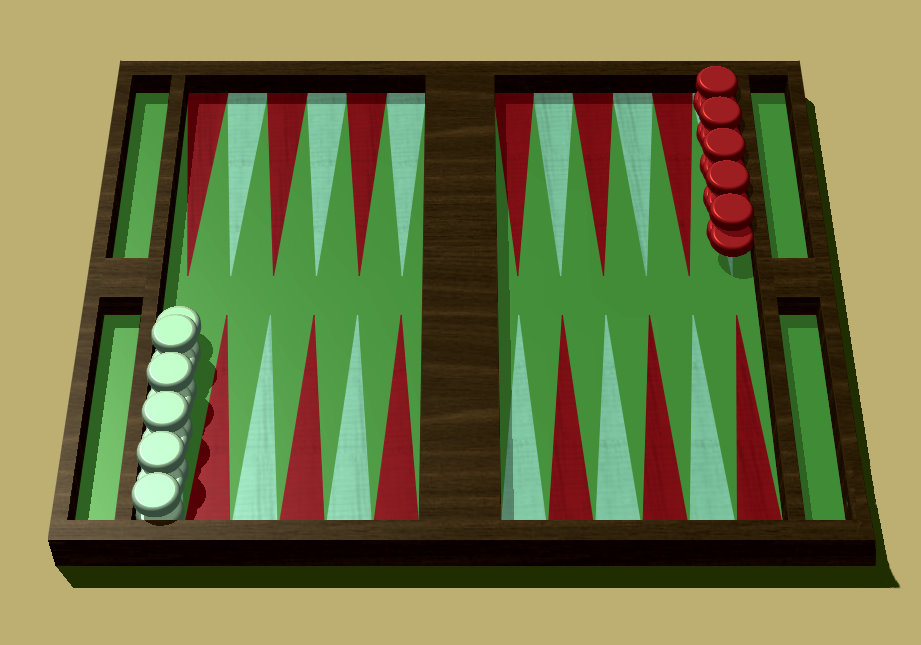
- Gul bara starting layout
- Genres: Board game Dice game
- Players: 2
- Movement: parallel, anticlockwise
- Chance: Medium (dice rolling)
- Skills: Strategy, tactics, counting, probability

Gul bara is a tables game, an ancient genre of board games that includes Backgammon, Trictrac and Nard. It is also called Rosespring Backgammon or Crazy Narde. The aim of the game is to move all of one's men around the board and bear them off. The first player who bears off all their men wins. The game is popular in Bulgaria, Azerbaijan, Greece, Turkey and North Macedonia.

== Play ==
Both players roll one die and the one with the higher number goes first. That player rolls both dice to begin the game. Each player starts with fifteen men on the rightmost point of the far side of the board, at diagonally opposite corners from each other. It is a game of parallel movement, i.e. both players move in the same direction around the board; in this in an anticlockwise direction.

== Rules ==
The roll of the dice indicates how many points the player may move the men. The following rules apply:

A man can only move to an open point, i.e. one that is not occupied by an opposing man. The numbers on the two dice may be used by the player either for individual moves or may be added together and used for a single move. For example, if a player rolls 6 and 4, one man may be moved six points to an open point and another four points further to an open point; alternatively one man may be moved a total of ten to an open point, but only if the intermediate point (the fourth or sixth point from the starting point) is also open.

Unlike many other forms tables games, there is no hitting in Gul bara (that is, it is a running game like jacquet rather than a pinning game like plakoto, a hitting game like backgammon, or a scoring game like trictrac). One man on a point controls it, and an opposing man cannot be placed on that particular point.

== Doublets ==
An unusual feature of Gul bara is that doublets are very powerful. When a doublet is rolled, the roll is played in the normal way and then every succeeding doublet is played up to and including 6-6.

During the first three rolls of the game, doublets only played twice. For example, a roll of 3-3 means one that four threes are available to be used. This changes after the first three rolls. Now the player not only plays the number rolled four times, but also plays each successive number four times. For example, if a player rolls 2-2, he or she may play four 2's, then four 3's, four 4's, four 5's and finally four 6's. If at any point the player is unable to play all four numbers, the rest are lost and the opponent plays the remainder before starting their next turn. It is not difficult to play consecutive doubles when the game is still in its early stages. But because, in Gul bara, it only needs one man to block a point, players block more and more points and as the game progresses playing all the doubles is often quite difficult.

== Bearing off and winning ==
Bearing off can start once a player has moved all of fifteen men into the home board. A player may bear off a man by rolling a number that corresponds to the point on which it resides and then removing that man from the board. If there is no man on the point indicated by the roll, the player must make a legal move using a man positioned on a higher-numbered point. If there are no men on higher-numbered points, the player must remove a man from the highest point that is occupied. The first player who bears off all fifteen men scores one point and is declared the winner. A player scores two points if all men are borne off before the opponent has borne any off.
