= Plakoto =

Greek tables game

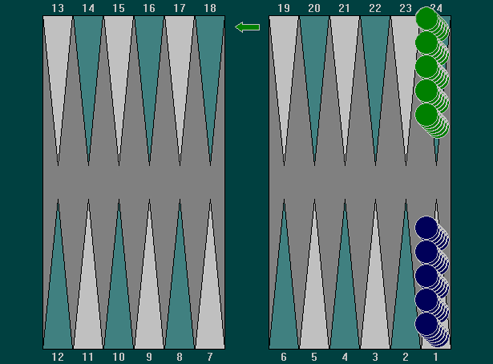
- The starting layout
- Other names: Arabic: Mahbusa; Bulgarian: Tapa
- Genres: Board game Race game tables game Dice game
- Players: 2
- Movement: contrary
- Chance: Medium (dice rolling)
- Skills: Strategy, tactics, counting, probability
- Related games: "The English Game", Tapa, Emperador

Plakoto (Πλακωτό) is a tables game for two players that is popular in Greece. The object is for the player to bring all 15 pieces around to his or her own home board and then bear them off. The player who bears off all 15 pieces first wins the game. This game is usually played along with two other variants, Févga and Pórtes (the latter is similar to backgammon). Together these three games are called Távli, and are played in sequence usually one after the other. Game is three, five or seven points. A Middle Eastern version of this game is Mahbusa, and the Bulgarian version of Plakoto is known as Tapa and also as Tsillitón (Τσιλλιτόν), in Cyprus. Parlett places Plakoto in the same group as the popular medieval game of English, as well as the French games of Tieste and Impérial, the Italian game of Testa and Spanish Emperador.

== Goal ==
It is a game of contrary movement i.e. the pieces or men move around in opposing directions. The goal is to bring all pieces to the home board (points 1 to 6) and then bear them off. The one who bears off all 15 pieces first wins the game.

== Play ==
Each player has fifteen pieces. One player's pieces are placed on the ace-point; the opponent's pieces are placed on the 24 point. At the start of the game each player rolls one die and the player with the higher roll has the privilege of going first. That player must roll the dice again to begin the first turn. The player who wins a game starts the next game. The number of points, or pips, or the places a player can move his pieces is decided by the roll of the dice.

== Rules ==
In Plakoto a piece can only be moved to an open point. An open point is the one that is not occupied by two or more opposing pieces. The numbers cast after rolling the two dice represent separate moves. For example, if a player rolls 4 and 2, she may move a piece four spaces to an open point and a second piece two spaces to an open point. A player may also combine the casts and move a single piece a total of six spaces to an open point — the precondition for this single move is that the intermediate point (four or two spaces from the starting point) must also be open.

== Doublets ==
Doublets in Plakoto are played twice. For example, a roll of 3-3 means that the player can use the three's four times. Whenever possible the player must use both numbers of a roll and all four numbers in the case he throws a doublet in rolling the dice.

== Pinning ==
Hitting is not allowed in Plakoto. Instead, if a player lands on a point occupied by a single opponent's piece, he places the piece on top of the opponent's and pins it. A pinned piece may not be moved. Pinning a piece already used for pinning is not allowed. Two of your pieces on a point, or one of your pieces used for pinning an opponent's piece, create an anchor, a blocked point on which the opponent cannot land or touch down.

== Mother piece ==
The mother piece is the last piece on a player's starting point. It is very important in Plakoto, because if the mother piece gets pinned by an opposing piece before it has left the starting point, the game is over and lost double. This rule is waived if the opponent also has his own mother piece at the starting point. A game in which the mother pieces of both players are pinned results in a tie.

== Bearing off ==
A player may only start bearing off in Plakoto after all fifteen pieces have reached the home board. A player can bear off by rolling a number that corresponds to the point on which the piece is placed. If there is no piece on the point indicated by the roll, then the player has to make a legal move using a piece on a higher-numbered point. If there are no pieces on higher-numbered points, the player must remove a piece from the highest point that has a piece. In this way he can remove all of his pieces from the board.

== Scoring ==
The first player who bears off all his fifteen pieces is the winner. If the loser has successfully borne off at least one piece, he loses only one point; otherwise two points are lost.

== Tapa ==
Tapa (Тапа) is a very similar tables game played in Bulgaria and North Macedonia. The word tapa means bottle cap.

Tapa is usually played as the third game in a Tabla match, the first two being Prava Tabla (backgammon; the game translates to "true Tables" and is also played on its own) and Gjul Bara. These 3 games are played consecutively in a match of 5. All 3 games are played on a standard tables board. (Note that there might be slight differences in the match rules and scoring; the ones described here are common for North Macedonia).

Tapa is also played in Middle East where it is known as Mahbusa ( Arabic: محبوسة ), pronounced Mahbouseh in Levantine Arabic.

The rules are as for Plakoto above with the following variations:

- Starting layout. The starting layout is effectively the same; however, it is usual, but not necessary, to place only 2 pieces at the start and add the others as the game develops. Since Tapa is not played as a single game, the winner of the previous game (Gjul Bara) in the match has the first turn.
- No mother piece. There is no 'mother piece'.
- Double game. A double game is called a mars.

== Backgammon comparison ==
Plakoto and Tapa differs significantly from Backgammon in several ways:

- they are pinning games. There is no hitting or hit and run.
- There is no triple game or backgammon equivalent
- There is no doubling cube, so a player cannot win more than 2 match points in a single game.
- The player to go first re-rolls the dice; thus starting with a doublet is possible.

== Literature ==
- Frantzis, Nicholas (1979). The Seven Popular Games of Backgammon. Hicksville, NY: Exposition. p. 42.
- Goldberg, Suzanne and Robert Hamilton (1996). Backgammon. San Francisco: Gamescape. p. 1.
- Jacoby, Oswald and John R. Crawford (1970). The Backgammon Book. NY: Viking. p. 212.
- Obolensky, Prince Alexis and Ted James (1969). Backgammon: The Action Game. London: Allen. p. 165.
- Parlett, David (1999). The Oxford History of Board Games. Oxford: OUP.
- Ratip, Arman (1977). How to Play Backgammon. London: Spring. p. 38. (under "Press Backgammon")
- Tzannes, Nicolaos and Basil Tzannes (1977). Backgammon Games and Strategies. South Brunswick: Barnes. p. 82.
