= Ludus Anglicorum =

14th-century English tables game

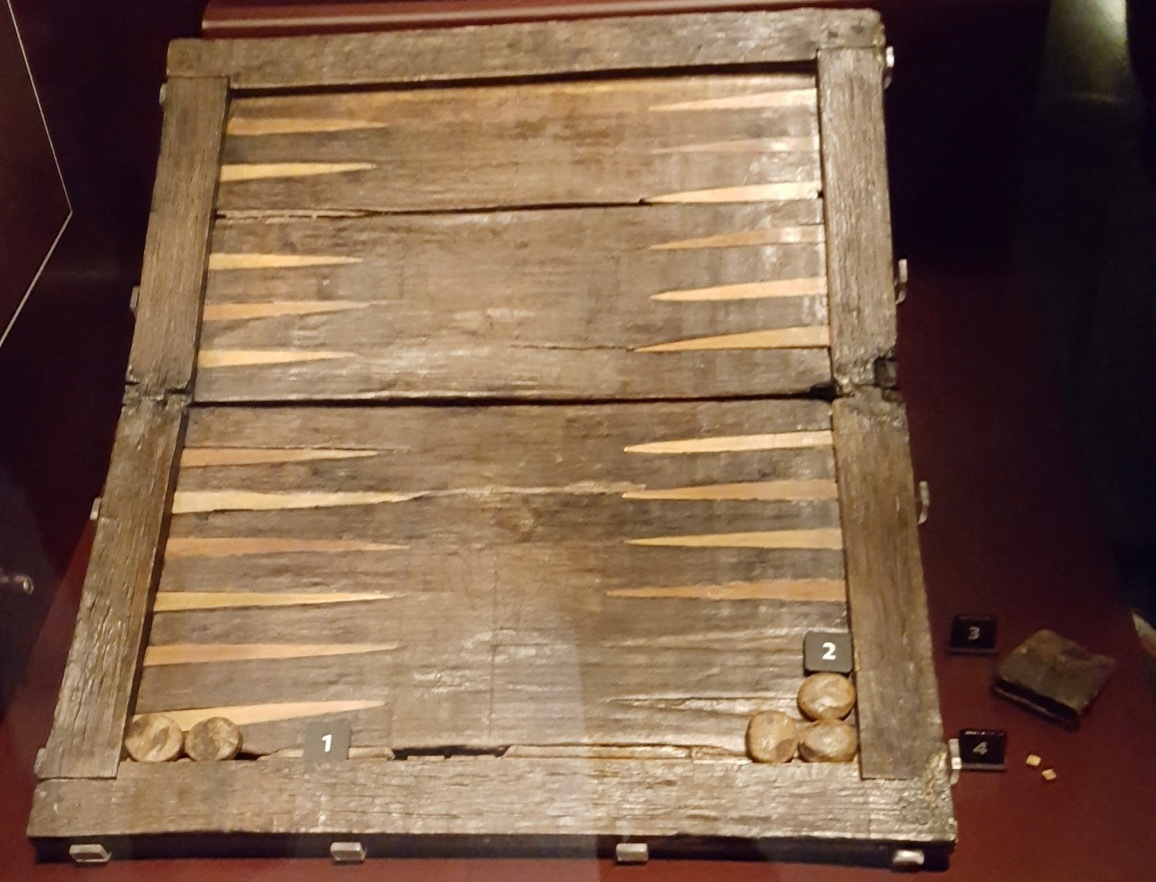
- Tables board from the 1545 shipwreck Mary Rose, with dice and possible dice-shaker (right)
- Other names: The English Game, English, the Long Game
- Genres: Board game Race game Dice game
- Players: 2
- Movement: contrary
- Chance: Medium (dice rolling)
- Skills: Strategy, tactics, counting, probability

Related games
- Backgammon, Emperador, Irish

Ludus Anglicorum, also called the English Game, is an historical English tables game for two players using a board similar to that used today for Backgammon and other games. It is a "strategic game for serious game-players" and was well known in the Middle Ages. At one time it was considered the most popular tables game in England.

== History ==
The English Game or Long Game is described in detail in a 14th century manuscript written in Latin and Anglo-Norman French, which is held in the British Museum. It was said to be the most popular tables game in the mediaeval England of Chaucer's time.

The English Game bears close similarity to the game of Emperador listed by King Alfonso X of Castile in his Libro de los Juegos ("Book of Games") published in 1278.

It may have been the game frequently referred to simply as 'Tables'. It appears to have evolved into Ticktack and Irish which had both superseded it by the 17th century.

== Players and equipment ==
The English Game was a game for two players using three dice and 15 men apiece, and played on a tables board (see illustration) with 12 playing positions or points on each side. The four quadrants of the board are known as 'tables', a player's home table being the first six points on his side including the starting or home point; and a player's bearing table being the final and opposite quadrant, where the opponent starts.

The game could also be played with two dice, in which case a third throw of 6 was assumed each time.

== Rules ==
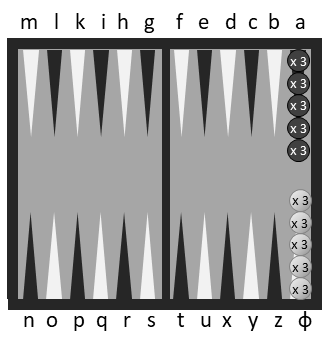
The starting layout. White sits at the top.

The notation used in the original manuscript is illustrated. In this case, Black sits at the bottom by the side marked nф and assembles all 15 men on his or her home point, point "a". White sits at the top by the side marked am and assembles all 15 white men opposite on point "ф". Black moves anticlockwise; White clockwise.

Black's aim is to move the 15 men on point "a" along the remaining 11 points of the opposing side of the board and then in the reverse direction on the home side towards the bearing table, tф. White moves from point "ф" clockwise around to White's bearing table, af.

To move their men, players roll the dice and assign each die to one man, moving it the corresponding number of points forward. Two dice may be combined e.g. a 4 and 3 may be used to move a man 7 points. Men may move to any point except one occupied by two or more opposing men.

If a point is occupied by just one enemy piece and a man is moved to that point, or 'rests' on that point as part of a two- or three-dice move, the opponent's man must be removed and re-entered. When a man is removed, its owner may not play any men on the board until the removed piece has been re-entered; this must be done into the player's home table e.g. if Black rolls a 4, the man may enter point "d" if it is not blocked by the opponent or already occupied by a black piece. (Note: The normal rule that men may be accumulated on one point does not apply in this instance.)

When all 15 men have safely reached the bearing table, they are borne off. The first player to do so, wins. To successfully bear a man off, the player must roll the exact number needed to take it off the board e.g. Black needs a 6 if the man is on "t", a 5 if on "u" and so on. If the die roll is higher than the number required by the furthest man, then that man may be borne off.

=== Lympolding and lurching ===
Another way of winning is to create a blockade such that the opponent cannot move. For example, if Black occupies n to r with two men each and creates a situation where White has 8 men queued up on "a" waiting to be borne off while having a man on each point of the home board plus one waiting to be re-entered, he is stuck. This is called lympolding.

Another way of winning is called lurching which is achieved, for example, if Black secures the opponent's entire home board and the "s" point.

Shelagh Lewins interprets lympolding and lurching slightly differently. Lympolding occurs when a player cannot re-enter a man because all points in the home table are blocked by the opponent or occupied by friendly men. Lurching is when a player is unable to move due to any combination of a blockade and a pile up of men on the final point. In either case, Lewins only requires the player to miss a turn.

== Related games ==
Murray (1941) relates Ludus Anglicorum to the Spanish tables game of Emperador, which is described in El Libro de los Juegos ("The Book of Games") by King Alfonso X of Castile in 1278. Emperador opens with the same starting position and also has special terms for winning in different ways. For example, a six-point blockade was a barata or prime.

Parlett places Ludus Anglicorum in the same group as the French games of Tieste and Impérial, the Greek game of Plakoto and the Italian game of Testa, as well as Spanish Emperador.

== Literature ==
- _ (1333) Royal 13 A XVIII, part 2, folio 158r, British Museum, Latin transcript and English translation by Will McLean (2015).
- Fiske, Willard (1905). Chess in Iceland and in Icelandic Literature: with Historical Notes on Other Table-Games. Florence: The Florentine Typographical Society.
- Forgeng, Jeffrey L. and Will McLean (2009). Daily Life in Chaucer's England, 2nd edn. Westport, CT and London: Greenwood.
- Murray, Harold James Ruthven (1941). "The Mediaeval Games of Tables" in Medium AEvum. Vol. 10, Part 2. pp. 57–69.
- Murray, Harold James Ruthven (1952). A History of Board-Games Other Than Chess. Oxford: Clarendon.
- Parlett, David (1999). The Oxford History of Board Games. Oxford: OUP.
- Willughby, Francis (2003). Forgeng, Jeff; Johnston, Dorothy; Cram, David (eds.). Francis Willughby's Book of Games. Farnham: Ashgate. ISBN 1-85928-460-4. (Critical edition of Willughby's volume containing descriptions of games and pastimes, c.1660-1672. Manuscript in the Middleton collection, University of Nottingham; document reference Mi LM 14)
- Lewins, Shelagh (2021). Tabula at Rumwoldstow: Early mediaeval backgammon in an Anglo-Saxon monastery (pdf).
