= Ludus duodecim scriptorum =

Ancient Roman board game

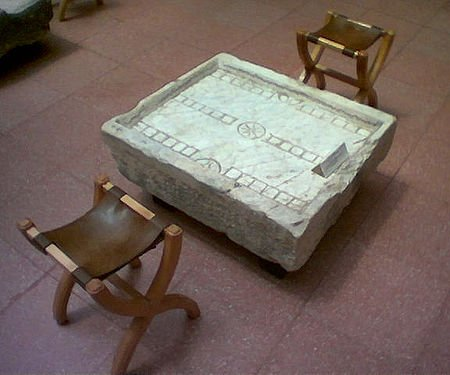
XII scripta board in the museum at Ephesus

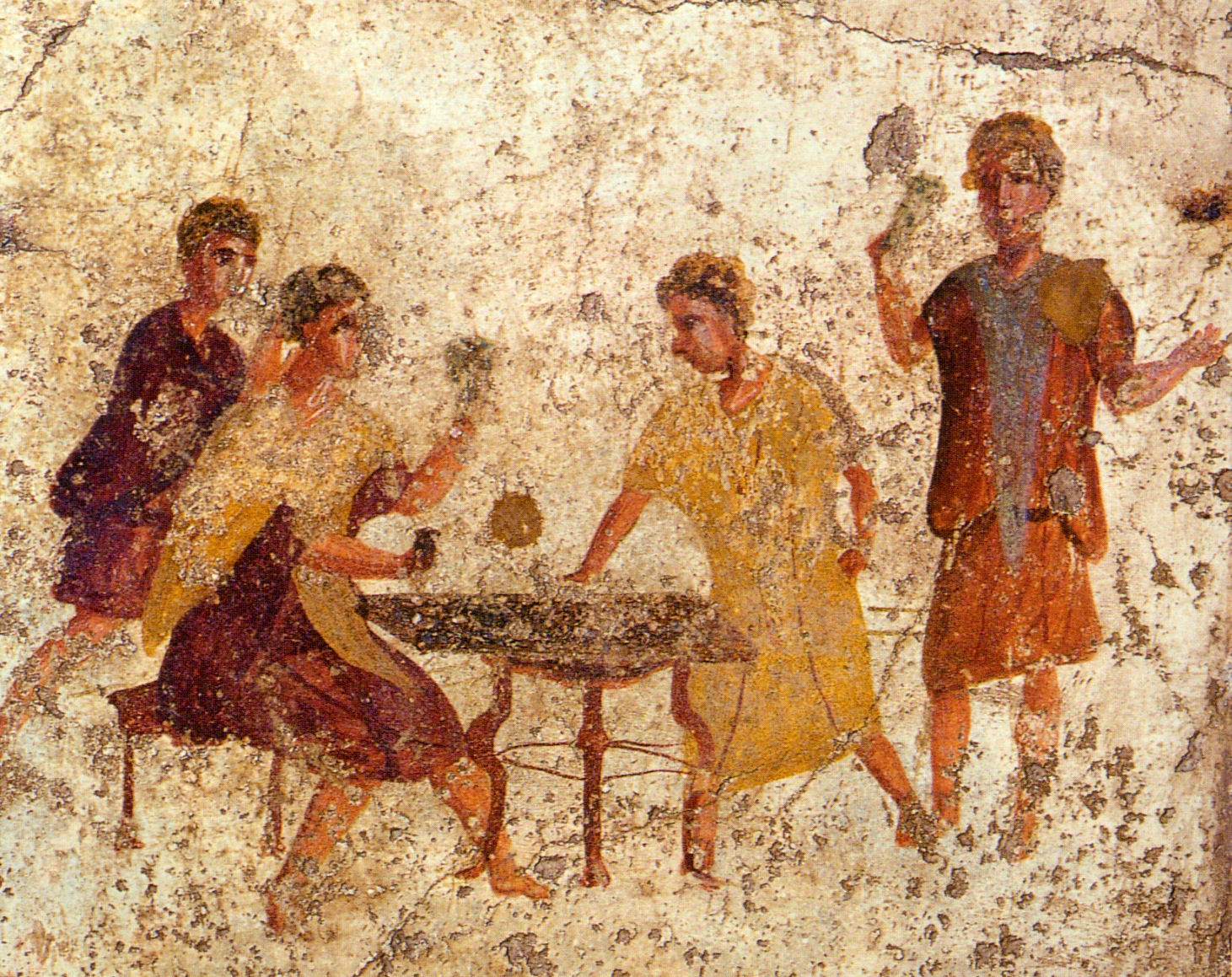
Fresco showing dice players, Pompeii

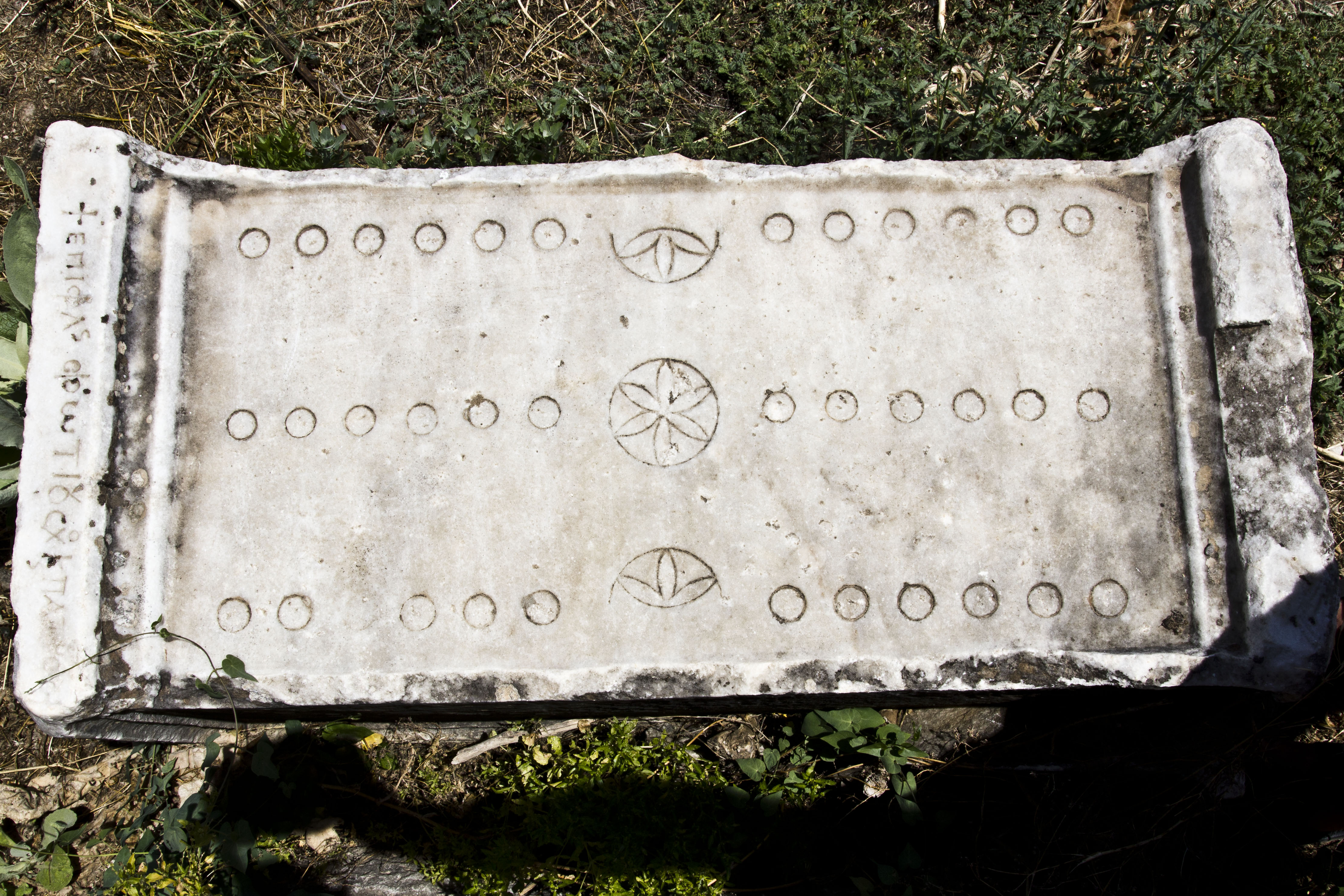
Roman board from the 2nd century, Aphrodisias

Ludus duodecim scriptorum, or XII scripta, was a board game popular during the time of the Roman Empire. The name translates as "game of twelve markings", probably referring to the three rows of 12 markings (36 total) each found on most surviving boards. The game tabula is thought to be a descendant of this game, and both are tables games as is modern backgammon.

XII scripta was likely played by people from many walks of Roman life. Boards have been found carved into stone surfaces in public spaces such as forums and bathhouses, suggesting it was a common pastime for ordinary citizens as well as soldiers and nobles. Its simple materials — a board, dice, and pieces — made it easy to set up almost anywhere.

It has been speculated that XII scripta is related to the Egyptian game senet. A factor casting doubt on this link is that the latest known classical senet board is over half of a millennium older than the earliest known XII scripta board.

Very little information about specific gameplay has survived. The game was played using three cubic dice, and each player had 15 pieces. A possible "beginners' board", having spaces marked with letters, has suggested a possible path for the movement of pieces.

The earliest known mention of the game is in Ovid's Ars Amatoria (The Art of Love; written between 1 BC and 8 AD). An ancient example of the game was excavated at the archaeological site of Kibyra in southern Turkey.
