= Tavli =

Greek tables game

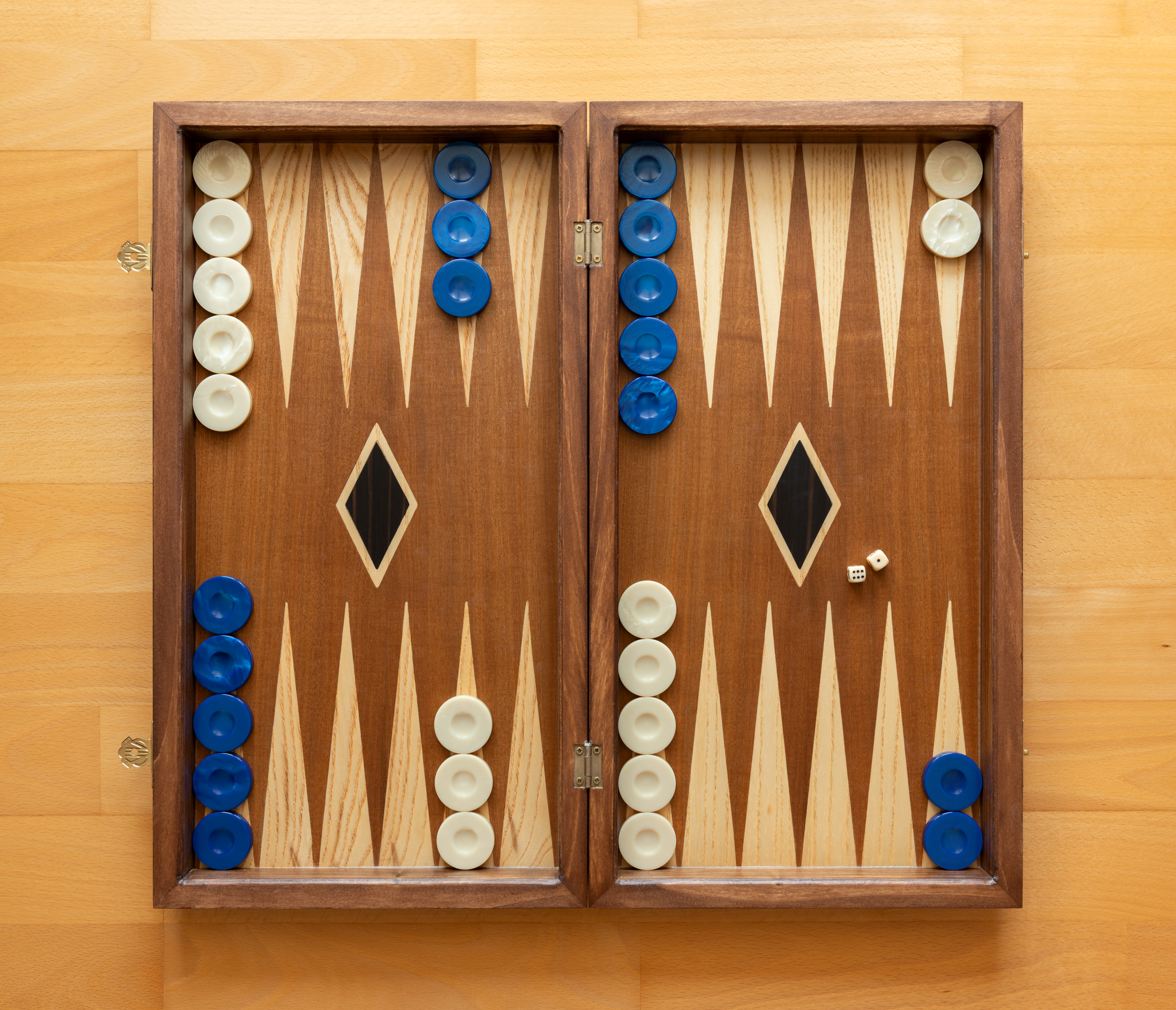
- Genres: Board game, race game, tables game, dice game
- Players: 2
- Movement: Portes and Plakoto: contrary; Fevga: parallel
- Chance: Medium (dice rolling)
- Skills: Strategy, tactics, counting, probability
- Compendium game of the tables family

Tavli (Greek: Τάβλι, Turkish: Tavla, Tabla, Latin: Tabula), sometimes called Greek backgammon or Iraqi backgammon in English, is the most popular way of playing tables games in Balkans, Eastern Europe and West Asia particularly in Bulgaria, North Macedonia, Bosnia and Herzegovina, Croatia, Serbia, Greece, Turkey, Syria, Iraq, Iran, Azerbaijan, Lebanon and Cyprus and considered as national board game in many places with its variants. Tavli is a compendium game for two players which comprises three different variants played in succession: Portes, Plakoto and Fevga. These are played in a cycle until one player reaches the target score - usually five or seven points.

== Description ==
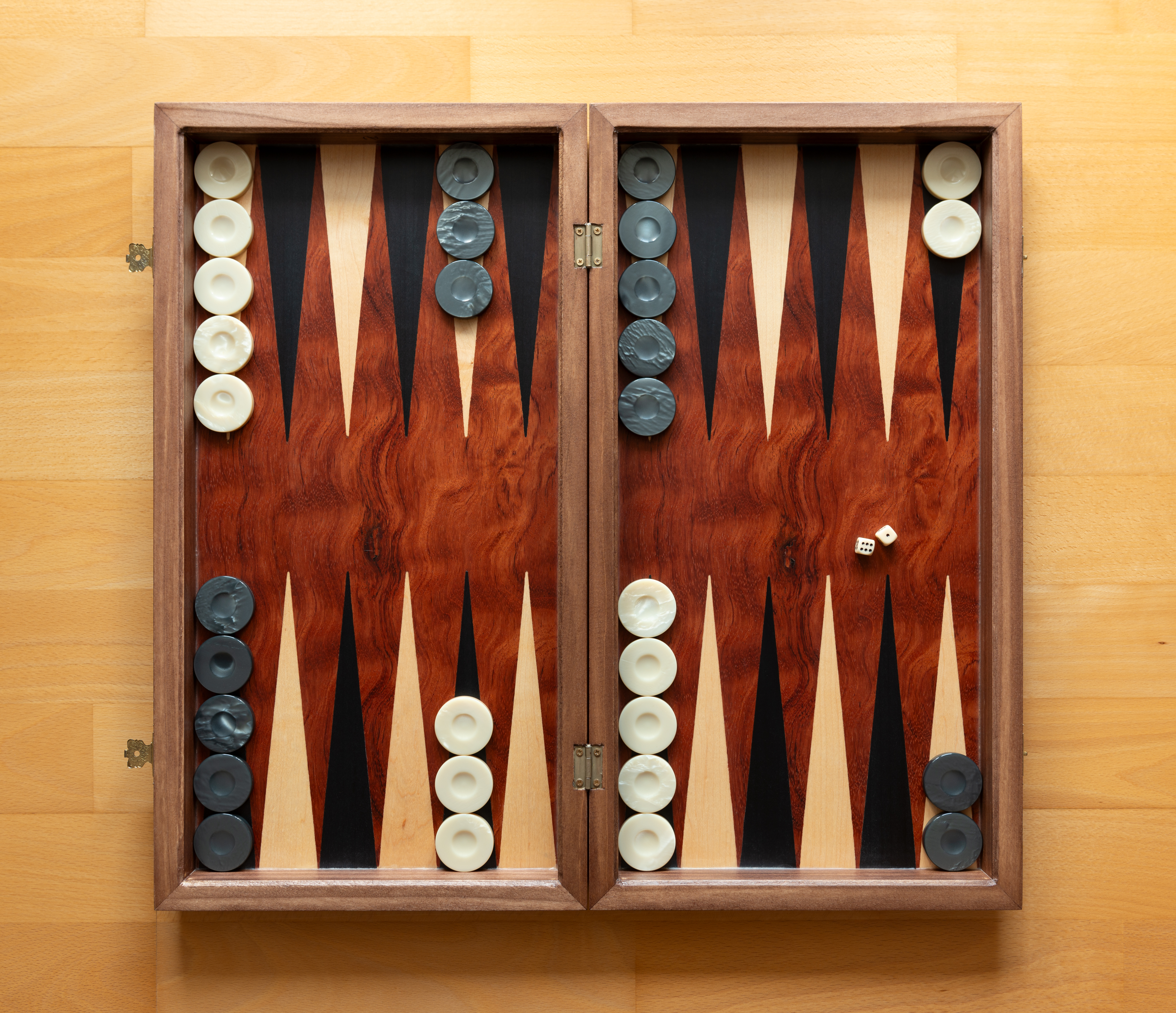
Traditional Greek Tavli board made from Rosewood with checkers made of Galalith.

Tables games are an ancient family of race games, the best known modern example of which is backgammon. However, in Greece the most popular form of tables is Tavli, a word which is the equivalent of "tables games". Hence, this is not a single game, but a trio of tables games played to different rules and tactics. These are Portes, Plakoto and Fevga and they are played in that order until a player reaches the agreed target score. The aim in each game is to be the first player to bear off all 15 men or pieces.

=== Portes ===
Portes is the game that resembles backgammon most closely. It is a hitting game in which the players may hit enemy blots off the board. The starting layout and rules are as for backgammon except that:

- The player who leads re-rolls both dice to start the game. Thus a doublet is possible on the first move.
- There is no hit-and-run in home board.
- The game may either be won singly, or won double if the loser has yet to bear off a man. There is no equivalent of a backgammon and therefore no triple win.
- There is no doubling cube.

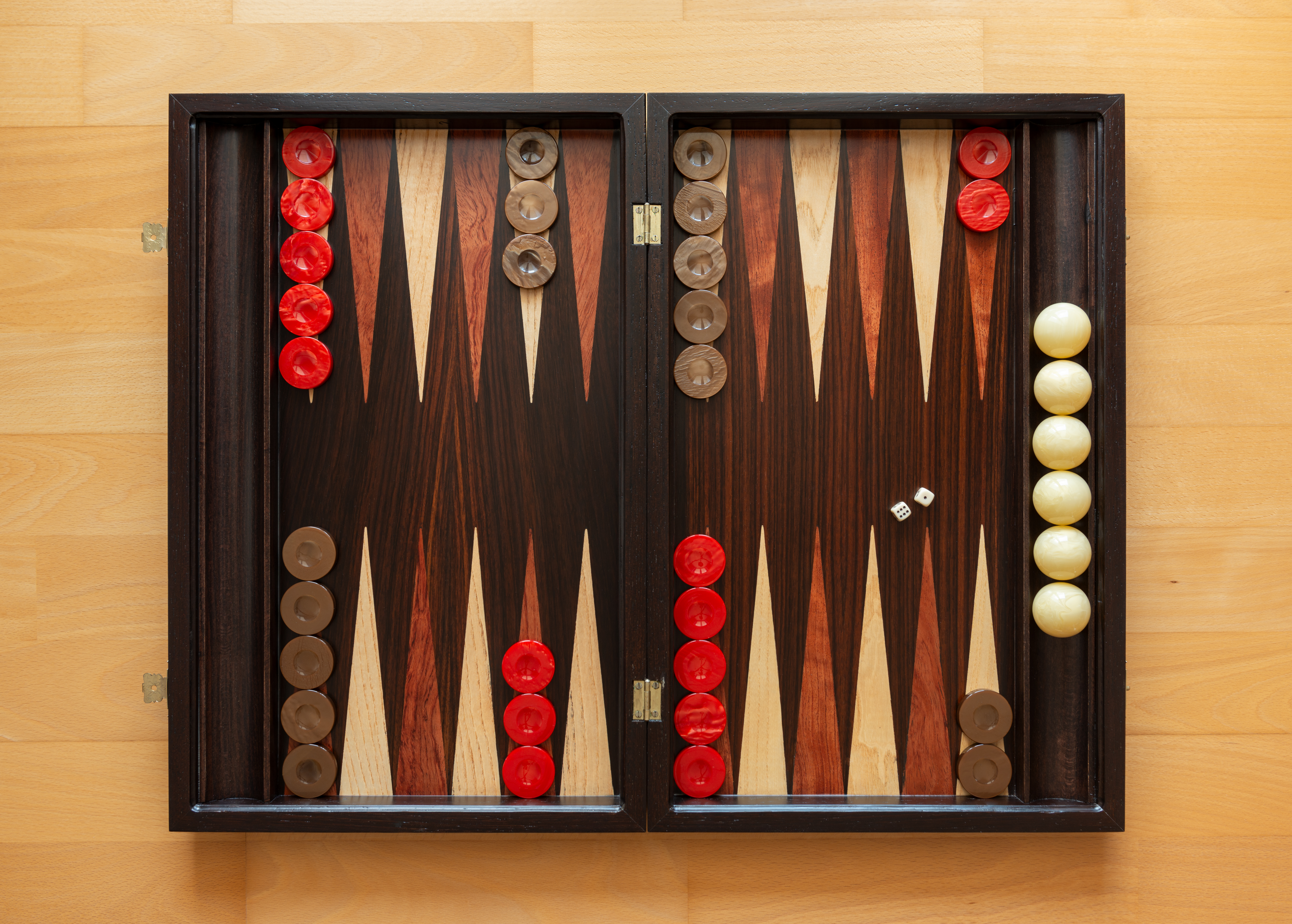
Tavli board with slots on the sides to store the checkers after playing. This type of board is considered newer or not traditional by Tavli purists.

=== Plakoto ===
Plakoto is the second game in the sequence. It is a pinning game in which hitting is not permitted. Key features include:

- Players may pin a single opposing man in place by covering it with one of their own men, preventing the pinned piece from moving until the covering man is released.
- Two or more pieces of the same side or a piece pinning an opposing man creates a block for the opponent.
- Players start with all 15 men on point 24.
- The last piece left on the starting point is the mother. If she is pinned before moving off, the game is over and the pinning player wins double.
- There is no doubling cube.

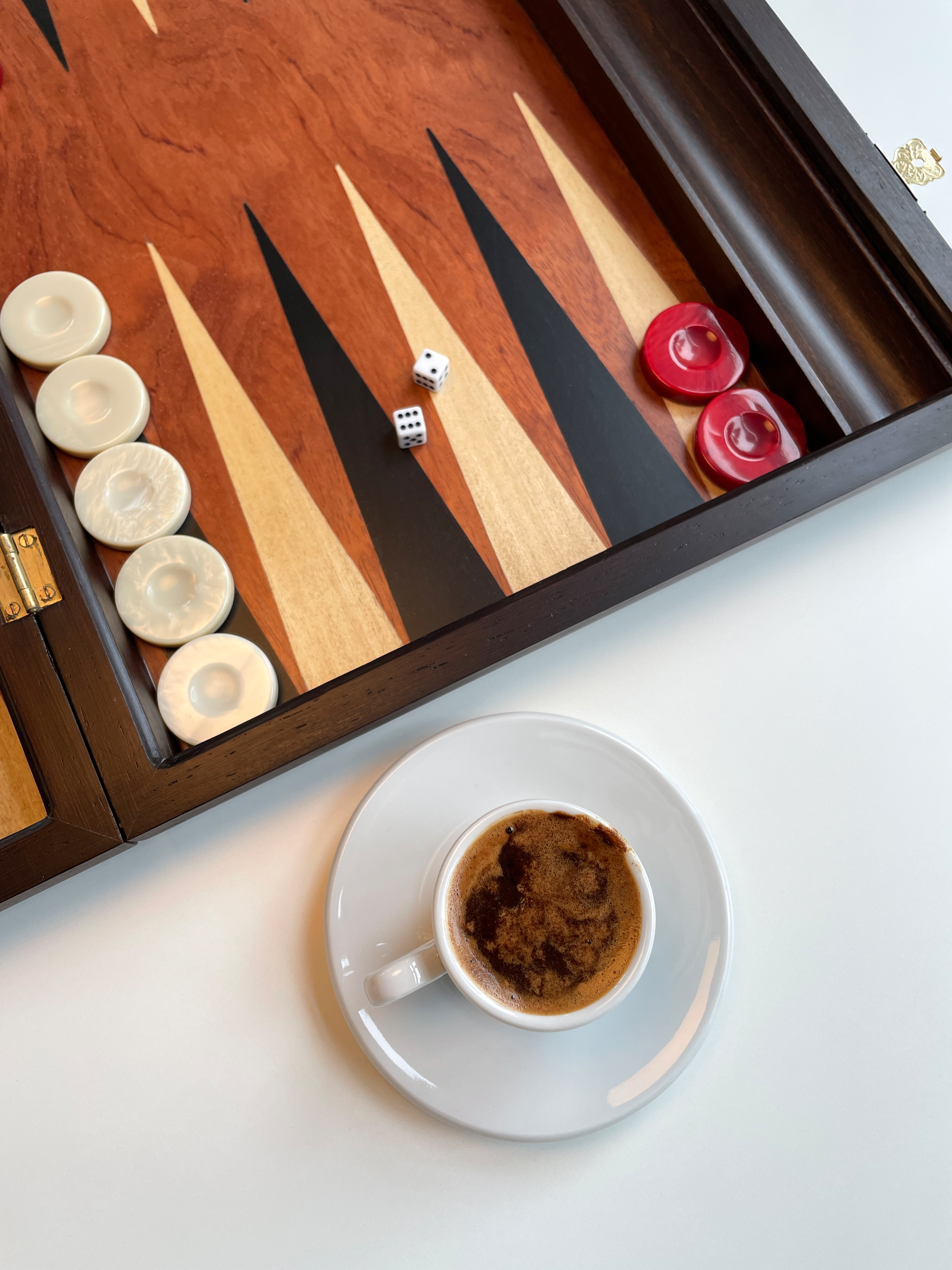
Tavli is as much a social activity as it is a game.

=== Fevga ===
Fevga is the third game in the series. It is a running game in which neither hitting nor pinning are permitted. Thus single man 'makes the point'. It is a game of parallel movement, both players moving in an anticlockwise direction.

Other key features:

- Players start with all 15 men on point 24.
- No blocking. A player may not completely block the opponent i.e. in making a move, there must remain at least one possible move for the opponent.
- No triple game
- No doubling cube

== Literature ==
- Bonner, Simon J. (2015). Encyclopedia of American Folklife. London, NY: Routledge.
- Hinebaugh, Jeffrey P. (2019). More Board Game Education. London, NY: Rowman & Littlefield.
- Papahristou, Nikolaos and Ioannis Refanidis (2013). Opening Statistics and Match Play for Backgammon Games. Thessaloniki: University of Macedonia.
- Papahristou, Nikolaos (2015). Decision Making in Multiplayer Environments: Application in backgammon variants. Thessaloniki: University of Macedonia. Doctoral Studies Programme.
