= Tactic (method) =

Conceptual action implemented as one or more specific tasks

A tactic is a conceptual action or short series of actions with the aim of achieving a short-term goal. This action can be implemented as one or more specific tasks. The term is commonly used in business, by protest groups, in military, espionage, and law enforcement contexts, as well as in chess, sports or other competitive activities.

== Etymology ==
The word originates from the Ancient Greek adjective τακτικός (taktikos), meaning that which pertains to ordinance. The related Ancient Greek noun is τάγμα (tagma), meaning ordinance, command. Both words root in the verb τάσσω (tasso), meaning draw up in order, station, appoint

== Distinction from strategy ==
A strategy is a set of guidelines used to achieve an overall objective, whereas tactics are the specific actions aimed at adhering to those guidelines.

=== Military usage ===
In military usage, a military tactic is used by a military unit of no larger than a division to implement a specific mission and achieve a specific objective, or to advance toward a specific target.

The terms tactic and strategy are often confused: tactics are the actual means used to gain an objective, while strategy is the overall campaign plan, which may involve complex operational patterns, activity, and decision-making that govern tactical execution. The United States Department of Defense Dictionary of Military Terms defines the tactical level as "the level of war at which battles and engagements are planned and executed to accomplish military objectives assigned to tactical units or task forces. Activities at this level focus on the ordered arrangement and maneuver of combat elements in relation to each other and to the enemy to achieve combat objectives."

If, for example, the overall goal is to win a war against another country, one strategy might be to undermine the other nation's ability to wage war by preemptively annihilating their military forces. The tactics involved might describe specific actions taken in specific locations, like surprise attacks on military facilities, missile attacks on offensive weapon stockpiles, and the specific techniques involved in accomplishing such objectives.

== See also ==
- Chess tactics
- Political tactics
- Protest tactics
- Strategy
- Tactical bombing
- Tactical wargame
