= The Compleat Gamester =

English game rulebook

The Compleat Gamester, first published in 1674, is one of the earliest known English-language games compendia. It was published anonymously, but later attributed to Charles Cotton (1630–1687). Further editions appeared in the period up to 1754 before it was eclipsed by Mr. Hoyle's Games by Edmond Hoyle (1672–1769).

== History ==
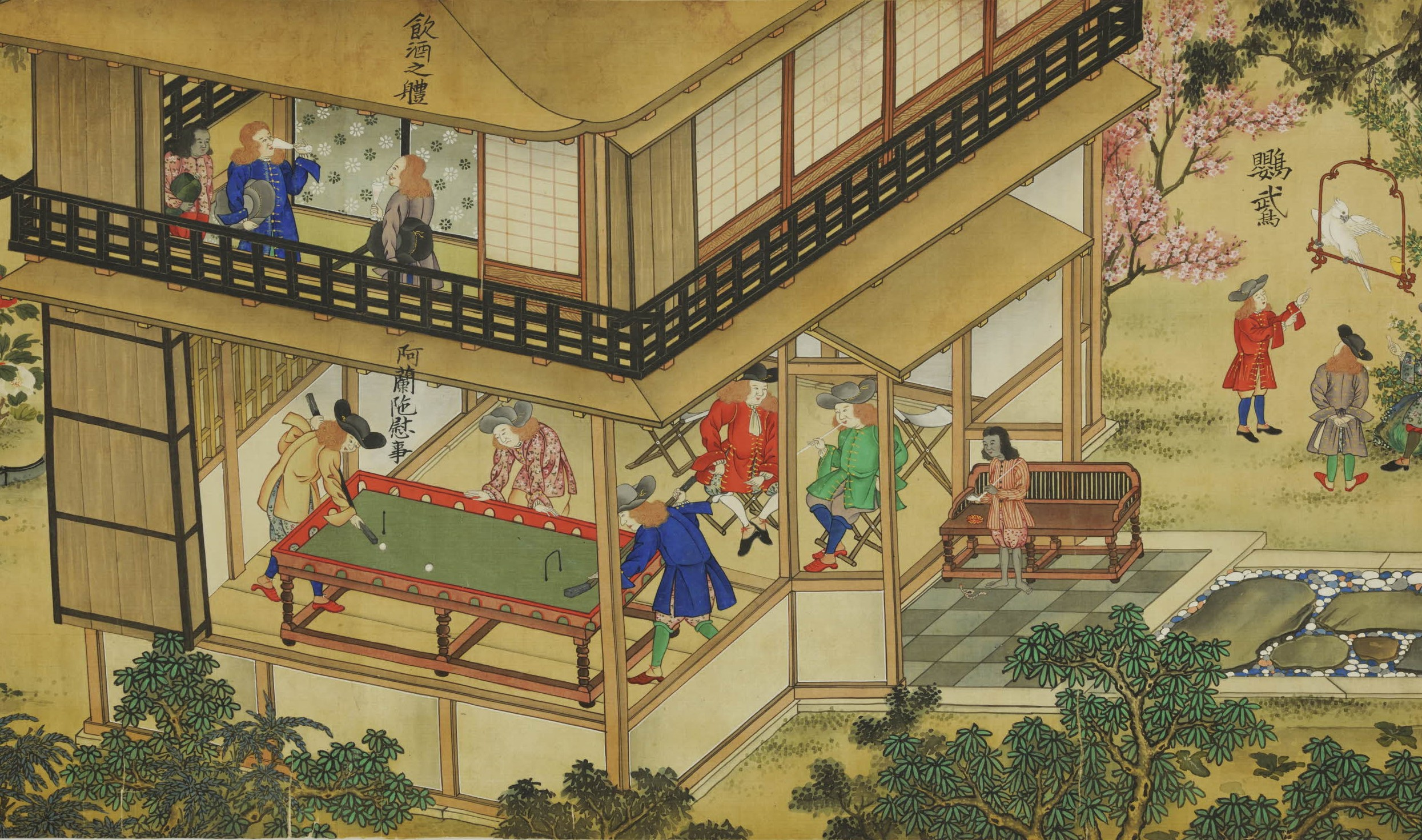
The game of trucks

In the mid-17th century, game literature in England took off. Initially these were translations of French books, for example on piquet, but later more original publications appeared. The most successful of these was The Compleat Gamester, which was first published anonymously in 1674, but was attributed during the 18th century to Charles Cotton. (Note: The full citation is "Cotgrave's rules for card games were themselves cribbed by the most successful of the seventeenth-century English treatises on games, The Compleat Gamester, which first appeared anonymously in 1674; in the eighteenth century it was attributed to Charles Cotton.")

== Contents ==
The 1674 edition included instructions on how to play "all manner of usual and most gentile games either on cards or dice," as well as "the arts and mysteries" of riding, racing, archery and cock-fighting.

- Billiards
- Trucks
- Bowls
- Chess
- Picket
- Gleek
- L'Ombre
- Basset
- Cribbage
- All fours
- Ruff and honours
- Whist
- French Ruff
- Five-cards
- Costly Colours
- Bone ace
- Putt
- Wit and reason
- The art of memory
- Plain dealing
- Queen Nazarene
- Lanterloo
- Penneech
- Post and pair
- Bankafalet
- Beast
- Irish
- Backgammon
- Ticktack
- Dubblets
- Sice-ace
- Catch-dolt (Ketch-dolt)
- Inn and inn
- Passage
- Hazard

== Editions ==
Charles Cotton died in 1687, so subsequent editions were edited by other writers.

- 1674: The Compleat Gamester. A.M, London. Charles Cotton.
- 1676: The Compleat Gamester, 2nd edn. Charles Cotton.
- 1709: The Compleat Gamester. Brome, London. Unknown editor.
- 1721: The Complete Gamester. J. Wilford, London. Seymour
- 1725: The Compleat Gamester, 5th edn with additions. J. Wilford, London. Unknown ed.
- 1726: The Compleat Gamester, 6th edn with additions. Wilford, London. Unknown ed.
- 1734: The Compleat Gamester, 5th edn. E. Curll / J. Wilford. London. Edited by Richard Seymour.
- 1739: The Compleat Gamester, 6th edn. Curll/Hodges, London. Edited by Richard Seymour.
- 1750: The Compleat Gamester, 7th edn. J. Hodges, London. Edited by Richard Seymour.
- 1754: The Compleat Gamester, 8th edn. J. Hodges, London. Edited by Charles Johnson.

== Literature ==
- Cotton, Charles (1674). The Compleat Gamester; Or, Instructions how to Play at Billiards, Trucks, Bowls and Chess ... Cards ... Dice, To which is Added the Arts ... of Riding, Racing, Archery, and Cockfighting [by Charles Cotton]. Henry Brome.
- Cram, David; Forgeng, Jeffrey L. (2003). Francis Willughby's Book of Games. Oxford: Routledge.
