= John Taylor (poet) =

English poet (1578–1653)

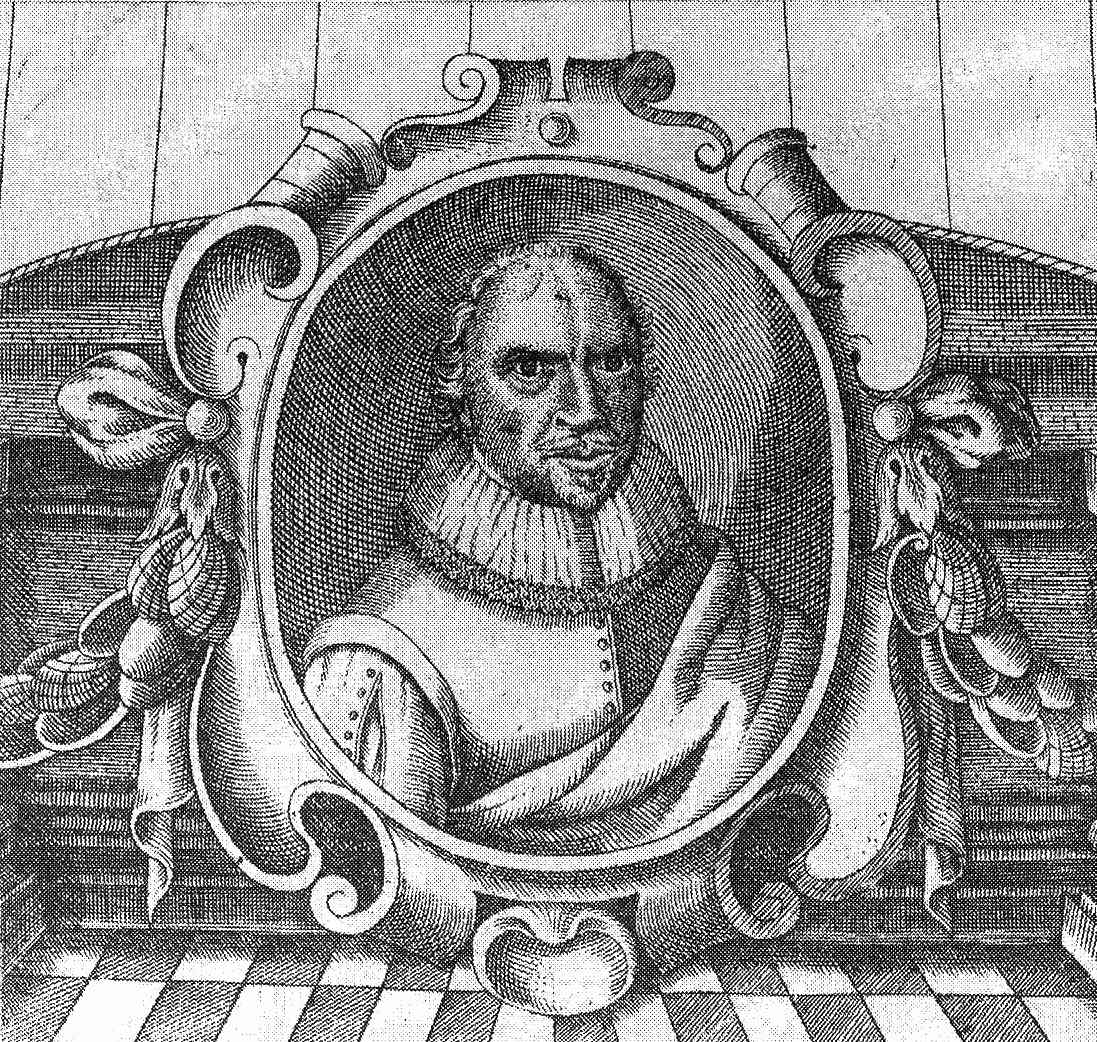
- John Taylor: a portrait engraved by Thomas Cockson, included in Taylor's 1630 poetry anthology
- Born: 24 August 1578; Gloucester, England
- Died: December 1653 (aged 75); London, England
- Occupation: Poet

John Taylor (24 August 1578 – December 1653) was an English poet who dubbed himself "The Water Poet".

== Biography ==
=== Early life ===
John Taylor was born in the parish of St. Ewen's, near South Gate, Gloucester on 24 August 1578.

His parentage is unknown, as the parish registers did not survive the Civil War. He did, however, attend elementary school and grammar school there. His grammar school education may have taken place at the Crypt School in Gloucester, however Taylor never finished his formal education due to difficulties with his Latin studies.

=== Waterman ===
In the early 1590s, after his attempt at grammar school he moved from his home to south London, probably Southwark, to begin an apprenticeship as a waterman. His occupation was one deemed unpopular by the literary elite of London. Watermen were known as drunkards, and often gossips and liars, who attempted to cheat patrons into a higher wage for their service. This occupation would be crafted into an image for Taylor later in his career.

After his waterman apprenticeship he served (1596) in the fleet of the Earl of Essex, and participated in the Capture of Cádiz in that year, and in a voyage to the island of Flores in the Azores in 1597.

He spent much of his life as a Thames waterman, a member of the guild of boatmen that ferried passengers across the River Thames in London, in the days when the London Bridge was the only passage between the banks.

=== Poetry ===
His occupation was his gateway into the literary society of London, as he ferried patrons, actors, and playwrights across the Thames to the Bankside theatres. In 1620, Taylor claimed almost 20,000 men lived by this trade, including dependents and servants, and in 1641, he believed there were over 40,000 in the company itself. He became a member of the ruling oligarchy of the guild, serving as its clerk; it is mainly through his writings that history is familiar with the watermen's disputes of 1641–42, in which an attempt was made to democratize the leadership of the company. He details the uprisings in the pamphlets John Taylors Manifestation ... and To the Right Honorable Assembly ... (Commons Petition), and in John Taylors Last Voyage and Adventure of 1641.

Taylor discusses the watermen's disputes with the theatre companies (who moved the theatres from the south bank to the north in 1612, depriving the ferries of traffic) in The True Cause of the Watermen's Suit Concerning Players (written in 1613 or 1614). The move of theatres from the south bank to the north took a huge toll on Taylor's income, and despite at that time being in the company of the King's Watermen, he could not sway the king to prevent the move.

He also addresses the coachmen, in his tract An Arrant Thief (1622); recent development of horse-drawn carriages with spring suspension, and use of them for hire on land, had taken much trade away from the watermen. An Arrant Thief says:

All sorts of men, work all the means they can,
To make a Thief of every waterman :
And as it were in one consent they join,
To trot by land i' th' dirt, and save their coin.
Carroaches, coaches, jades, and Flanders mares,
Do rob us of our shares, our wares, our fares :
Against the ground, we stand and knock our heels,
Whilst all our profit runs away on wheels;
And, whosoever but observes and notes,
The great increase of coaches and of boats,
Shall find their number more than e'er they were,
By half and more, within these thirty years.
Then watermen at sea had service still,
And those that staid at home had work at will :
Then upstart Hell-cart-coaches were to seek,
A man could scarce see twenty in a week;
But now I think a man may daily see,
More than the wherrys on the Thames can be.
When Queen Elizabeth came to the crown,
A coach in England then was scarcely known,
Then 'twas as rare to see one, as to spy
A Tradesman that had never told a lie.

Taylor was also the first poet to mention the deaths of William Shakespeare and Francis Beaumont in print, in his 1620 poem, "The Praise of Hemp-seed". Both had died four years earlier.

In paper, many a poet now survives
Or else their lines had perish'd with their lives.
Old Chaucer, Gower, and Sir Thomas More,
Sir Philip Sidney, who the laurel wore,
Spenser, and Shakespeare did in art excell,
Sir Edward Dyer, Greene, Nash, Daniel.
Sylvester, Beaumont, Sir John Harrington,
Forgetfulness their works would over run
But that in paper they immortally
Do live in spite of death, and cannot die.

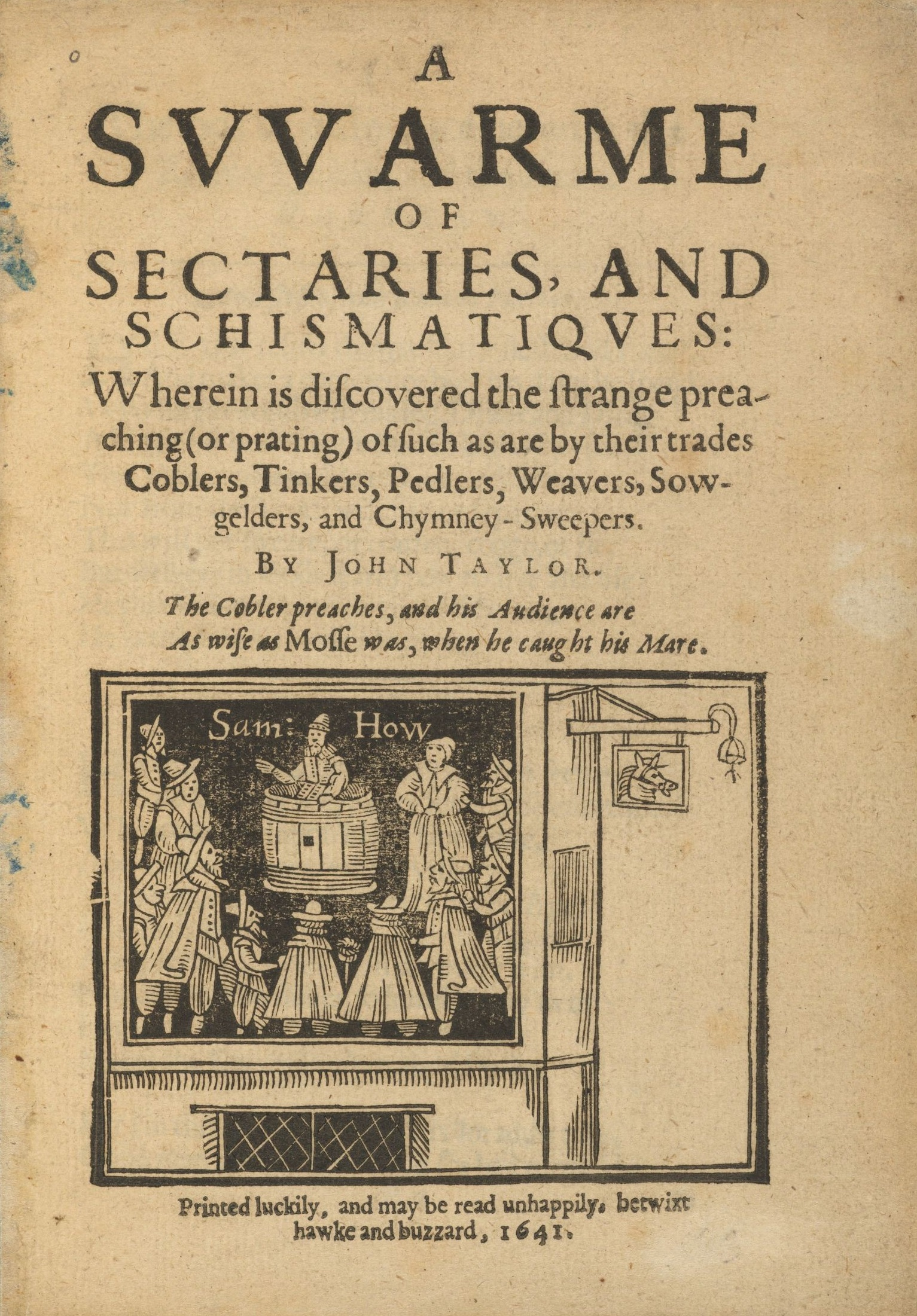
A Swarm of Sectaries, and Schismatiques, 1641

He was a prolific poet, with over one hundred and fifty publications in his lifetime. Many were gathered into the compilation All the Workes of John Taylor the Water Poet (London, 1630; facsimile reprint Scholar Press, Menston, Yorkshire, 1973); augmented by the Spenser Society's edition of the Works of John Taylor ... not included in the Folio edition of 1630 (5 volumes, 1870–78). Although his work was not sophisticated, he was a keen observer of people and styles in the seventeenth century, and his work is often studied by social historians. An example is his 1621 work Taylor's Motto, which included a list of then-current card games and diversions:

The Prodigalls estate, like to a flux,
The Mercer, Draper, and the Silkman sucks:
The Tailor, Millainer, Dogs, Drabs, and Dice,
Trey-trip, or Passage, or the Most at thrice;
At Irish, Tick-tacke, Doublets, Draughts, or Chesse,
He flings his money free with carelessenesse:
At Novum Mumchance, mischance (chuse ye which),
At One and thirty, or at Poor and rich,
Ruffe, slam, Trump, noddy, whisk, hole, sant, New-cut.
Unto the keeping of four Knaves he'l put
His whole estate, at Loadum, or at Gleeke,
At Tickle-me quickly, he's a merry Greeke;
At Primefisto, Post and payre, Primero,
Maw, Whip-her-ginny, he's a lib'rall Hero;
At My-sow-pigg'd: but (Reader never doubt ye,
He's skill'd in all games except) Looke about ye.
Bowles, shove-groate, tennis, no game comes amiss,
His purse a nurse for any body is;
Caroches, Coaches and Tobacconists,
All sorts of people freely from his fists,
His vaine expenses daily suck and soake,
And he himself sucks only drink and smoake:
And thus the Prodigall, himselfe alone
Gives sucke to thousands, and himselfe sucks none.

He achieved notoriety by a series of eccentric journeys: for example, he travelled from London to Queenborough in a paper boat with two stockfish tied to canes for oars, described in "The Praise of Hemp-Seed", which was re-enacted in 2006. From his journey to Scotland in 1618, on which he took no money, Taylor published his Pennyless Pilgrimage. (Ben Jonson walked to Scotland in the same year.) He is one of the few credited early authors of a palindrome: in 1614, he wrote "Lewd did I live, & evil I did dwel". He wrote a poem about Thomas Parr, a man who supposedly lived to the age of 152 and died visiting London in 1635.

Some of Taylor's works include semi-nonsensical passages in fictitious languages he called "Barbarian", "Utopian", and "Barmooda tongue" (or "Barmoodan"), whose respective native speakers were Black Africans, Native Americans, and the settlers or feral hogs in Bermuda. These lampoon Thomas Coryat works and the dedicatory verses in Coryat's Crudities by Henry Peacham and Michael Drayton.

Many of Taylor's works were published by subscription; i.e., he would propose a book, ask for contributors, and write it when he had enough subscribers to undertake the printing costs. He had more than sixteen hundred subscribers to The Pennylesse Pilgrimage; or, the Moneylesse Perambulation of John Taylor, alias the Kings Magesties Water-Poet; How He TRAVAILED on Foot from London to Edenborough in Scotland, Not Carrying any Money To or Fro, Neither Begging, Borrowing, or Asking Meate, Drinke, or Lodging, published in 1618. Those who defaulted on the subscription were chided the following year in a scathing brochure entitled A Kicksey Winsey, or, A Lerry Come-Twang, which he issued in the following year.

By wondrous accident perchance one may
Grope out a needle in a load of hay;
And though a white crow be exceeding rare,
A blind man may (by fortune) catch a hare.
— A Kicksey Winsey, part VII

=== Death ===
Taylor died in London in December 1653 aged 75. He was buried on 5 December at the church of St Martin-in-the-Fields. His widow, Alice, died in January 1658.

== Reception and influence ==
Despite having been one of the most widely read poets in Stuart England, there is a disparity between Taylor's contemporary acclaim and his modern obscurity. His volume of work was immense, resulting in almost 220 titles by 1642. The reach of his work had been broad, due to its use of the vernacular and his many genres, including satires, moral essays, funeral elegies (including an elegy for James I), and travel literature. Taylor ferried himself between the educated elite and the urban working class, bridging a gap in early modern readership that valued quality over quantity. This "cultural amphibian" of a poet struggled with his own cultural identity, remaining on the sidelines of the educated elite, but firmly tied to his occupation as a waterman, which defined his career in literature. This struggle highlights for scholars the gap in readership and literary culture between the elite and working classes in early modern London.

Despite his poor grasp of Latin, John Taylor aspired to be like his idols Thomas Nashe and Ben Jonson, and was heavily criticised by Jonson throughout his career for his lack of grace in his language. Despite failing to enter fully into the world of London's literary elite, Taylor developed a sense of authorial personality which survives his work, and may have been the genesis of the "celebrity" of author, as he carefully crafted his public image throughout his career, beginning with his reworking of his otherwise frowned-upon occupation as a waterman into a name for himself as the King's "Water-Poet". Taylor provided a style of writing that was not bound by the constructs of classical learning, as most poets of the time would have been products of their grammar school education, whether they intended it or not. John Taylor's development of travel literature, which came into popularity in the 1500s, solidified his career and public image, and his travels were often funded through bets made by the public as to whether he would complete his journey.

He entertained no gout, no ache he felt,
The air was good and temperate where he dwelt;
While mavisses and sweet-tongued nightingales
Did chant him roundelays and madrigals.
Thus living within bounds of nature's laws,
Of his long-lasting life may be some cause.
