= Gleek =

Gleek may refer to:

- Gleeking, a type of spitting that usually occurs while yawning
- Gleek (card game), a 16th-century game similar to post and pair
- Gleek (Super Friends), Wonder Twins' pet space monkey in the animated series Super Friends
- A fan of the musical television series Glee.
