= Penneech =

English card game

- "A jolly little two hander"
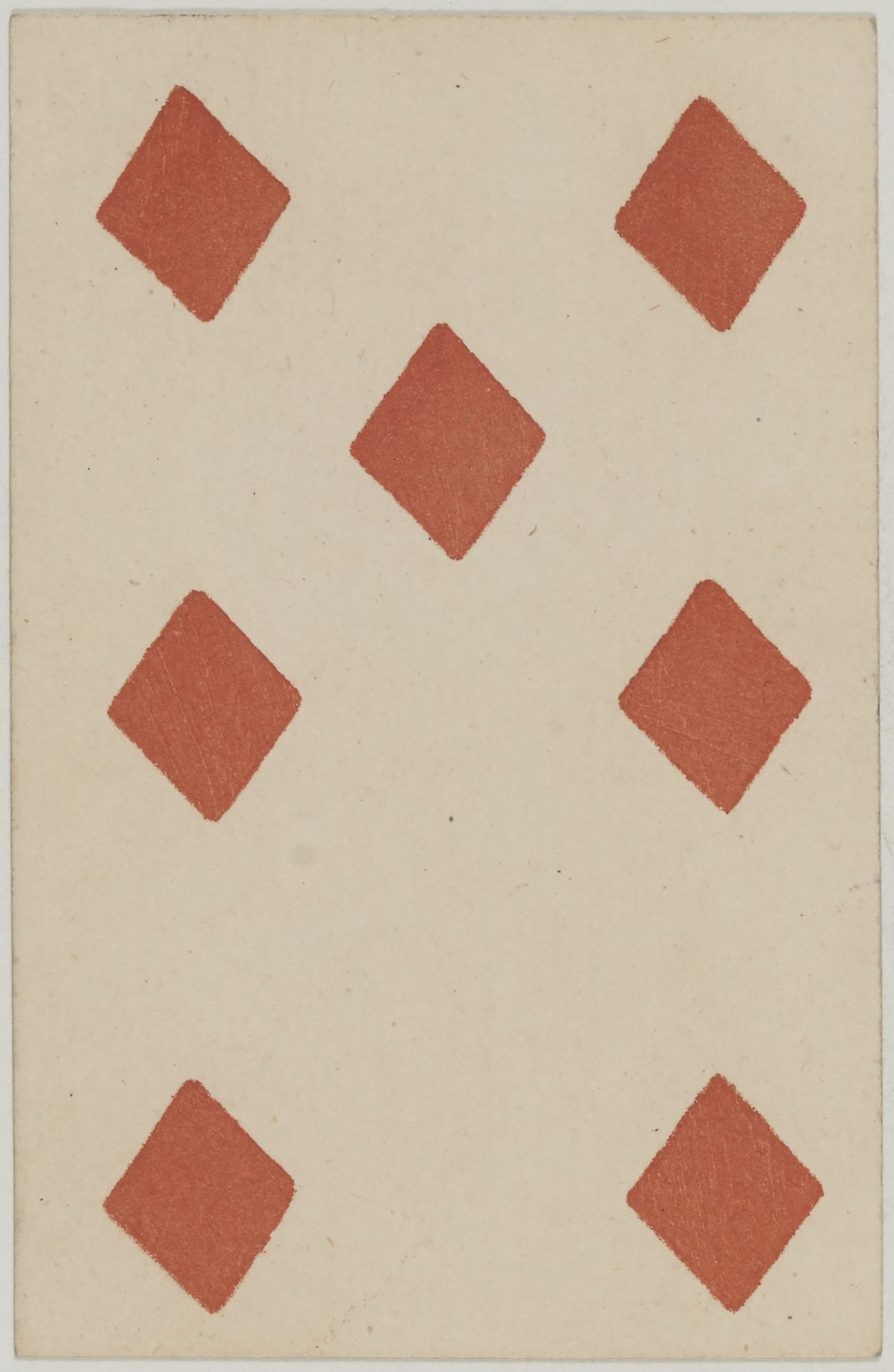
- The Penneech
- Origin: England
- Type: plain-trick game
- Players: 2
- Cards: 52
- Deck: English pattern, French-suited
- Play: Alternate
- Playing time: 12-15 min.
- Unique feature: trumps change with each trick

Penneech or peneech, sometimes called penicth, is an unusual historical English card game for two players played with hands of seven cards. English point-trick games are rare anyway, but the unique feature of this game is that the trump suit changes with each trick. Parlett describes it as a "jolly little two-hander".

== History ==
Penneech was alluded to in Pepys Ballads, II, 98 (1625-1640) by Samuel Pepys, but its rules were first described by Charles Cotton in the 1674 and first edition of The Compleat Gamester, and repeated in all subsequent editions until 1754. There are no other descriptions of the game, although it is mentioned in passing by Holme in 1688 and described as "a game formerly in use" in 1822.

Card games historian David Parlett notes that English point-trick games are rare and knows of no other game in which the trump suit changes from one trick to the next. He tested it extensively in order to reconstruct the rules.

== Cards ==
A standard 52-card pack of English pattern, French-suited cards is used with Aces ranking high.

== Rules ==
The following is a description based on Cotton's rules, supplemented by Parlett who tested the game extensively:

=== Deal ===
Players cut for the first deal, the lower card winning (Aces low for this purpose). The dealer deals 7 cards each, individually, and turns the next for trumps, placing the rest face down as the stock. A player with no Aces nor face cards may throw in their cards for a fresh deal.

=== Play ===
Elder hand leads to the first trick. The second player to a trick may either follow suit or trump, but may only discard if unable to follow. (Note: These rules of play are the same as those of its contemporary, all fours.) The trick winner turns the next card of the stock for trump and pegs its value (see below) if it is a counter before leading to the next trick. The winner of the last trick turns the next card of the stock and likewise scores for it if it is a counting card.

=== Scoring ===
Players score for cards won in tricks, for turning a counter as trumps and for turning a counter after the last trick is taken. An Ace is worth 5 points, a king 4, a queen 3 and a knave 2. The ♦7, called penneech, is the highest card when diamonds are trumps and is worth 14 points when turned or 7 points in the hand. If diamonds are not trumps it has no scoring value, but still ranks as the highest diamond. Players also score 1 point per card taken in excess of seven. Game is 61 points.

Parlett recommends using a cribbage board for scoring.

== Bibliography ==
- _ (1947). Western Folklore. Californian Folklore Society.
- 1674: The Compleat Gamester. A.M, London. Charles Cotton.
- Holme, Randle (1688). The Academy of Armory. Vol 2, ed Jeayes, Roxburgh Club, 1905. BM C.101.h.2.
- Nares, Robert (1822). A Glossary or Collection of Words, Phrases, Names and Allusions to Customs, Proverbs, etc. London: Triphook.
- Parlett, David (1991). A History of Card Games, OUP, Oxford. ISBN 0-19-282905-X
