= Lourche =

Board game

Lourche was a French board game that was played in the 16th and 17th centuries. It was played, like backgammon, on a tables board. The rules of the game have been lost, Furetière (1727) describing it simply as a "kind of trictrac game", trictrac being the name given to the board used for tables games. The game is referred to in the English expression 'left in the lurch', parallel to the French demeurer lourche, referring to the hopeless losing position a player of the game could end up in.

== Names ==
In English the name is variously spelt Lurch or Lurche. In French it is the jeu du Lourche, l'Ourche or Ourche. In German it was called Lorzen, Lurz, Lurtsch or Lurtschspiel

== History ==
The game was listed by Rabelais in his work, Gargantua and Pantagruel, in 1534. In 1586, the English Courtier and Country Gentleman says that "In fowle weather, we send for some honest neighbours, if happely wee bee without wives, alone at home (as seldome we are) and with them we play at Dice and Cards, sorting our selves according to the number of Players, and their skill, some in Ticktacke, some Lurche, some to Irish game, or Dublets."

Shakespeare also alludes to Lourche, both in Coriolanus and the Merry Wives of Windsor. Addison (1892) notes that the game is also recorded as Ourche which "suggests that lourche stands for l'ourche, the initial 'l' being merely the definite article," and that ourche may have meant the 'pool' i.e. the pot into which the stakes were placed and thus may have an origin in the Latin urceus, a "pitcher" or "vase". Godefroy (1888) confirms that the game was known in French as Ourche and distinguished from Trictrac.

Samuel Johnson, citing Skinner, says that Lurch derives from l'Ourche, "a game of draughts much used among the Dutch", and that l'Ourche in turn comes from the Latin orca, "box" or "corner".

H.J.R. Murray simply records that 16th century works "often refer to a game of tables called lurch ... though none describes it."

== Literature ==
- Addison, Joseph (1892). "Rural Manners" in Selections from The Spectator, London/NY: Macmillan, pp. 177–179.
- Brand, John and William Carew Hazlitt (1870). Customs and Ceremonies. London: John Russell Smith.
- Furetière, Antoine, Abbé de Chalivoi (1727). Dictionnaire Universel. Vol. 3 (L–P).
- Godefroy, Frédéric (1888). Dictionnaire de l'ancienne langue française et de tous ses dialectes du IXe au XVe Siècle. Vol. 5 (Liste–Parsomme). Paris: Vieweg.
- Grimm, Jacob and Wilhelm Grimm (1885). Deutsches Wörterbuch. Vol. 6. Leipzig: S. Hirzel.
- Irving, Henry and Frank A. Marshall, eds. (1889). The Works of William Shakespeare. Vol. VI. NY: Scribner & Welford.
- Johnson, Samuel (1765). A Dictionary of the English Language. Vol. 2 (L–Z). London: Johnson etc.
- Murray, H.J.R (1952). A History of Board-Games Other than Chess. Oxford: Clarendon.
- Rabelais, Francois (1534). Gargantua and Pantagruel in Oeuvres de Rabelais: éd. variorum, augmentées de pièces inédites..., Volume 1. Paris: Dalibon.
- Skeat, Walter William (1893). A Concise Etymological Dictionary of the English Language. NY: Harper.
