= Quarante de Roi =

- An early point-trick game
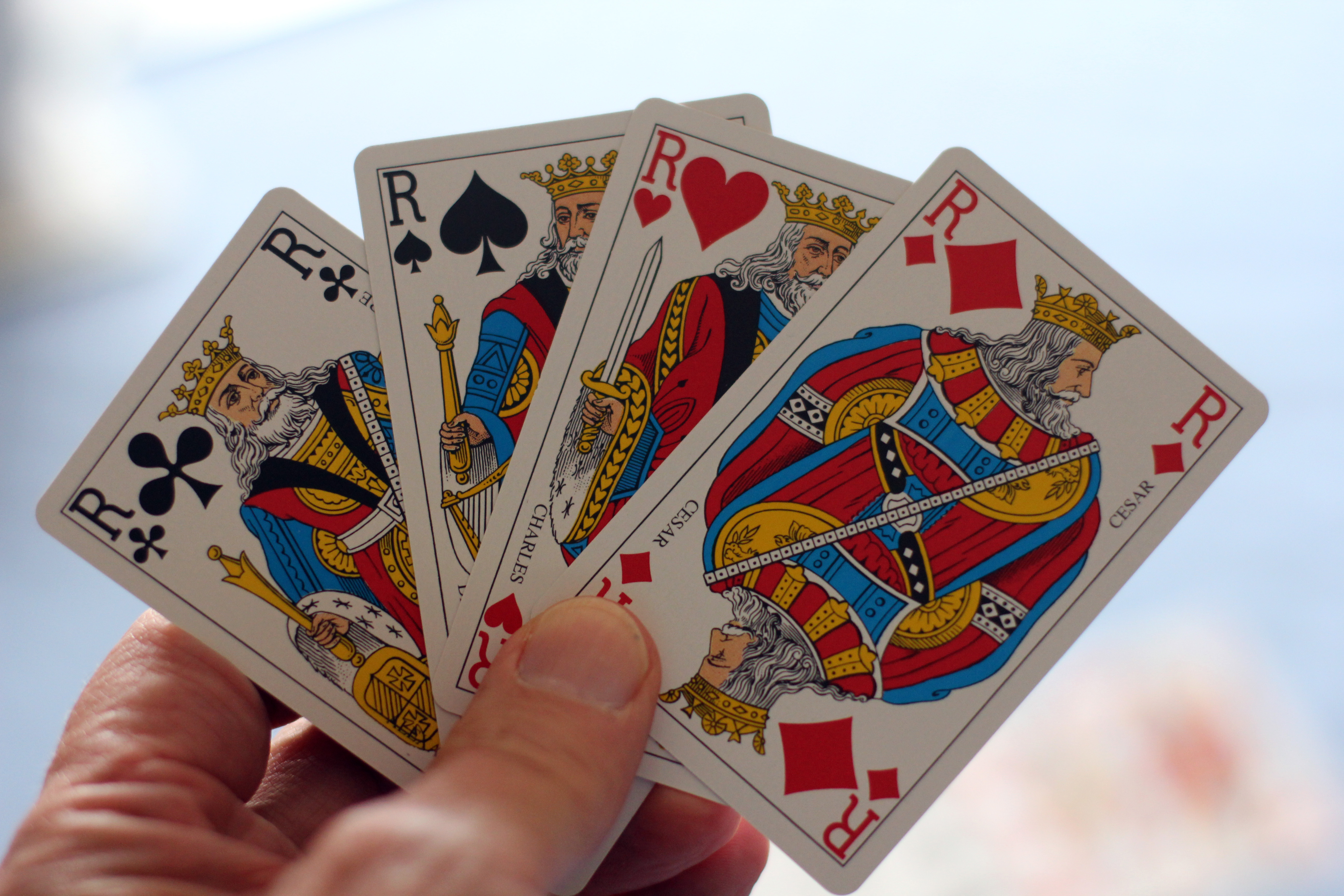
- Four Kings - the highest clique
- Origin: France
- Alternative names: Quarante de Roi, Vierzig vom König
- Type: Point-trick game
- Players: 4 (2 x 2)
- Cards: 32
- Deck: French-suited, Paris pattern
- Play: Clockwise

Related games
- Manille, Tresette

Quarante de Roi ("Forty for Kings") or Quarante de Rois is an historical French, point-trick, card game for four players in partnerships of two. The name comes from its highest scoring combination of four Kings which is worth 40 points.

== History ==
The earliest mention of Quarante de Roi was published in 1772, but its point schedule and Ace ranking suggest greater antiquity. An 1850 French source includes it in a list of games played in Lorraine between 1495 and 1601, although the reference cited mentions a game called Quarante-Trois or Quarantrois.

The name of a set or clique used in the game may be a corruption of glique, a word used in the Metz dialogue in a game called Dix-Croix ("Ten-Cross"). This game had the same scoring scheme for the gliques as Quarante de Roi has for the cliques and they may have been the same game under different names. According to Le Duchat, the derivation of the term glique was the German word glück ("luck"). Alternatively it may be derived from gleich ("same") which is the German in several card games for a set. See also Gleek.

== Rules ==
The following rules are based on Lacombe (1792) and have been described as the "official rules" as they have been reprinted multiple times since without any changes.

=== Players and cards ===
Quarante de Roi is a game for four players playing in 2 teams of two, the partners sitting opposite one another. The cards rank as at Triomphe: K (high) Q J A 10 9 8 7 (low). Deal and play are anticlockwise. The aim is to score the most points in tricks, the cards being valued as follows:

Ranks and point-values of cards
Rank	K	Q	J	A	10	9	8	7
Value	5	4	3	–				

=== Preliminaries ===
The cards are dealt out, anticlockwise and one by one. When a King is dealt, that player receives no more cards. Once the four Kings are dealt, those with the two red Kings form one team and those with the two black Kings, the other.

=== Deal ===
The cards are fanned on the table and players draw one card each. The one with the highest card becomes the first dealer. In the event of a tie, the two players concerned re-draw a card and the highest wins. For this purpose cards rank in their natural order, Aces high. Dealer shuffles, offers to the left for cutting and deals 8 cards each (2-3-2) before turning the last card face up for trumps. This card belongs to the dealer who collects it on playing his first card.

=== Play ===
First hand leads to the first trick; thereafter the trick winner leads to the next trick. Players must follow suit; otherwise may play any card. The trick is won by the highest trump or the highest card of the led suit if no trumps are played.

=== Cliques ===
A player with a set of three or four court cards held in the hand before the start of play has a clique and may declare it and score points if it is the highest or only set. The value of the cliques is as follows:

- 3 Jacks – 6 points
- 3 Queens – 8 points
- 3 Kings – 10 points
- 4 Jacks – 13 points
- 4 Queens – 20 points
- 4 Kings – 40 points

To count, cliques must be declared on playing to the first trick. To do so, a player states the number of cards in the set e.g. "Three cards" or "Four cards". If two or more players have the same number then, beginning with first hand, they declare the rank. However, a clique that has been beaten by an earlier player need not be declared; instead the player may just say "It's good" or "Good". Only one clique counts; thus the player with the highest or only clique scores the relevant points for it; the remainder score nothing. A clique must be declared to count; however, a player may choose not to declare a clique if it is felt that it would reveal too much information for the number of points gained.

=== Ending ===
A game is played over a number of deals, the dealer rotating to the right. The scores are kept by one of the players who chalks up a table with two columns headed "them" and "us". Game is usually 150 points.

== Literature ==
- Lacombe, Jacques (1792). Encyclopédie Méthodique: Dictionnaire des jeux, Paris: Panckoucke.
- Parlett, David (1991). A History of Card Games, OUP, Oxford. ISBN 0-19-282905-X
