= Francis Willughby's Book of Games =

2003 book

Francis Willughby's Book of Games is a book published in 2003 that printed for the first time a transcription of a seventeenth-century manuscript written by Francis Willughby that was held in the library of the University of Nottingham. The modern edition was edited by Jeffrey L Forgeng, Dorothy Johnston, and David Cram, and was published by Ashgate Publishing Company with ISBN 1-85928-460-4. The manuscript was left incomplete when Willughby died at the age of 36, but even in its unfinished state it provides an unrivalled insight into the sports and games of his period.

Among the features of the book include descriptions of card games that are otherwise only known from reference in literature. It also includes the first formal study of children's board games to be written in a European language; investigation of the original manuscript has revealed that some of the descriptions of children's games were actually written by an unknown child, with later corrections being made by Willughby.

== Card games ==
There is a general introduction about card games and then the following are described in detail:

- One and Thirtie (Thirty One)
- One and Thirtie Bon Ace
- Hannikin Canst Abide It, an English version of Quinze
- Laugh & Ly Downe
- Nodde, also spelt Noddy, a precursor to Cribbage
- Cribbidge (Cribbage) and variants called "A New Cribbidge or Nodde" and "Double Hand Cribbidge"
- Ruffe & Trump, a form of Ruff and Honours
- Gleeke, also spelt Gleek
- Beast, or Le Beste, English version of the French La Bête
- Loosing Lodum and a variant called Winning Loadum
- Ging (Note: Elsewhere known as Jing.) or Seven Cards
- Put, an old English gambling game
- Wheehee, a children's game

== Tables games ==
There is a general introduction, "Tables", on the equipment used for tables games followed by detailed accounts of the following:

- Dublets
- Ticktack
- Irish, the immediate ancestor of Backgammon
- Back Gammon (Backgammon)
- Long Laurence, not a tables game but a gambling game with an elongated die

== Bibliography ==
- Forgeng, Jeff, Dorothy Johnston and David Cram (2003). Francis Willughby's Book of Games. Ashgate Press. ISBN 1 85928 460 4.
- Willughby, Francis. A Volume of Plaies. (Manuscript in the Middleton collection, University of Nottingham, shelfmark Li 113.) c1665-70.
- Willughby, Francis, volume containing descriptions of games and pastimes ("Francis Willughby's Book of Games"), c.1660–1672. Manuscript in the Middleton collection, University of Nottingham; document reference Mi LM 14
