= Wit and reason =

Card game

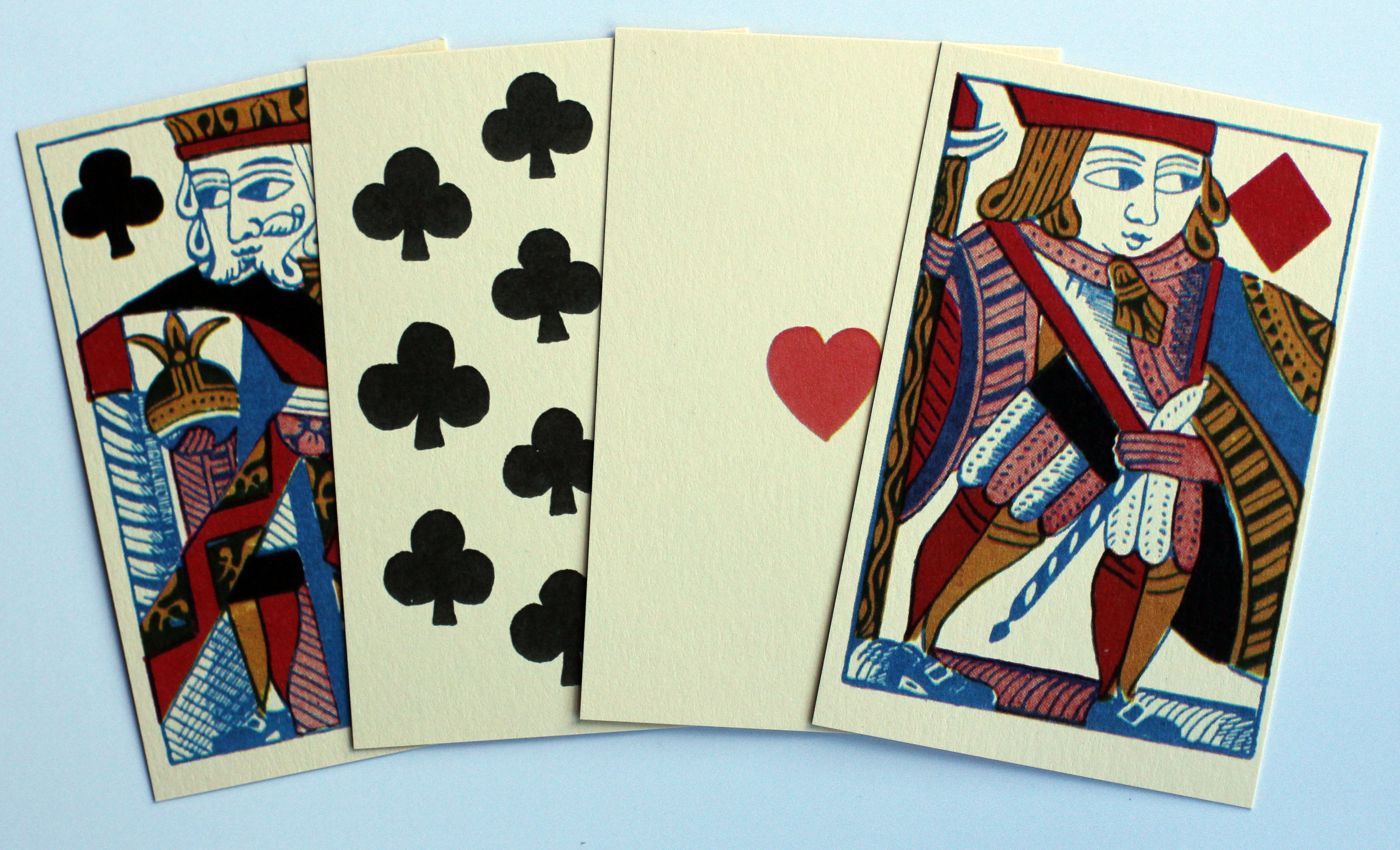
- "Thirty-one!"
- Origin: England
- Players: 2
- Cards: 52
- Deck: English pattern, French-suited
- Play: Alternate

Wit and reason is an historical English card game for two players that "seems easy at first to the learner, but in his practice and observation he will find it otherwise." It is reminiscent of thirty-one.

== History ==
The rules of wit and reason are first described by Charles Cotton in the first edition of his compendium, The Compleat Gamester, in 1674; and reprinted in subsequent editions up to 1754. In 1816, Singer reprints the rules in his Researches.

Parlett says that the game "results, like Noughts & Crosses, in a foregone conclusion."

== Cards ==
The game is played with a standard 52-card pack of English pattern, French-suited cards. Aces are low. Courts count as 10 and all the numerals count their face value.

== Rules ==
The following rules are based on Johnson's edition:

One player has all the red cards; the adversary has all the black. They cut for the lead, the leader having a "great advantage."

The leader plays any card announcing its value. Players then alternate playing a card to the table, announcing the cumulative total. A player who cannot play a card without exceeding a total of 31, must pass. The player who makes the total up to exactly 31, wins.

== Bibliography ==
- Cotton, Charles (1674) The Compleat Gamester. London: A.M.
- Johnson, Charles (1754). The Compleat Gamester. 8th edn. London: J. Hodges.
- Parlett, David (2008). The Penguin Book of Card Games, Penguin, London. ISBN 978-0-141-03787-5
- Singer, Samuel Weller (1816). Researches Into the History of Playing Cards and Printing. London: Bensley.
