= Richard Seymour (18th-century writer) =

18th-century English editor and author

Richard Seymour (died c. 1750) was an 18th-century English editor and writer, most noted for publishing the later editions of Charles Cotton's historic work, The Compleat Gamester.

== Works (selection) ==
Charles Cotton edited the first edition of The Compleat Gamester in 1676. This was one of the earliest known English-language games compendia. It was followed by a 2nd edition in 1709 by an unknown editor. Richard Seymour took over from the 3rd edition in 1721 and continued to edit the compendium until 1750. In parallel, he published The Court Gamester from 1719 to 1728 which was "written for the use of young princesses."

=== The Compleat Gamester ===
- 1721: The Compleat Gamester. J. Wilford, London. Seymour
- 1725: The Compleat Gamester, 5th edn with additions. J. Wilford, London. Unknown ed.
- 1726: The Compleat Gamester, 6th edn with additions. Wilford, London. Unknown ed.
- 1734: The Compleat Gamester, 5th edn. E. Curll / J. Wilford. London. Edited by Richard Seymour.
- 1739: The Compleat Gamester, 6th edn. Curll/Hodges, London. Edited by Richard Seymour.
- 1750: The Compleat Gamester, 7th edn. J. Hodges, London. Edited by Richard Seymour.

=== The Court Gamester ===
- 1718: The Court Gamester, London: Curll.
- 1719: The Court Gamester, London: Curll.
- 1720: The Court Gamester, London: Curll.
- 1722: The Court Gamester, London: Curll.
- 1728: The Court Gamester, London: Curll.
