= Bone ace =

English gambling game

- "A licking game for money"
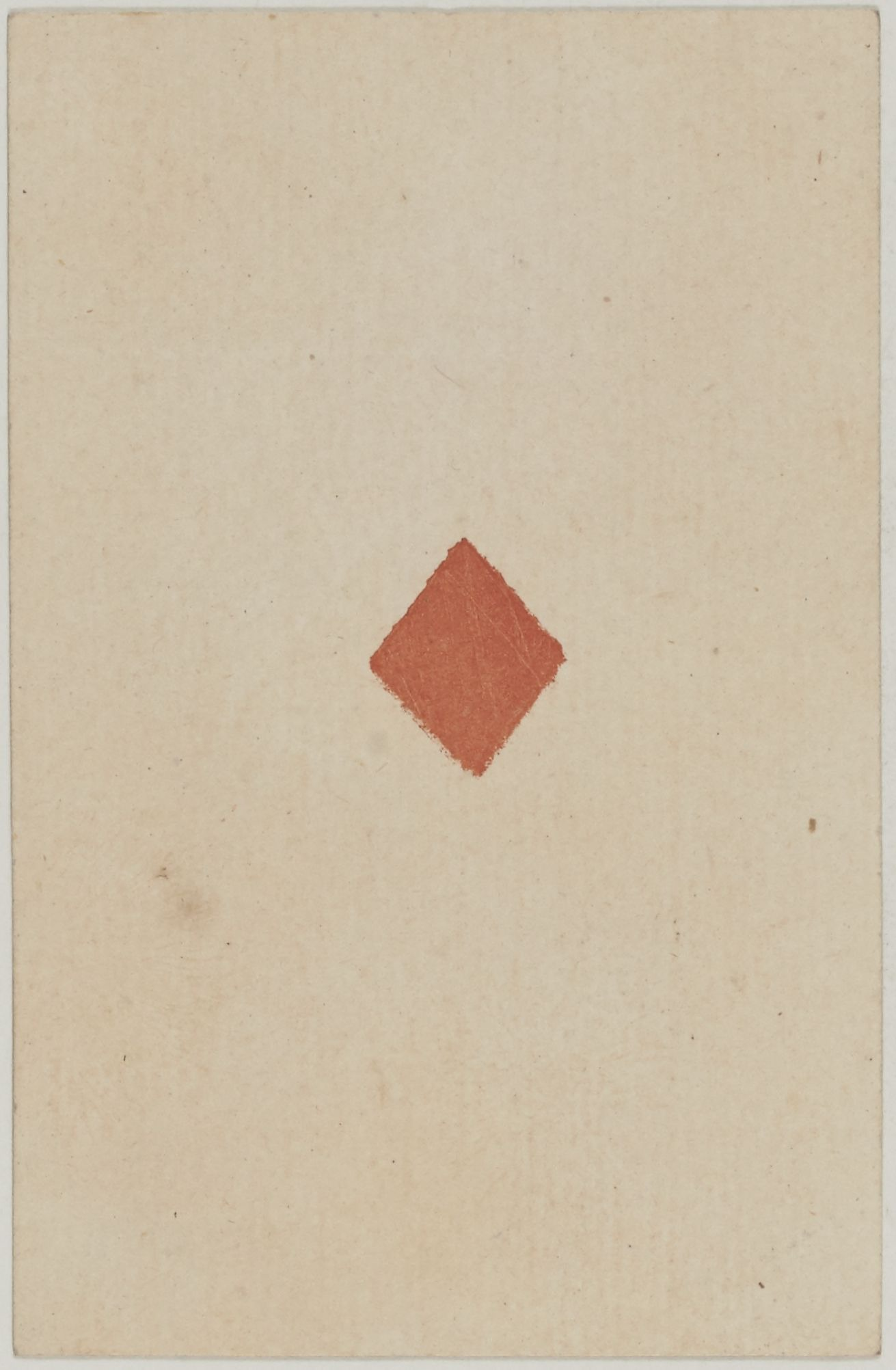
- The bone ace
- Origin: England
- Alternative names: Bone-ace, bon ace
- Type: Fishing game
- Players: 7 or 8
- Cards: 52
- Deck: English pattern, French-suited

Bone-ace or bon ace is an historical English gambling game using playing cards for seven or eight players that appears related to Thirty-One.

== History ==
Bone-ace is recorded as early as 1611 in John Florio's The World of Wordes, but its rules first appear in 1674 in Cotton's The Compleat Gamester where he describes it as "trivial and very inconsiderable...by reason of the little variety therein contein'd [sic], but because I have seen Ladies and Persons of quality have plaid at it for their diversion, I will briefly describe it, and the rather because it is a licking Game for Money."

== Cards ==
The game is named after the ace of diamonds, the bone-ace, presumably meaning "good ace", the word 'bone' coming from the French word bon(ne). The bone-ace, also called the bon ace, is the commanding card and beats all the others. Otherwise a standard 52-card pack of English pattern, French-suited cards is used with aces ranking high. Suits are irrelevant, numeral cards score their face value, court cards score ten points each and aces score eleven.

== Rules ==
According to Cotton, the game is played by seven or eight players who cut for the deal, the player cutting the lowest card having the honour. This is described as "a great disadvantage; for that makes the Dealer youngest hand." Players ante their stakes to a pool. The dealer then gives two cards, face down, to first hand, turns the third card, also for first hand, and then continues dealing three cards in like manner to the remaining players The player with the highest upcard now "carries the Bone" i.e. takes half the pool; the rest goes to the winner of 'Game'.

In the second phase, cards are turned and the player with a score of exactly 31 or, if no-one has 31, the player nearest to 31, wins Game. Presumably if there is a tie in either phase, positional priority applies i.e. the player who received their cards first wins. However, Cotton is silent on that point.
