= Laugh and lie down =

English card game

- The earliest European fishing game
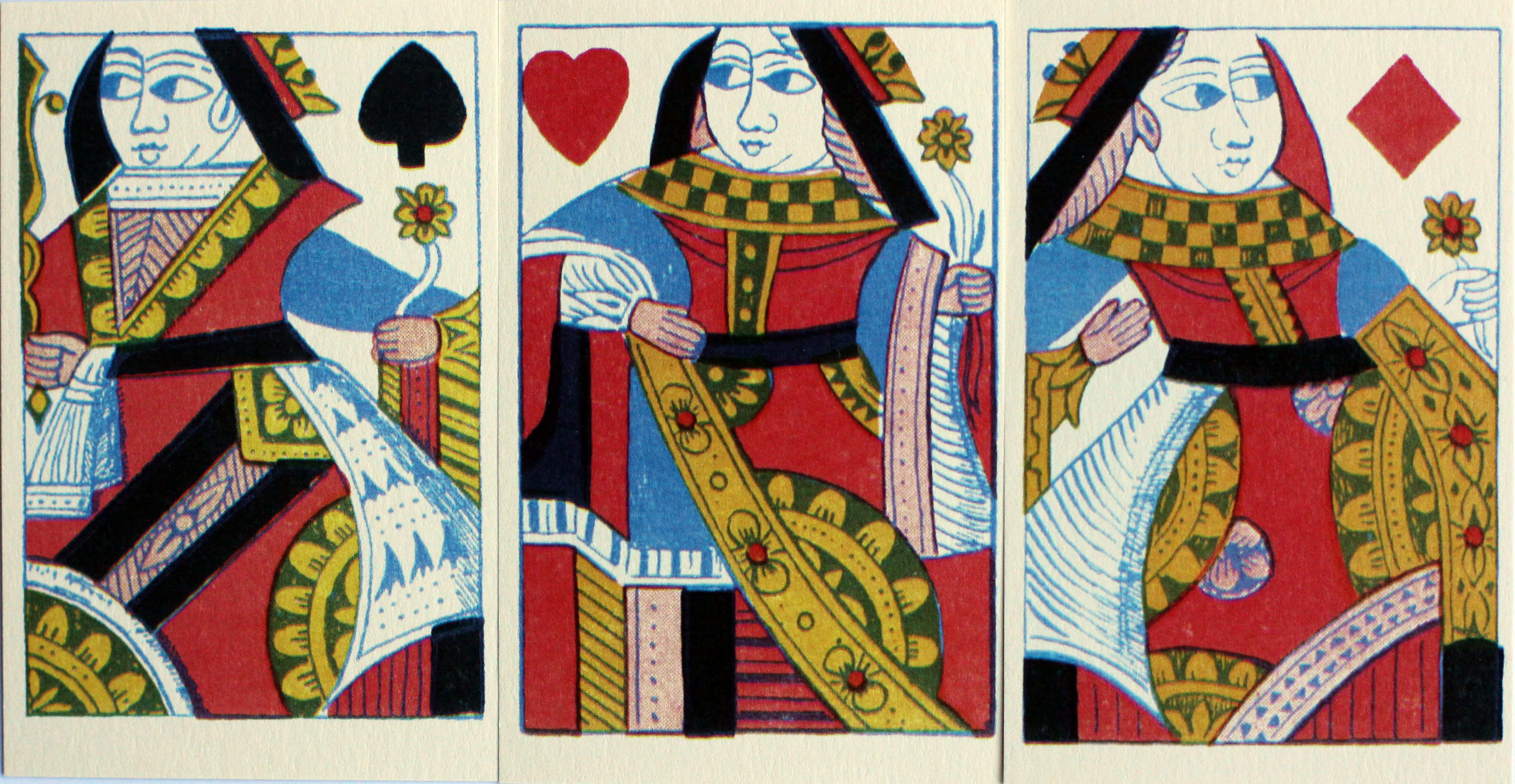
- A Prial of three Queens
- Origin: England
- Alternative names: Laugh and Lay Down
- Type: Fishing
- Players: 5
- Cards: 52
- Deck: English pattern, French-suited
- Play: Clockwise

Laugh and lie down or laugh and lay down is an historical English card game for five players and the earliest example of a European game of the fishing family.

== History ==
Laugh and lie down is first recorded in 1522, but until this century its rules were only described by Francis Willughby in his Book of Games circa 1660–1672.

== Cards ==
The game is played with a standard 52-card pack of English pattern, French-suited cards. Aces are low.

== Rules ==
The following rules are based on Willughby who calls it Laugh and Ly Downe. The aim is to be the last player left holding cards in the hand.

The game is for five players who cut for the first deal, lowest prevailing. Deal and play are clockwise. The dealer antes 3 chip or coins to the pot and the remaining players 2 each. The dealer then deals 8 cards each, individually and face down. The remaining 12 cards are scattered randomly and face up on the table.

Players check their hands to identify any prials (three of a kind) or mournivals (four of a kind). They may immediately place down two cards from a prial or all four of a mournival.

Players now aim to capture cards in pairs, a pair being two of a kind e.g. two Kings. Each pair won is placed face up in front of the player. Eldest hand begins by playing a hand card to capture one or three table cards of the same rank. A pair may be played to capture a pair and a prial to capture a singleton. If a player holds a pair and another card of that rank is captured from the table, the player may lay down the pair immediately (even out of turn) since it cannot be won by matching with table cards.

Players unable to capture must throw their cards face up onto the table to add to the melee and drop out. When all bar one player have done this, play ends. The cards of the last player with cards and all remaining table cards are added to the dealer's won cards. Whoever took the last trick wins 5 chips from the pot. Players winning fewer than eight cards pay a chip to the pot for every two cards card they fell short by and those winning more than eight cards collect a chip for every two cards in excess of eight. This should clear the pot.

== Bibliography ==
- Mason, George (1801). A Supplement to Johnson's English Dictionary. London: Roworth.
- Parlett, David (2008). The Penguin Book of Card Games, Penguin, London. ISBN 978-0-141-03787-5
- Skelton (1522). Why not to Court. Cited in the OED.
- Willughby, Francis. A Volume of Plaies. (Manuscript in the Middleton collection, University of Nottingham, shelfmark Li 113.) c1665-70. published in Francis Willughby's Book of Games in 2003 by Jeff Forgeng, Dorothy Johnston and David Cram (2003). Ashgate Press. ISBN 1 85928 460 4.(2003).
