= Losing lodam =

Card game

- The only English ace–ten game
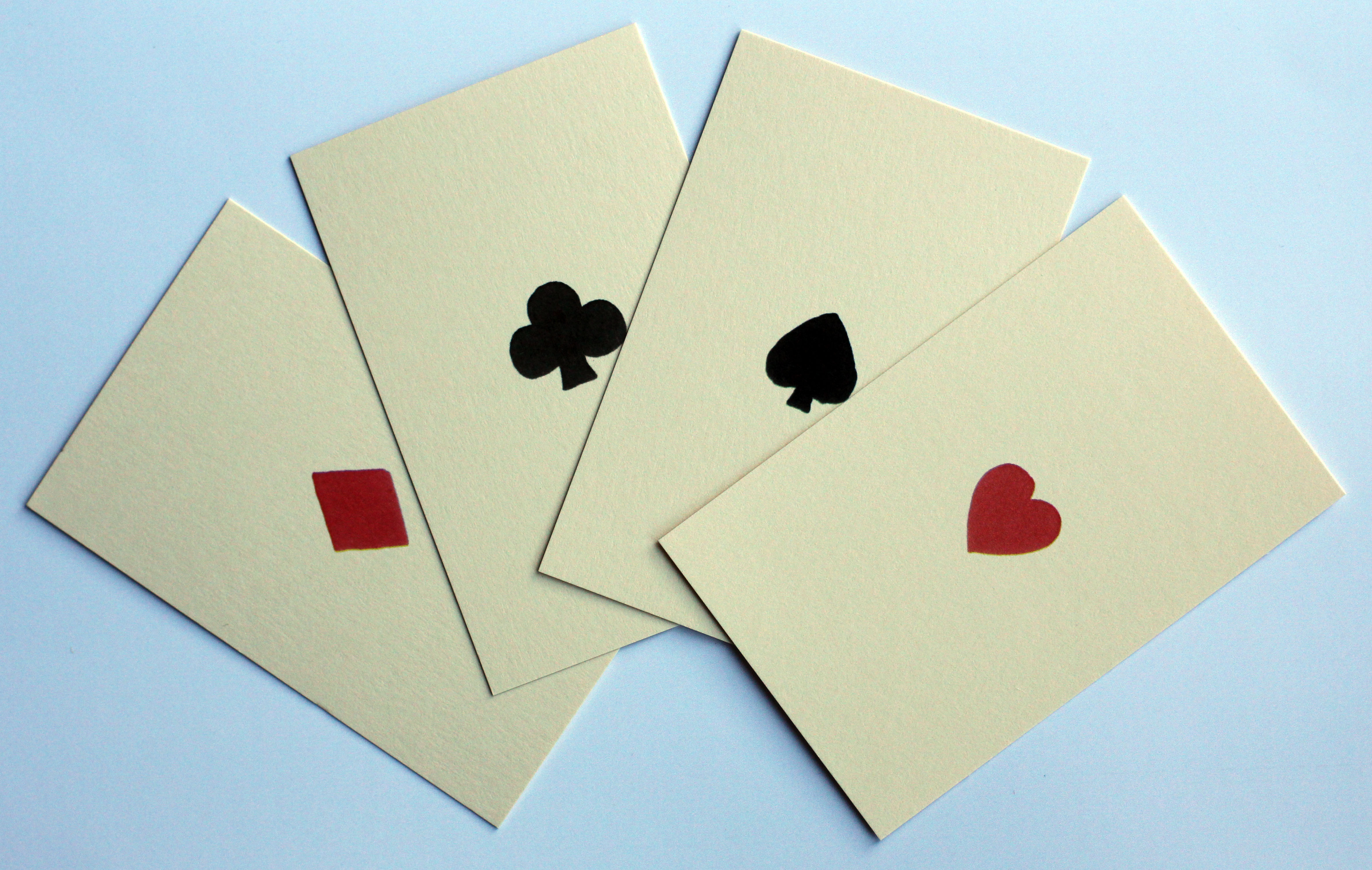
- The four highest loaders
- Alternative names: Lodam, loadam, losing lodum, loosing loadem, losing loadum; at losing, load him
- Type: Trick-taking
- Players: 3–10
- Skills: Card counting, Tactics
- Cards: 52-card
- Deck: French
- Rank (high→low): A K Q J 10 9 8 7 6 5 4 3 2
- Play: Clockwise
- Notes: ace–ten scoring

Losing lodam is an historical English card game for three or more players. It is a 'negative' game like hearts whereby the aim is to avoid taking tricks with certain cards known as loaders. Ulf Martin has described it as "an early version of Ramsch."

== Names ==
The game is variously called lodam, loadam, losing lodam, losing lodum, loosing loadem, losing loadum or at losing, load him.

== History ==
The earliest English record dates to 1591 where the game is referred to as "lodam", but the only description appears in Francis Willughby's 1665 book, A Volume of Plaies. It may be the game listed by Rabelais as coquinbert qui gaigne perd in 1534, although conquinbert is later equated to reversis, another negative game. According to Sir John Harrington it succeeded Maw in court fashion. Lewknor wrote in 1613 that James I lost 3 sets of lodam at 10 shillings a set and flew into a rage.

It is an early example of a game using a form of the ace–ten scoring system and the only English ace–ten game. It may have Dutch influence.

== Rules ==
The following rules are based on Willughby:

=== Cards ===
A standard 52-card pack is used with aces ranking high. The aim is to avoid taking tricks with certain cards known as loaders which have various penalty point values. These are the ace 11, ten 10, king 3, queen 2 and knave 1. The remaining cards are non-counters.

=== Preliminaries ===
The game is described for five players although, by adjusting the number of table cards and cards dealt other numbers may play. (Note: Parlett reckons three to ten may play.) At the outset, players receive 3 gaming counters each. When a player goes out, he loses a counter and once he has lost all three, he is out of the game.

Players ante an agreed stake and the last player in the game sweeps the pool.

Deal and play are clockwise. The cards are dealt out with everyone receiving the same number of cards, any left over being put aside, face down, as a talon.

=== Play ===
Eldest hand leads to the first trick. Players must follow suit if able; otherwise may renounce i.e. play a card of any other suit. There are no trumps to begin with. The first person to renounce, turns the top card of the talon, announces its suit which is then trumps for the deal, and then replaces it face down. The rules for trick play, however, stay the same: follow suit if possible, otherwise play any card, which may be a trump. The trick is taken by the highest trump or highest card of the led suit if no trumps were played. The trick winner leads to the next trick.

Once a player has amassed 31 or more penalty points in loaders, he drops out and loses a counter. Play ends immediately and the deal rotates to the left. If all the tricks are played out, the player with the highest point score loses that deal and a counter.

Challenging

When a player reaches 31 or more card points, they may challenge another player to prove that they have not amassed 31 in tricks. Points in tricks are counted up and the player in error loses a life.

Exchanging

If a player has an unguarded loader, he may offer an exchange to the other players between tricks. If it is a court he says "a coat for a coat"; if it is an Ace or Ten he says "a card for a card." A player wishing to exchange may swap a card of the same type (court or Ace/Ten). If they turn out to be the same suit, the exchange is void and players retain their original cards.

Swallowing

Once a trump suit is determined, if a player takes a trick with a trump in it without noticing, it is called swallowing and the trick stands.

=== Winning ===
Once a player loses their third counter, he or she is out of the game. The last player left in, wins and sweeps the pool.

== Winning Lodam ==
Willughby also describes a forward version of the game called winning lodam which he has never seen, but in which he supposes that the aim is to win "as manie tricks as have 31 in them". (Note: As taking 31 points in one trick is unlikely even in a partnership game, it is more likely to have been played for straight points.) Although Cram and Forgeng cast doubt on whether the game actually existed, it is recorded in 1719 in a list of card games thus: "Winning Loadum, the Lawyer's Game; Lossing Loadum, the Client's Game."

== Bibliography ==
- Apperson, George L. (1884). "Lodam" in Notes and Queries, No. 261, 27 December 1884.
- Dodd, Charles (1861). Dodd's Church History of England from the Commencement of the Sixteenth Century to the Revolution in 1688. Vol. 4. London: Charles Dolman.
- Willughby, Francis (1665). A Volume of Plaies, (ms.) published as Francis Willughby's Book of Games by David Cram and Jeffrey L. Forgeng (2003). Oxford: Routledge.
