= Ticktack =

14th-century board game

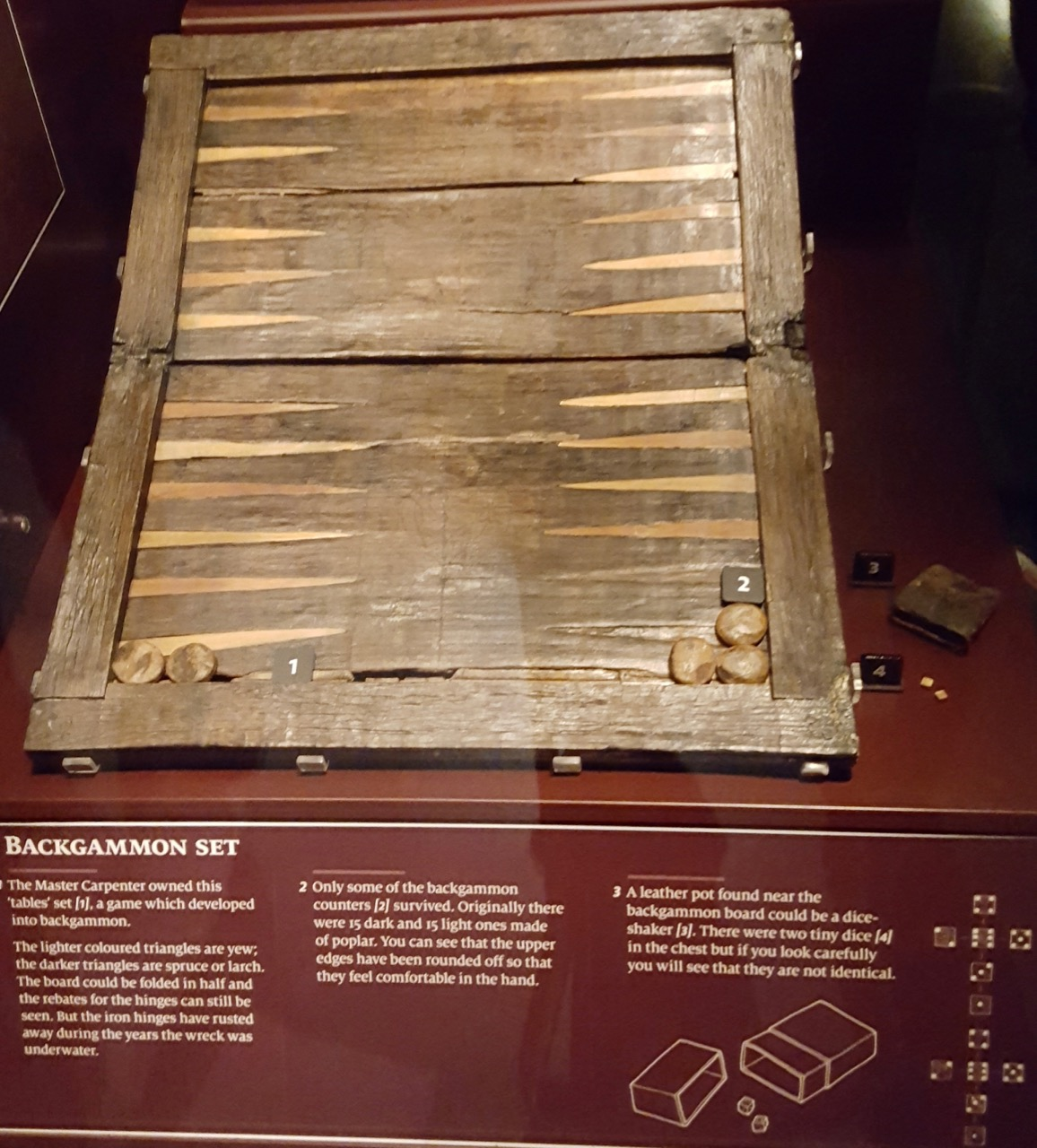
- Tables board from the Mary Rose
- Other names: Tick-Tack
- Genres: Board game Dice game
- Players: 2
- Movement: contrary
- Chance: Medium (dice rolling)
- Skills: Strategy, tactics, counting
- Related games: English • Irish • French Trictrac

Ticktack or Tick-Tack, is an historical English tables game for two players using a board similar to that used today for Backgammon and other tables games. Like its much more elaborate French counterpart, Trictrac, it has the unusual feature that there are several different ways in which it can be won, including Toots and Rovers.

== History ==
Ticktack is mentioned as early as 1586 as a game played by English country gentlemen in inclement weather along with three other games of the tables family: Lurch, Irish and Doublets. The earliest and only comprehensive set of rules appeared in 1672 by Willughby. However, Cotton gives an overview in The Compleat Gamester of 1674, an account which was reprinted until 1754, after which the game faded from view, being reported in Halliwell-Phillips (1881) as archaic.

== Name ==
Willughby says that the name Ticktack came from the rule that if a man is touched, it must be played. Cotton agrees and likens it to "touch" and "take". However, the game appears to be related to French Trictrac – there are several common features – which was commonly thought to derive from the rattling noise of the dice being thrown against the side rail of the board, however, Fiske suggests it may be "merely alliterative reduplication (having reference to the route taken by the men), signifying a forward and back movement after the manner of 'zig-zag'; or it may be the application... of an onomatopoetic word already existing (signifying any sharp, clattering sound)."

== Players and equipment ==
Ticktack was a game for two players using two dice and 15 men apiece, and played on a tables board (see illustration) with 12 playing positions or points on each side. In Willughby's diagram of the board, the points are numbered from 1 to 12 on each side of the board, the numbers running in parallel. He refers to the board as having two tables, which are the two halves of the board – left and right. (Note: It is also common in tables games for 'table' to refer to a quadrant of the board.)

== Rules ==
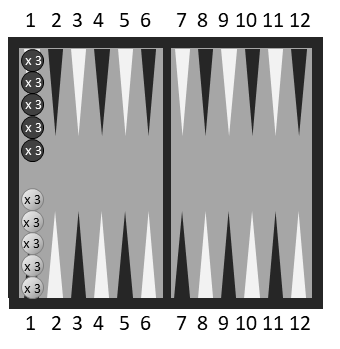
Ticktack – the starting layout. White sits at the top.

The notation used in Willughby's original MS is illustrated. In this case, Black sits at the top and assembles all 15 men on the home point: the 1 point at the top in this case. White sits at the bottom and assembles all 15 white pieces likewise on point 1 at the bottom of the board.

Black's aim is to move the 15 black pieces clockwise around the board from their first point along the remaining 11 points on the home side and then in the reverse direction on the far side of the board towards the bearing table before bearing them off. Meanwhile, White moves anticlockwise from point 1 to point 12 on the home side, then around to the far side of the board to the bearing table on Black's side and bears off from there.

To move their men, players roll the dice and assign each roll to one man, moving it the corresponding number of points forward. Two rolls may be combined e.g. a 4 and 3 may be used to move a man 7 points. Men may move to any point except one occupied by two or more opposing men.

Willughby explains certain terms:

- Taking a point means playing 2 men onto it in the same turn (it therefore cannot be occupied by the opponent's men nor can its men be 'hit').
- Binding a man is to add a second man to a point already occupied by a man of the same colour.
- Binding at length is when this is done using a two throws for one man.
- Playing at length is simply to use two throws for one move.
- Playing at Home is when a player is playing men on the nearest side. Also called playing in his owne Tables.
- Playing from Home means moving all the men out from the starting point and off around the board.
- A blot is one man on a point and within 12 or fewer points of opposing men.
- A blot of a die is one man on a point within 6 or fewer points of opposing men.
- Hitting a blot is playing a man onto a point occupied by just one adverse man.

A point may be occupied by as many men as a player desires. A man may be played to any vacant point; or to one that has men of the same colour or to one that is occupied by just one enemy man. A point occupied by two or more opposing men may not be played to nor may a man be 'played at length' (moved by the sum of two dice) if the intermediate point is so occupied.

=== Winning ===
An unusual feature of Ticktack is that there are five different ways of winning:

1. Hitting a blot. This is the most common and is worth a single game.
2. Tootes or Toots. Strictly this is when all the points in the last quadrant (the home quadrant) are taken by the player. However taking all the points in any of the four quadrants is a win and scores double. Optional.
3. Rovers. If a player can occupy the 12th and 13th points from home with one man each and no other men have left the home point (point 1), this wins double. Optional.
4. Two Corners. If a player either takes points 12 and 13 or points 1 and 24 (the opponent's point 1 in Willughby's notation) simultaneously, that player wins a double game. Keeping two men on point 1 is called keeping your sweetheart; if a player is forced to move one of them it is called breaking your sweetheart or losing your sweetheart.
5. Bearing Off. If a player is able to bear off all 15 men over point 24 the game is won double. Willughby suggest this is very rare.

If a player fails to spot that he could win, the opponent may say "Why not?" and claim the victory. A player may also raise by saying "I vie", whereupon the opponent must concede the game or hold by saying "I see it." The first vie doubles the game, the second trebles it and so on.

==== Variation ====
Cotton described a slightly different scheme. In the "plain game", players win a single game for hitting a blot or a double game either for filling up all the points in their second table or for taking the adversary's point 11. (Note: It is not clear whether the player only needs to take point 11 or also needs to have secured points 5 and 6 as well.) Cotton states that some play the game with Toots (= Toutes above), Boveries (= Rovers) and Flyers. (Note: Toots, Boveries and Flyers presumably win double, but Cotton is not explicit.) Boveries means having a man on one's own and one's opponents point 11s. The last named feat is that of bringing a man around the tables before the opponent has moved out of the first table on the opponent's home side. Cotton does not mention bearing off. In summary, Cotton's scheme is:

1. Hitting a blot - single win
2. Filling the 2nd table - double win
3. Point 11 - double win
4. Toots (filling the 1st table) – optional
5. Boveries – optional
6. Flyers – optional

== Related games ==
Several sources equate Ticktack to the French game of Trictrac. (Note: For example, Boyer (1714), p. 202, and Baird (2020), p. 176.) which, although it has similar features, is considerably more complicated. It is possible, however, that Ticktack evolved as a simplified version of Trictrac.

== Literature ==
- Baird, Caroline (2020). Games and Gaming in Early Modern Drama: Stakes and Hazards. Palgrave Macmillan.
- Boyer, Abel (1714). The Compleat French Master. London: Richard Sore.
- Cotton, Charles (1674). The Compleat Gamester. London: A.M. OCLC 558875155.
- Fiske, Willard (1905). Chess in Iceland and in Icelandic Literature: with Historical Notes on Other Table-Games. Florence: The Floretine Typographical Society.
- Forgeng, Jeff; Johnston, Dorothy; Cram, David, eds. (2003). Francis Willughby's Book of Games. Farnham: Ashgate. ISBN 1-85928-460-4. (Critical edition of Willughby's volume containing descriptions of games and pastimes, c.1660–1672. Manuscript in the Middleton collection, University of Nottingham; document reference Mi LM 14)
- Lee, Sir Sidney (1890). Stratford on Avon: From the Earliest Times to the Death of Shakespeare. Seeley and Co.
- Willughby, Francis (1672) Manuscript in the Middleton collection, University of Nottingham; document reference Mi LM 14.
