= Randle Cotgrave =

English lexicographer

Randle Cotgrave was an English lexicographer. In 1611, he compiled and published A Dictionarie of the French and English Tongues, a bilingual dictionary that represented a breakthrough at the time and remains historically important.

== Life and work ==
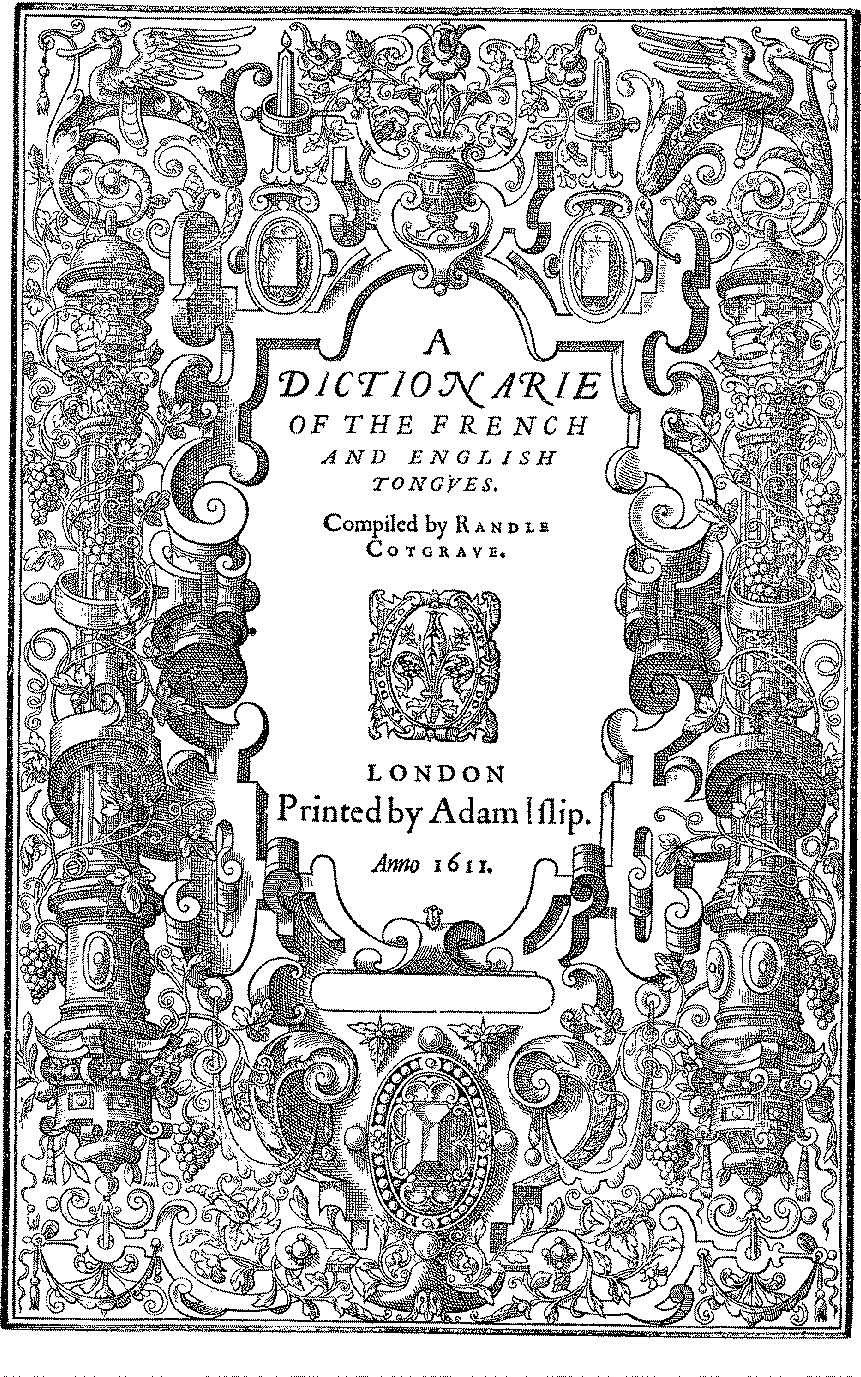
A Dictionarie of the French and English Tongues compiled by Cotgrave in London, 1611.

Cotgrave was born into a Cheshire family and is possibly be identifiable as Randal, the son of William Cotgreve of Christleton in Cheshire (died c. 1634), who was mentioned in a pedigree of the Cotgreve family in Harley MS 1500, fol. 118. He was educated at Cambridge University, and entered St John's College, Cambridge, through the Lady Margaret foundation, on 10 November 1587. He later became secretary to William Cecil, Lord Burghley, the eldest son of Thomas, the first earl of Exeter. In his dedication of his dictionary to Burghley, Cotgrave credits his patron with "all that he is or has been for many years," and thanked him for his kindness in "so often dispensing with the ordinary assistance of an ordinary servant." The dictionary first appeared in 1611. It included many French proverbs, English equivalents, and a few Latin phrases. Cotgrave's dictionary, though not free of ludicrous mistakes, was for its time an unusually careful and intelligent piece of lexicography, still referred to by students of English and of French philology.

A second edition was published in 1632, together with an English-French dictionary by Robert Sherwood. Later editions, revised and enlarged by James Howell appeared in 1650, 1660 and 1673. Cotgrave presented a copy of the first edition to Henry Frederick, Prince of Wales, eldest son of James I, and received from him a gift of ten pounds.

Two autograph letters of Cotgrave are extant, addressed to M. Beaulieu, secretary to the British ambassador at Paris. The first, dated 27 November 1610, relates to the progress being made with printing his dictionary, saying he had received valuable help from Beaulieu himself and from a Mr Limery. In the second letter, he informed Beaulieu that he sent his correspondent two copies of his book and requests payment of twenty-two shillings, "which they cost me, who have not been provident enough to reserve any of them, and therefore am forced to be beholden for them to a base and mechanical generation, that suffers no respect to weigh down a private gain." Thus it appears that Cotgrave was still in Lord Burghley's service.

If he is the same as the "Randal Cotgreve" of the Harleian MS, he later became registrar to the Bishop of Chester and married Ellinor Taylor of that city, by whom he had four sons, William, Randolf, Robert and Alexander, and a daughter Mary. The 1632 edition of the dictionary was evidently taken through the press by the author, the year of whose death is given in Cooper's "Memorials of Cambridge" as 1634. In fact, he died in 1652 and was buried at St Bartholomew the Great church, London, on 21 March.
