= Gleek (card game) =

English card game

- 16th century English vying game
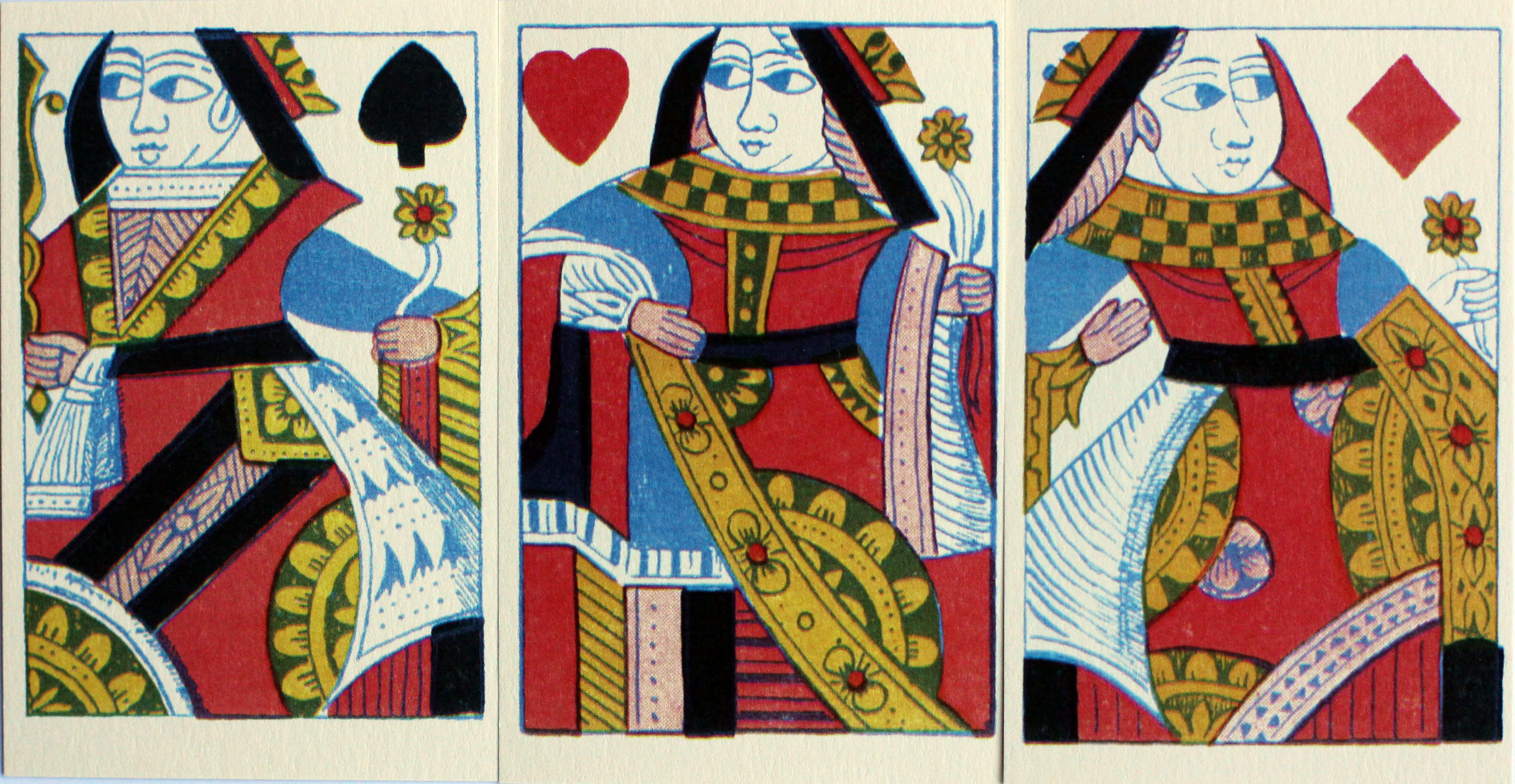
- A Gleek of three Queens
- Origin: England
- Type: Vying game
- Players: 3
- Cards: 44 (no 2s or 3s)
- Deck: English pattern, French-suited
- Play: Clockwise

Gleek is an English card game for three people. It is played with a 44-card pack and was popular from the 16th century through the 18th century.

== History ==
Gleek (sometimes spelled Gleeke or Gleke) is mentioned in several publications during the first half of the 16th century. The earliest known reference to Gleek has been traced by Sir Michael Dummett to Henry Watson's The chirche of the euyll men and women (1511). However, the game called Gleek in that era more closely resembled the French game of Glic, the earliest record of which dates to 1454. Early French Glic closely resembled the German game of Poch which did not have a trick-taking round. The best contemporary descriptions of Gleek in popular English form come from three sources: John Cotgrave (1662), Francis Willughby (about 1670), and Charles Cotton (1674).

=== Etymology ===
From the Old French word glic ("a game of cards").

== Rules ==
Three players must be present for this game. Gleek was a fairly elaborate game in four main stages:

1. Bid for Stock
2. Vie for Ruff
3. Gleeks and Mournivals
4. Play Tricks

Cards are ranked Ace, King, Queen, Jack, 10, 9, 8, 7, 6, 5, 4. (No 2s or 3s)

To begin, the dealer deals 12 cards to each player, 4 at a time. The remaining 8 cards are placed face-down on the table, stacked, and the top card is turned up to determine the trump.

=== Bid for Stock ===
This is the stage where players bid for the right to draw card replacements in hope of improving their hand. Only the highest bidder may do this.

Go around, bidding for the stock (the remaining 7 face-down cards). Bidding begins at 13 pence. According to Willughby, the Eldest must open bidding.

Go around, raising 1 penny at a time, until no one raises. The winner pays out the amount bid, dividing it between the other two players.

Winner of the Stock must discard 7 cards, then take in the stock. (Note that there are varying views on this: Parlett and Dafydd say to take in the stock first, then discard 7. Cotgrave and Cotton are unclear, but Willughby is quite clear that you discard first.)

=== Vie for Ruff ===
This is the stage where players vie (bet) for who has the best ruff: the highest value of cards in a suit, counting court cards at 10 each, aces at 11 and numerals at face value (similar to the 'point' in Piquet). For example, a hand of 2♦ 3♦ 5♦ 6♦ 7♦ A♥ 3♥ 4♥ 5♣ 9♣ Q♣ 9♠ has its highest ruff in clubs; 24.

A "ruff" refers to a suit, so the winner of the Ruff has the highest value of cards in a suit.

Everyone tosses tuppence into the pot as an ante and then bids begin. The first to bid may vie or pass; the others may see and re-vie, or pass. To vie or revie, players put tuppence into the pot; this declares that you think you can win the Ruff. (Similar to a raise in Poker.) To pass, say, "I'll have nothing to do with it". If a player says this, then he is out of the Ruff. (Similar to a fold in Poker.) To see, simply match the vies that have been made since it last came to you; you must see before you can revie.

It is not clear whether an initial pass (before the first vie) takes you out of the bidding (as it clearly does after the vie), or serves like a Poker "check", letting you see the first vie.

The Ruff ends when the bidding returns to the last player who vied. At this point, any player still in the Ruff shows the relevant cards, and the winner takes the pot. The whole process is very like Poker, but with only one kind of hand.

=== Gleeks and Mournivals ===
This is the stage where players declare sets of cards known as Mournivals and Gleeks.

Mournivals are four of a kind and Gleeks are three of a kind. A Mournival of Aces is worth 8 pence from each opponent. A Mournival of Kings: 6; a Mournival of Queens: 4; and a Mournival of Knaves: 2. Other four of a kind suits are irrelevant.

A Gleek of Aces is worth 4 pence. A Gleek of Kings: 3; a Gleek of Queens: 2, and a Gleek of Knaves: 1.

It is not clear whether players must show these cards upon declaration.

=== Play Tricks ===
This is the stage where players play their cards in tricks. Twelve tricks are played.

In this final stage, players play out 12 tricks as normal. The eldest leads this stage to the first of 12 tricks. Players must follow suit if they can, but may otherwise play any card. The trick is taken by the highest card of the suit led, or by the highest trump if any are played, and the winner of each trick leads to the next. It is somewhat unclear between extant versions of the rules as to whether or not any card of the trump suit beats all other cards of the lead suit or if the card of the trump suit needs to be of equal or greater value than the tricks played of the lead suit. For example, in the version where the trump always wins, a 5 of the trump suit would beat a Queen of the lead suit but in the version where the trump suit must be of equal or greater value then only the Queen, King or Ace of the trump suit can beat a Queen of the lead suit. In all versions, only tricks played of the lead suit or trump suit can win a trick, any other played suit is valueless. Each trick provides a particular score and certain trumps add an additional value.

If a player holds a Tiddy (the trump Four), he may claim a consolation of 2 pence from each opponent, either at start of play or when he plays it to a trick. This optional rule may be ignored by prior agreement, as it is often forgotten. If it is allowed, then players should also agree whether to claim similar side payment of 5 pence and 6 pence when a Towser (trump Five) or Tumbler (trump Six), respectively, are played.

=== Scoring ===
At the end of the game, players count 3 points for each trick he has won, and adds to this the point-value of any honours you may have played. Honours are the face cards, and the ace, of the same suit as the trump card. They are scored as follows: Ace (15 points), King (3 points), Queen (3 points), and Jack (9 points). (It is possible, but unlikely, that these points accrue for winning honours in tricks, or winning tricks with honours, rather than for merely having been dealt them.) Furthermore, if the turn-up was an Ace, King, Queen or Jack, the dealer counts it in with his total. This scoring is independent of their trick value, i.e. while a Jack scores 9 points for the player who played it, it would still lose to a Queen or King of the same suit or trump suit played in the same trick.

Each player then either wins or loses the difference between this total and 22. In other words: If your count is less than 22 you pay to the pot a penny for each point by which it falls short of 22, and if it is more you withdraw from the pot a penny for each point in excess of 22. If all honors are in the players' hands, then the total points accrued in the trick-taking stage will be 66. 30 from the value of the honours cards (15+9+3+3) and 36 from the won tricks (12 tricks * 3 points for each trick won). Given there are 66 possible points and three players, a perfectly even game would see each player score 22 points, which is why you subtract 22 from each player's score. This would leave no player to place into the pot and none to take from it.

Gleek is designed to be a zero-sum game, so there should be no remaining chips in the pot at the end; all chips being claimed initially in the ruff showdown and then again settled after the trick scoring. It is possible that an honour card is left in the discard, as there are no specific rules preventing the player who wins the bid for stock from discarding an honour. In this scenario the final scoring will result in a negative cumulative score and therefore a set of chips remaining in the pot at the end. While there is no incentive for any player to do this intentionally, as it is simply throwing away money, it is unclear what should be done in this outcome. It seems reasonable to leave those chips in the pot and have them settled at the conclusion of the next round's vie for ruff, though none of the extant texts handle this scenario.

== Terms ==
- Eldest - The player to the left of the dealer. Between the players, the eldest is the one closest to the left of the dealer.
- Gleek - A set of three equal cards, or "three of a kind".
- Honours - These cards are worth bonus points at the end of the game to the player who wins them in a trick.
- Mournival - A set of four equal cards, or "four of a kind". The highest mournival is Four Aces, which also counts as the highest suit and highest Ruff. This hand beats everything else.
- Ruff - The largest set of same suited cards.
- Tyde/Tiddy - The 4 of Trumps
- Tom - The Jack of Trumps
- Tib - The Ace of Trumps
- Trump - A suit, selected at the beginning of the game, which beats all other suits when taking tricks.

== Literature ==
- Cotgrave, John (1655). Wits Interpreter: The English Parnassus (2nd ed.). London.
- Cotton, Charles (1674). The Complete Gamester. London. pp. 75–80.
- Depaulis, Thierry (1991). "Pochspiel: an 'International' Card Game of the 15th Century. Part II" in The Playing-Card, Vol.XIX, No.3.
- Dummett, Sir Michael (1980). The Game of Tarot. Duckworth, London. ISBN 0 7156 1014 7
- Willughby, Francis. A Volume of Plaies. (Manuscript in the Middleton collection, University of Nottingham, shelfmark Li 113.) c1665-70. Published in Jeff Forgeng; Dorothy Johnston; David Cram, eds. (2003). Francis Willughby's Book of Games. Aldershot, Hants, England: Ashgate. ISBN 1-85928-460-4.
