= Charles Cotton =

English poet and writer (1630–1687)

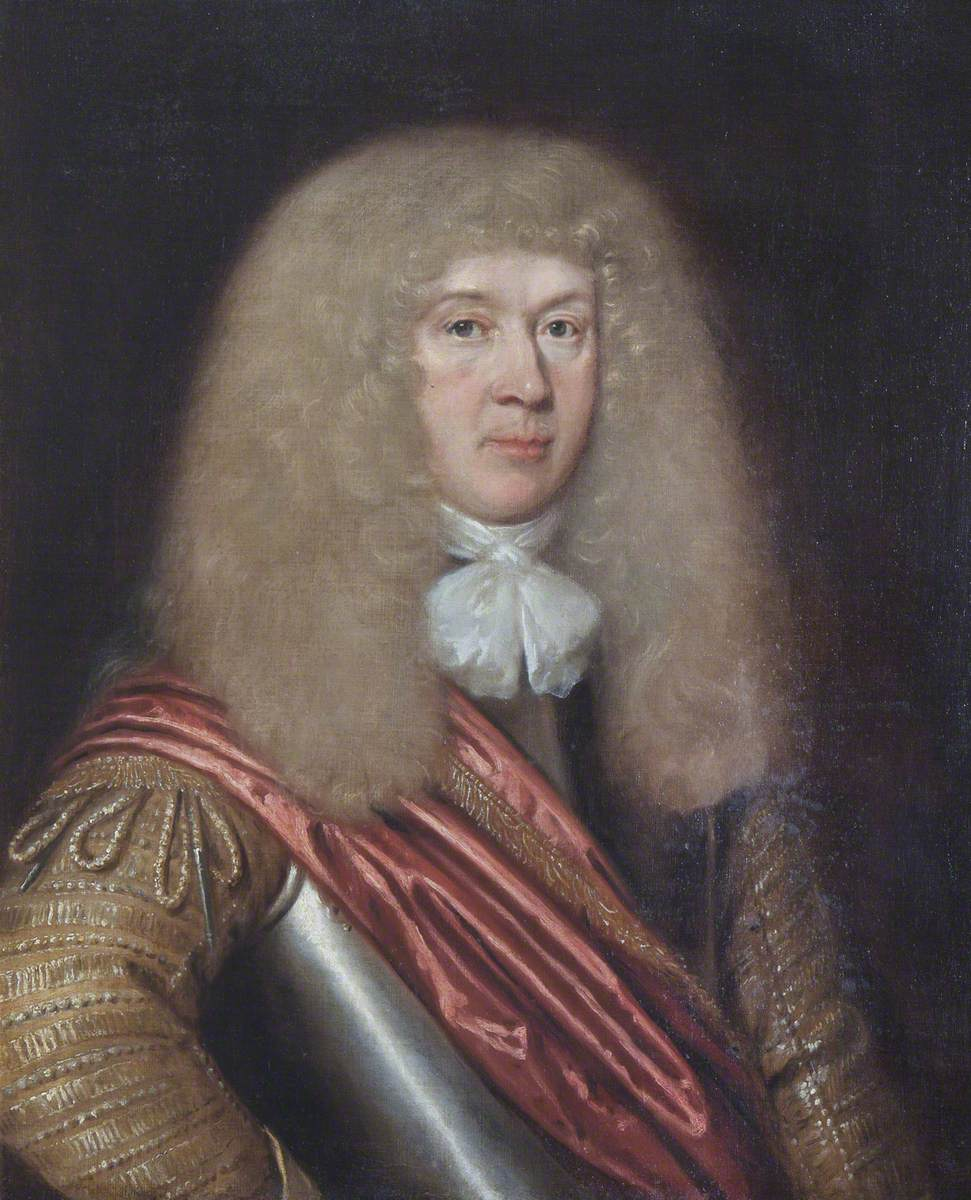
- Born: 28 April 1630; Alstonefield, Staffordshire
- Died: 16 February 1687 (aged 56)
- Occupations: Poet, writer
- Known for: Translation of Montaigne; The Compleat Gamester

Charles Cotton (28 April 1630 – 16 February 1687) was an English poet and writer, best known for translating the work of Michel de Montaigne from French, for his contributions to The Compleat Angler, and for the influential The Compleat Gamester attributed to him.

== Early life ==
He was born in Alstonefield, Staffordshire, at Beresford Hall, near the Derbyshire Peak District. His father, Charles Cotton the Elder, was a friend of Ben Jonson, John Selden, Sir Henry Wotton and Izaak Walton. The son was apparently not sent to university, but was tutored by Ralph Rawson, one of the fellows ejected from Brasenose College, Oxford, in 1648. Cotton travelled in France and perhaps in Italy, and at the age of twenty-eight he succeeded to an estate greatly encumbered by lawsuits during his father's lifetime. Like many Royalist gentlemen after the English Civil War the rest of his life was spent chiefly in quiet country pursuits, in Cotton's case in the Peak District and north Staffordshire. His Voyage to Ireland in Burlesque (1670) states that he held a Captain's commission and served in Ireland.

== Fishing ==
His friendship with Izaak Walton began about 1655, and contradicts any assumptions about Cotton's character based on his coarse burlesques of Virgil and Lucian. Walton's initials, made into a cipher with Cotton's own, were placed over the door of Cotton's fishing cottage on the Dove near Hartington. Cotton contributed a second section "Instructions how to angle for a trout or grayling in a clear stream", to Walton's The Compleat Angler; the additions consisted of twelve chapters on fishing in clear water, which he understood largely but not exclusively to be fly fishing. Another addition to the volume was Cotton's well-known poem "The Retirement", which appeared from the 5th edition onwards.

== Marriages ==
In 1656, he married his cousin Isabella Hutchinson, the daughter of Thomas Hutchinson, M.P. for Nottingham. She was a half-sister of Col. John Hutchinson; They had one child, Catherine Cotton, who married Sir Berkeley Lucy, 3rd Baronet. Isebella (Hutchinson) Cotton, died in 1670. At the request of his wife's sister, Miss Stanhope Hutchinson, he undertook the translation of Pierre Corneille's Horace in 1671. In 1675, he married Mary Cromwell, the dowager Countess of Ardglass; she had a jointure of £1500 a year, but he did not have the power to spend it.

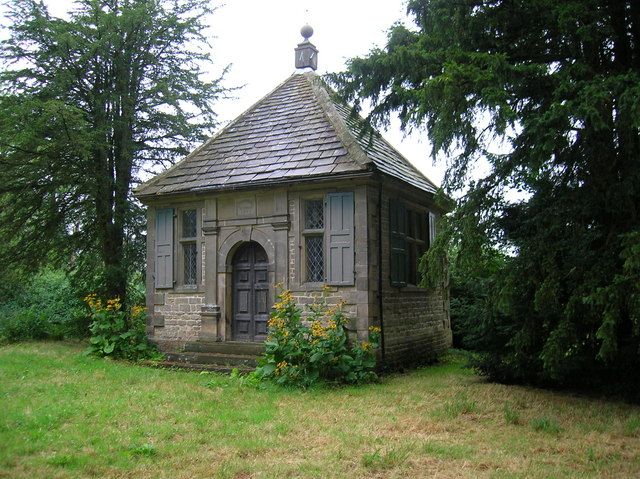
Charles Cotton's Fishing House, built in 1674 on the Banks of the River Dove. Cotton lived in nearby Beresford Hall and practised his sport on the trout and grayling of the River Dove.

== Writings ==
The 1674 first edition of The Compleat Gamester is attributed to Cotton by publishers of later editions, to which additional, post-Cotton material was added in 1709 and 1725, along with some updates to the rules Cotton had described earlier. The book was considered the "standard" English-language reference work on the playing of games – especially gambling games, and including billiards, card games, dice, horse racing and cock fighting, among others – until the publication of Edmond Hoyle's Mr. Hoyle's Games Complete in 1750, which outsold Cotton's then-obsolete work.

At Cotton's death in 1687 he was insolvent and left his estates to his creditors. He was buried in St James's Church, Piccadilly, on 16 February 1687.

Cotton's reputation as a burlesque writer may account for the neglect with which the rest of his poems have been treated. Their excellence was not, however, overlooked by good critics. Coleridge praises the purity and unaffectedness of his style in Biographia Literaria, and Wordsworth (Preface, 1815) gave a copious quotation from the "Ode to Winter". The "Retirement" is printed by Walton in the second part of the Compleat Angler.

He was a Derbyshire man who loved the Peak District and wrote a long topographic poem describing it: his father had moved there from the south of England, to live on his wife's estates. In Cotton's day, in the decades after the Civil War, the inaccessibility of good fishing spots was physical as well as legal. The opening chapters of his section of the Compleat Angler draw Cotton and his friend across a savage and mountainous landscape. The friend, who will be taught fly-fishing, expresses doubt as to whether they are still in Christendom:

"What do I think? Why, I think it is the steepest place that ever sure men and horses went down; and that, if there be any safety at all, the safest way is to alight..." says the pupil. After he picked his way down, they reach a bridge. "Do you ... travel with wheelbarrows in this country" he asks. "Because this bridge certainly was made for nothing else; why, a mouse can hardly go over it: it is not two fingers broad."

They come at length to the sheltered valley in which stands Cotton's house and fishing hut. It is the first description of paradise in fishing history. "It stands in a kind of peninsula, with a delicate clear river about it." There Cotton and his friend breakfast on ale and a pipe of tobacco to give them the strength to wield their rods. For a trout river, he says, a rod of five or six yards should be long enough. In fact, "longer, though never so neatly and artificially made, it ought not to be, if you intend to fish at ease".

Though he used a light line of carefully tapered horse-hair, Cotton's rod, of solid wood, was heavy. His description of the sport differs from modern fly-casting, which began with the arrival of heavy dressed-silk lines 200 years later. On windy days, he advises his guest to fish the pools because in the rapids, where the gorge of the Dove is narrower, the wind will be too strong for fishing.

Some of Cotton's advice is still useful, as when he tells his guest to fish "fine and far off"; and he argues for small and neat flies, carefully dressed, over the bushy productions of London tackle-dealers. The flies which catch fish will always look wrong to the untrained eye, because they look too small and too delicate.

Cotton's dressings are made with bear hair and camel's under fur, the soft bristles from inside a black hog's ear, and from dog's tails. "What a heap of trumpery is here!" cries his visitor, when Cotton's dubbing bag is opened. "Certainly never an angler in Europe has his shop half so well-finished as you have."

Cotton replies with the touchiness of a true obsessive: "Let me tell you, here are some colours, contemptible as they seem here, that are very hard to be got; and scarce any one of them, which, if it should be lost, I should not miss and be concerned about the loss of it too, once in the year."

Cotton devotes a whole chapter to collection of flies for every month of the year. Few have modern analogues, but they are based on accurate observation, as with his stonefly:

His body is long and pretty thick, and as broad at the tail, almost, as at the middle; his colour is a very fine brown, ribbed with yellow and much yellower on the belly than on the back: he has two or three little whisks also at the tag of his tail, and two little horns upon his head: his wings, when full grown, are double, and flat down upon his back, of the same colour but rather darker than his body and longer than it...

On a calm day you shall see the still-deeps continually all over circles by the fishes rising, who will gorge themselves with these flies, will they purge again out of their gills.

In Montana, the fish still rise to stoneflies until the water is "continually all over circles", but in the UK it is an anachronism. Cotton's Derbyshire is more remote from modern England, and closer to the wilderness than Montana or Alaska are now. He is quite unashamed of bait fishing, whether with flies or with grubs. He kills fish until weary. "I have in this very river that runs by us, in three or four hours taken thirty, five and thirty, and forty of the best trouts in the river." And he concludes his advice with a note of earthy practicality not to be found as the sport becomes more refined: a recipe for fresh trout boiled with beer and horseradish.

In the gorge of the Dove he had a private garden "with a delicate clear river about it" where the world was reduced to its simplest essentials.

His masterpiece in translation, the Essays of M. de Montaigne (1685–1686, 1693, 1700, etc.), has often been reprinted, and still maintains its reputation; his other works include The Scarronides, or Virgil Travestie (1664–1670), a gross burlesque of the first and fourth books of the Aeneid, which ran through fifteen editions; Burlesque upon Burlesque, ... being some of Lucian's Dialogues newly put into English fustian (1675); The Moral Philosophy of the Stoicks (1667), from the French of Guillaume du Vair; The History of the Life of the Duke of Espernon (1670), from the French of Guillaume Girard; the Commentaries (1674) of Blaise de Montluc; the Planter's Manual (1675), a practical book on arboriculture, in which he was an expert; The Wonders of the Peake (1681); the Compleat Gamester and The Fair one of Tunis, both dated 1674, are also assigned to Cotton.

Here is Cotton's epitaph for "M.H.", a prostitute (spacing, spelling and capitalisation as originally printed):

Epitaph upon M.H

In this cold Monument lies one,
That I know who has lain upon,
The happier He : her Sight would charm,
And Touch have kept King David warm.
Lovely, as is the dawning East ,
Was this Marble's frozen Guest;
As soft, and Snowy, as that Down
Adorns the Blow-balls frizled Crown;
As straight and slender as the Crest,
Or Antlet of the one beam'd Beast;
Pleasant as th' odorous Month of May :
As glorious, and as light as Day .

Whom I admir'd, as soon as knew,
And now her Memory pursue
With such a superstitious Lust,
That I could fumble with her Dust.

She all Perfections had, and more,
Tempting, as if design'd a Whore ,
For so she was; and since there are
Such, I could wish them all as fair.

Pretty she was, and young, and wise,
And in her Calling so precise,
That Industry had made her prove
The sucking School-Mistress of Love :
And Death, ambitious to become
Her Pupil, left his Ghastly home,
And, seeing how we us'd her here,
The raw-bon'd Rascal ravisht her.

Who, pretty Soul, resign'd her Breath,
To seek new Letchery in Death.

== Legacy ==
William Oldys contributed a life of Cotton to Hawkins's edition (1760) of the Compleat Angler. His Lyrical Poems were edited by J. R. Tutin in 1903, from an original edition of 1689. Cotton's translation of Montaigne was edited in 1892, and in a more elaborate form in 1902, by W. C. Hazlitt, who omitted or relegated to the notes the passages in which Cotton interpolates his own matter, and supplied Cotton's omissions.

Benjamin Britten set Cotton's The Evening Quatrains to music in his Serenade for Tenor, Horn and Strings in 1943.

Andrew Millar, the prominent 18th century London bookseller, purchased a copyright share from John Osborne in a new, fifth, edition of Cotton's The Genuine Poetical Works. Thus, Cotton's poetry remained popular and profitable well into the eighteenth century, partly due to his clever "burlesques" of famous works from classical literature.

Charles Cotton was buried in St James's Church, Piccadilly. A memorial to him is also found within the church.

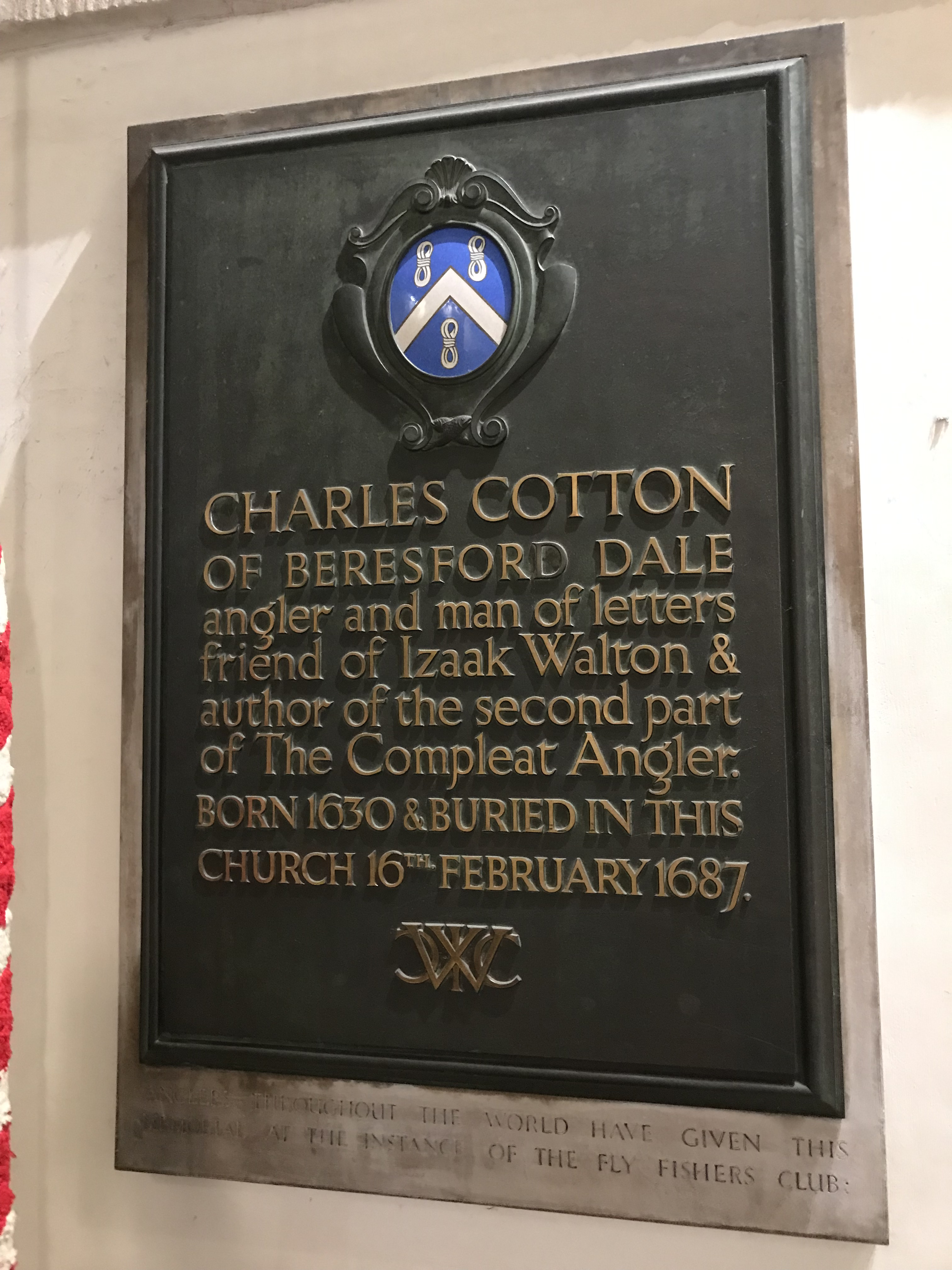
A memorial to Charles Cotton in St James's Church, Piccadilly

== Sources ==
- A Fly Fishing History
