= Jacquet =

Jacquet or Jaquet is a French name which in the Middle Age designated pilgrims on the Way of St. James (Saint-Jacques in French)

== Jacquet ==
=== Given name ===
- Jacquet of Mantua (1483–1559), French composer
- Jacquet de Berchem (1505–1567), Franco-Flemish composer

=== Surname ===
- Aimé Jacquet (born 1941), French footballer and coach
- Al Jacquet, American politician
- Alain Jacquet (1939–2008), French artist
- Claire Jacquet (born 1988), French canoeist
- Earthna Jacquet, American tennis player
- Ernest Jacquet (1886–1969), Swiss ice hockey player
- Farah Jacquet (born 1985), Belgian politician
- Fernand Jacquet (1888–1947), Belgian pilot
- Gaston Jacquet (1883–1970), French actor
- Henri Jacquet (1888–1971), Swiss fencer
- Hervé Jacquet (born 1939), French-American mathematician
- H. Maurice Jacquet (1886–1954), French composer
- Ib Jacquet (born 1956), Danish footballer
- Illinois Jacquet (1922–2004), American jazz saxophonist
- Jade Jacquet (born 2009), French racing driver
- Jeffrey Jacquet (born 1966), American actor
- Jennifer Jacquet, American professor
- Jérémy Jacquet (born 2005), French football player
- John Blockley Jacquet (1868–1942), English-born Australian Geological Surveyor and Chief Inspector of Mines
- Jonathan Jacquet (born 1984), Argentine footballer
- Justo Jacquet (born 1961), Paraguayan footballer
- Kyrian Jacquet (born 2001), French tennis player
- Lloyd Jacquet (1899–1970), American publisher
- Loïc Jacquet (born 1985), French rugby union footballer
- Luc Jacquet (born 1967), French film director
- Lucien Jacquet (1860–1914), French dermatologist
- Mardi Jacquet (born 1960), French-American model
- Michael Jacquet (born 1997), American football player
- Miguel Jacquet (born 1995), Paraguayan footballer
- Nate Jacquet (born 1975), American football player
- Olivier Jacquet (born 1969), Swiss fencer
- Pierre Armand Jacquet (1906–1967), French metallurgist and chemist
- Quentin Jacquet (born 1991), French motorcycle racer
- Robert Jacquet (1906–1970), French rower
- René-Jean Jacquet (1933–1993), French footballer
- Russell Jacquet (1917–1990), American trumpeter

== Jaquet ==
=== Surname ===
- Christophe Jaquet (born 1976), Swiss footballer
- Frank Jaquet (1885–1958), American actor
- Gérard Jaquet (1916–2013), French politician
- Gilles Jaquet (born 1974), Swiss snowboarder
- Joseph Jaquet (1822–1898), Belgian sculptor
- Sabrina Jaquet (born 1987), Swiss badminton player
- Sandrine Jaquet (born 1971), Swiss tennis player
- Wendy Jaquet (born 1943), American politician

== Jacquette ==
=== Given name ===
- Jacquette Ada (born 1991), Cameroonian footballer
- Jacquette Guillaume (1665–??), French writer
- Jacquette Löwenhielm (1797–1839), Swedish noble

=== Surname ===
- Dale Jacquette (1953–2016), American philosopher
- Julia Jacquette (born 1964), American artist
- Tommy Jacquette (1943–2009), American community activist
- Yvonne Jacquette (1934–2023), American painter and printmaker

== Other ==
- Jacquet (game), a board game related to Backgammon
