= Struer (disambiguation) =

Struer is a town in Denmark.

Struer may also refer to:

- Struer Municipality, a place in Denmark
- Struer (nomination district), Denmark
- Holger F. Struer (1846–1931), Danish chemist

== See also ==
- Struers
