= Cabinet Magazine =

American magazine

- Issue 8, fall 2002
- Frequency: Quarterly
- Founded: 2000
- Company: Immaterial Inc.
- Country: United States
- Based in: Brooklyn, New York
- Language: English
- Website: www.cabinetmagazine.org
- ISSN: 1531-1430
- OCLC: 44735602

Cabinet Magazine is a quarterly, Brooklyn, New York–based, non-profit art and culture magazine established in 2000. Cabinet Magazine also operates an event and exhibition space in Brooklyn. In 2022, Cabinet transitioned its magazine to be a digital publication, although it still publishes print books.

== Issue structure ==
Cabinet Magazine issues are divided into three sections.

=== Section 1: Columns ===
Each issue begins with four of the magazine's recurring columns. Some columns have (or have had) recurring writers. Some columns appear more frequently than others:

- "The Clean Room" is David Serlin's column on science and technology. (First appearance: issue 1.)
- "Colors", which appears in every issue, presents a writer or artist's response to a specific color assigned by the editors. (First appearance: issue 1.)
- "Ingestion", a column originated by Allen S. Weiss, explores food within a framework informed by aesthetics, history, and philosophy. (First appearance: issue 1.)
- "Leftovers" examines the cultural significance of detritus. (First appearance: issue 1.)
- "Thing" invites writers in various fields to take a shot at identifying a single found object not recognizable to the magazine's editors. (First appearance: issue 12.)
- "Inventory" is an occasional column that features and sometimes examines a list, catalogue, or register. (First appearance: issue 13.)
- "Black Pyramid" is Peter Lamborn Wilson's column on the poetics of esoterica. (First appearance: issue 18.)
- "Object Lesson", a column by Celeste Olalquiaga, "reads culture against the grain to identify striking illustrations of historical process or principle." (First appearance: issue 20.)
- "A Minor History of," a column by Joshua Foer, examines an overlooked cultural phenomenon using a timeline. (First appearance: issue 25.)

=== Section 2: Main ===
The Main section features miscellaneous essays, interviews, and artist projects.

=== Section 3: Theme ===
The third section features essays, interviews, and artist projects related to a specific theme. For example, the summer 2012 issue theme was "punishment" and featured a column on capital punishment by philosopher Justin E. H. Smith, an interview with Danielle S. Allen talking about punishment and the construction of authority, and a themed artist project by photographer Carl De Keyzer.

A theme-based CD is included in issues 1, 3, 5, 7, 9, 11, and 13.

== Magazine and book ==
Though Cabinet Magazine is distributed to newsstands as a magazine (with ISSN), individual issues are also distributed as books, with ISBN numbers. Each issue is printed in two editions: one with a magazine barcode on the front cover and the other with a book barcode on the back cover.

== Logo ==
The logo was designed by Richard Massey, and is derived from the fragmented elements and ligatures of an early twentieth century stencil often used in Le Corbusier's architectural drawings and manifestos.

== Other projects ==
In addition to publishing the quarterly, Cabinet Magazine also publishes books, curates art-related exhibitions, and stages conferences and live events. In October 2008, the magazine opened a public venue at 300 Nevins Street in Brooklyn, where it operates an exhibition area, reading lounge and a 64-seat screening room and lecture space.

=== Books ===
- The Book of Stamps, a book of 15 artist-designed stamps by Walead Beshty, Melissa Brown, Melissa Dubbin & Aaron S. Davidson, Spencer Finch, Carl Michael von Hausswolff & Leif Elggren, Jonathan Herder, Mikhail Iliatov, Emily Jacir, Julia Jacquette, Vandana Jain, Sandra Eula Lee, Line Up, Frank Magnotta, Michael Oatman and David Shrigley. With text by George Pendle. (Cabinet Books, 2008)
The Book of Stamps (Cabinet Books, 2008)

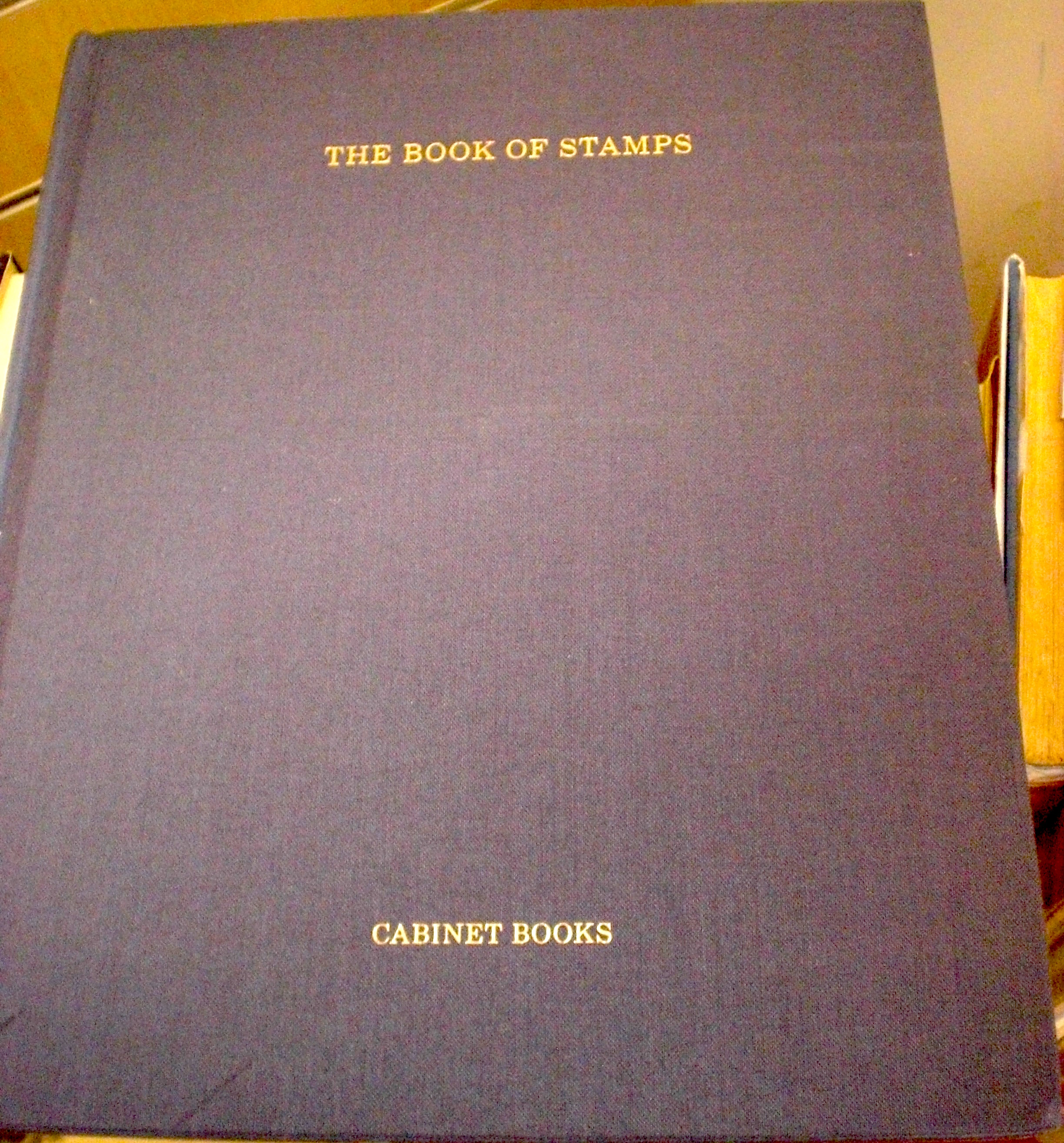
Cover

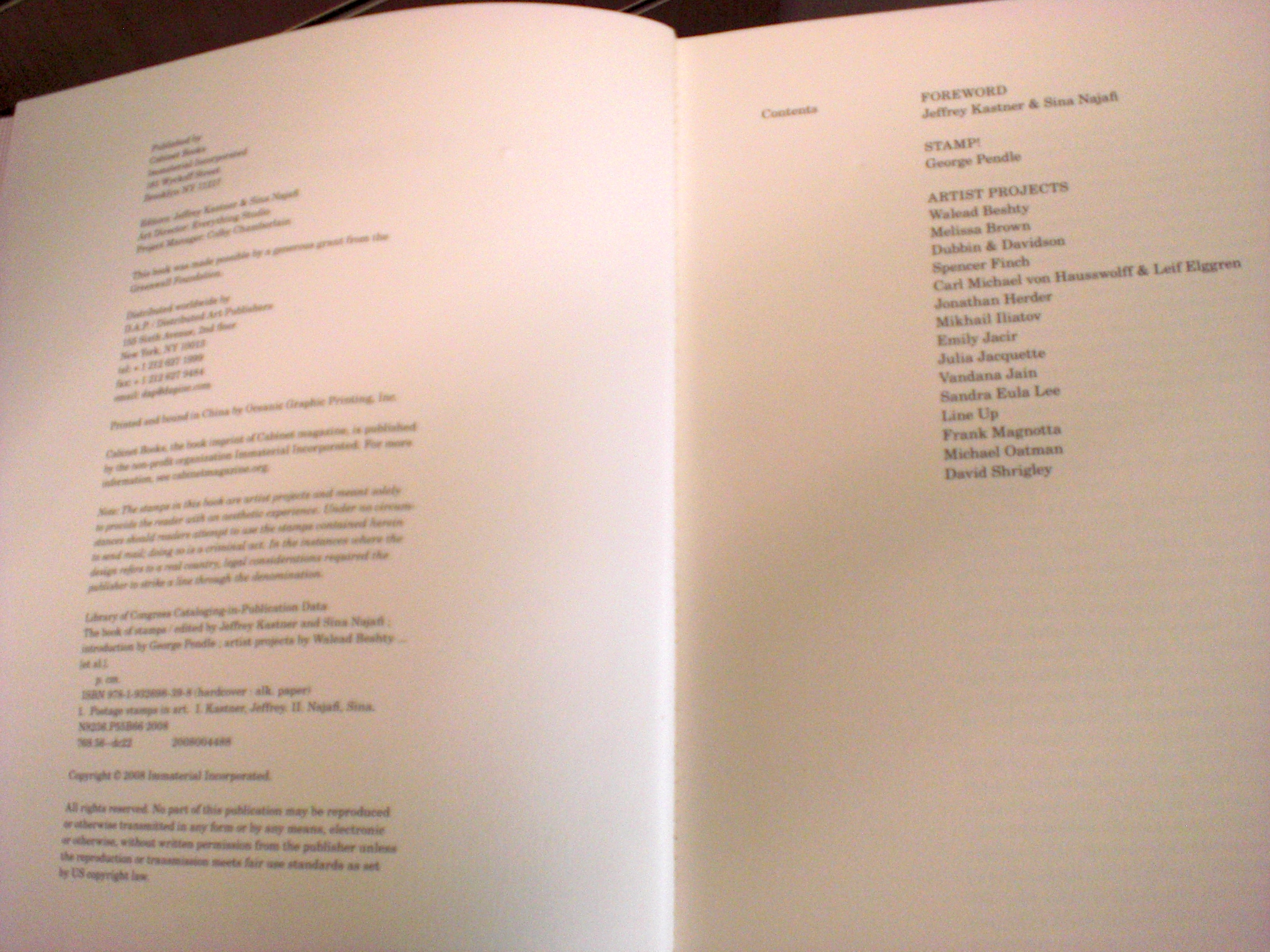
Edition notice
- Ilf & Petrov's American Road Trip: The 1935 Travelogue of Two Soviet Writers, by Yevgeni Petrov and Ilya Ilf, edited by Erika Wolf, translated by Anne O. Fisher (Cabinet Books and Princeton Architectural Press, 2006) ISBN 1-56898-600-9
- Letters From Mayhem, by Roger Andersson, with poems by Albert Mobilio (Cabinet Books, 2004) ISBN 1-932698-25-6
- Odd Lots: Revisiting Gordon Matta-Clark's Fake Estates (Cabinet Books, The Queens Museum of Art, White Columns), ISBN 1-932698-26-4
- The Paper Sculpture Book (Cabinet Books, Independent Curators International, and SculptureCenter, 2003) ISBN 0-916365-69-7
- Presidential Doodles: Two Centuries of Scribbles, Scratches, Squiggles & Scrawls from the Oval Office, by The Editors of Cabinet Magazine, with accompanying captions by David Greenberg, and introductions by Paul Collins and David Greenberg (Basic Books, 2006) ISBN 0-465-03266-4

=== Exhibitions ===
- Cabinet's 2005 exhibition "Odd Lots: Revisiting Gordon Matta-Clark's Fake Estates," at The Queens Museum of Art and at the White Columns gallery was chosen by The New York Times's Michael Kimmelman as one of the ten best shows of the year.
- In 2003, Cabinet co-produced "The Paper Sculpture Show," a traveling exhibition of 29 paper sculptures, each one devised by a different artist. The sculptures themselves are collected as tear-out, do-it-yourself projects in The Paper Sculpture Book.

=== Conferences and events ===
- In 2006, Cabinet presented Iron Artist, a live artist-versus-artist competition modeled after Iron Chef, at P.S. 1 Contemporary Art Center in Queens, New York.
- In March 2010, Cabinet presented Not Knots, a workshop on "knots, knitting, and string figures" at the magazine's art space in Brooklyn, where LAS Magazine said "actual experts, not just some Bryn Mawr dropouts that the manager of Yarn Tree met outside of an Animal Collective show" would guide aspiring craft makers through "a hands-on exploration of knots, knitting, and string figures" that sounded somewhat mesmerizing.
