= Perrinjaquet =

Perrinjaquet is a surname. Notable people with the surname include:

- Roger Perrinjaquet (1935–2000), Swiss inventor
- Sylvie Perrinjaquet (born 1955), Swiss politician

== See also ==
- Perrin (disambiguation)
- Jaquet
- Jacques Perrin
