= Olalquiaga =

Olalquiaga is a Spanish surname. Notable people with the surname include:

- Celeste Olalquiaga (born 1967), Venezuelan-born independent scholar
- Francisco Javier García-Larrache Olalquiaga (born 1965), Spanish diplomat
- Ramón Olalquiaga (1898–1990), Spanish footballer
