= Struers =

Danish engineering company

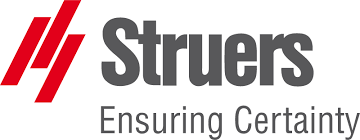
- Type: Engineering company
- Industry: Aerospace, automotive, manufacturing, Electronics industries
- Key people: Steen Jensen (President, CEO)
- Owner: Indicor
- Number of employees: 630 (2021)
- Subsidiaries: Struers Japan Struers China Ltd. Struers France S.A.S Struers GmbH Struers Ltd. Struers Inc.
- Website: https://www.struers.com

Struers is a Danish engineering company, providing equipment for metallography preparation and inspection. Holger F. Struer, a Danish chemist, founded Struers in 1875 in Copenhagen. Struers introduced Micropol, a new process for electrolytic polishing.^{[1]}

Struers provide cutting, mounting, grinding, polishing, microevaluation, hardness testing equipment and consumables for the analysis of metal samples. Government departments, universities, NASA and the International Metallographic Society use Struers equipment in the analysis metal or material samples.

Today, Struers is a global organization with offices in 24 countries and a presence in more than 60 countries, specializing in equipment, consumables, and application expertise for the preparation (mounting, grinding, and polishing, as well as hardness testing) and analysis of material samples.

Struers is owned by Roper Technologies, a US-based diversified technology company with annual revenues of $5.4 billion.
