= Metallography =

Study of metals using microscopy

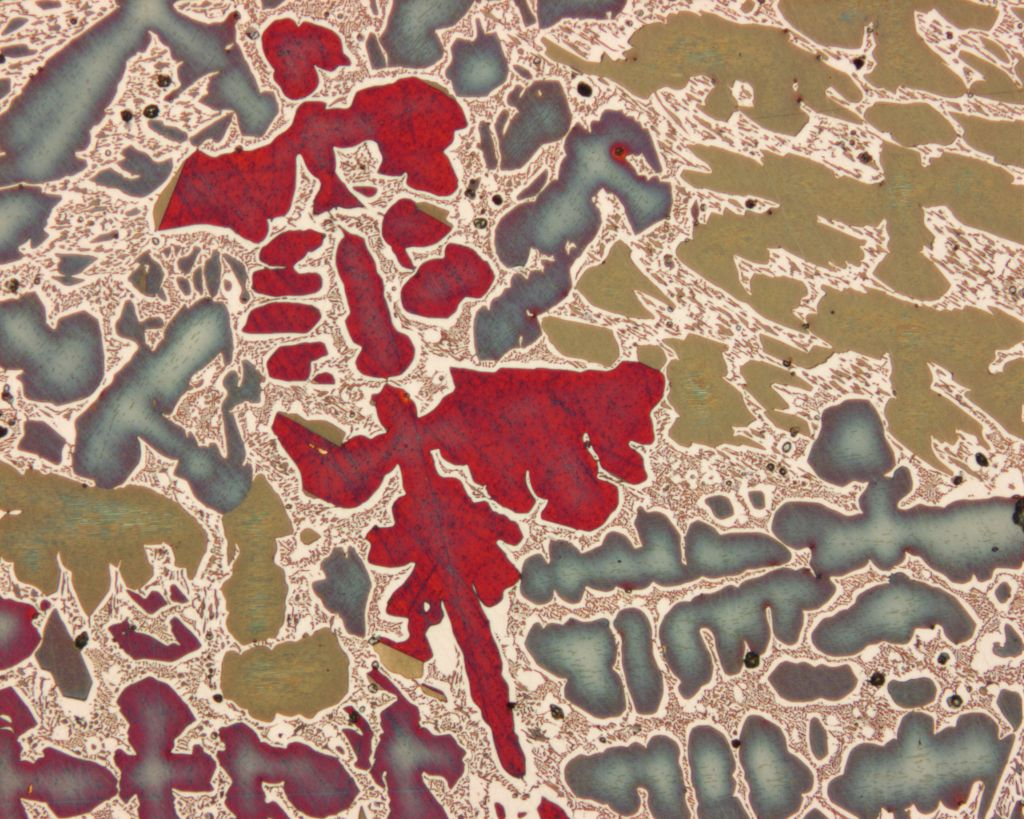
A micrograph of bronze revealing a cast dendritic structure

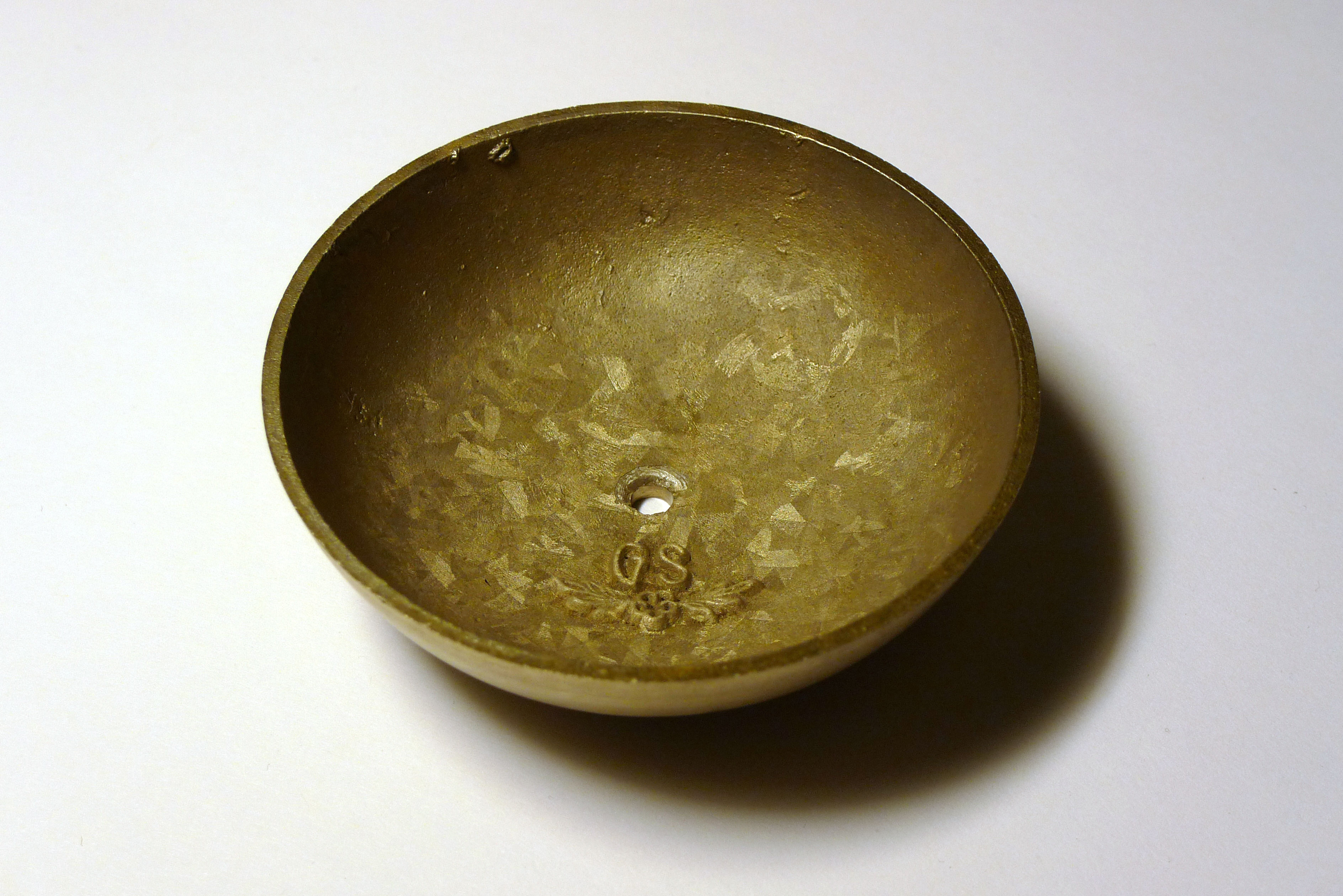
In some cases, the metallographic structure is large enough to be seen with the unaided eye

Metallography is the study of the physical structure and components of metals, by using microscopy.

Ceramic and polymeric materials may also be prepared using metallographic techniques, hence the terms ceramography, plastography and, collectively, materialography.

== Preparing metallographic specimens ==
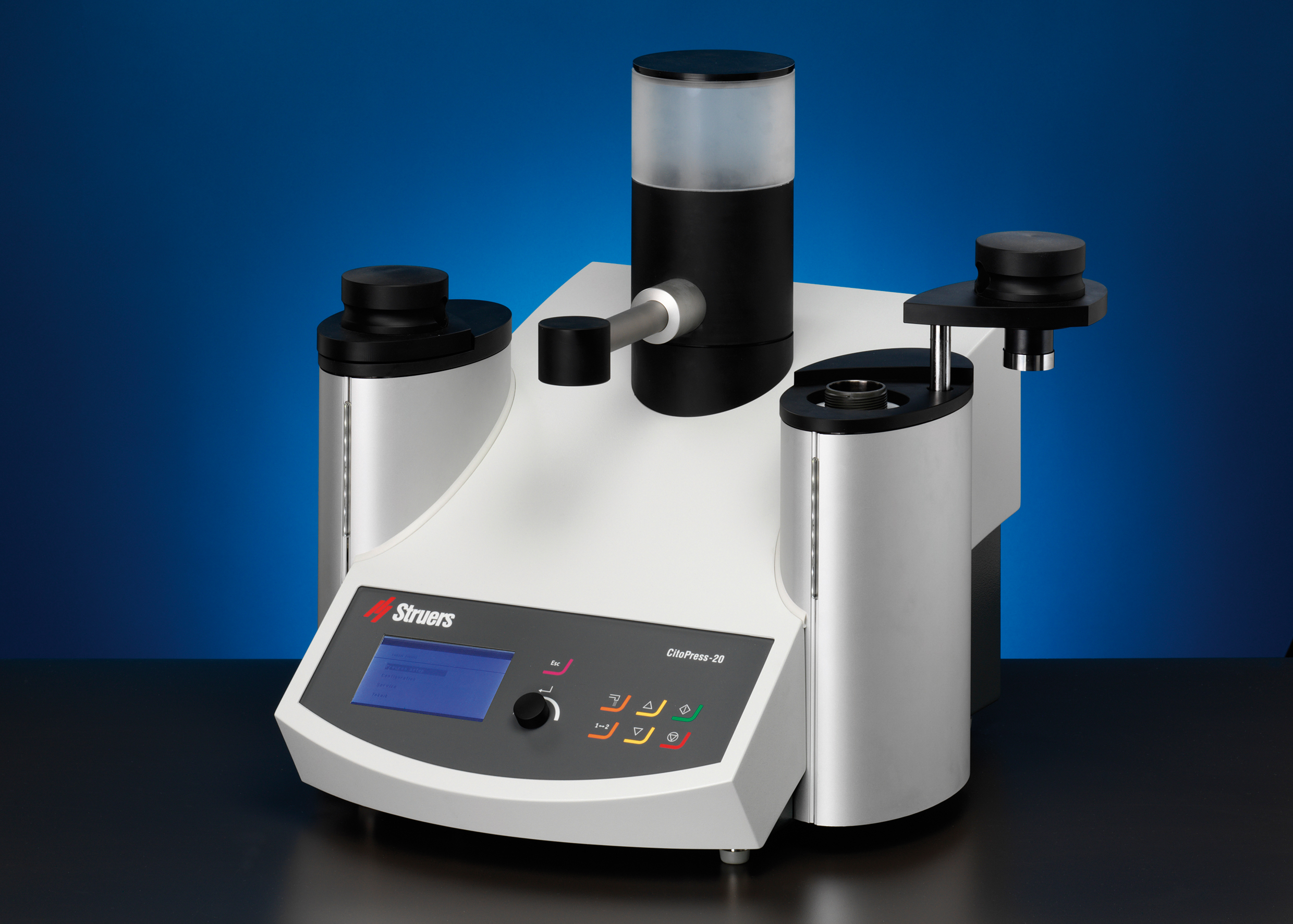
Hot mounting: The specimens are placed in the mounting press, and the resin is added. The specimens are mounted under heat and high pressure.

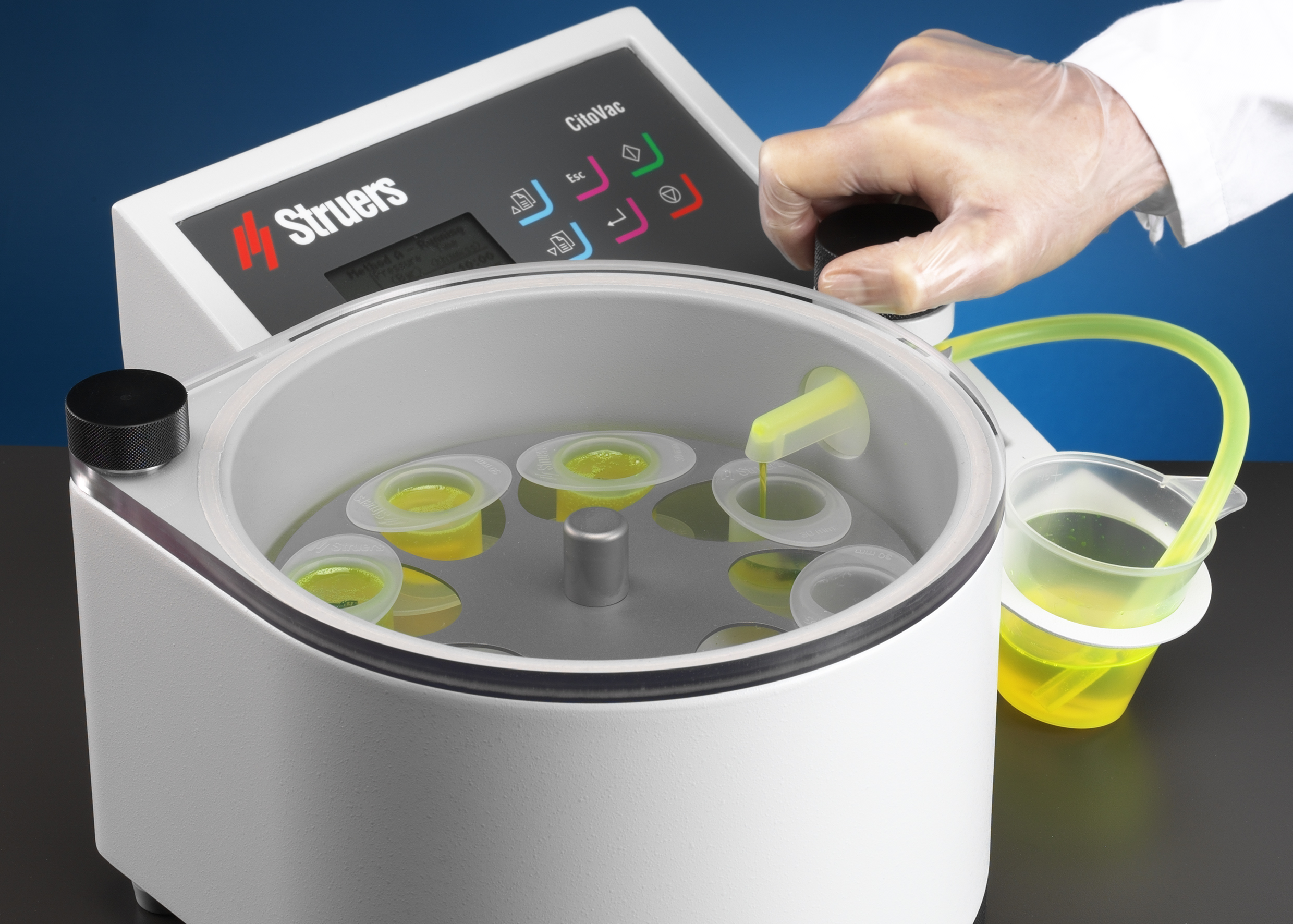
Cold mounting: The specimens are placed in a mounting cup and mounting material is then poured over the specimens. A vacuum impregnation unit (photo) is used for mounting of porous materials.

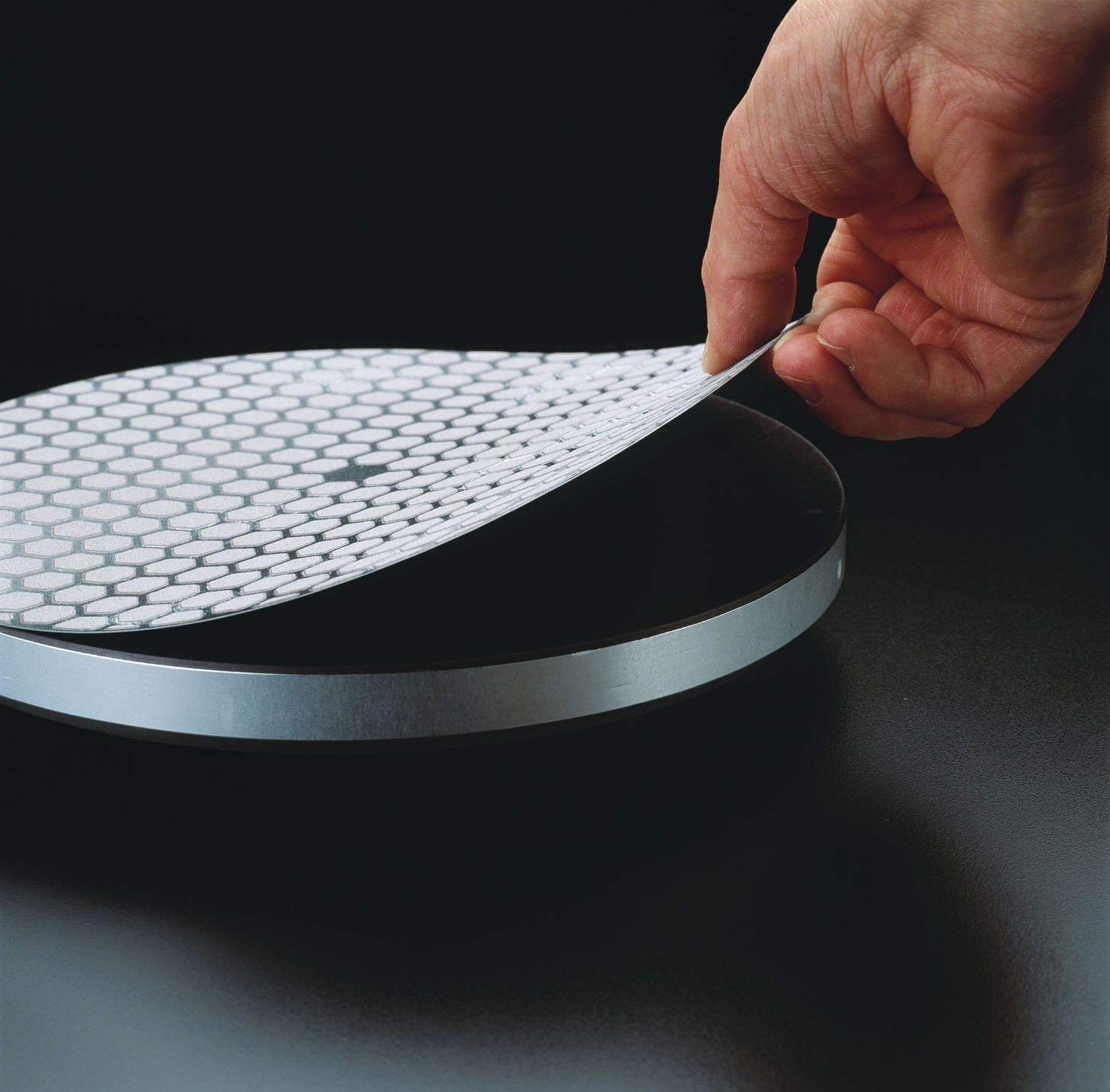
Example of a reusable pad for use with diamond suspension. A single magnetic platen is positioned on the grinding and polishing machine to support the preparation pads.

The surface of a metallographic specimen is prepared by various methods of grinding, polishing, and etching. After preparation, it is often analyzed using optical or electron microscopy. Using only metallographic techniques, a skilled technician can identify alloys and predict material properties.

Mechanical preparation is the most common preparation method. Successively finer abrasive particles are used to remove material from the sample surface until the desired surface quality is achieved. Many different machines are available for doing this grinding and polishing, which are able to meet different demands for quality, capacity, and reproducibility.

A systematic preparation method is the easiest way to achieve the true structure. Sample preparation must therefore pursue rules which are suitable for most materials. Different materials with similar properties (hardness and ductility) will respond alike and thus require the same consumables during preparation.

Metallographic specimens are typically "mounted" using a hot compression thermosetting resin. In the past, phenolic thermosetting resins have been used, but modern epoxy is becoming more popular because reduced shrinkage during curing results in a better mount with superior edge retention. A typical mounting cycle will compress the specimen and mounting media to 4,000 psi (28 MPa) and heat to a temperature of 350 °F (177 °C). When specimens are very sensitive to temperature, "cold mounts" may be made with a two-part epoxy resin. Mounting a specimen provides a safe, standardized, and ergonomic way by which to hold a sample during the grinding and polishing operations.

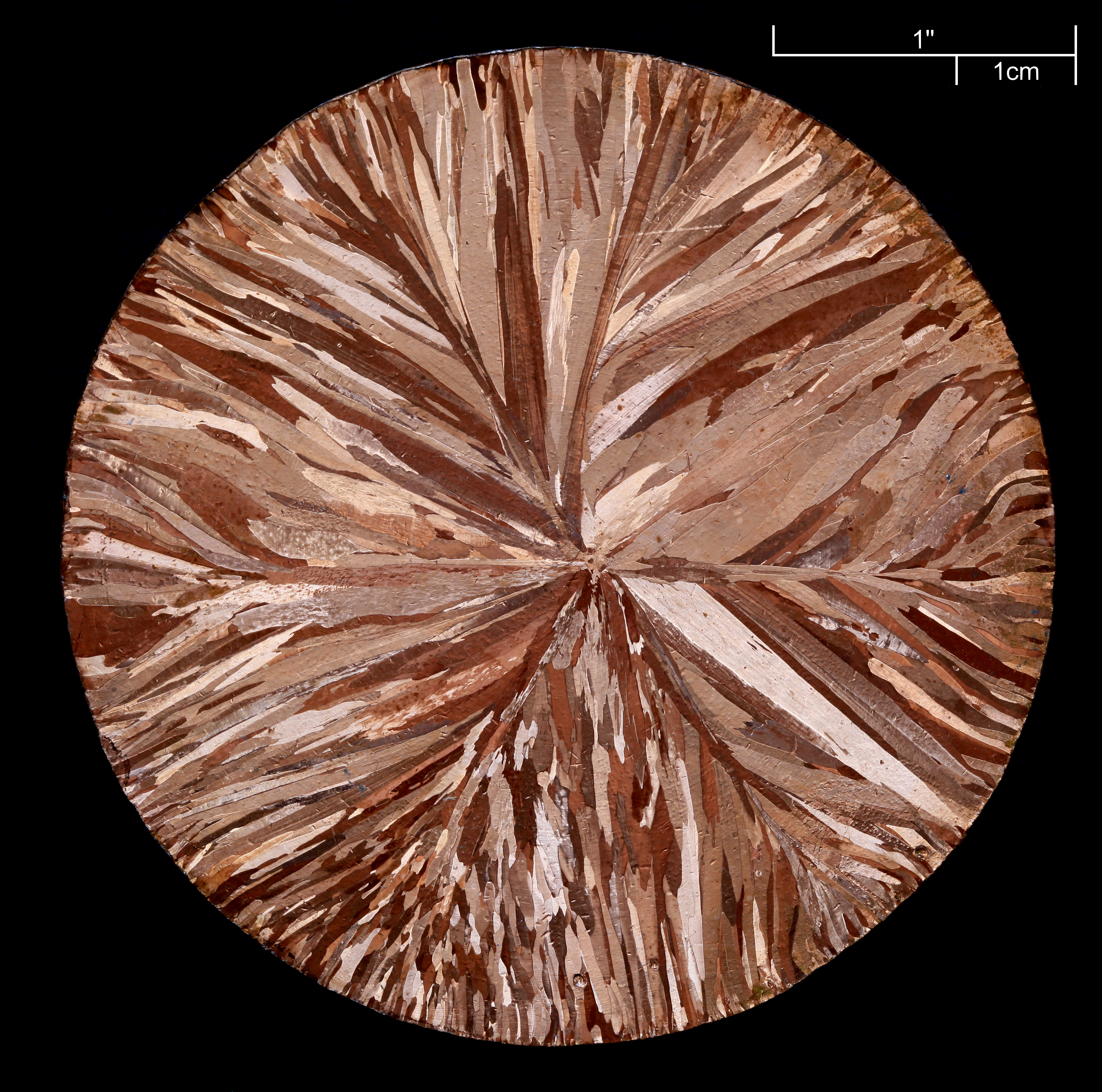
A macro etched copper disc

After mounting, the specimen is wet ground to reveal the surface of the metal. The specimen is successively ground with finer and finer abrasive media. Silicon carbide abrasive paper was the first method of grinding and is still used today. Many metallographers, however, prefer to use a diamond grit suspension which is dosed onto a reusable fabric pad throughout the polishing process. Diamond grit in suspension might start at 9 micrometres and finish at one micrometre. Generally, polishing with diamond suspension gives finer results than using silicon carbide papers (SiC papers), especially with revealing porosity, which silicon carbide paper sometimes "smear" over. After grinding the specimen, polishing is performed. Typically, a specimen is polished with a slurry of alumina, silica, or diamond on a napless cloth to produce a scratch-free mirror finish, free from smear, drag, or pull-outs and with minimal deformation remaining from the preparation process.

After polishing, certain microstructural constituents can be seen with the microscope, e.g., inclusions and nitrides. If the crystal structure is non-cubic (e.g., a metal with a hexagonal-closed packed crystal structure, such as Ti or Zr) the microstructure can be revealed without etching using crossed polarized light (light microscopy). Otherwise, the microstructural constituents of the specimen are revealed by using a suitable chemical or electrolytic etchant.

Non-destructive surface analysis techniques can involve applying a thin film or varnish that can be peeled off after drying and examined under a microscope. The technique was developed by Pierre Armand Jacquet and others in 1957.

== Analysis techniques ==
Many different microscopy techniques are used in metallographic analysis.

Prepared specimens should be examined with the unaided eye after etching to detect any visible areas that have responded to the etchant differently from the norm as a guide to where microscopical examination should be employed. Light optical microscopy (LOM) examination should always be performed prior to any electron metallographic (EM) technique, as these are more time-consuming to perform and the instruments are much more expensive.

Further, certain features can be best observed with the LOM, e.g., the natural color of a constituent can be seen with the LOM but not with EM systems. Also, image contrast of microstructures at relatively low magnifications, e.g., <500X, is far better with the LOM than with the scanning electron microscope (SEM), while transmission electron microscopes (TEM) generally cannot be utilized at magnifications below about 2000 to 3000X. LOM examination is fast and can cover a large area. Thus, the analysis can determine if the more expensive, more time-consuming examination techniques using the SEM or the TEM are required and where on the specimen the work should be concentrated.

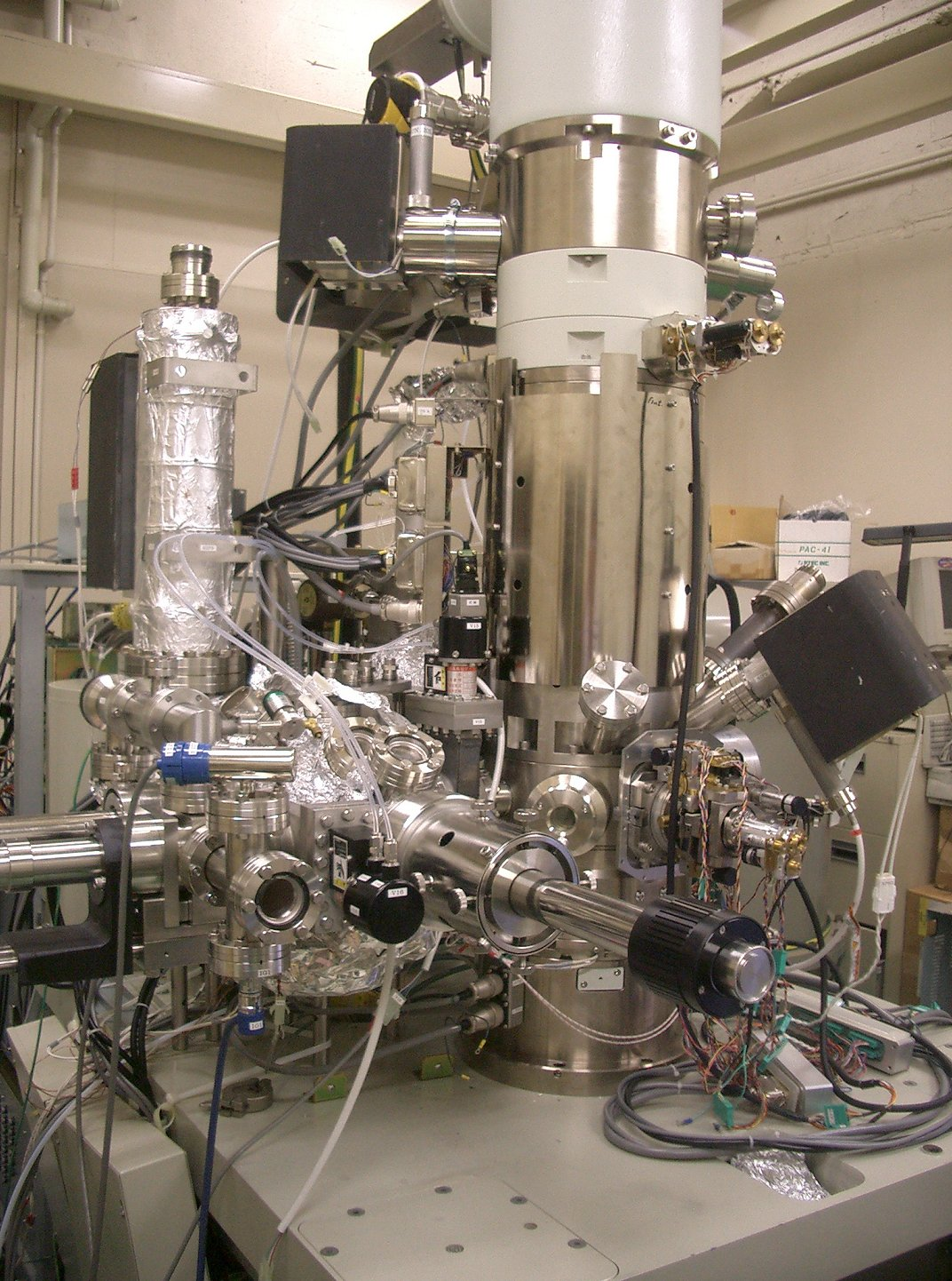
Scanning transmission electron microscope, used in metallography

=== Design, resolution, and image contrast ===
Light microscopes are designed for placement of the specimen's polished surface on the specimen stage either upright or inverted. Each type has advantages and disadvantages. Most LOM work is done at magnifications between 50 and 1000X. However, with a good microscope, it is possible to perform examination at higher magnifications, e.g., 2000X, and even higher, as long as diffraction fringes are not present to distort the image. However, the resolution limit of the LOM will not be better than about 0.2 to 0.3 micrometers. Special methods are used at magnifications below 50X, which can be very helpful when examining the microstructure of cast specimens where greater spatial coverage in the field of view may be required to observe features such as dendrites.

Besides considering the resolution of the optics, one must also maximize visibility by maximizing image contrast. A microscope with excellent resolution may not be able to image a structure, that is there is no visibility, if image contrast is poor. Image contrast depends upon the quality of the optics, coatings on the lenses, and reduction of flare and glare; but, it also requires proper specimen preparation and good etching techniques. So, obtaining good images requires maximum resolution and image contrast.

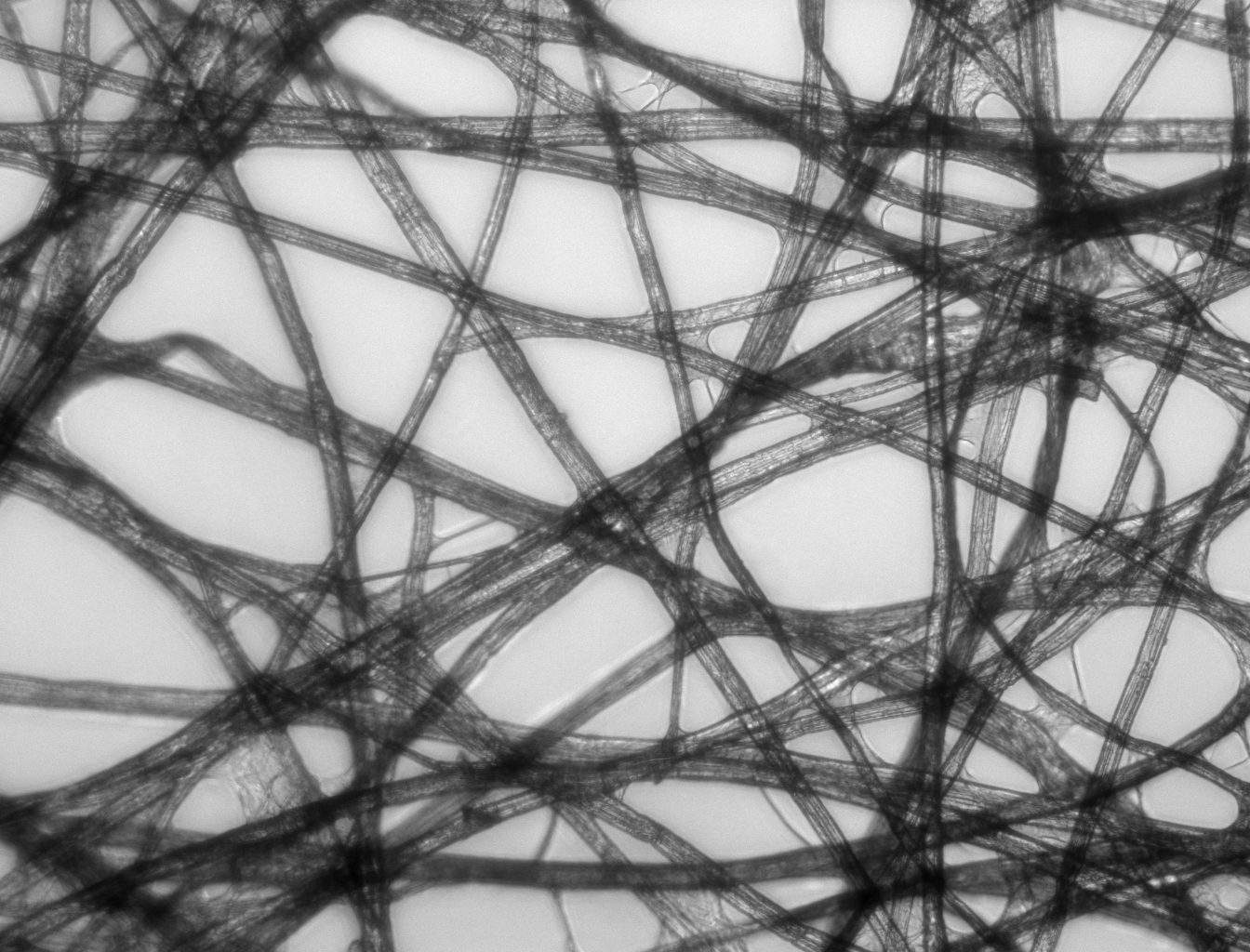
Bright-field illumination, where sample contrast comes from absorbance of light in the sample

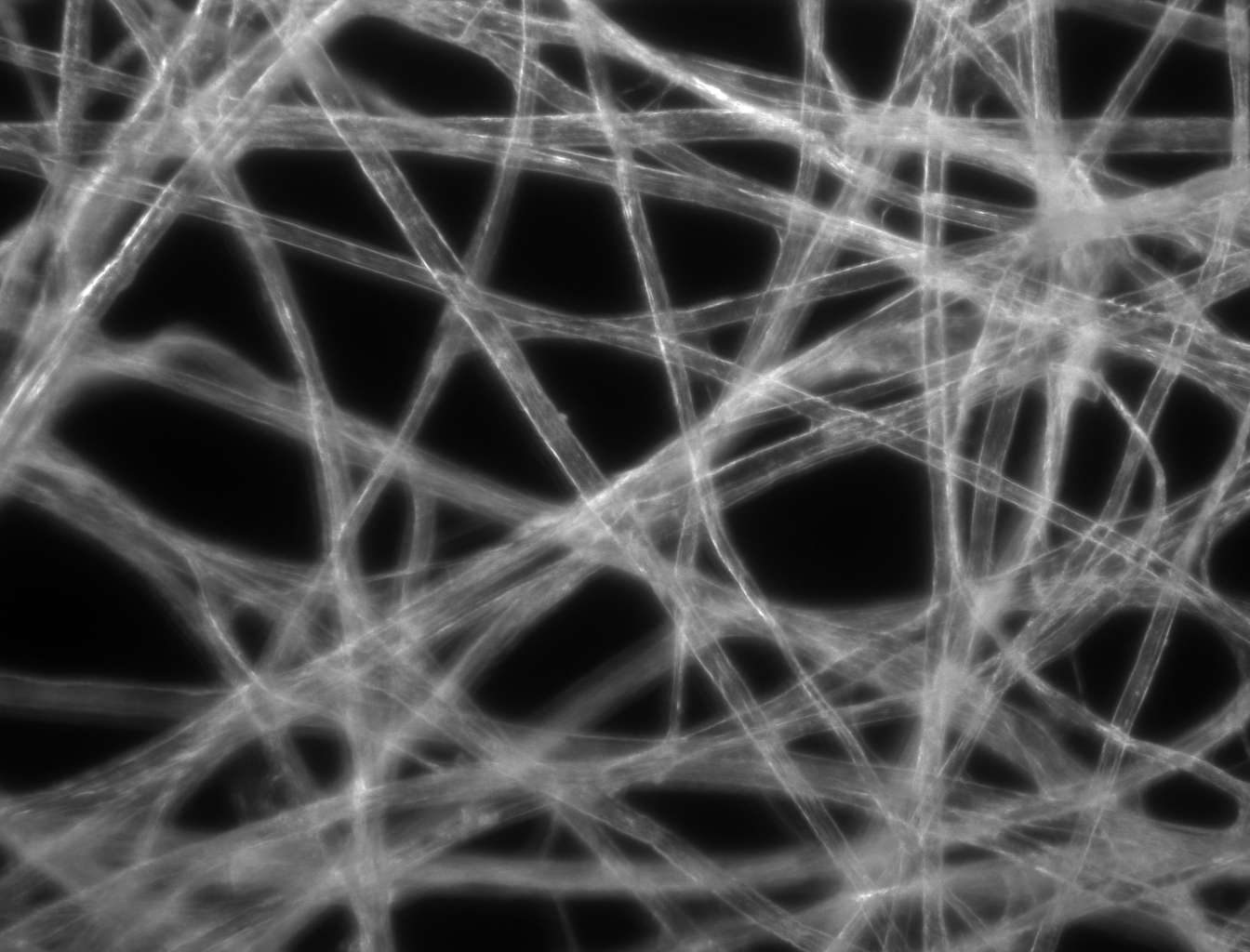
Dark-field illumination, sample contrast comes from light scattered by the sample

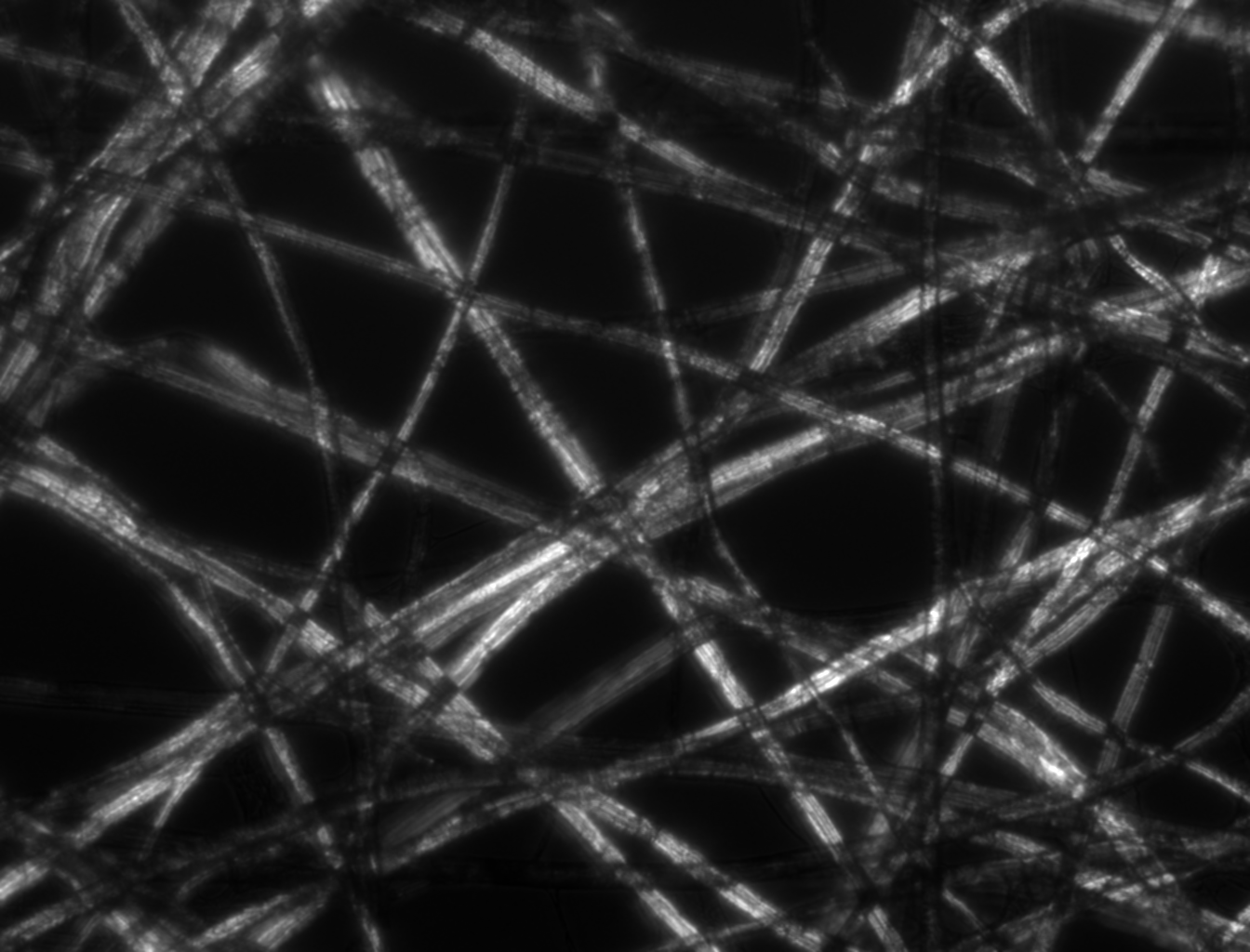
Cross-polarized light illumination, where sample contrast comes from rotation of polarized light through the sample

=== Bright- and dark-field microscopy ===
Most LOM observations are conducted using bright-field (BF) illumination, where the image of any flat feature perpendicular to the incident light path is bright, or appears to be white. But, other illumination methods can be used and, in some cases, may provide superior images with greater detail. Dark-field microscopy (DF), is an alternative method of observation that provides high-contrast images and actually greater resolution than bright-field. In dark-field illumination, the light from features perpendicular to the optical axis is blocked and appears dark while the light from features inclined to the surface, which look dark in BF, appear bright, or "self-luminous" in DF. Grain boundaries, for example, are more vivid in DF than BF.

=== Polarized light microscopy ===
Polarized light (PL) is very useful when studying the structure of metals with non-cubic crystal structures (mainly metals with hexagonal close-packed (hcp) crystal structures). If the specimen is prepared with minimal damage to the surface, the structure can be seen vividly in cross-polarized light (the optic axis of the polarizer and analyzer are 90 degrees to each other, i.e., crossed). In some cases, an hcp metal can be chemically etched and then examined more effectively with PL. Tint etched surfaces, where a thin film (such as a sulfide, molybdate, chromate or elemental selenium film) is grown epitaxially on the surface to a depth where interference effects are created when examined with BF producing color images, can be improved with PL. If it is difficult to get a good interference film with good coloration, the colors can be improved by examination in PL using a sensitive tint (ST) filter.

=== Differential interference contrast microscopy ===
Another useful imaging mode is differential interference contrast (DIC), which is usually obtained with a system designed by the Polish physicist Georges Nomarski. This system gives the best detail. DIC converts minor height differences on the plane-of-polish, invisible in BF, into visible detail. The detail in some cases can be quite striking and very useful. If an ST filter is used along with a Wollaston prism, color is introduced. The colors are controlled by the adjustment of the Wollaston prism, and have no specific physical meaning, per se. But, visibility may be better.

=== Oblique illumination ===
DIC has largely replaced the older oblique illumination (OI) technique, which was available on reflected light microscopes prior to about 1975. In OI, the vertical illuminator is offset from perpendicular, producing shading effects that reveal height differences. This procedure reduces resolution and yields uneven illumination across the field of view. Nevertheless, OI was useful when people needed to know if a second phase particle was standing above or was recessed below the plane-of-polish, and is still available on a few microscopes. OI can be created on any microscope by placing a piece of paper under one corner of the mount so that the plane-of-polish is no longer perpendicular to the optical axis.

=== SRAS microscopy ===
Spatially resolve acoustic spectroscopy (SRAS) is an optical technique that uses optically generated high frequency surface acoustic waves to probe the direction elastic parameters of the surface and, as such, it can vividly reveal the surface microstructure of metals. It can also image the crystallographic orientation and determine the single crystal elasticity matrix of the material.

=== Scanning electron and transmission electron microscopes ===
If a specimen must be observed at higher magnification, it can be examined with a scanning electron microscope (SEM), or a transmission electron microscope (TEM). When equipped with an energy dispersive spectrometer (EDS), the chemical composition of the microstructural features can be determined. The ability to detect low-atomic number elements, such as carbon, oxygen, and nitrogen, depends upon the nature of the detector used. But, quantification of these elements by EDS is difficult and their minimum detectable limits are higher than when a wavelength-dispersive spectrometer (WDS) is used. But quantification of composition by EDS has improved greatly over time. The WDS system has historically had better sensitivity (ability to detect low amounts of an element) and ability to detect low-atomic weight elements, as well as better quantification of compositions, compared to EDS, but it was slower to use. Again, in recent years, the speed required to perform WDS analysis has improved substantially. Historically, EDS was used with the SEM while WDS was used with the electron microprobe analyzer (EMPA). Today, EDS and WDS is used with both the SEM and the EMPA. However, a dedicated EMPA is not as common as an SEM.

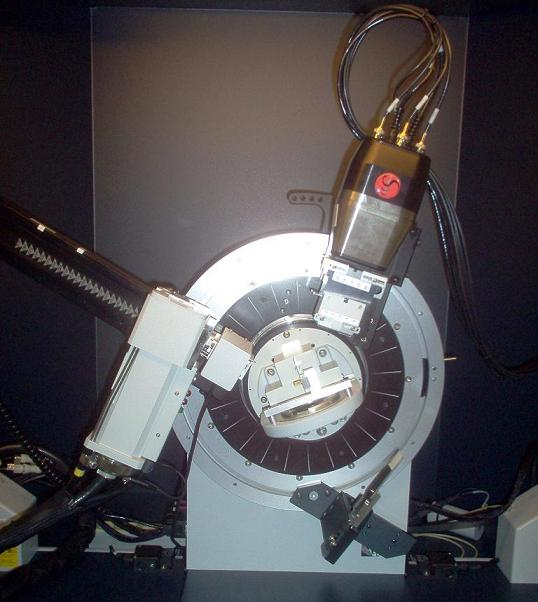
An x-ray diffractometer

=== X-ray diffraction techniques ===
Characterization of microstructures has also been performed using x-ray diffraction (XRD) techniques for many years. XRD can be used to determine the percentages of various phases present in a specimen if they have different crystal structures. For example, the amount of retained austenite in a hardened steel is best measured using XRD (ASTM E 975). If a particular phase can be chemically extracted from a bulk specimen, it can be identified using XRD based on the crystal structure and lattice dimensions. This work can be complemented by EDS and/or WDS analysis where the chemical composition is quantified. But EDS and WDS are difficult to apply to particles less than 2-3 micrometers in diameter. For smaller particles, diffraction techniques can be performed using the TEM for identification and EDS can be performed on small particles if they are extracted from the matrix using replication methods to avoid detection of the matrix along with the precipitate.

== Quantitative metallography ==
A number of techniques exist to quantitatively analyze metallographic specimens. These techniques are valuable in the research and production of all metals and alloys and non-metallic or composite materials.

Microstructural quantification is performed on a prepared, two-dimensional plane through the three-dimensional part or component. Measurements may involve simple metrology techniques, e.g., the measurement of the thickness of a surface coating, or the apparent diameter of a discrete second-phase particle, (for example, spheroidal graphite in ductile iron). Measurement may also require application of stereology to assess matrix and second-phase structures. Stereology is the field of taking 0-, 1- or 2-dimensional measurements on the two-dimensional sectioning plane and estimating the amount, size, shape or distribution of the microstructure in three dimensions. These measurements may be made using manual procedures with the aid of templates overlaying the microstructure, or with automated image analyzers. In all cases, adequate sampling must be made to obtain a proper statistical basis for the measurement. Efforts to eliminate bias are required.

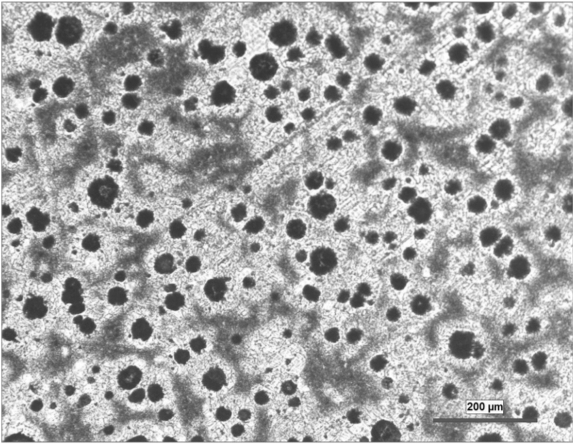
An image of the microstructures of ductile cast iron

Some of the most basic measurements include determination of the volume fraction of a phase or constituent, measurement of the grain size in polycrystalline metals and alloys, measurement of the size and size distribution of particles, assessment of the shape of particles, and spacing between particles.

Standards organizations, including ASTM International's Committee E-4 on Metallography and some other national and international organizations, have developed standard test methods describing how to characterize microstructures quantitatively.

For example, the amount of a phase or constituent, that is, its volume fraction, is defined in ASTM E 562; manual grain size measurements are described in ASTM E 112 (equiaxed grain structures with a single size distribution) and E 1182 (specimens with a bi-modal grain size distribution); while ASTM E 1382 describes how any grain size type or condition can be measured using image analysis methods. Characterization of nonmetallic inclusions using standard charts is described in ASTM E 45 (historically, E 45 covered only manual chart methods and an image analysis method for making such chart measurements was described in ASTM E 1122. The image analysis methods are currently being incorporated into E 45). A stereological method for characterizing discrete second-phase particles, such as nonmetallic inclusions, carbides, graphite, etc., is presented in ASTM E 1245.

== See also ==
- Henry Clifton Sorby
- Holger F. Struer
