= Pierre Armand Jacquet =

French chemical engineer and metallurgist

Pierre Armand Jacquet (7 April 1906 – 6 September 1967) was a French chemical engineer and metallurgist. He contributed to electrolytic polishing techniques to produce very smooth metal coatings and also to non-destructive approaches for surface metallographic analysis.

Jacquet was born in St. Mande and became a chemical engineer in 1926 after studies at the École Normale Supérieure de Chimie in Paris under Charles Marie. He received a doctorate in 1938 and worked at the Société de Matériel Téléphonique in Paris. He later worked in the lab of Frédéric Joliot-Curie and during World War II for the navy. In 1929 he discovered, by reversing polarity, a method to produce smooth metal surfaces with electrolytic polishing that he continued to improve upon for multiple metals until 1940. He also studied surface metallurgy and along with E. Mencarelli and A. van Effenterre, developed a non-destructive approach to examining metal surface by applying and peeling of a nitrocellulose varnish which could then be examined under a microscope.

Jacquet also served in advisory roles in French aeronautical research and for the atomic energy agency. He retired in 1966 and settled in Banyuls. He died in a sailing accident in Spain. The International Metallographic Society established a Jacquet memorial award for photo-metallography in 1968. The American Society for Metals began another award in 1946 which came to be called the Francis F. Lucas Metallographic Award from 1958. In 1972 the two awards got merged as the Jacquet-Lucas Award.
