= Earthna Jacquet =

American tennis player

Earthna Jacquet is a former professional tennis player in the United States. In 1955, he was the national Negro Singles Champion. He was from Los Angeles.

== Personal life ==
After his retirement from tennis at age 29, he worked at a truck driver and a tennis coach.
