= Celeste Olalquiaga =

Venezuelan-born independent scholar

Celeste Olalquiaga is a Venezuelan-born independent scholar. She is the author of The Artificial Kingdom: A Treasury of the Kitsch Experience (1999) and Megalopolis: Contemporary Cultural Sensibilities. She received a grant from the Rockefeller Foundation in 1994 and a Guggenheim Fellowship in 1996. She writes the column "Object Lesson" for the publication Cabinet.
