= Holger F. Struer =

Danish chemist (1846–1931)

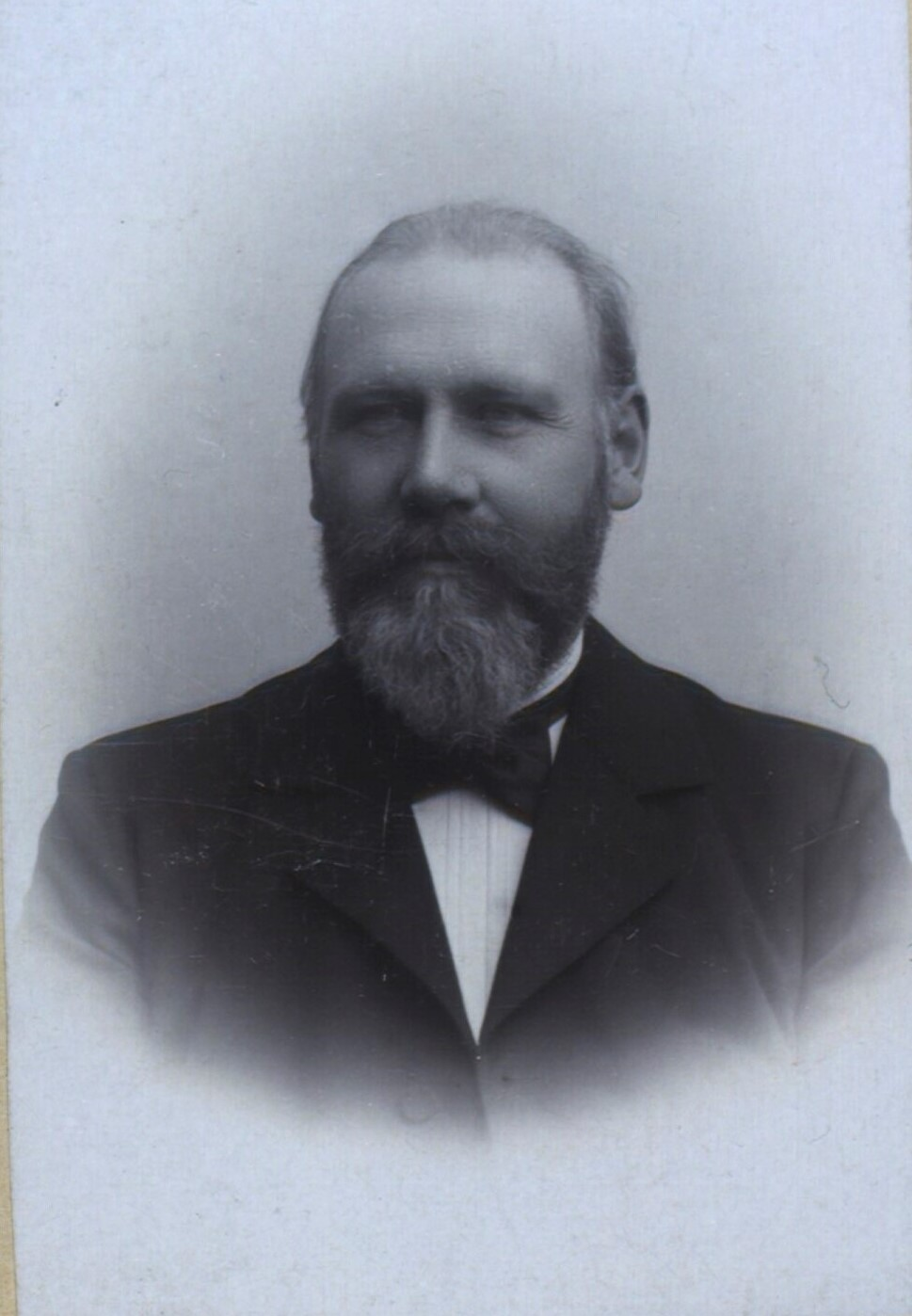
Holger Struer, 1905.

Holger F. Struer (22 March 1846 – 17 June 1931) was a Danish chemist and founder of "H. Struers Chemiske Laboratorium" (In Danish: "Struers Kemiske Laboratorium") in 1875 at Skindergade 38, the centre of Copenhagen. Struers introduced in 1943 Micropol, a new principle for electrolytic polishing which made the preparation process within metallography more controlled in order to achieve better preparation results.

== Career ==
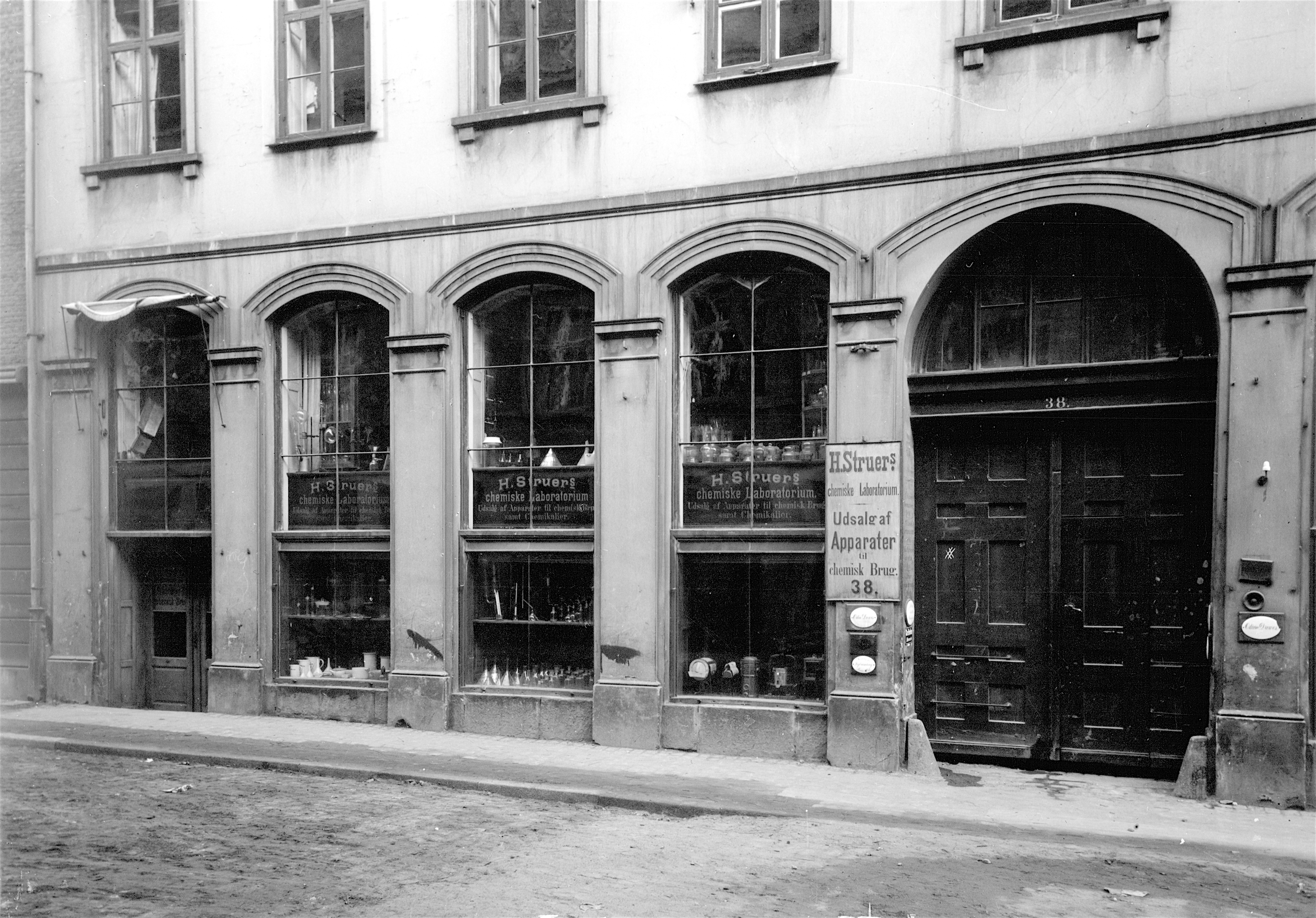
H. Struer's Chemical Laboratory photographed by Frederik Riise.

The development of metallography was a continuous struggle to find better and easier methods to prepare metal surfaces for microstructure observation. Struers based his new principle for electrolytic polishing on Count Alois von Beckh Widmanstätten and his early experiments from the beginning of the 19th century that revealed the structure of iron from a meteor which had come down earlier in the century. He noticed that the structure could better be seen on plane, fine polished surfaces. By pouring nitric acid over the surface and letting it react for some time, he actually made a deep etch which developed the macrostructure. Pieces etched this way were used for printing the structure directly on paper. These "nature prints" turned "metallography" into lithography. All these experiments did not lead to any evaluation of the microstructure, but were limited to the macrostructure.

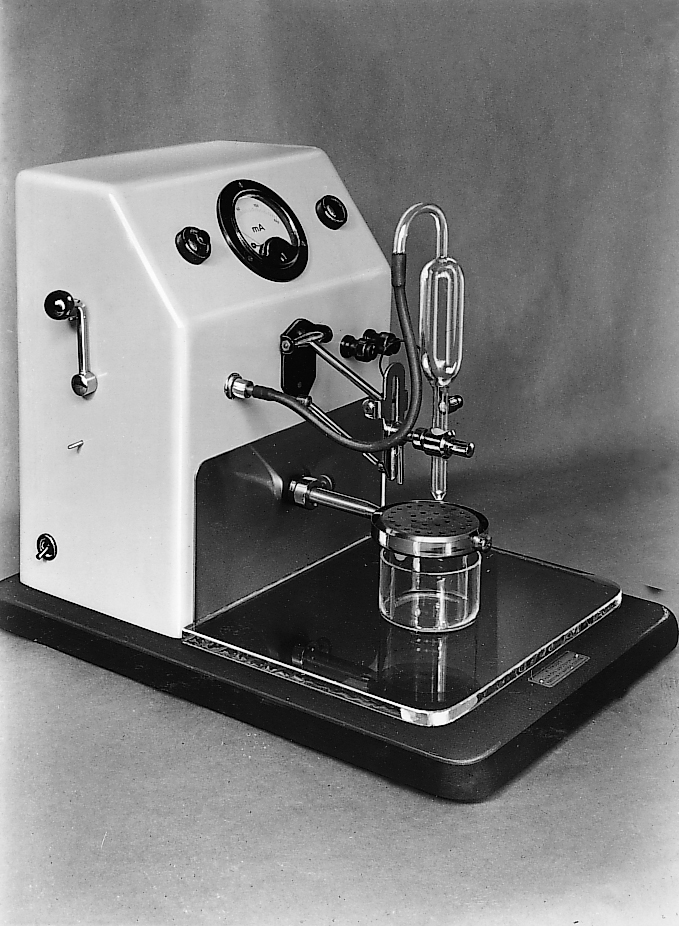
Micropol. Struers Chemiske Laboratorium launched in 1944 the polishing machine Micropol, a new principle for electrolytic polishing.

However, in 1863 Henry Clifton Sorby described in detail how he ground and polished samples in order to examine them under the microscope. He was able to magnify the structure up to 650x. From these observations he drew conclusions regarding the structure of pearlite and ferrite, and he was also able to watch the recrystallization of steel during cold working. For recording the microstructures he used three different methods available at the time: drawings, "nature printing" and microphotography. Considering that his research in the area of metallography only lasted two years, he discovered and established a wealth of information, and Sorby is considered to be the founder of metallography.

Holger F. Struer saw the need for a laboratory making chemical analysis in the strongly developing "modern society", and in 1895 Struer began importing chemicals and instruments for the Danish market. In 1919 Struer obtained the Danish representation of the Austrian company, Reichert, a specialist in metallographic microscopes. The combination of chemical knowledge and the sale of metallographic microscopes changed the focus of Struer's company to metallography and metallographic analysis. In 1943 H. Struers Chemiske Laboratorium launched Micropol, and a new principle for electrolytic polishing was established.

The introduction of Micropol was a technological progress since in this way the materialographic preparation process became more controlled in order to achieve an optimal preparation result in the shortest possible time. Today metallography is a part of materials science in its own right and extends to all fields of application, including ceramics, composites, electronic components and other solid materials.

== Legacy ==
H. Struers Chemiske Laboratorium is still active within metallography but is today just called "Struers Aps".

== Bibliography ==
- "The Construction of Laboratory Apparatus for Schools", Unesco, added author Struers Chemiske Laboratorium, Paris, 1954
- Struers, H. (1955), "The Construction of Laboratory Apparatus for Schools", Science Education, 41 (3): 247, doi:10.1002/sce.3730410373.
- "Metallographic and Materialographic Specimen Preparation, Light Microscopy, Image Analysis and Hardness Testing", Kay Geels in collaboration with Struers, ASTM International 2006 engineers.ihs.com
