= Julia Jacquette =

American artist

Julia Jacquette (born 1964) is an American artist primarily based in New York City and Amsterdam. She grew up on the Upper West Side of Manhattan. Jacquette earned degrees from Skidmore College in Saratoga Springs, N.Y. (1986), and Hunter College in New York City (1989–92).

Jacquette's work has been shown widely at galleries and museums around the world, including Holly Solomon Gallery in New York City; David Klein Gallery in Birmingham, Mich.; the Museum of Modern Art in New York; and Galerie Oliver Schweden in Munich, Germany. Her work is featured in several prestigious collections, including the Museum of Modern Art in New York City; the National Museum of Women in the Arts; the Rhode Island School of Design Museum in Providence, R.I.; the Museum of Contemporary Art in Sydney, Australia; and the Museum of Fine Arts in Boston.

She is a member of the board of directors of the MacDowell art colony in Peterborough, New Hampshire.

In 2017, Unrequited and Acts of Play, a retrospective exhibit, was mounted at the Wellin Museum in Clinton, New York. The exhibit featured site-specific murals, a variety of paintings, and a series of gouache drawings.

Jacquette has taught at the Rhode Island School of Design and Princeton University, and currently teaches at the Fashion Institute of Technology in NYC.

Her first major monograph is Unrequited and Acts of Play, which describes and shows artistic explorations about the challenges of navigating the contemporary media landscape. Her first graphic memoir is Playground of My Mind, which is about her childhood in Manhattan in the 1960s and 1970s.
