= Bräde =

Swedish tables game

- Other names: Bräde, Swedish tables, svenskt brädspel. Historical versions: verquere, révertier, förkeren, verkeer.
- Genres: Board game Dice game Tables game
- Players: 2
- Movement: parallel, anticlockwise
- Chance: Medium (dice rolling)
- Skills: Strategy, tactics, counting, probability

Bräde, also known generically as Swedish tables, is a Swedish tables game that evolved from verquere, a historical game of probable Dutch origin. As with all such games, it is played on the standard tables board of twenty-four points; as with most, it uses all fifteen men per side and two dice. Verquere is a game of parallel movement (unlike backgammon or trictrac), meaning that the men move in the same direction.

== Names ==
Verquere went under different names in different countries including verkeer in Dutch, Verkehren in German, revertier in French, förkeren in Swedish, forkering in Danish, forkæring in Norwegian and forkæringur in Icelandic.

In Sweden and Iceland, verquere became so dominant that the generic terms for tables games—bräde and kotra, respectively—were used metonymically for verquere. The Icelandic variant of the game vanished during the end of the 19th century, and the term kotra in modern Icelandic is used for English backgammon. The Swedish variant, on the other hand, maintained its popularity and evolved into the game that now is known as svenskt brädspel ("Swedish Tables") or bräde ("Tables").

== Equipment ==
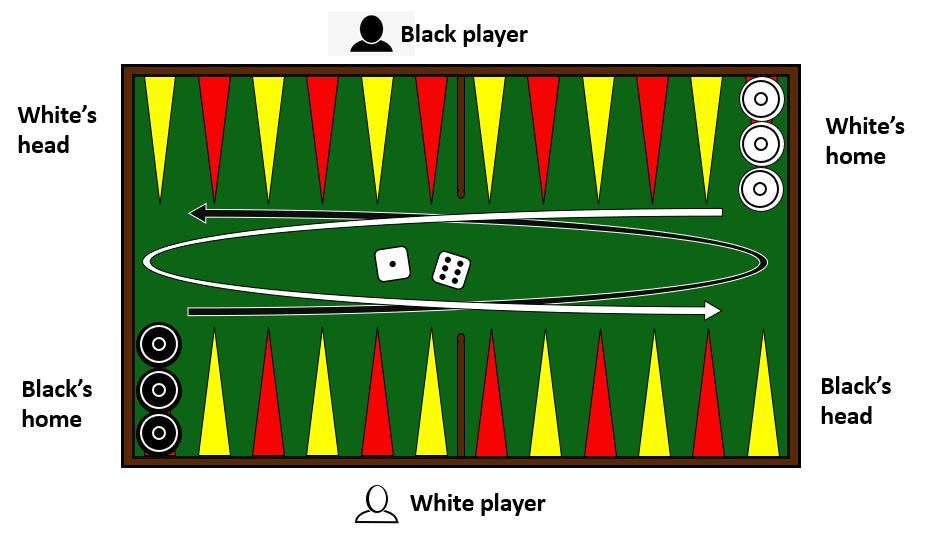
The starting position of the men in verquere as well as in bräde. The direction of movement for the men is indicated with the arrows.

To play bräde or verquere, one needs a tables board, two pairs of dice, fifteen identical light pieces ("men"), and fifteen identical dark pieces. The board is usually built into a table or a folding box. On the inside of the board, along both long sides, there are twenty-four triangular fields (twelve on each side) called points. The points are alternately dark (black or red) and light (white or yellow). In the middle of each long side there is a projecting bar that divides the twelve points into two groups of six points each. Each group of six points forms a quadrant.

A game of bräde is played by two people sitting opposite each other on the long sides of the board. One player uses the white men and the other the black men. Before the game begins, each player sets up their men on the point farthest to the right on the opposite side of the board. This point is called the player's talon (hem in Swedish = "home"). The game is a race in which the goal is to move one's men as quickly as possible one full lap around the board and play them out to an imaginary point outside the board, while at the same time trying to prevent the opponent from advancing by building obstacles and hitting his men. A player can win by being the first to take out all his men, but it is also possible to win by arranging all one's men in a special pattern in the final quadrant, or by hitting so many of the opponent's men that he cannot enter them back onto the board.

The players each use their own pair of dice. To decide who begins the first game of a match, each player rolls one of his dice. This is called teka. The player who rolls lowest begins. If the players roll the same number, they teka again. In the remaining games of the match, the loser of the previous game always begins.

== History and culture ==
Verquere was probably invented in the Netherlands, and the first written reference is from the end of the 14th century. During the 17th and the 18th century, the game was widely played and very popular in the Netherlands, Germany, and the Nordic countries. It was also known in Great Britain and France, although backgammon and trictrac, respectively, were more common there.

The earliest accounts of the rules of verquere are from the beginning of the 18th century, in French, Swedish, and German publications. The French book (known today among trictrac enthusiasts as le Charpentier in honour of its first publisher) was particularly noteworthy, as it simultaneously provided, in 1698, the first modern, complete rules of trictrac as well as of backgammon (which was called in French by the now somewhat archaic name toutes tables), as well as the rules of verquere as they then stood (it having evolved to some extent since this time); it was known to have been reprinted in numerous editions and under numerous titles, at least until 1802.

It may be noted that the several race games described in le Charpentier are all described by analogy with trictrac (which isn't a race game at all), though they are complete and fluent (though variously out of date—doublets is entirely outmoded, backgammon lacks only the doubling cube, and trictrac, presented only in its twelve-hole variant, has essentially the modern rules) once one has an understanding of the latter. With trictrac being a reasonably complex game, English sources might perhaps be preferred for their familiarity, though the French prose might be seen as more modern by the contemporary reader. The first English account is in a book from 1721.

The artistic appearance of traditional Swedish boards, designed chiefly for play of verquere and bräde, differs slightly from the boards used to play backgammon or trictrac (though the item pictured in most of the figures hereinbelow is intended for trictrac—tables boards are, in large part, functionally interchangeable). The men are usually around 50 millimetres (2 inches) in diameter. The board is rectangular, with the long sides twice as long as the ends. The bar is split in two separate parts. The dark points are usually red, the light ones yellow, and the background of the board green. On backgammon boards, up to five men may be placed on a point before they must be stacked, but in verquere, no more than two men should be placed on a point before stacking the men, except when the number of men on one point is very large (e.g. in the home in the beginning of the game). Additional men are arranged in stacks of equal height on the two bottom men, with odd men placed centred on top of the two stacks. (The origin of this practice lies in the construction of Swedish boards. The points are typically short and wide; they won't fit more than two or three stacks.) On traditional Swedish boards, the centre bar is often split in half, rather than being uninterrupted.

=== The evolution of the rules ===
When compared to the French rules published by Charpentier (which term the game révertier as usual in French), the rules of bräde, as published by the Swedish Tables Association at the Vasa Museum, differ in seven key respects.

1. Forcing entry against an invulnerable point: In révertier, if a player has too many men on the bar and too few legal entry points, they may simply be stuck waiting. In bräde, if there are more men on the bar than normally available entry points, the player may enter on an opponent's "invulnerable" point, even one occupied by two or more opposing men, and send all those opposing men to the bar. This is the main anti-stalemate rule.
2. Forcing a prime: Révertier allows a full six- or seven-point block in the return game. Bräde still allows such a block, but the opponent may force one of the blocked points, landing on or passing through it and sending all men on that point to the bar. The blocker's head is exempt.
3. Jan and forced jan as formal high-value wins: Révertier already has definitive blockage as a double win. Bräde doubles its value yet again and adds forced jan, worth 6 points, when the winning terminal blockage results from one of the modern forcing rules. This is presented as the great coup of the game.
4. "Nice games" – pattern victories: Révertier is basically won by bearing off or permanently blocking the opponent (the German sources add to this the tower). Swedish Tables adds four nice-game formations, each worth 2 points: simple crown, double crown, staircase, and tower. These are winning arrangements of all 15 men in the final quadrant.
5. Monk bonus: If a player wins by bearing off or by a nice game while the opponent still has men on the bar, bräde adds +1 point. Those stranded men are called monks.
6. A slower, stricter bearing-off rule: Révertier uses the same bearing-off method as in backgammon and in trictrac. Bräde uses the slower, so-called provincial bearing-off method as formerly practiced regionally in trictrac: during bearing off, one must play the maximum possible pips inside the board before bearing off. This delays exit and gives the opponent more counterplay.
7. Endgame exception to die-priority rules: Normally, bräde keeps the obligation to play both dice if possible, otherwise the higher die. But if a roll can immediately win by bearing off, jan, or a nice game, the player may ignore the usual priority rule to take the win. The game ends at once.

== Rules ==
The rules given here are largely from the latest official rules, published by the Swedish Tables Association, which meets at the Vasa Museum. Some account has been taken of the last known edition of the anonymous French rules to révertier. (Certain technical terms have been left in their original languages, French and Swedish, in brackets.)

=== Movement of the men ===
The players take turns rolling the dice and moving their men forward on the points anticlockwise around the board. The men are first moved from the talon and onward to the left along the opposite side of the board, then across to the player's own side of the board and onward to the right. In what follows, the quadrants are numbered from one to four along the men' path of travel. Note that White's first quadrant is Black's third quadrant, and so on. The men may not be moved out of the player's fourth quadrant until the end of the game, when the bearing-off phase has begun.

A man must always be moved forward exactly as many points as the number of pips on the die used for that move. A player may choose to move one or two men. For example, if the player has rolled 6–4, he may either move one man ten points forward, called tout d'une, or move one man four points forward and another man six points forward (if this is from the talon, it's called tout à bas). Taking the full throw with one man is always considered two moves, one for each die. The man may therefore not be moved directly to its final destination point, but must land along the way: in the example with 6–4, either on the fourth or the sixth point.

If both dice show the same number of pips, the player has rolled doubles or an "all". Each die in an all is counted twice, meaning that the player must make a total of four moves for the number of pips shown on each die. For example, with 5–5, called "all-fives", the player moves for four fives, not two, and may choose to move one, two, three, or four men. If the player moves only one man, it must land three times along the way before finally landing on the twentieth point from its origin.

If a player can move for both dice, he is obliged to do so, but in some cases this is not possible. The player must then use as many of the dice pips as possible. If he can move for only one die, he must move for that die and surrender the other. Giving up a die is called a fåta or an impotence (impuissance, dame impuissante, etc.). Sometimes a special situation arises in which the player can move for either die, but not for both. He must then use the higher and pass up the lower. Similarly, if a player cannot move four times on an "all", he must move as many times as possible.

A player who cannot move at all leaves the entire throw impotent and skips his turn until the next roll.

=== Blots, made points, builders ===
A single man on a point is called a blot (blotta, demi-case), while two or more men form a made point (band, case). If the band consists of at least three men, it is called, in Swedish or French, an överband or surcase; in English, the term builder is applied to the extra men, not to the point. When a player moves a man so that a point is made, he is said to make a point. If the men in a made point are moved apart so that they once again become blots, this is called breaking a point. By tradition, an even number of men in a band is always arranged in two equal stacks. Odd men are placed in the middle on top of the two stacks.

A blot is unprotected and can be hit by the opponent's men. A made point, by contrast, is protected and cannot be hit under normal circumstances (i.e., except in the event that the player has built an impassable obstacle with his made points).

=== Hitting and entering ===
A blot is hit when one of the opponent's men lands or touches down on the point where the blot lies. The man hit is placed on the bar, or (if the bar is too narrow or does not run from edge to edge across the board) in the middle of the board. A player who has had one or more men hit may not move any other man on the board until the hit men have been entered again.

Hit men must be entered in the first quadrant, where the player has his talon. For example, if a player has one hit man and moves for 3–2, he may choose to move the man either to the 2-point or to the 3-point. From there, he may move the man onward to the 5-point, or move another man on the board. It is not permitted, however, to combine the sum of the dice pips and move the man directly to the 5-point. Note that a man being entered does not land on the same point as a man taken from the talon, because the entered man starts outside the board and passes the talon on the way. A man taken from the talon for a three, for example, lands on the 4-point, while a man being entered lands on the 3-point.

Pieces may only be entered on empty points or on points where the opponent has a blot. In the latter case, the opponent's blot is of course hit and must in turn be entered by the opponent. It is not permitted to enter men on one's own blots or onto a made point of one's own in home. Nor is it permitted to enter a man on any of the opponent's made points, unless he has made so many points in the first quadrant that they form an impassable obstacle. If a player tries to enter a man but does not hit any available point, he must skip his turn (fåta).

=== Points which must not be made ===
On the opposite side of the board, a player may make only the point farthest to the left, that is, the sixth point in the second quadrant. This point is called the player's head (huk, tête) and is, for obvious reasons, very valuable in the game. It is not permitted to make any of the other points in the first or second quadrant. On the player's own side of the board, that is, in the third and fourth quadrants, the player may make points anywhere. The men stacked on the talon at the beginning of the game are considered a made point, but because the player may not enter men on the talon while he still has his own men there, it is impossible for him to make a point on the talon once broken.

Pieces may pass the opponent's made points without difficulty, but it is not permitted either to touch down or to land on a talon where the opponent has a made point. A player who keeps his made points well grouped therefore makes it difficult for the opponent to get past. A five-point "prime", for example, can only be passed when the opponent moves a man lying immediately behind the prime with a six. A six- or seven-point prime would in principle be impossible to pass, but as mentioned earlier, made points are not protected if they form an impassable obstacle. An important strategic subgoal in bräde is to try to build obstacles of up to five made points in a row.

=== Made points may be broken by force ===
If it is impossible for a player to get past the opponent's bands anywhere on the board, the player has the right to make room by forcing one of them open (spränga = explode). A made point is forced open when the player lands, touches down, or enters a man on that point. All men in the point broken by force are treated as hit and must be entered by the opponent.

Impassable obstacles of this kind can arise in two different situations. The first case is when the opponent has made more than five points in a row. The player then has the right to break any one of the points by force, but he is not required to do so if there are other possible moves with the dice. Note that the opponent's made points must form a continuous obstacle in the player's march in order to be broken by force. In the unlikely case that the opponent has made a point on his head and on the first five points of his third quadrant, the player may not break by force; the whole obstacle does not lie in the player's path of travel, since he may never play men from the opponent's head, that is, the sixth point in his own fourth quadrant, to the opponent's third quadrant, that is, his own first quadrant.

The second situation in which a player may break a point by force is when he has hit men that must be entered, but the number of hit men is greater than the number of available points in the first quadrant. A point is available if it is empty or if the opponent has a blot on it. If one of the player's men is entered on one of the opponent's made points in this situation, all men on that point are hit and must be entered by the opponent. Note that the made points may be forced open even before all available points in the first quadrant have been used by the player. The opponent is obliged to leave enough space so that all hit men can always fit into the available space in the first quadrant.

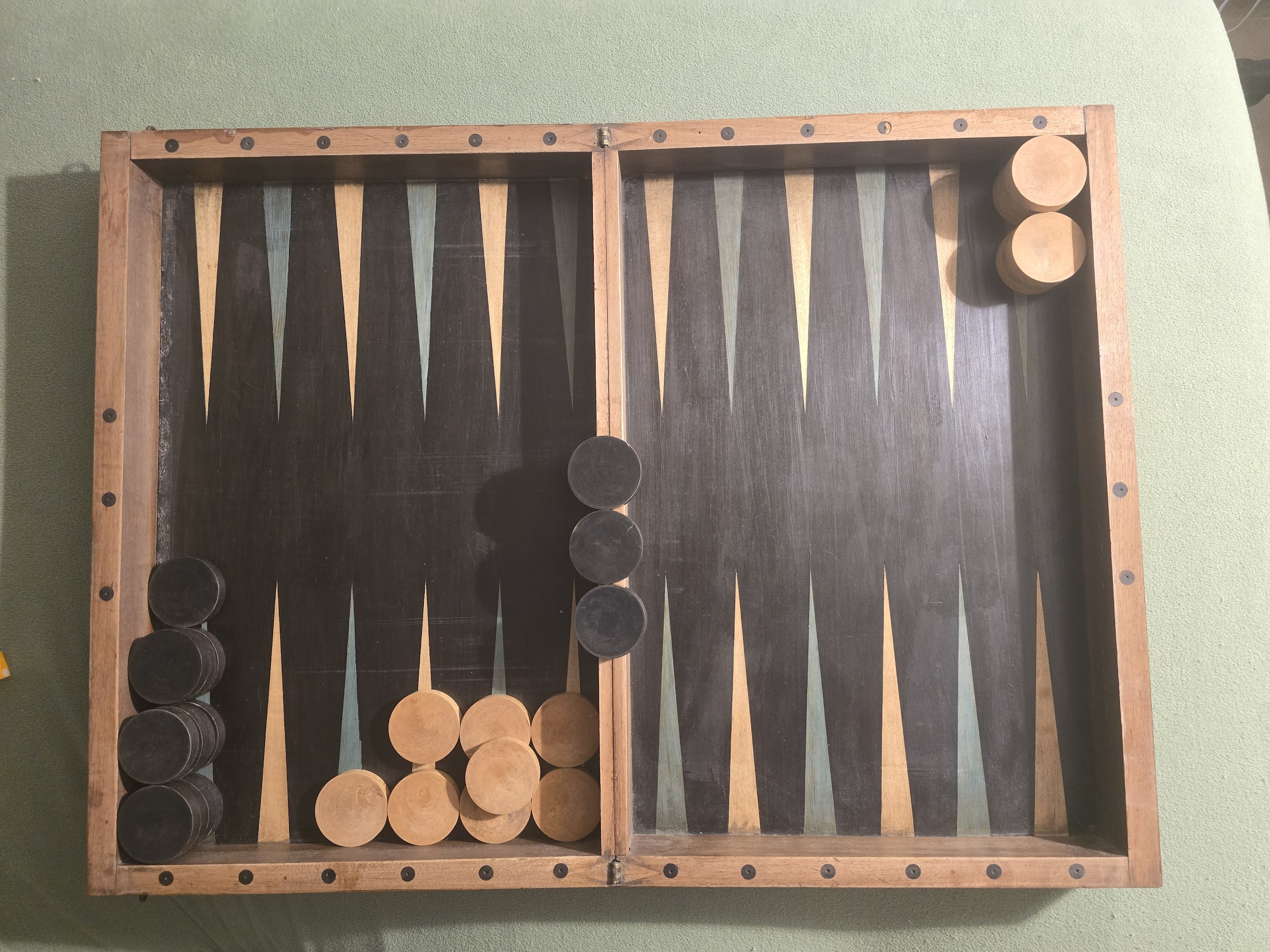
This position allows Black to force exactly one point open.

The figure to the right shows Black's home quadrant on the lower left. He has three hit men to enter, but only two available points, the 2-point and the 3-point. Black may therefore force one of the opponent's full points open, but as soon as this has been done, the number of hit men will no longer exceed the number of available points, and Black's right to force ends. If Black rolls 6–2, he forces the 6-point with the six and enters a man on the 2-point with the two. If Black rolls 5–3, he forces the 5-point with the five and hits the blot on the 3-point with the three. If Black rolls 6–5, he forces the 6-point with the six and is impotent to use the five. It is not permitted to force the 5-point in this case, because Black is obliged to use the higher die. If Black rolls 2–1, he enters a man with the two and is impotent to use the one.

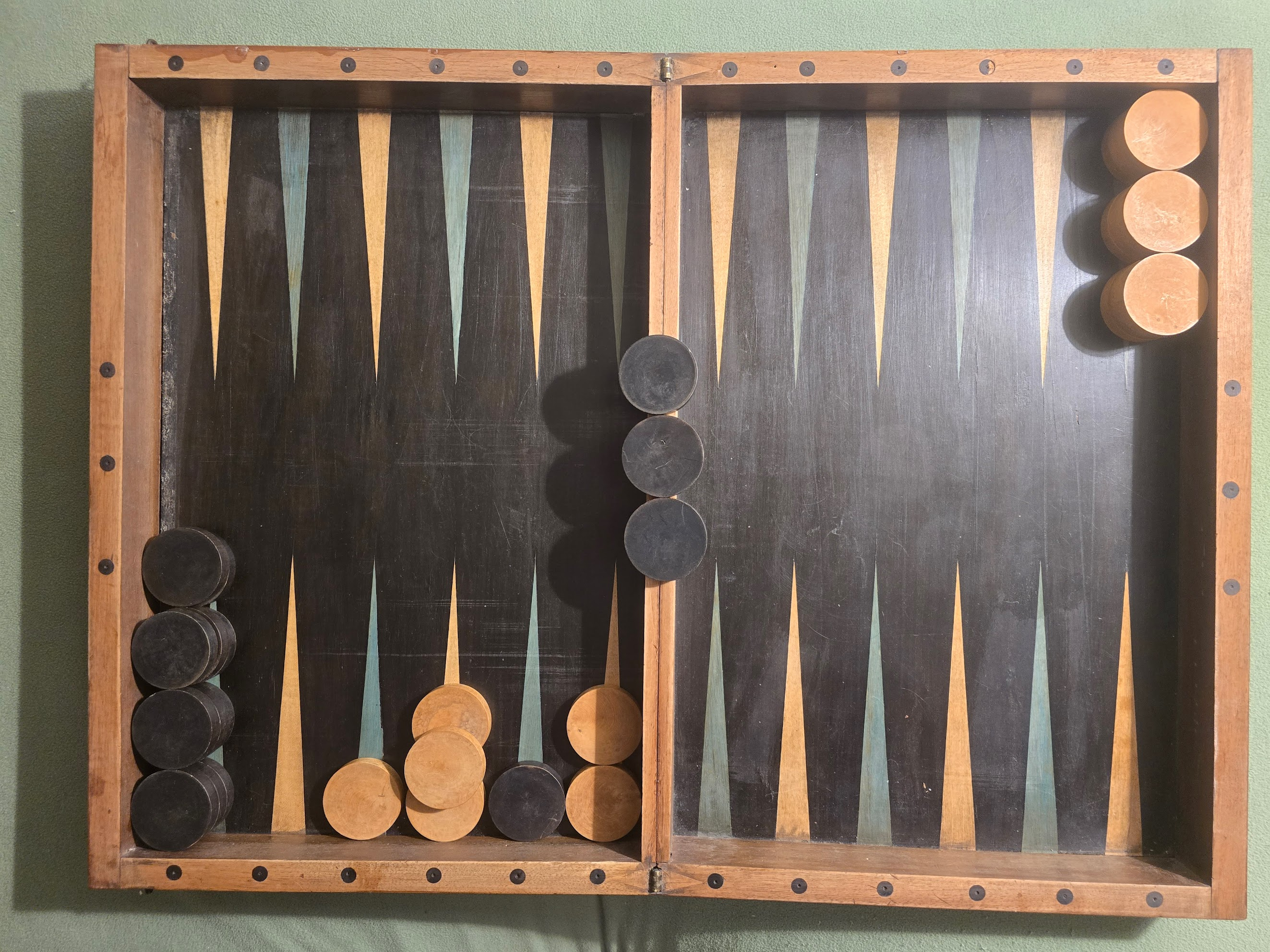
Example: Black player has become Junker. There are three men on the bar. Black can at the moment only re-enter two of them and must therefore pass his turn.

There is one exception to the above rules on forcing points open: if a player has borne off fourteen men and has only one man left in play, no made point may be broken by force under any circumstances. This rule becomes relevant when the player who has only one man left has his last man hit. The opponent then has the right to block the player with six or seven bands in a row, so that the man cannot get past or perhaps cannot even enter the board. If the player's man happens to land immediately next to such a block, the player can no longer move, regardless of what he rolls, and must skip his throw. In such a case he is called a squire (Junker q.v.).

=== Bear-off ===
A player can win a game of verquere in several different ways. The simplest victory is called win by bear-off (hemspel = home-play) and means that the player plays all his men to an imaginary twenty-fifth point outside the board. One can also say that the player bears off his men or that the player's men are borne off. Originally, the men were literally played back to "home" (i.e. the talon). Pieces, once moved over to the talon, were naturally out of play; the talon was therefore regarded as empty and available for entering men, as long as only men borne off were there. To avoid confusion between different roles of men, men borne off are now removed from the board and placed altogether outside the playing area.

A player may not begin bearing off his men until he has gathered them all in the fourth quadrant. If one or more men are hit for a player who has begun playing home his men, no more men may be played home until the hit man or men have been returned to the fourth quadrant.

A player who uses a die on any particular man may only bear the man off if it lies last, or tied for last, among all the player's men in the fourth quadrant. If the die shows too few pips to bear the last man off, the player must instead move one of his men forward. If this is not possible, the player must surrender the opportunity. A man that touches down one or more times before being borne off must be last at each touchdown. If a die shows exactly the number of pips needed to bear the last man off, that man is always borne off; there is no other way to use the die. This is called bearing off exactly. If a die shows more than is needed to bear the last man off, that man may be played home even though it does not actually land on the imaginary point outside the board. One says that the throw is reduced, because the die's pips are not used in full. A player must always keep the total reduction in the throw as small as possible.

In the numbered figures below, White has begun bearing off and has no men out in the first, second, or third quadrants.

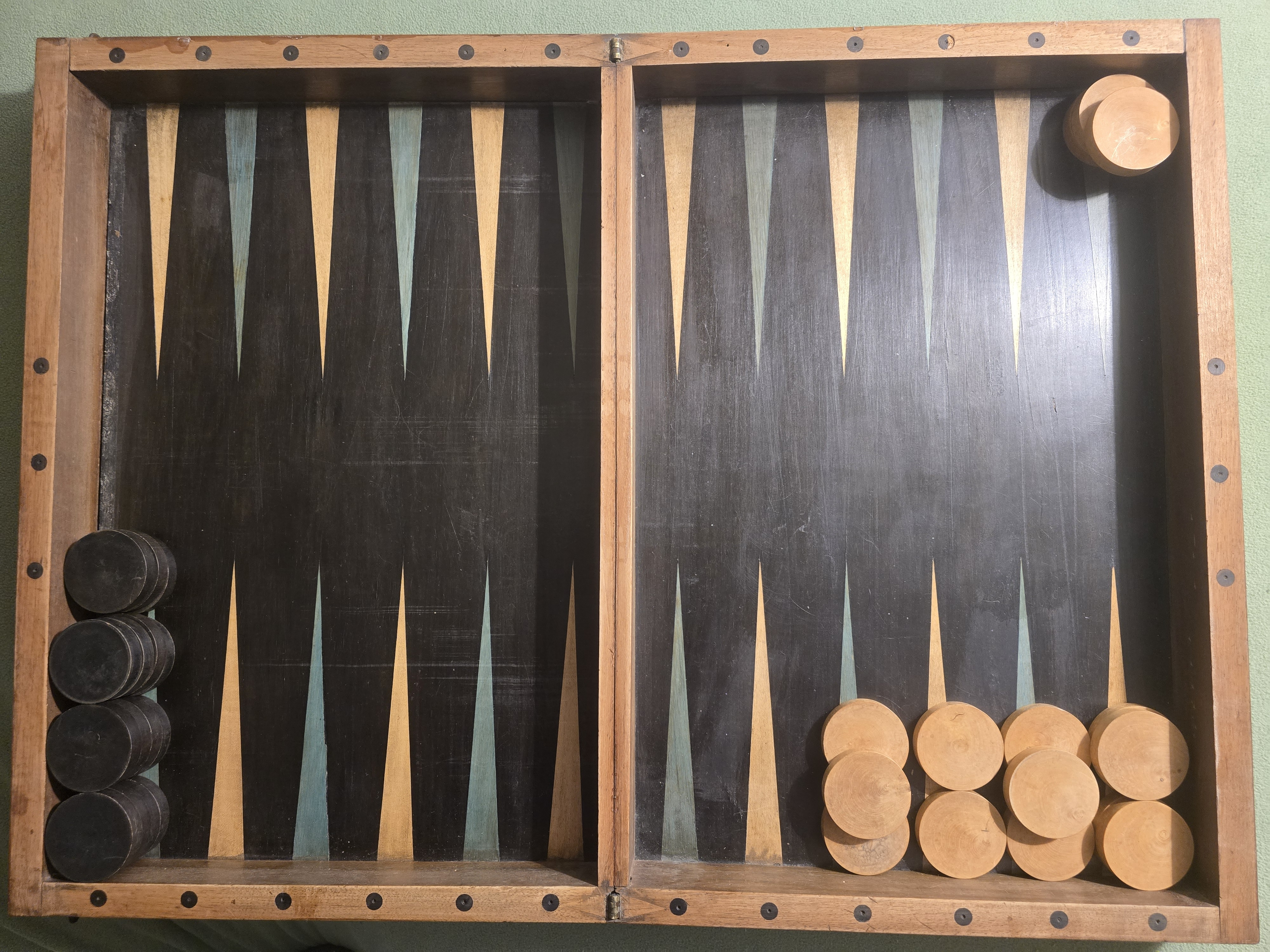
Figure 1

In figure 1, White rolls 3–2. White may not bear any men off, whether from the 22-point or the 23-point, because he still has men on the 21-point. There is only one way to use the three: he must move a man from the 21-point to the 24-point. White must then move another man forward for the two, either from 21 or 22. Whatever he does, a blot is created.

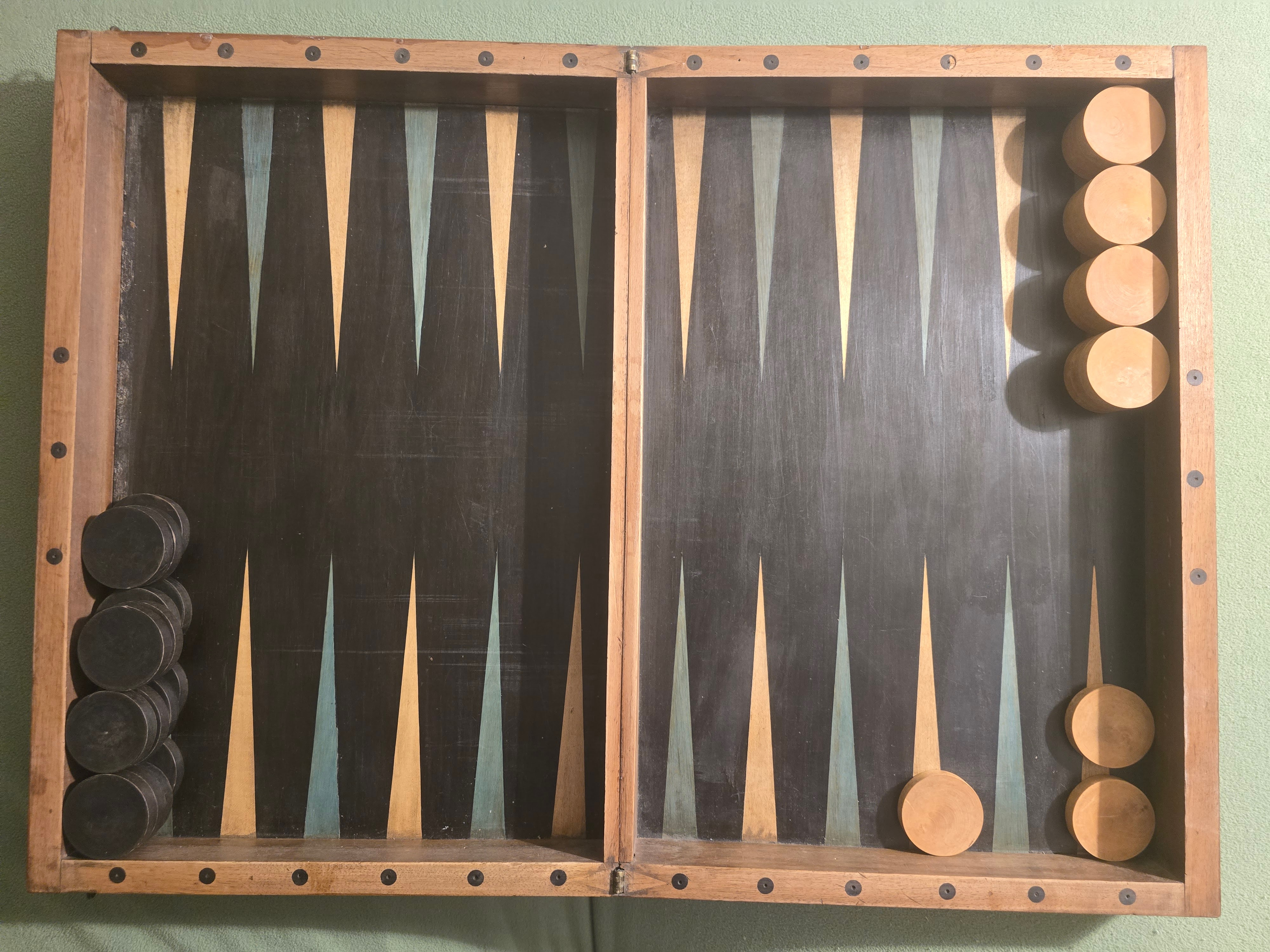
Figure 2

In figure 2, White rolls 5–2. He must bear off one man from the 22-point and one from the 24-point. The total reduction is three pips. In this case too, a blot is left. It is not permitted to move from the 22-point to the 24-point and then bear off the man, because the total reduction would then be four pips.

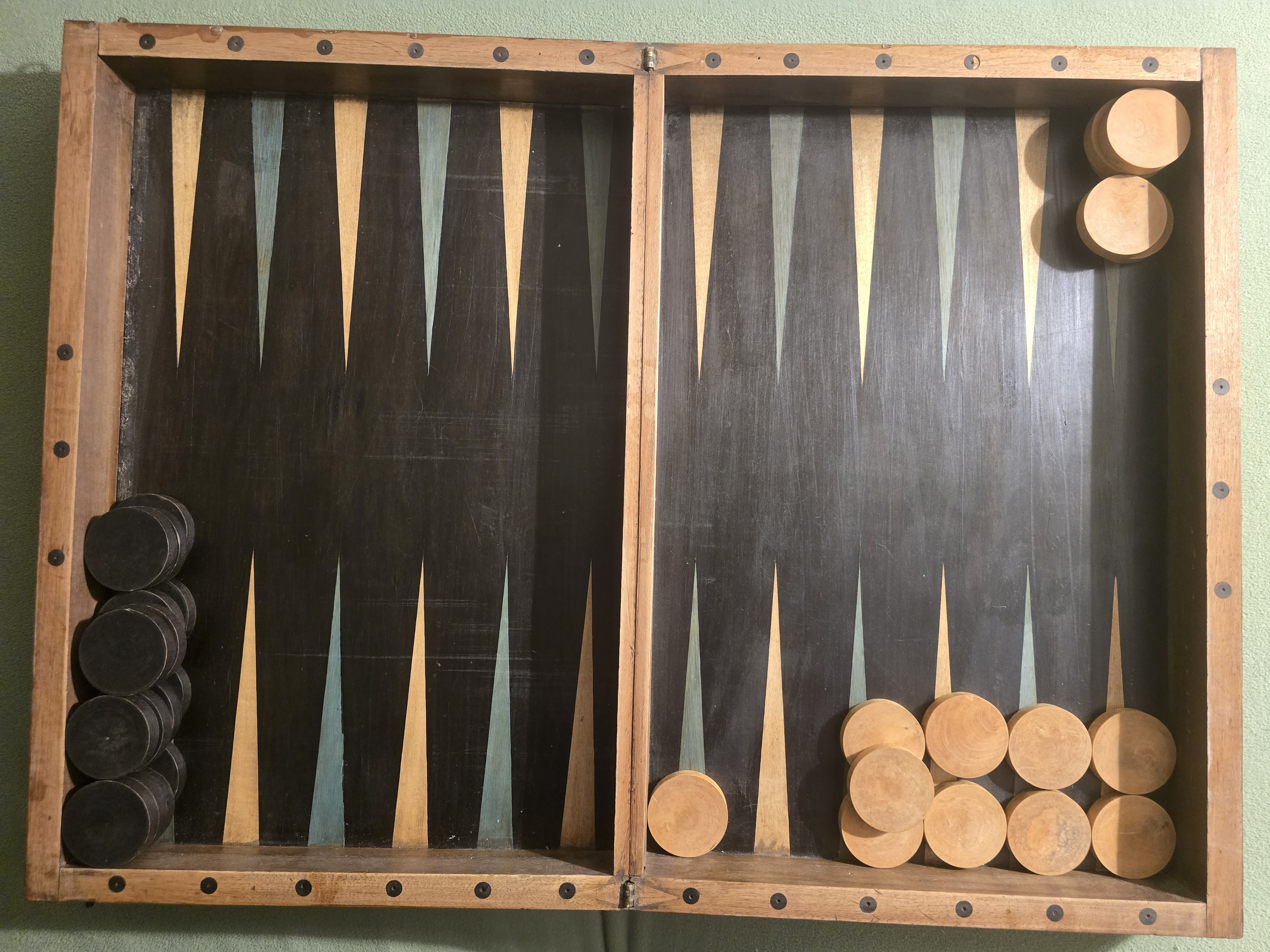
Figure 3

In figure 3, White rolls 5–3. He may not bear off any man. The five can only be used to move the man on the 19-point to the 24-point, and the three to move one of the men on the 21-point to the 24-point.

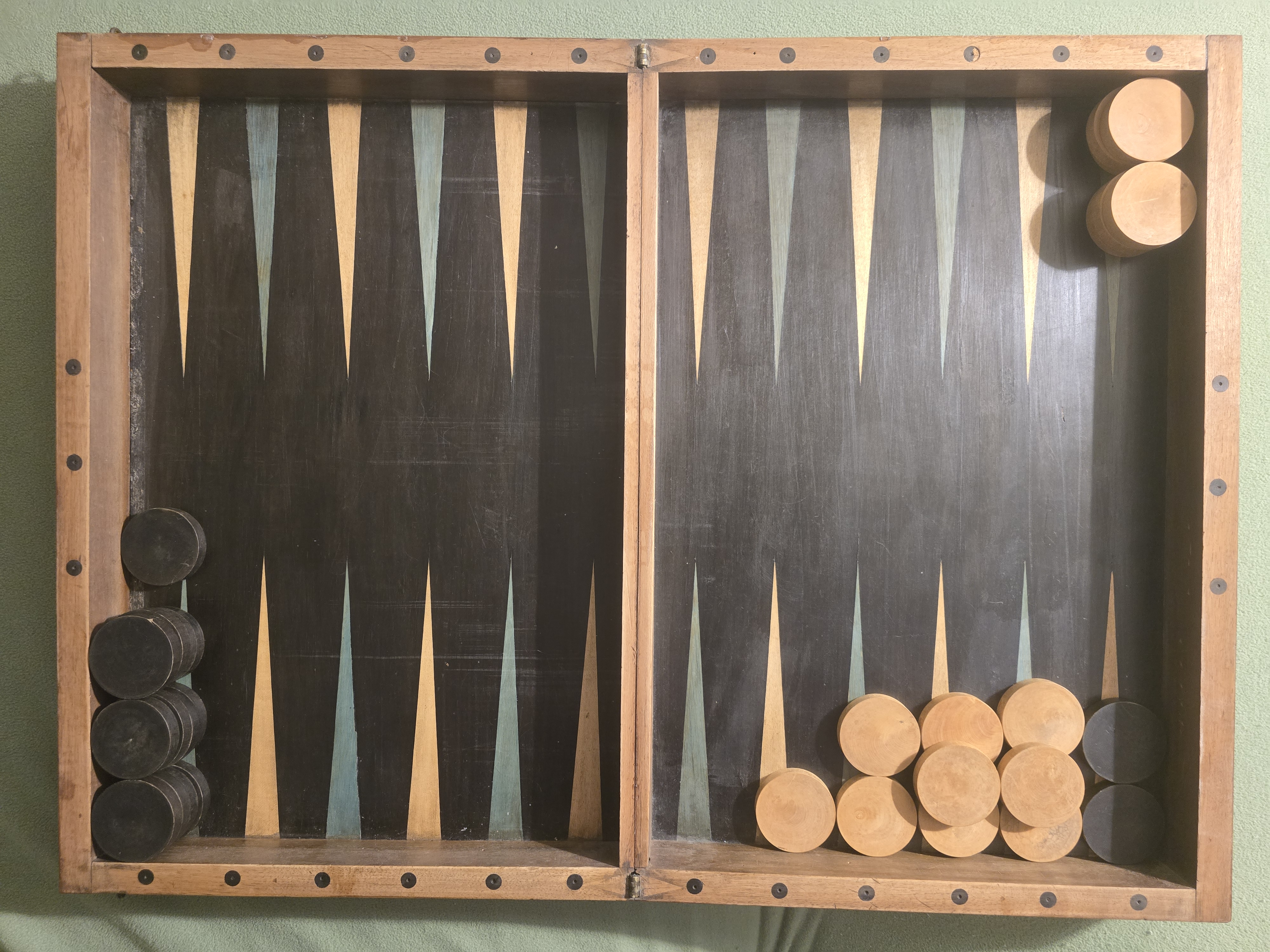
Figure 4

In figure 4, White rolls 4–4. White must surrender the entire roll, because the blot on White's 20-point is blocked by Black's made 12-point, and the men on White's 21-point may not be borne off as long as the man on White's 20-point remains.

=== Nice game ===
A player can win a "nice game" (vackert spel) by arranging his men in one of four predetermined patterns in the fourth quadrant. The four types of nice game are:

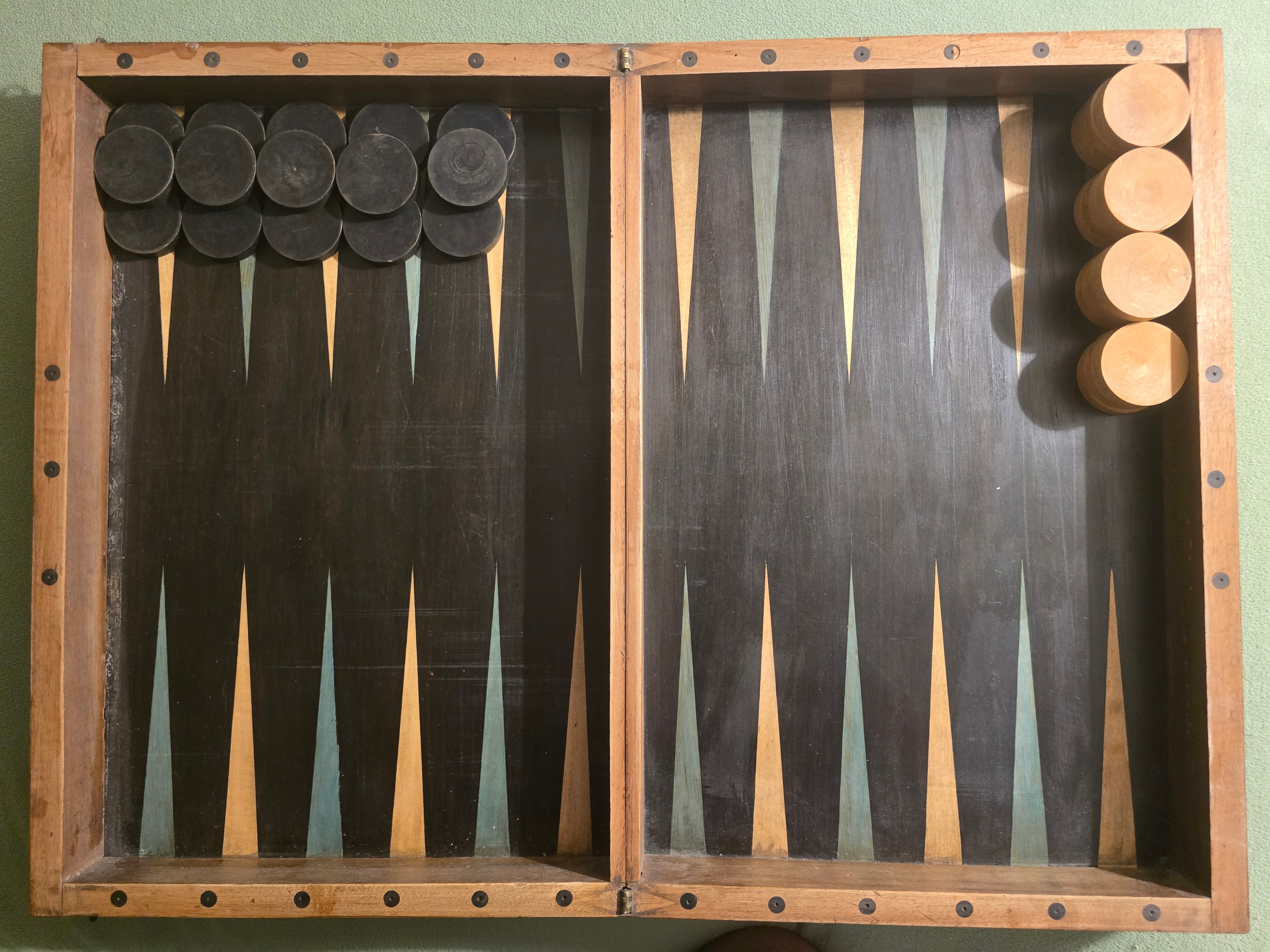
Black wins a nice game by single crown.

Single Crown (simple couronne, enkelt kronspel): Three men on each of the last five points, 20–24.

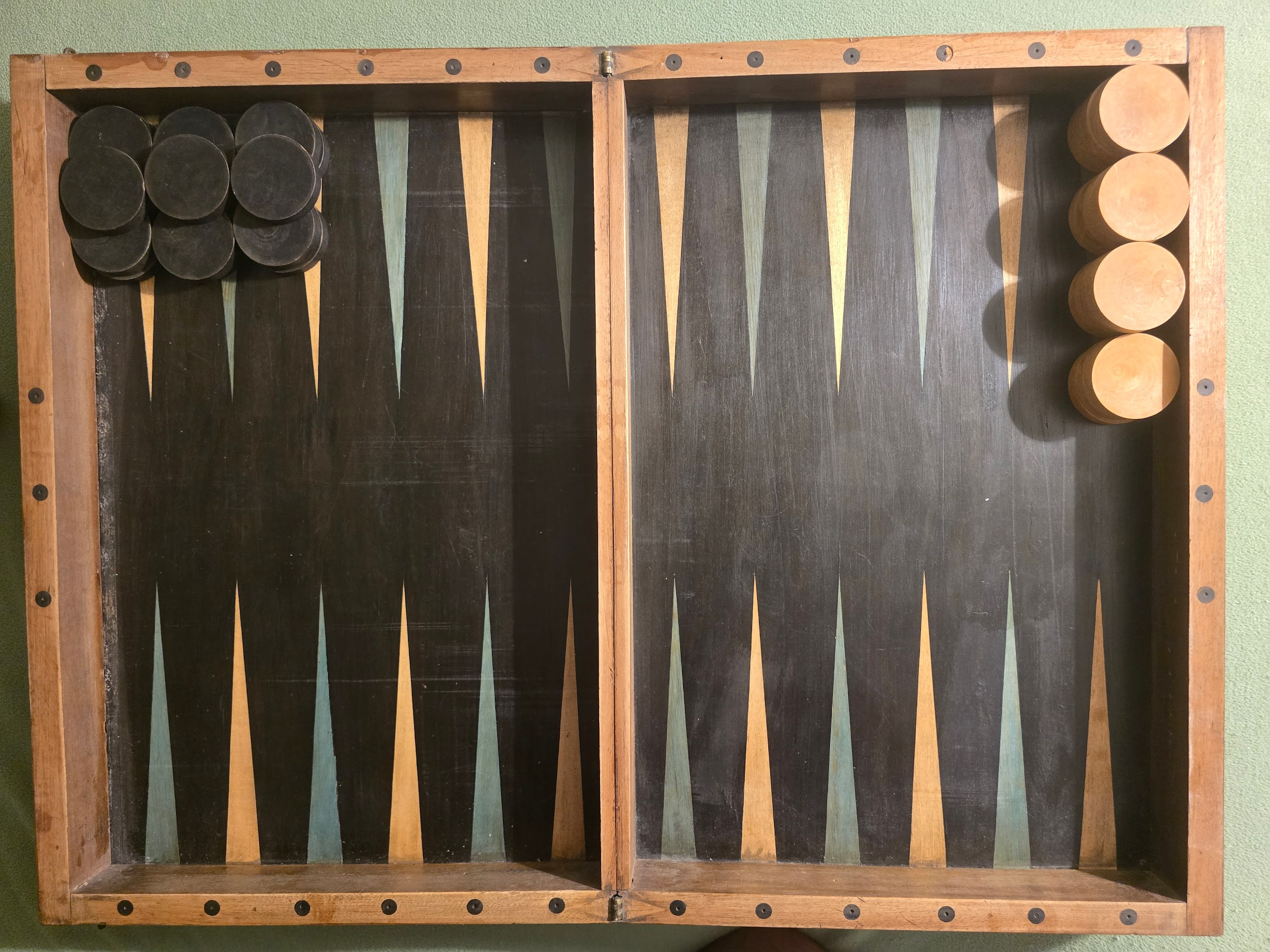
Black wins a nice game by double crown.

Double Crown (double couronne, dubbelt kronspel): Five men on each of the last three points, 22–24.

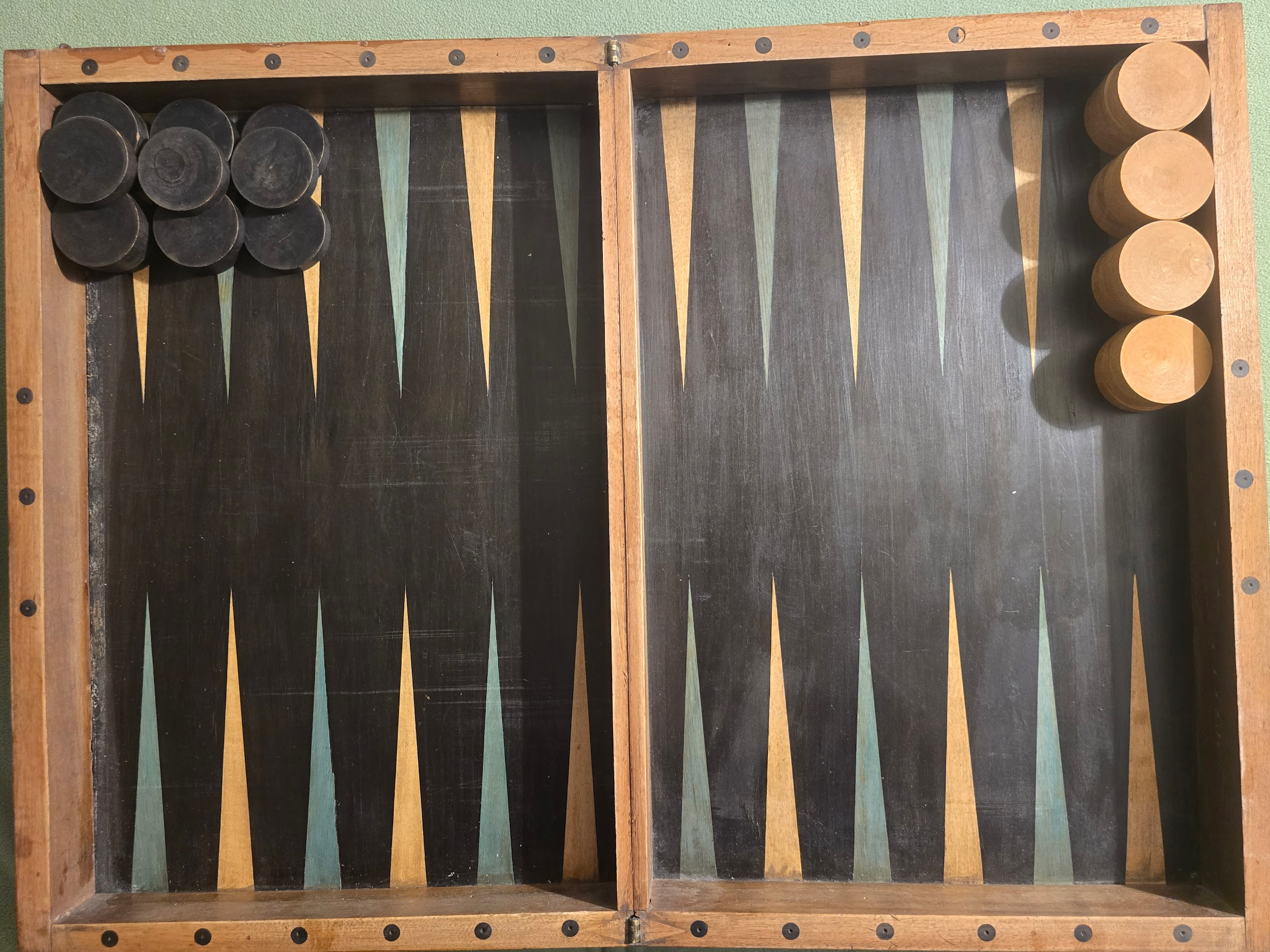
Black wins a nice game by staircase.

Staircase (escalier, trappspel): Seven men on the 24-point; five men on the 23-point; and three men on the 22-point.

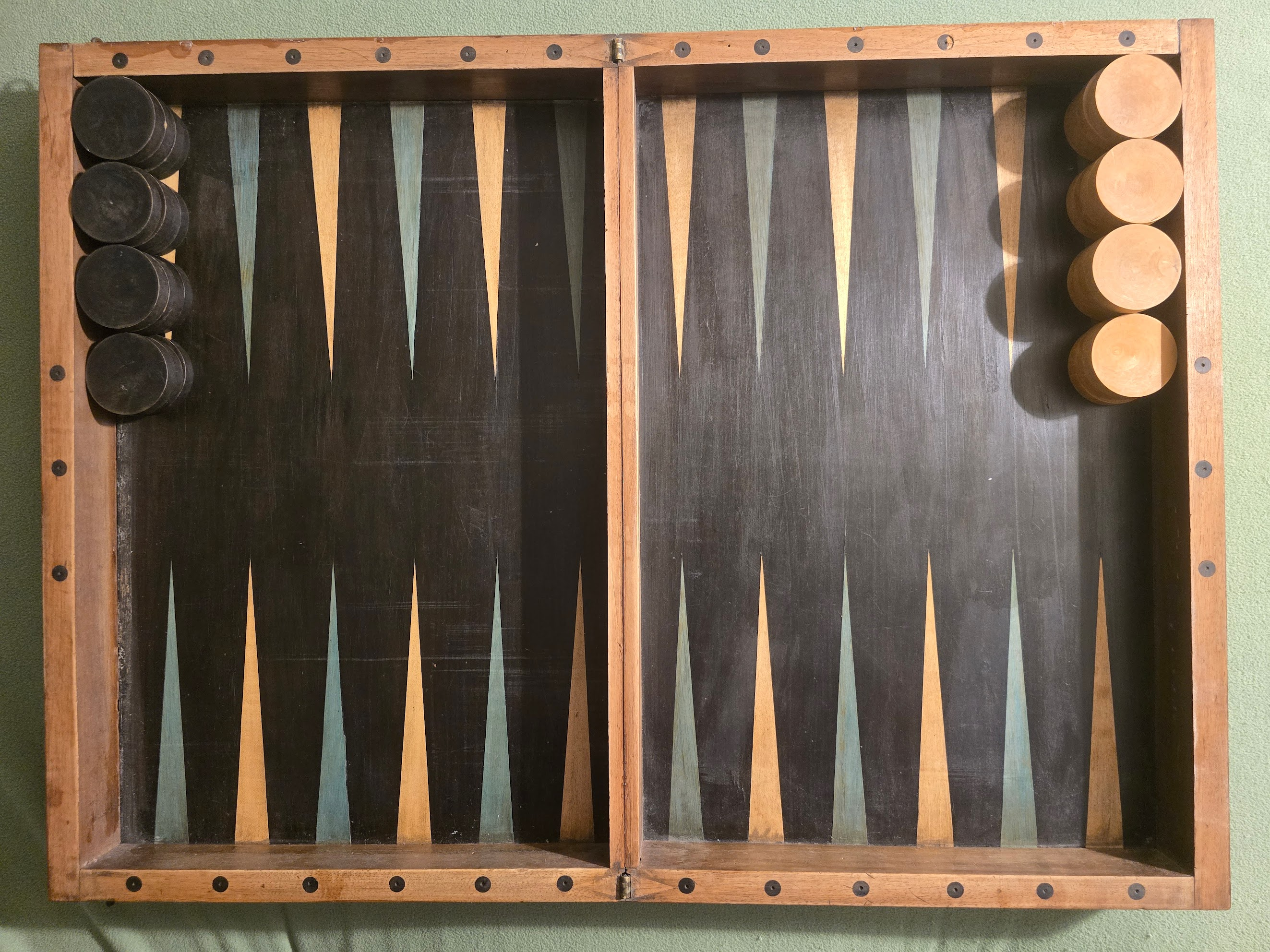
Black wins a nice game by tower.

Tower (tour, uppspel): All fifteen men on the 24-point.

As soon as a player has borne off so much as one man, he has lost the chance to win the.

Historical note: Winning by tower already formed part of the Swedish and German rules by the early 18th century, and was scored at its present rate of double; it was unknown in France or Great Britain at the time (though, given these countries overwhelmingly played trictrac and backgammon, respectively, the rules published in the respective countries may have been incomplete).

=== Monk ===
If a player either bears off or wins a nice game while the opponent has one or more men hit, the value of the victory is higher. One says that the player has borne off or won a nice game, as appropriate, with monk (avec ermite, med munk).

=== John ===
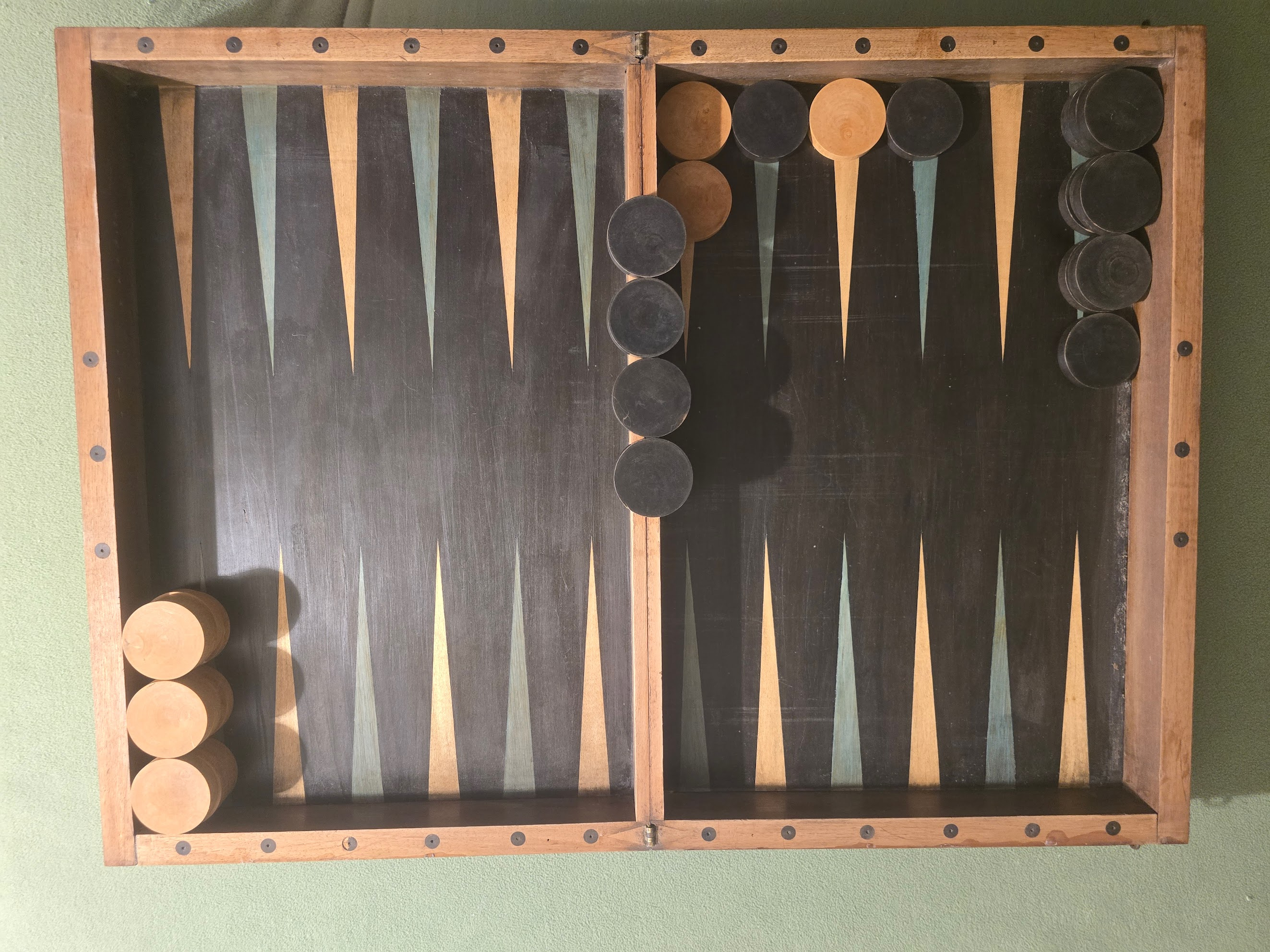
Example: Black has been Johned. There are four hit men on the bar. Black can never re-enter more than three of them. White wins by John.

A player makes his opponent John (jan) if he hits so many men that the opponent cannot possibly enter them again. This occurs when the opponent has more men hit than there are points in his first quadrant that are either empty or occupied by the player's blots or made points; in this case, the opponent would still have hit men left even if he were allowed to continue entering men until he had filled the entire first quadrant.

John is an even more highly valued victory in bräde than it is in verquere, and much of the tactical play in both games is aimed at creating a good position from which to win John. The goal is to make, as quickly as possible, five points in a row somewhere in the opponent's first or second quadrant, which makes it difficult for the opponent to move men from the talon to points in the third and fourth quadrants. Instead, he is forced to abattre du bois ("to chop wood", to break up the talon as quickly as possible) or to break one of his made points. The player hits the new blots that are forced out in the opponent's third and fourth quadrants, while at the same time moving his five made points forward in good order to the opponent's second quadrant, so that the opponent does not get an opportunity to force them open. The player must also make sure regularly to lay out some of his blots in the opponent's first quadrant. The opponent can hardly avoid hitting these, and in this way the player continually gets new men that end up lying in ambush for the enemy blots. When the opponent is forced to expose his seventh blot—or his sixth, if the talon, considered a made point by default, has not yet been broken—one says that he has brought out his John blot (janblot). The player then only has to hit all the opponent's blots outside the first quadrant.

=== Forced John ===
A player can make his opponent John not only by hitting his John blot, but sometimes also by forcibly breaking one of his made points in the first quadrant. This is called a forced John (sprängjan) and is the most prestigious way to win a game of bräde. Note that a forcing does not always result in forced John. If the opponent can still enter the men, he has not lost the game. In some positions, it may even be an advantage to have a made point forcibly broken.

It is both difficult and risky to win by forced John. Such attacks can be launched under various circumstances, but the main principle is as follows: a player gets a hit on two of the opponent's blots at a time when the opponent has many made points (preferably with builders) in the player's first quadrant. The player then tries as quickly as possible to fill all empty tongues in his first quadrant. If he succeeds before the opponent has entered the hit men, he lays out blots in the third quadrant by breaking bands or entering men from the second quadrant. There is a good chance that the opponent will hit one of the laid-out blots when he enters his men. As soon as one of the laid-out blots is hit, the player has the right to force his way in, because his first quadrant is blocked by the opponent's bands and by the men he has just laid out. Sometimes the player must forcibly break more than one made point for the opponent to be forcibly Johned. It is important that the opponent still has two men hit when the player exposes blots in the first quadrant; otherwise, the opponent gets a move for the second die when he enters and can, for example, break made points in the player's first quadrant or take other countermeasures.

(NTS: PICTURE AND REPHRASE) In the figure above, White is trying to make Black sprängjan. The tongues on the board have been numbered from White's point of view, beginning with White's home, tongue 1. White has succeeded in forcing a position in which he may burst; he has two hit men to enter but no available tongues in the first quadrant. If White rolls either a four or a five, Black immediately becomes sprängjan. If White rolls 6–2, 3–2, 2–2, or 2–1, he bursts Black's band on tongue 2 with the two but must fåta the other die. Black now also has the right to burst, and Black has thereby become the favorite in the game: if he rolls a two or a four before White rolls a four or a five, White becomes sprängjan. This rapid change of scene is not an unusual complication in sprängjan situations. Once one has exposed blots in the third quadrant, many of the following moves will be forced moves. The possibilities for influencing the course of events, if one does not get the right dice rolls, are limited, and it is therefore important to be convinced that one is truly the favourite to win before setting the ball rolling.

If White does not hit any of Black's bands, the situation becomes somewhat more complicated. Black is next to roll and has every opportunity to take the initiative in the game, but at the same time he has a large number of bands in his third quadrant that can be burst and must quickly be moved away. It is left as an exercise for the reader to work out how Black should move, for example, for 3–1.

=== The final roll ===
A game is over as soon as any of the following are true:

1. a player has borne off his final man; or
2. arranged his men in one of the four patterns for nice game; or
3. hit more of the opponent's men than the opponent can re-enter.

A player who can end a game is not required to do so if it is possible to make another move instead. However, it is not permitted to continue a game once any of the above three ending criteria has been met, even if the player making the final move has moved for only one of the dice and still has the possibility of moving for the other. For example, a player may not, having rolled all-fives, complete a single crown by moving for two fives and then exposing a blot on the 20-point by bearing off two men. If the opponent has many blots on the bar, this could otherwise give the player a chance for John.

A player who can end the game by using one die does not need to take the other die into account at all. For example, it is permitted to pass up the higher die on the final roll, and if the player has rolled an "all", he may choose freely to move one, two, three, or four times for the dice pips.

A player is not obliged to keep the reduction as small as possible on the final roll. For example, if the player has a blot on the 19-point and the opponent has a blot on the 21-point, the player can win monk with 6–2 by first hitting the opponent's blot with the two and then bearing off the man. The total reduction is two pips. If the player had instead borne off his man with the six and passed up the two, the reduction would be zero.

=== Points ===
A game of bräde can end in seven different ways. In five of these, the winning player can also monk his opponent. The table below shows the points awarded.

When experienced players meet, one can expect between one third and one half of the games to end by bear-off, and between one quarter and one third by nice game and by John, respectively. The rate of games in which someone loses by forced John depends to a very large extent on the players' skill, but is usually around one or two per cent up to seven or eight percent. Monk occurs in about one game in ten. Of the beautiful games, simple crown is the most common and staircase the rarest.

=== Matches ===
A match is played over an odd number of games, usually three, five, or seven. If the players receive the same final score, the player with the highest-valued game according to the table below wins. All games in the same category are considered equally high in this respect, for example staircase and tower, while a game in a lower category is valued higher than a game in a higher category even if the points are the same; for example, staircase is valued higher than tower with monk. If both players' best games are valued equally highly, the next-best games are counted, and so on.

Game	Category	Points
John (by force)	I	6
John	II	4
Single crown (with monk)	III	3
Double crown (with monk)	III	3
Staircase (with monk)	III	3
Tower (with monk)	IV	3
Single crown	IV	2
Double crown	IV	2
Staircase	IV	2
Tower	IV	2
Bear-off (with monk)	V	2
Bear-off	VI	1

== Tactics ==
=== John ===
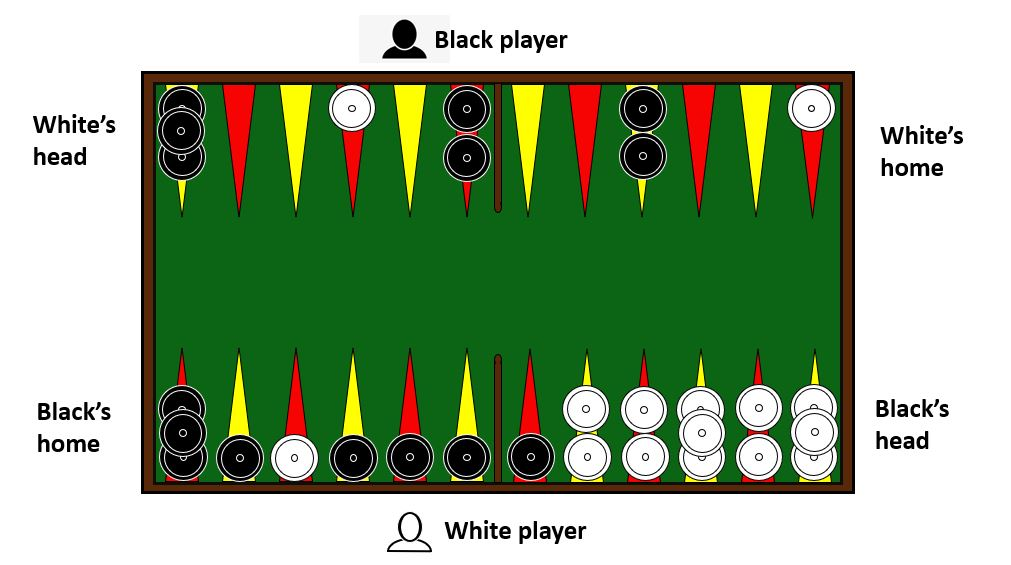
White player is about to make Black player Jean. White has moved his prime to his fourth quadrant and has three men behind that can hit Black's blots. It is Black's turn to roll; and if Black doesn't roll a six or a double, he is forced to expose his Jean blot.

A player has the chance to John his opponent if he gets a head start and manages to build a prime with five or six consecutive closed points in his third and/or fourth quadrant (five points only, if the players have agreed to play with "five closed points"). It is then difficult for the opponent to pass the prime, and the opponent is eventually forced to move more men from home or split closed points. The player hits all new blots that the opponent exposes.

The opponent must re-enter all blots that are hit before he can make other moves on the board and expose additional blots. The player should therefore move the prime forward in good order to his fourth quadrant and thus make room for these blots to re-enter. It is often advantageous to move the prime to the five last points in the fourth quadrant and leave the first point open, as the opponent then may move blots from his first quadrant to that point without passing the prime.

The player must make sure to circulate some of his men, so that they can come up behind the opponent and hit all new blots that are exposed. The player should avoid moving these men to closed points in the prime, but instead place them as blots in front of the prime so that the opponent cannot avoid hitting them. The men must then be re-entered and thereby return to the player's first quadrant, where they start a new round trip.

When the opponent has exposed his seventh blot—or if the home is still closed, his sixth blot—he has taken out his John blot. The player can then John his opponent by hitting all the blots outside the opponent's first quadrant.

== Computer bräde ==
At least two computer bräde adaptations exist.
