= Verquere =

Historical tables game

- Other names: Verkeer, Verkehren, Revertier
- Genres: Board game Dice game Tables game
- Players: 2
- Movement: parallel, anticlockwise
- Chance: Medium (dice rolling)
- Skills: Strategy, tactics, counting, probability
- Related games: Swedish Tables (Bräde)

Verquere is an historical tables game. It was played by two players on a tables board of the same type as used in backgammon, but the direction and rules of play were quite different from that game.

== Names ==
Verquere went under different names in different countries including verkeer in Dutch, Verkehren in German, revertier in French, förkeren in Swedish, forkering in Danish, forkæring in Norwegian and forkæringur in Icelandic.

== History ==
Verquere was probably invented in the Netherlands, and the first written reference is from the end of the 14th century. During the 17th and the 18th century, the game was widely played and very popular in the Netherlands, Germany, and the Nordic countries. It was also known in Great Britain and France, although backgammon and trictrac, respectively, were more common there. During the 19th century, verquere lost in popularity and was eventually eclipsed by other games.

In Sweden and Iceland, verquere became so dominant that the generic terms for tables games—bräde and kotra, respectively—were used interchangeably as synonyms for verquere. The Icelandic variant of the game vanished during the end of the 19th century, and the term kotra in modern Icelandic is used for backgammon. The Swedish variant, on the other hand, maintained its popularity and evolved into the game that now is known as svenskt brädspel (Swedish Tables). Swedish championships are played annually at the Vasa museum in Stockholm.

== Rules ==
The earliest accounts of the rules of verquere are from the beginning of the 18th century, in French, Swedish, and German publications. The first English account is in a book from 1721.

=== The equipment ===
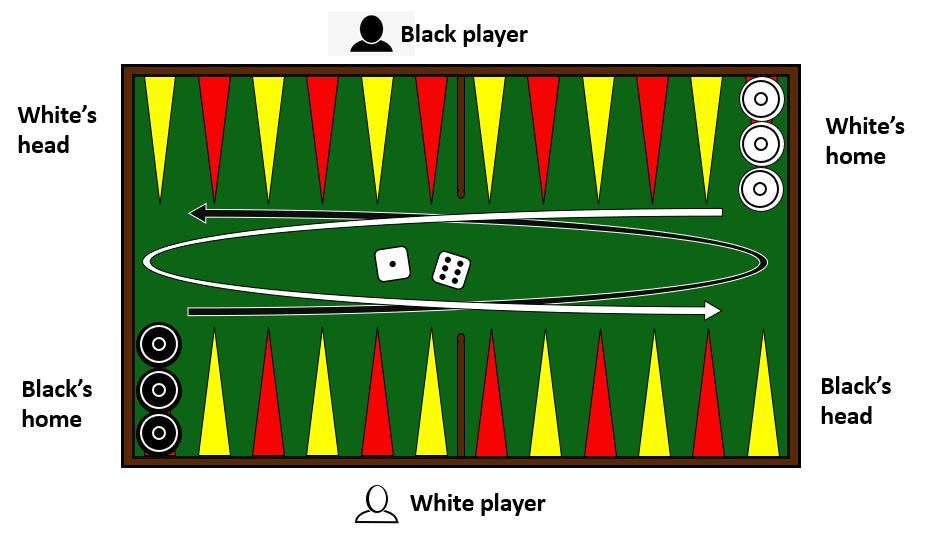
The starting position of the men in Verquere. The direction of movement for the men is indicated with the arrows.

Verquere is played on a rectangular tables board with twelve triangular fields, so called points, along each long side. Each group of six points forms a quarter. One player has fifteen black men and the other player fifteen white men. The players place all fifteen men on the far right point on the opposite side of the board. This point is called the player's home. The main objective of the game is to move the men anticlockwise around the board and be the first to bear the men off.

=== Moving the men ===
The players take turns rolling two dice. A player who, for example, rolls five 5-3 moves one man five points forward and another three points forward. The player may also move the same man eight points forward, but the man must then make a touchdown on either the third or fifth point from the start. If a player cannot move a man for one or both dice, he must give up that part of the roll. If he can move either of the two numbers but not both, he must move the larger one.

If both dice show the same number, the player has rolled a double. Each die in a double counts twice, which means that the player must move four times for the number of eyes shown. If a player cannot move four times, he must move as many times as possible.

=== Hitting men ===
A single man on a point is called a blot. If a player has a blot and one of the opponent's men lands or makes a touchdown on that point, the blot is hit. The player must pick it up from the board—place it on the bar, in modern terminology—and re-enter it in his first quarter.

The man is re-entered on the point in the player's first quarter that has the same number as the number of eyes on the die. A player who, for example, rolls 4-2 may re-enter a man on either the fourth or second point. A player may not re‑enter a man on any point (including his home) already occupied by his own men.

A player may not move any other man on the board as long as he has one or more men on the bar that must be re-entered. If a man is re-entered on a point where the opponent has a blot, the blot is hit and must be re-entered by the opponent.

=== Closed points ===
Two or more men form a closed point, which under normal circumstances is protected. A closed point is called "ein Band" in German and "ett band" in Swedish, which both mean a band or a string in English. The French term is "une case", which means a hut or a box in English. A player may not land, make a touchdown, or re-enter a man on a point that is closed by the opponent.

On the opposite side of the board, the players may only close the point on the far left. That point is called the player's head. On their own side of the board, the players may close any point.

=== Jean and Juncker ===
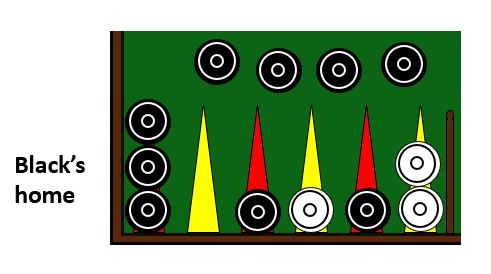
Example: Black player has become Jean. The four men at the top have been sent off the board. Black player can never re-enter more than three of them.

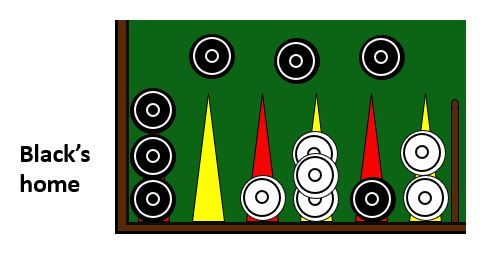
Example: Black player has become Juncker. The three men at the top have been sent off the board. Black can at the moment only re-enter two of them and must therefore pass his turn.

A player may not re-enter men on points where he has men of his own or points that are closed by the opponent. If the number of men on the bar and the number of points that are occupied by the player's own men exceed six, the player can never re-enter all his men. The player has become Jean and loses a double game. The English text says that the player has become John.

If a player has fewer men on the bar than required for Jean but more men than there are empty points and blots of the opponent in his first quarter, the player cannot re-enter all men before the opponent vacates some of his closed points in that quarter. The blocked player has become Juncker. He has not lost the game, but he must pass his turn until the opponent has made enough room for the player to re-enter all men on the bar.

=== Bearing men off ===
A player who has rounded up all his men in his fourth and last quarter may bear the men off to an imaginary twenty-fifth point. If a die shows more eyes than are required to move the backmost man to the twenty-fifth point, the player may still bear it off. However, the player must always use as many of the dice's eyes as possible. If a player, for example, has one man on his second last point and two men on his last point and rolls 2-1, he must bear one man off from each point and leave a blot on the last point. The player may not move the man on the second last point to the last point and then bear it off, as he in the latter case uses two eyes and in the former case three eyes. A player who bears off his last man wins the game.

=== All men on the last point ===
A player who manages to place all his men on the last (twenty-fourth) point does not have to bear the men off, but immediately wins a double game. This rule is not mentioned in the French and the English texts and seems to be a later addition to the game.

=== Five blots and five closed points ===
Before a game, the players could agree to play with "five blots and five closed points". "Five blots" means that the players may not close any point until they have moved five blots from their home. "Five closed points" means that closed points become vulnerable if a player builds a prime with more than five consecutive closed points. If the opponent lands, makes a touchdown, or re-enters a man on a closed point in such a prime, all the men on that point are hit and must be re-entered by the player. These optional rules are not mentioned in the French and English texts.

== Tactics ==
=== Jean ===
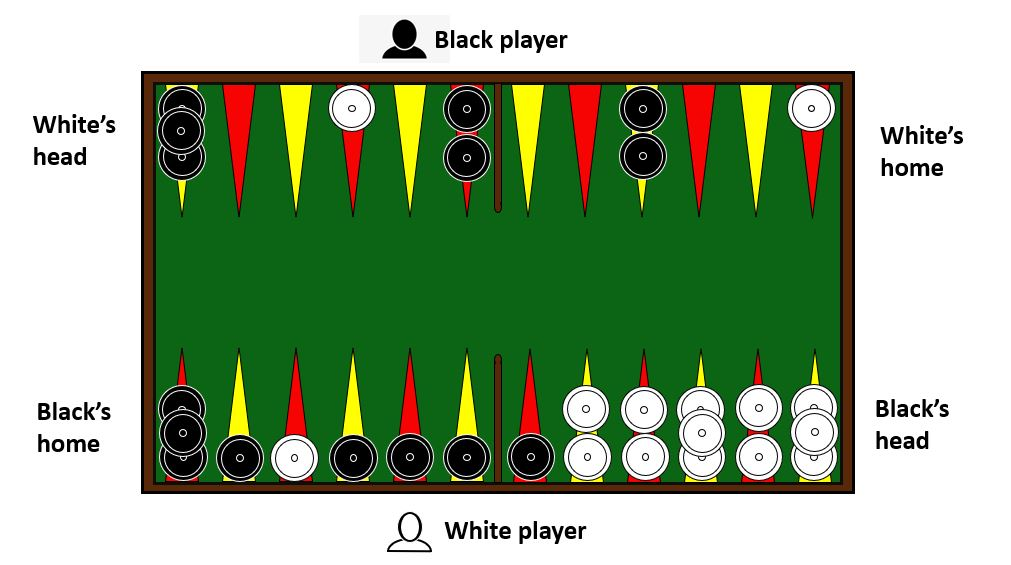
White player is about to make Black player Jean. White has moved his prime to his fourth quarter and has three men behind that can hit Black's blots. It is Black's turn to roll; and if Black doesn't roll a six or a double, he is forced to expose his Jean blot.

A player has the chance to make his opponent Jean, if he gets a head start and manages to build a prime with five or six consecutive closed points in his third and/or fourth quarter (five points only, if the players have agreed to play with "five closed points"). It is then difficult for the opponent to pass the prime, and the opponent is eventually forced to move more men from home or split closed points. The player hits all new blots that the opponent exposes.

The opponent must re-enter all blots that are hit before he can make other moves on the board and expose additional blots. The player should therefore move the prime forward in good order to his fourth quarter and thus make room for these blots to re-enter. It is often advantageous to move the prime to the five last points in the fourth quarter and leave the first point open, as the opponent then may move blots from his first quarter to that point without passing the prime.

The player must make sure to circulate some of his men, so that they can come up behind the opponent and hit all new blots that are exposed. The player should avoid moving these men to closed points in the prime, but instead place them as blots in front of the prime so that the opponent cannot avoid hitting them. The men must then be re-entered and thereby return to the player's first quarter, where they start a new round trip.

When the opponent has exposed his seventh blot—or if the home is still closed, his sixth blot—he has taken out his Jean blot. The player can then make the opponent Jean by hitting all the blots outside the opponent's first quarter.
