= National Marbles Tournament =

Annual children's game tournament in the United States

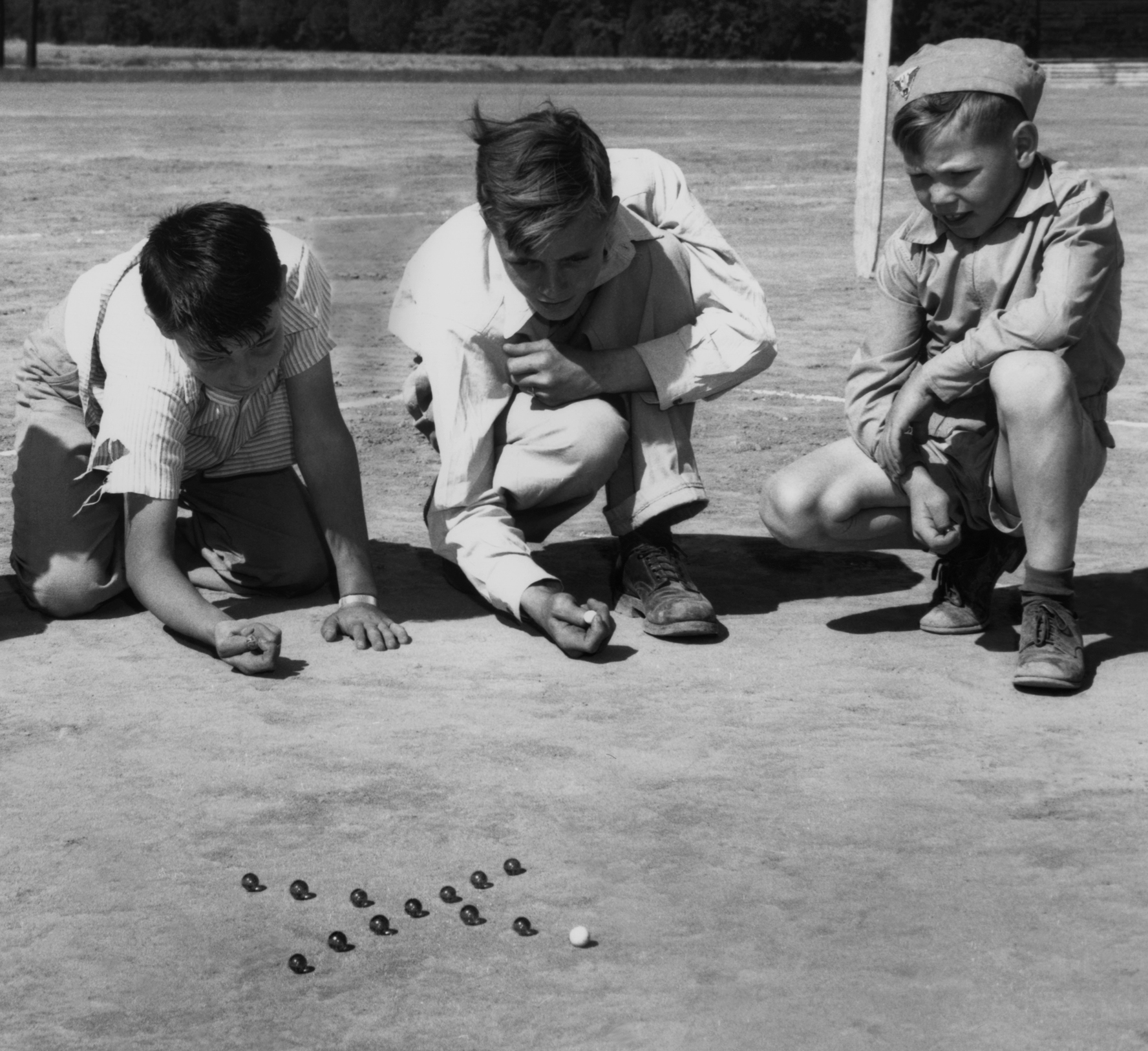
- Marbles in 1945

Tournament information
- Game: "Ringer"
- Location: Wildwood, New Jersey
- Month played: June
- Established: 1923
- Number of tournaments: 100 as of 2026
- Format: tournament

Current champion
- [Boys] Dorian Marlowe (Allegheny County, PA) and [Girls] Cadence Garcia (Philadelphia, PA)

The National Marbles Tournament (NMT) is a United States nationwide marbles tournament for children between 7 and 14 years of age. For most of its history, the NMT has been held annually at "Ringer Stadium" on Wildwood Beach in Wildwood, New Jersey. During separate, simultaneous 4-day marble tournaments for boys and girls, the two national championships are settled.

== History and qualification ==
The National Marbles Tournament is an invitational tournament. To qualify, organizers of marbles tournaments for children conducted in towns, cities, and counties around the United States must apply to the NMT Board for participation. (A long-standing participant, for example, is the Allegheny County, PA Marbles Program.) Local champions of approved tournaments may register for the Nationals.

The first true National Marbles Tournament was held in 1923, following a surge in 1922 of citywide tournaments and intercity challenge bouts between 2 and 4 city champions. Game rules and playing styles had differed from town to town. Several intercity champs and their handlers added chaos and dissention by rushing to claim "nation champion" and even "world champion" status.

Marbles games have deep roots in American folklife. In 1922 marbles were already considered "old-fashioned" game toys for kids, but were still widely popular. Adults were captivated by news of extensive competitions involving their favorite childhood games.

Noting the interest, the Scripps-Howard Newspapers group organized plans for a legitimate nationwide marbles competition to be launched in June 1923. They opened their tournament to all boys and girls of any race or background. They decided on uniform rules for a game called Ringer, and set the age limit to kids under 15. Sponsoring newspapers and parks departments agreed to run local playoffs, then fund travel to, and accommodations at the national finals for their champions and a family escort.

Forty cities around the US, including 8 from Pacific Coast states, sent champions to Atlantic City, New Jersey for the first NMT. All of them traveled by train, some for as long as 4 days and 4 nights. The final match, won by Harlin McCoy of Columbus, Ohio, was watched live at the famous boardwalk by an estimated crowd of 5000 or more.

By 1924, the number of cities participating rose to 54, with some half a million children competing in local marbles tournament play-offs. Represented towns grew to 64 in 1925, and by 1926, over 3 million children were said to have played in early qualifying games.

Atlantic City, New Jersey hosted the NMT until 1928. It moved to Ocean City, New Jersey, which welcomed the event from 1929 to 1936. From 1937 to 1948 the event was held in Wildwood, New Jersey. However, during World War II, the tournament moved safely inland to Cleveland, Ohio (1943 and 1946), and was canceled entirely in 1944 and 1945. A separate girls champion was officially recognized starting in 1948.

In 1949 the tournament moved again, to Asbury Park, New Jersey for 11 years, returning to Wildwood in 1960, where it remains today. In 1976, Great Adventure Park in Jackson, NJ hosted a one-time Bicentennial year run of the NMT.

NMT events history and former champions can be viewed at the National Marbles Hall of Fame in Wildwood. In 2005, many artifacts from the collection were moved and placed on public display at the Greater Wildwood Chamber of Commerce.

== Milestones ==
- 1923: The NMT, based in Atlantic City, NJ, becomes the first US nationwide game tournament for U15 youth. The contest is the only "single elimination" NMT ever run.
- 1924: The NMT is now organized into several regional leagues. During days of preliminary play, each contender competes only with others in his/her assigned league. League leaders advance to the semifinals, and the two with the best records enter the finals for the NMT championship. The first serial adventure story based on the NMT ("Aladdin and His Wonderful Agate") appears in some sponsoring newspapers to promote participation. More serial features appear in later years.
- 1925: The first girl to win a city championship (Marie Lawley, Harrisburg, PA) is the first girl to compete in the NMT. She becomes a tournament celebrity. Atlantic City presents a large statuette/trophy, called "The Marble Shooter," to each contestant (and for several subsequent years, to each semifinalist).
- 1926: The city champion of Honolulu, Hawaii Territory (Francis Kau) steams across the Pacific Ocean and American continent to compete in the NMT, the longest trip to/from the tournament ever made. Kau meets President Calvin Coolidge in Washington, DC en route and demonstrates his marble shooting skills on a West Wing office carpet. On his way home to Kentucky, the 1926 National Champ, Willis "Fatty" Harper, stops in Washington, DC where he's the first National Marbles Champion to meet a US President (Coolidge). The same day at a baseball game between the New York Yankees and Washington Senators, he meets all-stars Babe Ruth and Walter Johnson.
- 1929: The NMT base moves to Ocean City, NJ, beating several other locations bidding for host-city honors. The finals are broadcast live to a nationwide radio audience for the first time. Famous national play-by-play announcer Graham McNamee says the tournament gave him "just about the biggest thrill of my career."
- 1930: A rare prize for the National Champion is an international trip. Jimmy Lee (Columbus, OH) cruises from New York City to Los Angeles via the Panama Canal. He plays marbles with Latin American kids en route as a proxy ambassador for the NMT.
- 1931: A rule change allows a player who knocks a marble out of the ring to continue shooting only if that player's shooter stays in the ring. Previously, if a shooter left the ring after a successful shot, that player could continue shooting. This makes the skill of "sticking" in the ring far more important. For the first time, a Canadian champion (Simon Wittenberg, Pt. Colborne, Ontario) takes part in the NMT. His sponsor, The Buffalo (NY) Times, starts calling the NMT the "International Marbles Tournament."
- 1931-32: Kentucky is the first state to be the home of back-to-back NMT Champions.
- 1933: In another big rule change, the "kill rule" is ended. Previously, if a player's shooter stopped in the ring without knocking a target marble out of the ring, it had to remain in place. An opponent could try to knock the sitting shooter out of the ring, "killing" the opposing player and immediately winning that game. Growing popularity and Depression-era expenses introduce separate Eastern and Western National playoff sectionals. The Western Region champ (held at Chicago's Soldier Field during the "Century of Progress" World's Fair) is flown to Ocean City to play a finals match against the Eastern Region champ.
- 1934: Still growing, NMT playoffs expand again to three regional playoff sectionals. Sectional champs are always brought to the New Jersey shore for final matches. In subsequent years before World War II, playoff regions keep increasing and sectional host city locations change frequently.
- 1937: The NMT base moves again, to Wildwood, NJ.
- 1938: 1937 National Champion Bill Kloss (Canton, OH) is featured in the famous Life magazine.
- 1940: National playoffs expand to 6 sectional tournaments, played out in five locations. Wildwood introduces new marble rings for use in the Nationals, replacing the old ones made of pressed and smoothed sand, dirt, and clay. The new surface material is Monocork, a mix of cork and rubber that pours like concrete and hardens, repelling rain.
- 1941: At least 147 local champions (including 9 girls) participate in National playoffs, the most ever in all of NMT history.
- 1943: Due to World War II restrictions, the NMT moves inland to Cleveland in 1943 and 1946, and sees significantly lower participation. In those contests, brothers Richard and Raymond Ryabik (Pittsburgh, PA) are the first pair of siblings to become National Marbles Champions.
- 1944 and 1945: The NMT is canceled.
- 1947: Resuming play in Wildwood, the NMT finals are featured in two leading national magazines: Life and Time.
- 1948: A separate girls champion is officially recognized. Most years since 1925, one or more local girl champs had competed at the Nationals with the boy champs. This year, the 5 girl contenders are placed in the same league with a few boys. The girl with the best playoffs record (Jean Smedley, Philadelphia, PA) becomes the first recognized Girls National Marbles Champion. (Jean had also earned the best girls record in 1947 and was named the girls champ, but not crowned.)
- 1949: The NMT base moves again, to Asbury Park, NJ.
- 1950: National Champion Bob Retzlaff (Montgomery, AL) wins another international trip, to France. He travels with Southern Regional Director, Oka Hester (Greensboro, NC). They promote the NMT in Paris, and learn about French versions of the game ("billes"). But efforts to recruit European participants to the NMT fail.
- 1953: For the first time, 5 girl contenders are assigned to an all-girls league, no long competing with boys in league playoffs. This guarantees that the Girls' National Champion will advance to the overall National semifinals along with other league leaders (boys).
- 1955: Sports Illustrated, launched by Time, Inc. a year earlier, runs an article on marbles, hinting that the future of the game and tournament look dim. SI prints many more reports on the NMT for decades. National Champion Raymond Jones Jr. (Pittsburgh, PA) wins an international trip, to Jamaica, traveling with his coach.
- 1958: When the tournament ends, its longest-serving director, Ralph E. Shurtleff (Assistant to the Editor, Cleveland Press), turns NMT leadership over to Oka Hester (Director of Greensboro, NC Parks & Recreation). Scripps Newspapers end their NMT sponsorship, focusing its youth outreach on the growing National Spelling Bee.
- 1959: The "Best Sport" Award becomes an annual tradition. From 1971 on, both boys' and girls' Best Sports are chosen each year.
- 1960: The NMT base returns to Wildwood, NJ, which has continued to host the contest ever since. The girls tournament is fully separated from the boys tournament. The Girls National Champion no longer competes for an overall National Championship. (Girls had never reached the overall finals in mixed tournament play.) For the first time, the boys and girls national champs come from the same local program (Yonkers, NY). Tommy Meade and Christine Zamojski are crowned the NMT King and Queen.
- 1961: For the first time, a finals match is fought between champs from the same local program (Yonkers, NY). Ace Millen beats Tom Senita for the crown.
- 1963: Dividing contenders into leagues ends. Using a round-robin format, each participant (boys and girls separately) now plays every other one during preliminary games. In the boys tournament, the 8 top players compete in 2 semifinal divisions. The 2 semifinal division winners play in the finals. With fewer contenders, the Girls National Champion is decided by her top standing in the preliminary games. A "stick" is a game won by shooting 7 consecutive marbles out of the ring in the first inning of play, an immediate win. This year, the 37 boy contenders win a remarkable total of 282 games by sticks in preliminary play, the most ever. The top 8 win 149 of those preliminary games by sticks.
- 1967: Mr. and Mrs. Roger Howdyshell, owners of Marble King, Inc., attend their first National Marbles Tournament. They and their company soon become long-term supporters of the NMT.
- 1973: For the first time, girls' semifinals and finals are added following preliminary games.
- 1974: An all-time individual record number and percent of "sticks" during preliminary games is set by Paul McKeone (Reading, PA). He wins 32 games by sticks (tying the 1969 record of Ray Morgano (Pittsburgh, PA). McKeone's sticks are in 53% of his 60 games. Morgano's are in 50% of his 64 games.
- 1980: The youngest ever NMT Champion is Brenda Schwartz (age 9, Pottstown, PA).
- 1988: The scholarship prize for NMT Champions, started in 1968 by Marble King, Inc., is boosted from $500 to $2000 with help from Creative Athletics Products, Inc., a marbles game manufacturer.
- 1989: For the first time, more girls than boys are entered in their respective tournaments. Similar numbers of boys and girls had been participating since the mid-1980s.
- 1993: The National Marbles Hall of Fame opens at the George F. Boyer Historical Museum, Wildwood, NJ.
- 1996: The first "perfect" record in preliminary games (31–0) is won by Nathan Thompson (Monroe County, KY). Nathan is also the first NMT Champion to win following 3 years as a National Runner-up.
- 2009: For the first time, a child (Whitney Lapic, Berks County, PA) of a past NMT champion (1973 - Debra Stanley, Reading, PA) wins a NMT.
- 2020 and 2021: The NMT is canceled (COVID-19 pandemic).
- 2023: The 100th Anniversary of the National Marbles Tournament (the 97th run of the tournament) is celebrated.

== Game ==
Marble shooters (players) are known as 'mibsters.' In the NMT, they not only compete for national honors, but for college scholarships, trophies, and other prizes and awards. Over 1,200 games of marbles are played in the event.

=== Rules ===
Each player must use a shooter, in size, not more than ¾" in diameter and not less than ½" in diameter, and should be made from glass or stone. The shooter size will be confirmed before play commences. Thirteen standard glass 5/8" marbles (all identical), are used as target marbles, and placed in the centre of the ring in an 'X' shape, with one target marble in the centre, and three on each leg spaced three inches apart. Players should maintain foot contact with the wood border for each shot. Players can shoot, lob underhand, or roll their shooter, and try to shoot out the most marbles before the last inning is over to win. Or any player who shoots out seven marbles is the winner.

== U.S. National Marbles Tournament Champions ==
Reference for Boys Champions: Reference for Girls Champions:

Year	Boys Champion	Girls Champion
[1922]	[These boys were 1922 city marbles champs who also won separate 'intercity' bouts. Afterwards, all of them arbitrarily declared themselves 'national' and/or 'world' champions.]: Charles 'Buster' Rech (Jersey City, NJ) Frank 'Bud' McQuade Jr (Baltimore, MD) Francis Dinkey (West New York, NJ)	-
1923	Harlin McCoy (Columbus, OH)	-
1924	George Lenox (Baltimore, MD)	-
1925	Howard 'Dutch' Robbins (Springfield, MA)	-
1926	Willis 'Fatty' Harper (Bevier, KY)	-
1927	Joe Medvidovich (Pittsburgh, PA)	-
1928	Alfred Huey (Akron, OH)	-
1929	Charles 'Sonny' Albany (Philadelphia, PA)	-
1930	James Lee (Columbus, OH)	-
1931	John Jeffries (Greenville, KY)	-
1932	Harley 'Shorty' Corum (Louisville, KY)	-
1933	Aaron Butash (Throop, PA)	-
1934	Clifton Seaver (Springfield, MA)	-
1935	Henry Altyn (Throop, PA)	-
1936	Leonard Tyner (Chicago, IL)	-
1937	William Kloss (Canton, OH)	-
1938	Frank Santo (Throop, PA)	-
1939	Harry DeBoard (Landenburg, PA)	-
1940	James Music (Huntington, WV)	-
1941	Gerald 'Chick' Robinson (Scranton, PA)	-
1942	Charles Mott (Huntington, WV)	-
1943	Richard 'Butch' Ryabik (Pittsburgh, PA)	-
1944	No tournament - World War II
1945	No tournament - World War II
1946	Raymond Ryabik (Pittsburgh, PA)	-
1947	Benjamin 'Buddy' Sklar (Pittsburgh, PA)	-
1948	Herbert Turman (Beloit, WI)	Jean Smedley (Philadelphia, PA)
1949	George Wentz (Huntington, WV)	Emma Miller (Canton, OH)
1950	Bob Retzlaff (Montgomery, AL)	Kay Allen (Greensboro, NC)
1951	Shirley Allen (Beckley, WV)	Ida Jean Hopkins (Cleveland, OH)
1952	Russell Gwaltney (Salem, VA)	Dorothy Hobbs (Augusta, GA)
1953	Jerry Roy (Huntington, WV)	Arlene Riddette (Yonkers, NY)
1954	Bob Hickman (Huntington, WV)	Wanita Kucher (Philadelphia, PA)
1955	Raymond Jones (Pittsburgh, PA)	Karen Olson (Niles, OH)
1956	Fred Brown (Beckley, WV)	Lynette Watkins (Philadelphia, PA)
1957	Stanley Herold (Summersville, WV)	Lois Fusco (Yonkers, NY)
1958	Dennis Kyle (Richwood, WV)	Jeannette Merlino (Yonkers, NY)
1959	Matthew Wysocki (Wilkes-Barre, PA)	Sandra Stefanchik (Yonkers, NY)
1960	Tommy Meade (Yonkers, NY)	Christine Zamojski (Yonkers, NY)
1961	Ace Millen (Yonkers, NY)	Anita Danyluk (Niles, OH)
1962	Mark O'Mahoney (Pittsburgh, PA)	Peggy Mullen (Pittsburgh, PA)
1963	James Donohue (Springfield, MA)	Patsy Coon (Philadelphia, PA)
1964	Clarence 'Peewee' Bower (Mullens, WV)	Claudia Davis (Yonkers, NY)
1965	Garry Malcom (Elkhart, IN)	Jacqueline Izaj (Pittsburgh, PA)
1966	Melvin Garland (Pittsburgh, PA)	Marcella Elliott (Wilmington, DE)
1967	Barry Blum (York, PA)	Patricia Yurkovich (Pittsburgh, PA)
1968	Rudy Raymond (Reading, PA)	Debbie Webb (Yonkers, NY)
1969	Glenn Sigmon (Wharton, WV)	Maureen Regan (Lawrenceville, PA)
1970	Ray Morgano (Pittsburgh, PA)	Karen Yurkovich (Pittsburgh, PA)
1971	Rick Mawhinney (Cumberland, MD)	Cheryl Elliott (Wilmington, DE)
1972	Ray Jarrell (Whitesville, WV)	Kathy Pazkowski (Pittsburgh, PA)
1973	Doug Hager (Whitesville, WV)	Debra Stanley (Reading, PA)
1974	Larry Kokos (Pittsburgh, PA)	Susan Regan (Pittsburgh, PA)
1975	Richard Unser (Pittsburgh, PA)	Sharon Woolworth (Reading, PA)
1976	Jeff Rice (Cumberland, MD)	Judy Bosiljevak (Allegheny County, PA)
1977	Walt Morgano (Lawrenceville, PA)	Dianne Kopicki (Reading, PA)
1978	Dean Feinauer (Reading, PA)	Diane Bertosh (Lawrenceville, PA)
1979	Danny Stamm (Reading, PA)	Kris Alfiero (Reading, PA)
1980	Sandy Nesmith (Arnett, WV)	Brenda Schwartz (Pottstown, PA)
1981	Jeff Kimmell (Cumberland, MD)	Joelle Guiles (Reading, PA)
1982	Mike Moore (Cumberland, MD)	Lisa Stamm (Reading, PA)
1983	Kerry Acord (Arnett, WV)	Patricia Kimmel (Cumberland, MD
1984	Gregg Yakich (Pittsburgh, PA)	Nicole Stamm (Reading, PA)
1985	Jon Jamison (Reading, PA)	Amy Thompson (Cumberland, MD)
1986	Giang Duong (Upper Darby, PA)	Darlene Schwartz (Berks County, PA)
1987	Chad Reber (Berks County, PA)	Lori Dickel (Ridgeley, WV)
1988	Dan Strohecker (Reading, PA)	Shannon Capasso (Pittsburgh, PA)
1989	Nicky Piatek (Pittsburgh, PA)	Donna Rothenberger (Reading, PA)
1990	Carl Whitacre (Ridgeley, WV)	Alison Reber (Oley, PA)
1991	Brian Shollenberger (Reading, PA)	Dawn Lancaster (Cumberland, MD)
1992	Wesley Thompson (Standing Stone, TN)	Trish Tressler (Frederick County, MD)
1993	David McGee (Pittsburgh, PA)	Amanda Burns (Clay County, TN)
1994	Bong Duong (Upper Darby, PA)	Kim Shuttleworth (Allegheny County, PA)
1995	Jason Williams (Clarksburg, WV)	Stephanie Zlokas (Pittsburgh, PA)
1996	Nathan Thompson (Monroe County, KY)	Molly Reecer (Celina, TN)
1997	Michael Thomas (Upper Darby, PA)	Megan Winkelman (Frederick County, MD)
1998	Ben Nelson (Middletown, MD)	Emily Martin (Frederick County, MD)
1999	Doug Watson (Greencastle, PA)	Kathy Stehlik (Perry Hall, MD)
2000	Andrew Martinez (Grand Junction, CO)	Larin Miller (Pittsburgh, PA)
2001	Tim Ratliff (Washington Co., MD)	Kristie Vanderzee
2002	Jonathan Hulse (Washington Co., MD)	Morgan Kellman (Middletown, MD)
2003	Jeremy Hulse (Hagerstown, MD)	Jennifer Pinciotti (Frederick County, MD)
2004	Aaron Nees (Mesa County, CO)	Carly Miller (Allegheny County, PA)
2005	Jamie Miller (Allegheny County, PA)	Amy Nees (Mesa County, CO)
2006	Keith Moss (Allegheny County, PA)	Melissa Ashwood (Gunnison, CO)
2007	Nick Anderson (Mesa County, CO)	Alexandra Bauer (Pittsburgh, PA)
2008	John Laffakis (Pittsburgh, PA)	Amber Ricci (Pittsburgh, PA)
2009	Ricky Brode (Cumberland, MD)	Whitney Lapic (Shillington, PA)
2010	Corey Goolsby (Standing Stone, TN)	Penelope Bauer (Pittsburgh, PA)
2011	Brandon Matchett (Allegheny County, PA)	Bailey Narr (Allegheny County, PA)
2012	Caleb Isaacson (Gunnison, CO)	Logan Mayberry (Clay County, TN)
2013	Cooper Fischer (Middletown, MD)	Emily Cavacini (Allegheny County, PA)
2014	Dominic Rudakevych (Middletown, MD)	Marilyn Fischer (Middletown Valley, MD)
2015	Devon Loewendick (Cumberland, MD)	Emily Simkovich (Lansdowne, PA)
2016	Louie Lee (Mesa County, CO)	Haley Grenesko (Pittsburgh, PA)
2017	Eli Murphy (Allegheny County, PA)	Sierra Ricci (Allegheny County, PA)
2018	Joshua Johnston (Ambler, PA)	Madison Johnson (Allegheny County, PA)
2019	Spencer Hays (Gunnison, CO)	Lauren Young (Frederick County, MD)
2020	No tournament - COVID-19
2021	No tournament - COVID-19
2022	Todd Kmiecik (Middletown, MD)	Jessica Johnson (Cape May County, NJ)
2023	Isaiah Garcia (Philadelphia, PA)	Jessica Thompson (Middletown Valley, MD)
2024	Myles Lacy (Clay County, TN)	Katelynn Gaumer (Cumberland, MD)
2025	Vincent Ruiz (Standing Stone, TN)	Elise Peterson (Allegheny County, PA)
2026	Dorian Marlowe (Allegheny County, PA)	Cadence Garcia (Philadelphia, PA)

== Other marble tournaments ==
- British and World Marbles Championship
- US Marbles Championship
- National Rolley Hole Marbles Championships
