= Art marble =

Art marbles are high quality collectible marbles arising out of the art glass movement. They are sometimes referred to as contemporary glass marbles to differentiate them from collectible antique marbles, and are spherical works of art glass. Glass artists interest in marbles at the end of the twentieth century brought about a resurgence in hand made marbles.

== Types ==
Dichroic glass is a very popular choice with glass artists today, especially so when creating marbles, because of its properties of having more than one color and when viewed from different angles, has a sparkle effect, much like a cut gemstone. Dichroic glass is actually a product created by the space industry, and was first used as an interference filter for precise scientific measuring. To create this effect, glass artists use a thin layer of metallic oxides including magnesium, silicon and titanium at high temperatures. This style of marble was invented by Geoffrey Beetem circa 1989 and are called Stardust Marbles. First publication was by Marilyn Barrett in 1994, Dr. Morito 1996, Glass magazine in 2000, and in Marbles and Related Art Glass, by Mark P. Block also in 2000.

Vortex marbles are a very popular style created by forming a cone at the end of a rod of clear glass, typically borosilicate or scientific glass. Various patterns are created on the outside of this cone, a spiral being the most popular. This is encased to create a hemisphere. More patterns are usually added to the outside. The opposite side is turned into a lens and the entire piece is shaped into a sphere. This style was created by Kevin O'Grady circa 1994. O'Grady is a pioneer in the contemporary glass marble movement.

== Artists ==
Contemporary marble artists include Josh Simpson, Aaron Slater, Gateson Reko, Travis Webber
