= Tock =

Board game

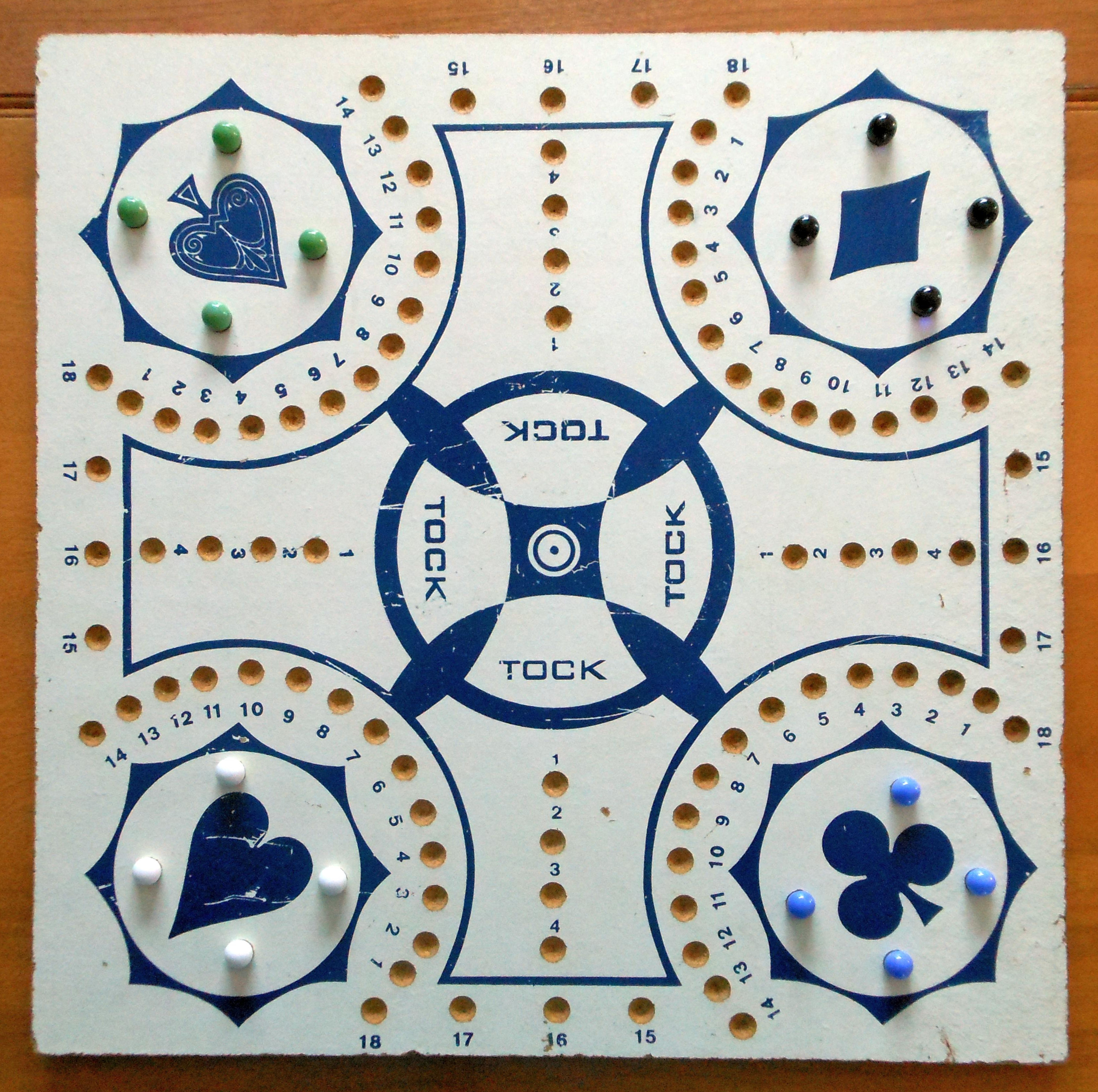
A traditional Tock board

Tock (also known as Tuck in some English parts of Quebec and Atlantic Canada, and Pock in some parts of Alberta) is a board game, similar to Ludo, Aggravation or Sorry!, in which players race their four tokens (or marbles) around the game board from start to finish—the objective being to be the first to take all of one's tokens "home". Like Sorry!, it is played with playing cards rather than dice.

== Overview ==
Tock is a Cross and Circle game in the style of Pachisi, an Indian game played since the first millennium BC. Tock's exact origins are unclear, but traditionally it is believed that it originated with the early settlers of Quebec, Canada.

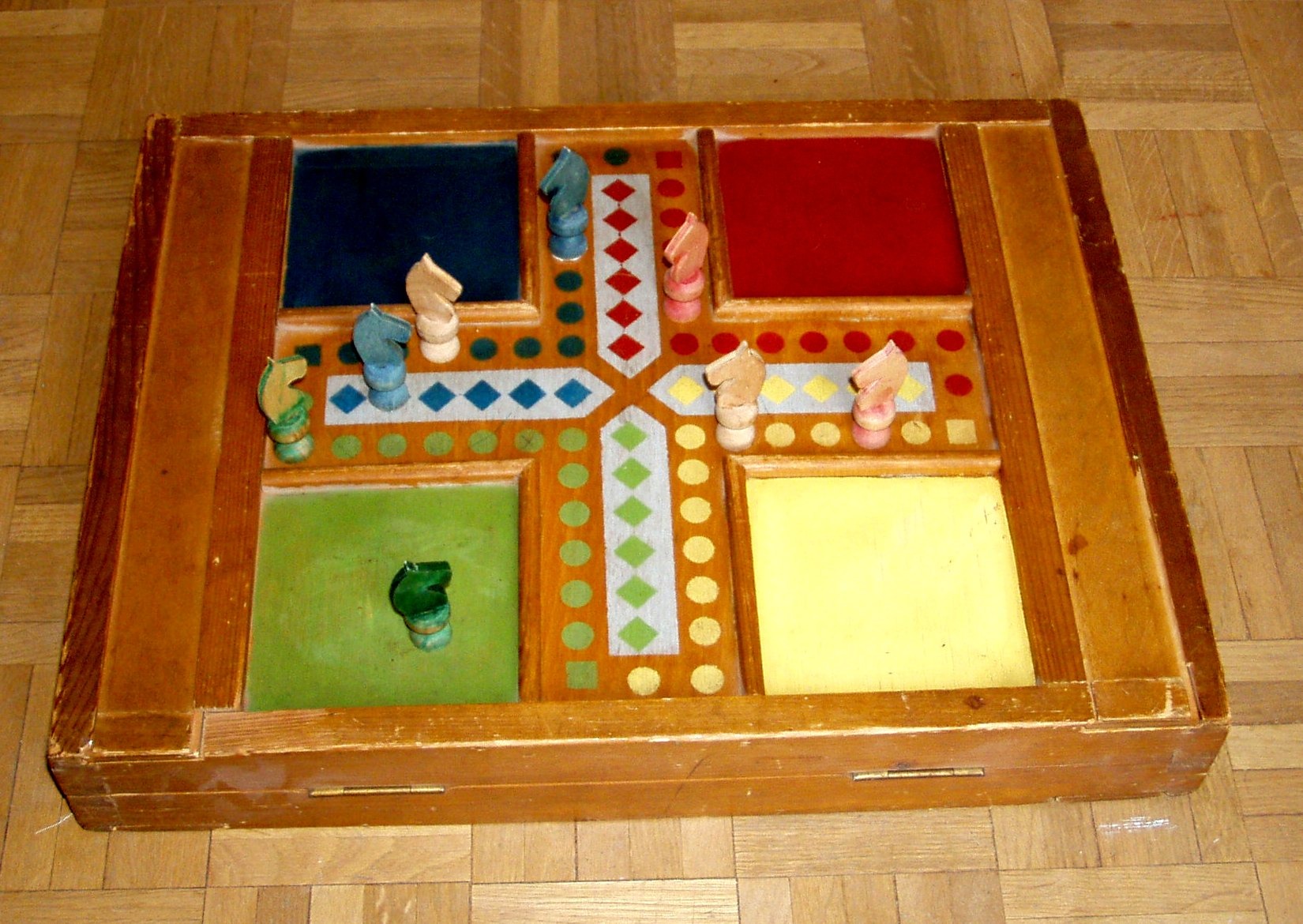
The French game of Petits-Chevaux ("little horses")

From Quebec, the game Jeu du Toc (or Tock) moved to France where it is also known as Jeu des petits chevaux canadiens. Tock is also similar to the French game Jeu des petits chevaux, where moves are determined by throwing dice instead of playing cards.

From Vermont, the game TUK migrated down from Quebec is also known as TUC rules of play are similar to TOCK. Specialty cards vary from town to town, household to household. Square boards with a border of 80 holes numbered 1-20 ending at "home" with an additional 4 holes per player. Playing pieces are either golf tees or cribbage pegs depending on the size of the board.

== Rules ==
At the beginning of each round players are dealt a number of cards which they play in turns to move their tokens around the board. If at any time a token lands exactly on the field occupied by another token then the moved token replaces the resting one (which is placed back into the corresponding player's starting area). If a player on their turn has no cards they can play with their tokens (or which they can't play against the other players, like a 5, 10 or Queen in some variations) then they must discard their entire remaining hand and wait for the next hand to be dealt. The discarded cards may not be looked through by other players.

A starter is a card that allows a player to move a new token to the starting field. Aces and Kings (and Jokers in some variations) are starters.

A token at the starting field is immune to capture or swapping by an opponent, and additionally it creates a blockade. No players can pass a token that is on its starting field, either forward or backwards (with a 4) with the exception of a Joker.

In the simplest form of the game, the cards only provide a single specific number of fields to move forward. However, Tock has many (even more popular) variations where some cards have special functions, that make the game more challenging and interesting.

Any combination of card functions can be used in play. Just ensure every player is aware of all the options to be used in play prior to the game.

To make it "home", a player needs the exact count of fields, and they need to fill the house from the top down. Tokens are not allowed to jump over other tokens within the house.

=== Card functions ===
The basic functions of cards are:

Ace
Can be used as 1, or as a starter.
Jack
Make a move of 11 fields or may swap one of their own tokens with any other token (opponent's or their own) on the circle track.
Queen
Makes a move of 12 fields.
King
Can be used to move 13 fields after all tokens are out, or as a starter.

The following are also commonly used:

4
Move four fields backward. Players are allowed to go backward from their starting point and then into Home on a subsequent turn. But moving backward straight into Home is not allowed.
7
Make 7 individual moves of one field. These moves can be freely distributed among all of his tokens. These moves can destroy everything in the player's path.

=== Variants ===
==== Saskatchewan variant ====
Typically played in Team format, with partners opposite each other on the board. A player must have all their tokens in their home space before playing on their partners tokens (with the exception of the Jack)

Cards are dealt 5 per player for the first hand, 4 for the remaining hands until the deck is complete.

Ace
Can be used as 1, or as a starter.
4
Move four spaces backward ONLY (can not go forwards). Players are allowed to go backwards from their starting point and then into Home on a subsequent turn. But moving backwards straight into Home is not allowed.
7
Make 7 up to individual moves of one space. These moves can be freely distributed among all of his tokens. The tokens of any opponent that paths are crossed with are sent back to their players starting space (not partner tokens in partner play)
Jack
May swap any 2 tokens on the board that are not on their home or starting space. Moving 11 spaces is not permitted under these rules.
Queen
Makes a move of 12 fields.
King
Can be used to move 13 spaces or as a starter.
Joker
Can be used to move 15 fields or as a starter, AND receives another card

All other cards are played at their face value and must be used completely by a single token.

If a player has a playable card they must play it (i.e. they can not burn a card instead of playing another even if the result is detrimental), with the exception of the Jack.

==== Cape Breton variant ====
Ace
Can be used as 1, or as a starter.
4
Move four spaces backward ONLY (can not go forwards). Players are allowed to go backwards from their starting point and then into Home on a subsequent turn. But moving backwards straight into Home is not allowed.
7
Make 7 individual moves of one space. These moves can be freely distributed among all of their tokens. The tokens of any opponent that paths are crossed with are sent back to their players starting space (INCLUDING partner tokens in partner play). If a 7 is used from the starting position, completely on a single token, the player also has the option of moving to the opposite 7 (the 7 across the board), including removing any tokens in its way between the starting position and 7 position on their own side.
Jack
May swap any 2 tokens on the board that are not on their home or starting space. Or moving 11 spaces is permitted under these rules.
Queen
Makes a move of 12 fields.
King
Can be used to move 13 spaces or as a starter.
Joker
Can be used to move 25 fields or as a starter, AND receives another card

All other cards are played at their face value and must be used completely by a single token.

==== Vermont variant ====
Dealer is chosen cutting a low card, first card dealt goes to the dealer and the dealer deals to the left. 5 cards first and when playing teams. Dealer plays first and the game goes to the left. After the first five cards are played, dealer deals four until the deck is exhausted leaving the dealer with 6 cards, 2 of which (dealer's choice) must be discarded. For two players, each will get two sets of 5 with a discard; and for three players, each will get two sets of five with no discard. Ace is used as a 1 or a starter. 4 moves four spaces backwards 7 moves seven spaces or any combination adding up to 7. These moves can be freely distributed among all of the player's tokens, but must be used in its entirety. Any token passed is sent back to its starting space (INCLUDING partner tokens in partner play). If moving one's last token home, any unplayed portion of the seven is played for one's partner. Jack moves 11 or swap any player but one's own. Queen moves 12 (Virginia derivation: if drawn while in one's own quadrant, token moves to the 20 space in one's quadrant and sends all tokens passed to their starting spaces.) King moves 13 or is a starter. Joker moves 25 or is a starter. All other cards are played at their face value and must be used completely used by a single token. Home must be filled from the top down (no jumping or passing), is protected from other players, and once in home, a four cannot be used to leave home. Once home is filled with all the player's tokens, that player's cards are then played for the partner's tokens.

==== Team variants ====
Aside from a "Free for all" play style the game also supports a variety of team based modes. Common to all team based variations is that once a team member has managed to bring all of their tokens home they help move their partners' tokens. If the first player to get all marbles home plays a seven, the remainder can be used to move the partner’s marbles. Also after every hand is dealt the team members exchange one card with each other.

- Two versus two players standard - Players on opposite sides of the board team up.
- Three versus three players - On a six player board the teams' players are placed in alternating order around the board. Each team member exchanges card with every other team member when a new hand is dealt.
- Two versus two players extended - On a six player board each team will receive an additional common color of tokens. The teams are placed like in a 3 vs 3 game. Each player may move with their own or the common color.
- Two vs. Two vs. Two players - Players on opposite sides of the board team up. This variant is more "cutthroat" than the other team based variants because there are more hostile turns than friendly turns in every round.
- Three vs Three with captains - Players on opposite sides of the board team up, along with a captain, on a 4 player board. The non-captains play their own pieces, while the captain can play either of their teammate's pieces. Should a teammate complete, they then join the captain to play the remaining teammate’s pieces.

==== Other variations ====
Some versions of the game use pawns or "men" as tokens; other versions use marbles instead, which advance on a wooden board with circular indentations in it to hold the marbles. While the game is designed on the basis of a French deck of cards with jokers removed; there are some versions that do use the jokers (54-Cards Game), or that come with cards specially made for the game that depict the actions they allow.
