= Martin Frederick Christensen =

Danish inventor and businessman

- Born: 26 March 1849; Copenhagen, Denmark
- Died: 10 October 1915 (aged 66); Akron, Ohio
- Occupation: Inventor, businessman
- Children: 2, Charles Frederick Christensen and Jessie Christensen

Martin Frederick Christensen (26 March 1849 – 10 October 1915) was a Danish inventor and businessman. He is most known as the inventor of an automated machine that could manufacture glass marbles and founder of M.F. Christensen and Son Company.

== Early life ==
Martin F Christensen was born in Denmark on 26 March 1849. He immigrated to the United States in 1867 at the age of 18. After his arrival in America, he began working in the drop-forge steel industry making various items such as tools and knives. In 1880, he settled in Akron, Ohio with his wife Catherine.

=== Family ===
Little is known about Martin's family. He had a wife, Catherine, and two children, Jessie and Charles. Martin eventually went into business with his son when he started the Martin F. Christensen and Son Company.

== Inventions ==
The first page of the patent for Martin F. Christensen's Marble Machine.

=== The Christensen Ball Rolling Machine ===
At age 50, Martin invented a machine that created spherical metal ball-bearings. He applied for a patent on 7 March 1899 and the patent was published on 5 September 1899. The machine is called an "apparatus for making small metallic spheres" in U.S. Patent No. 632336. He quickly sold 80% of the patent for $25,000, and retained the last 20% to be able to collect royalty payments. This machine, referred to as "The Christensen Ball Rolling Machine", proved unsuccessful due to many engineering and mechanical flaws.

=== The Marble Machine ===
On 19 December 1902, Martin F. Christensen filed U.S. Patent No. 802495A, for a machine that made spherical bodies or balls. The patent was published on 24 October 1905. The first machine-made marbles were created in a barn behind Christensen's house, which led to a manufacturing facility. This machine could only round one marble at a time.

== M.F. Christensen and Son Company ==
In 1903, Christensen and his 25-year-old son, Charles Frederick, established the M.F. Christensen and Son Company in Akron. Harry Heinzelman, who had worked for the Navarre Glass Marble and Specialty Company, was hired as the company's glass master. Heinzelman was paid 70 cents per 1000 marbles, which was 20 cents more than the average worker for similar performance at that time. By 1910, up to 10,000 marbles were being rolled per day by 33 employees. Each employee, working 10 hours per day, would make $5 for the day as a result. This was considered a good wage for the day.

An early flyer/advertisement for the M.F. Christensen and Son Company.

With the success of Christensen's invention and manufacturing facility, focus shifted from (Germany) to the United States with regard to marble manufacturing. During this time, the entry of America into World War I halted the import of German-manufactured products, and likely contributed to the success of the company. By 1914, M.F. Christensen and Son was making 1 million marbles per month. 1916 was a very good year for production yields and 1917 looked just as promising before the United Started joined World War I.

=== Decline of the company ===
Due to two unseasonably cold winters and much of the supply of natural gas supply being diverted to the war effort of the time, the company was forced to temporarily turn off furnaces and let employees go. Several employees chose to stay on as there was enough stock and supplies to continue fulfilling orders for another 18 months. When supplies finally ran dry, the company closed its doors again. M.F. Christensen would not live long enough to see the full collapse of his company, as he died in 1915. His son Charles, would take over control of the company. Instead of being forced to relocate the company to an area with greater access to natural gas like West Virginia, Charles chose to close the company permanently and stay close to family.

== Death ==
Christensen died on 10 October 1915 of natural causes while attending dinner with his family. His son, Charles, assumed responsibility for the company.
