= Marble (toy) =

Small spherical toy

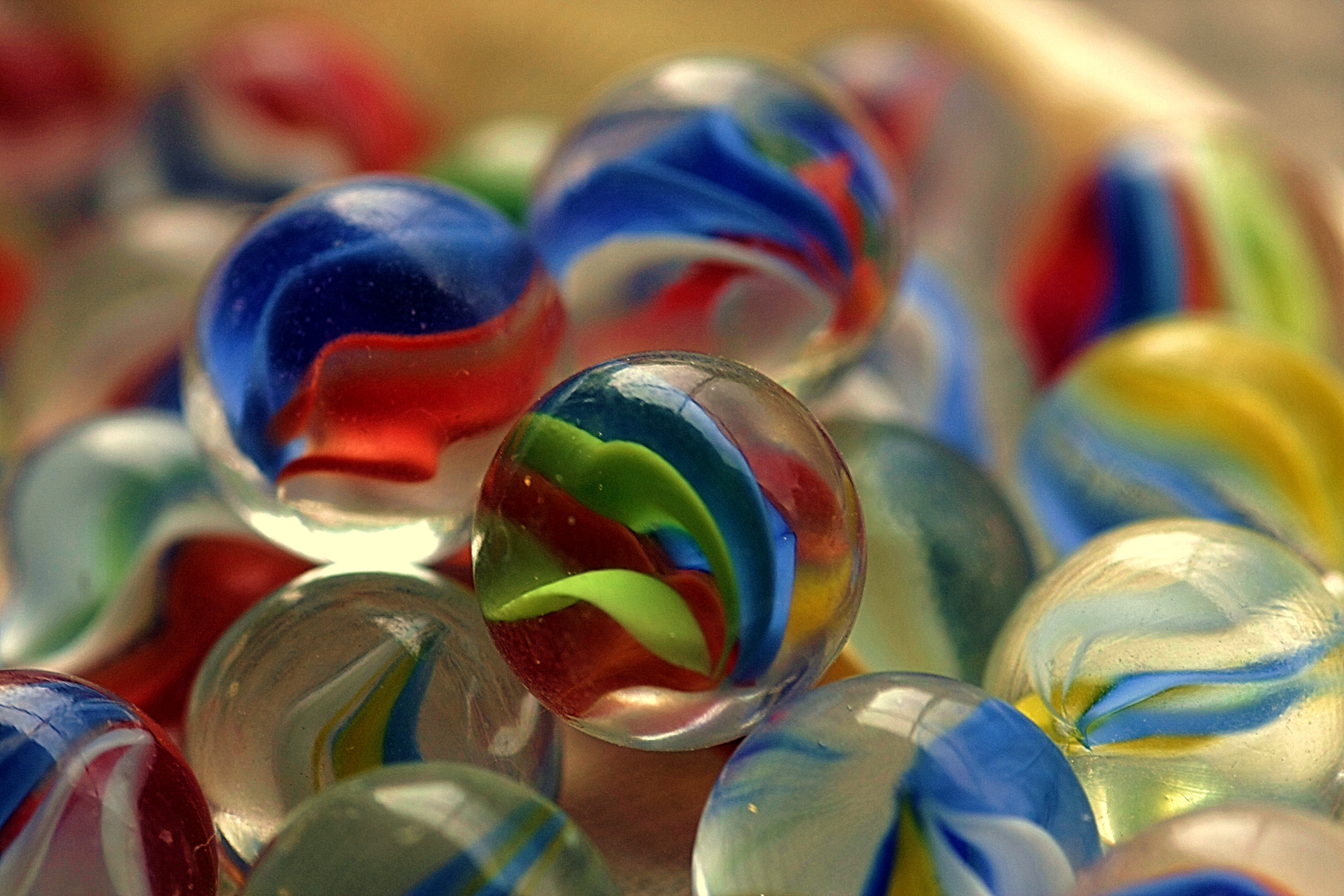
Glass marbles

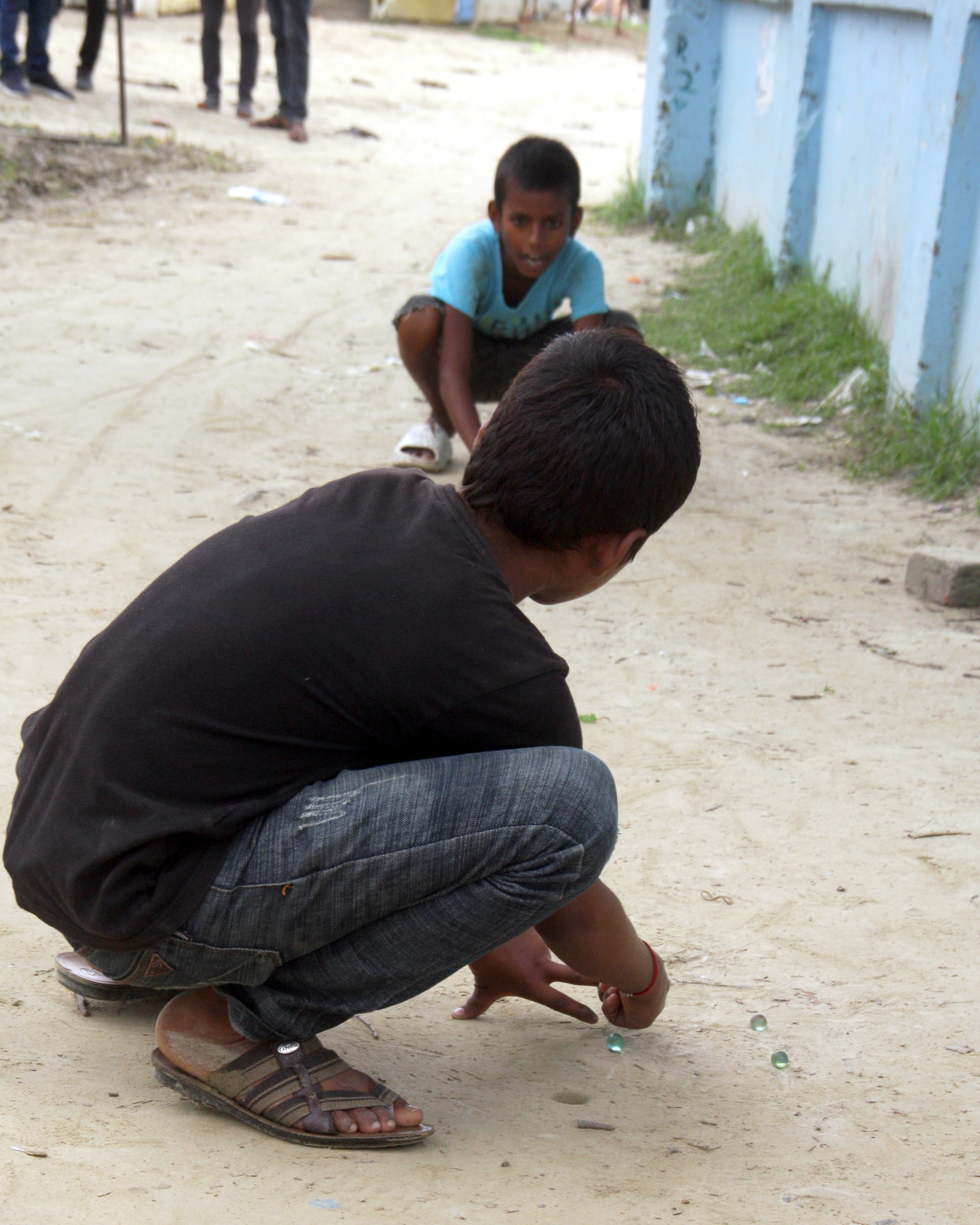
Children playing the game 'kancha' near Shambhunath Temple, Nepal

A marble is a small spherical object often made from glass, clay, steel, plastic, or agate. These toys can be used for a variety of games called marbles, as well being placed in marble runs or races, or created as a form of art. Sizes may vary, but usually range from about 0.5 to 3.5 cm (0.2 to 1.4 in) in diameter. They are often collected, both for nostalgia and for their aesthetic colors. In northern England, the game and objects are called "taws", with larger marbles being called "bottle washers", named after the use of a marble in Codd-neck bottles.

== Games ==
=== History ===
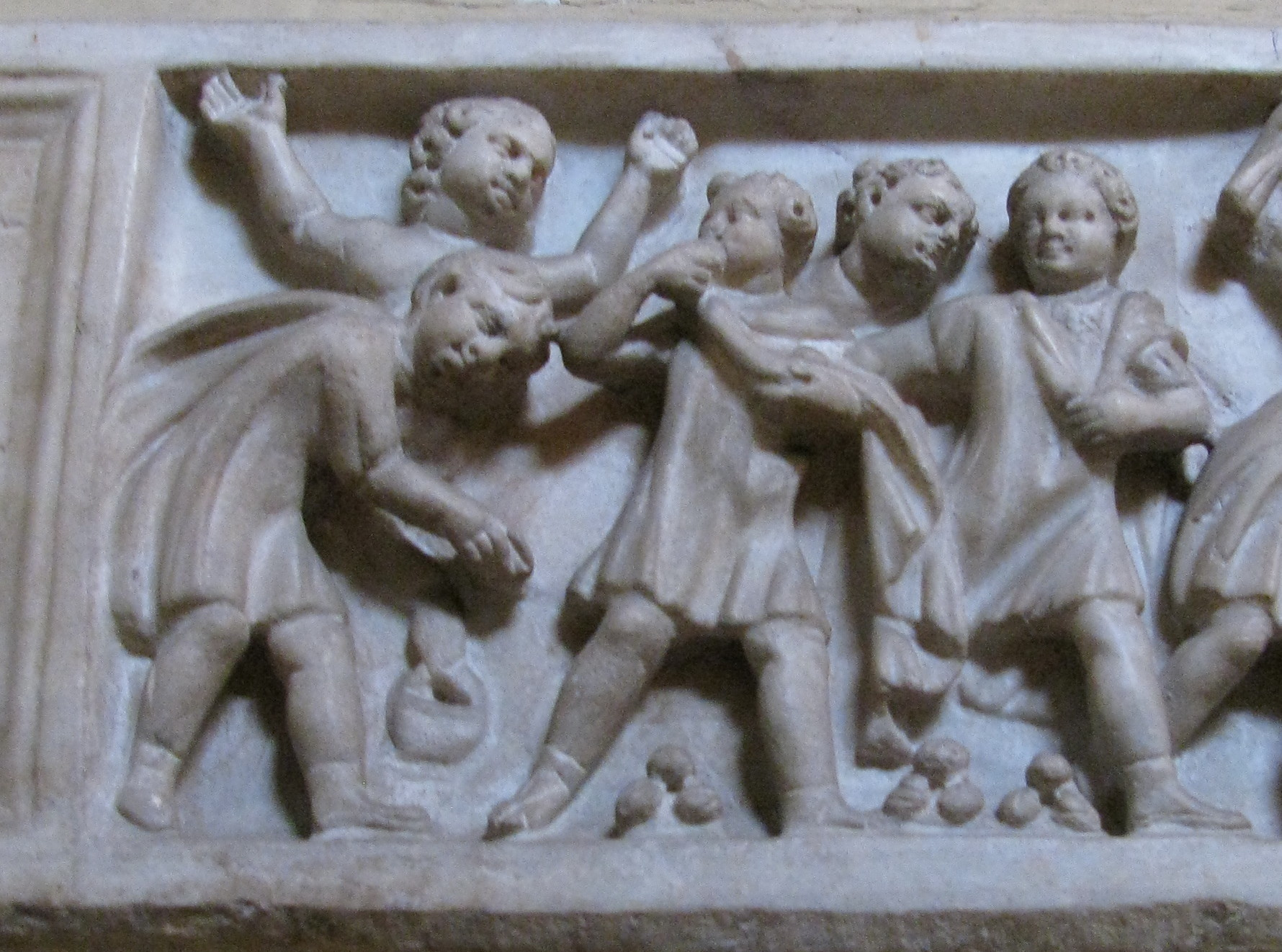
Roman children playing with nuts, child sarcophagi circa 270–300. Museum Pio Clementino, Vatican

In the early twentieth century, small balls of stone from about 2500 BCE, identified by archaeologists as marbles, were found by excavation near Mohenjo-daro, in a site associated with the Indus Valley Civilization. In modern India the game is called "kanche". Marbles are often mentioned in Roman literature, as in Ovid's poem "Nux" (which mentions playing the game with walnuts), and there are many examples of marbles from excavations of sites associated with Chaldeans of Mesopotamia and ancient Egypt. They were commonly made of clay, stone or glass. Marbles arrived in Britain, imported from the Low Countries, during the medieval era.

In 1503, the town council of Nuremberg, Germany, limited the playing of marble games to a meadow outside the town. The name "marble", used for the little toy balls, comes from this region and era, and refers to such balls being made of marble. At this point, marbles were made in mills and quarries by polishing small fragments of real stone like marble, agate, alabaster, limestone, and even brass.

It is unknown where marbles were first manufactured. A German glassblower invented marble scissors, a device for making marbles, in 1846. Ceramic marbles entered inexpensive mass production in the 1870s.

The game has become popular throughout the US and other countries. The first mass-produced toy marbles (clay) made in the US were made in Akron, Ohio, by S. C. Dyke, in the early 1890s. Some of the first US-produced glass marbles were also made in Akron by James Harvey Leighton. In 1903, Martin Frederick Christensen—also of Akron—made the first machine-made glass marbles on his patented machine. His company, M. F. Christensen & Son Co., manufactured millions of toy and industrial glass marbles until they ceased operations in 1917. The next US company to enter the glass marble market was Akro Agate. This company was started by Akronites in 1911, but located in Clarksburg, West Virginia. Today, there is only one American-based toy marble manufacturer: Marble King, in Paden City, West Virginia.

=== Types of games ===
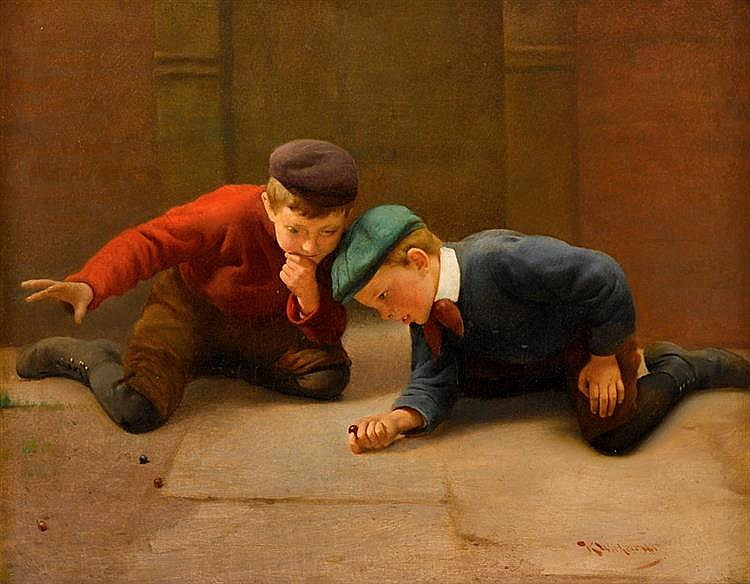
Game of Marbles, Karol D. Witkowski

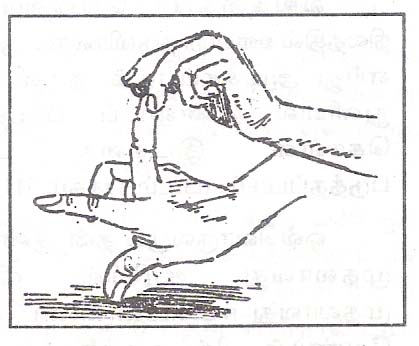
An illustration demonstrating the position one must take when shooting a marble in Indian marble games: the finger that is held back has the marble held against its tip, with the marble launched upon release of the finger.

Various games can be played with marbles.

One game popular in the United Kingdom and United States is ring taw (or "ringer"), where a ring is drawn on the ground and a number of small marbles placed within it. Players take turns to flick a larger "taw" marble at these marbles, attempting to knock them out of the ring.

In kanche (from South Asia), (Note: Also known as kancha.) players prepare for the game by standing behind a line and trying to flick their marble towards a designated hole, with the player who manages to flick their marble closest to the hole getting the chance to go first in the game. The marbles are all then placed in the center of a circle, with each player getting one striking marble and the chance to flick their marble in an attempt to strike the circle-marbles out of the circle. Each marble thus displaced is acquired by the striker, and once all the marbles have been struck out of the circle, the player with the most marbles wins the game.

Similarly, in pili goli (South Asia), the goal of the game is to flick a striking marble in order to knock other marbles laid around the field into holes that have been dug into the ground. (Note: A similar game is also known as 'goli pila')

=== World championship ===
The British and World Marbles Championship has been held at Tinsley Green, West Sussex, England, every year since 1932. (Marbles has been played in Tinsley Green and the surrounding area for many centuries: TIME magazine traces its origins to 1588.) Traditionally, the marbles-playing season started on Ash Wednesday and lasted until midday on Good Friday: playing after that was thought to bring bad luck. More than 20 teams from around the world take part in the championship, each Good Friday; German teams have been successful several times since 2000, although local teams from Crawley, Copthorne and other Sussex and Surrey villages often take part as well; the first championship in 1932 was won by Ellen Geary, a young girl from London.

=== Gameplay terminology ===
- "Knuckle down": the position adopted at the start line at the beginning of a match. The player begins with their knuckle against the ground.
- "Quitsies": allows any opponent to stop the game without consequence. Players can either have "quitsies" (able to quit) or "no quitsies".
- "Keepsies" (or "for keeps"): the player keeps all the marbles they win.
- "Elephant stompies": when called, it allows a player to stomp their marble level with the ground surface, making it very difficult for other players to hit.
- "Bombies": when called, it allows a player to take one or two steps while holding their marble and, while closing one eye, to line up over one of the opponent's marbles and drop the marble trying to hit the marble on the ground.
- "Leaning tops": when called, a shooter leans in on their off hand for leverage over an indentation on any type of surface or obstacle.
- A "taw" or "shooter" is generally a larger marble used to shoot with, and "ducks" are marbles to be shot at.
- Various names refer to the marble's size. Any marble larger than the majority may be termed a boulder, bonker, cosher, goen, masher, plumper, popper, shooter, thumper, smasher, goom, noogie, taw, bumbo, crock, bumboozer, bowler, tonk, tronk, godfather, tom bowler, fourer, giant, dobber, dobbert, hogger, biggie, jumbo or toebreaker. A marble smaller than the majority is a peawee, peewee or mini. A "grandfather" is the largest marble, the size of a billiards ball or tennis ball.
- Various names for different marble types (regional playground talk, Leicester, UK): Marleys (marbles), prit (white marble), Kong (large marble), King Kong (larger than a bosser), steely (metal bearing-ball). Names can be combined: e.g. prit-Kong (large white marble).

== Types of marbles ==
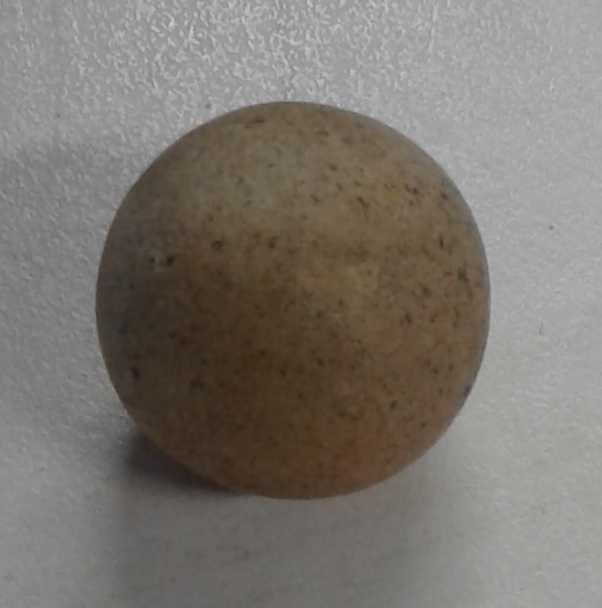
A clay marble, found in a field in the East Midlands

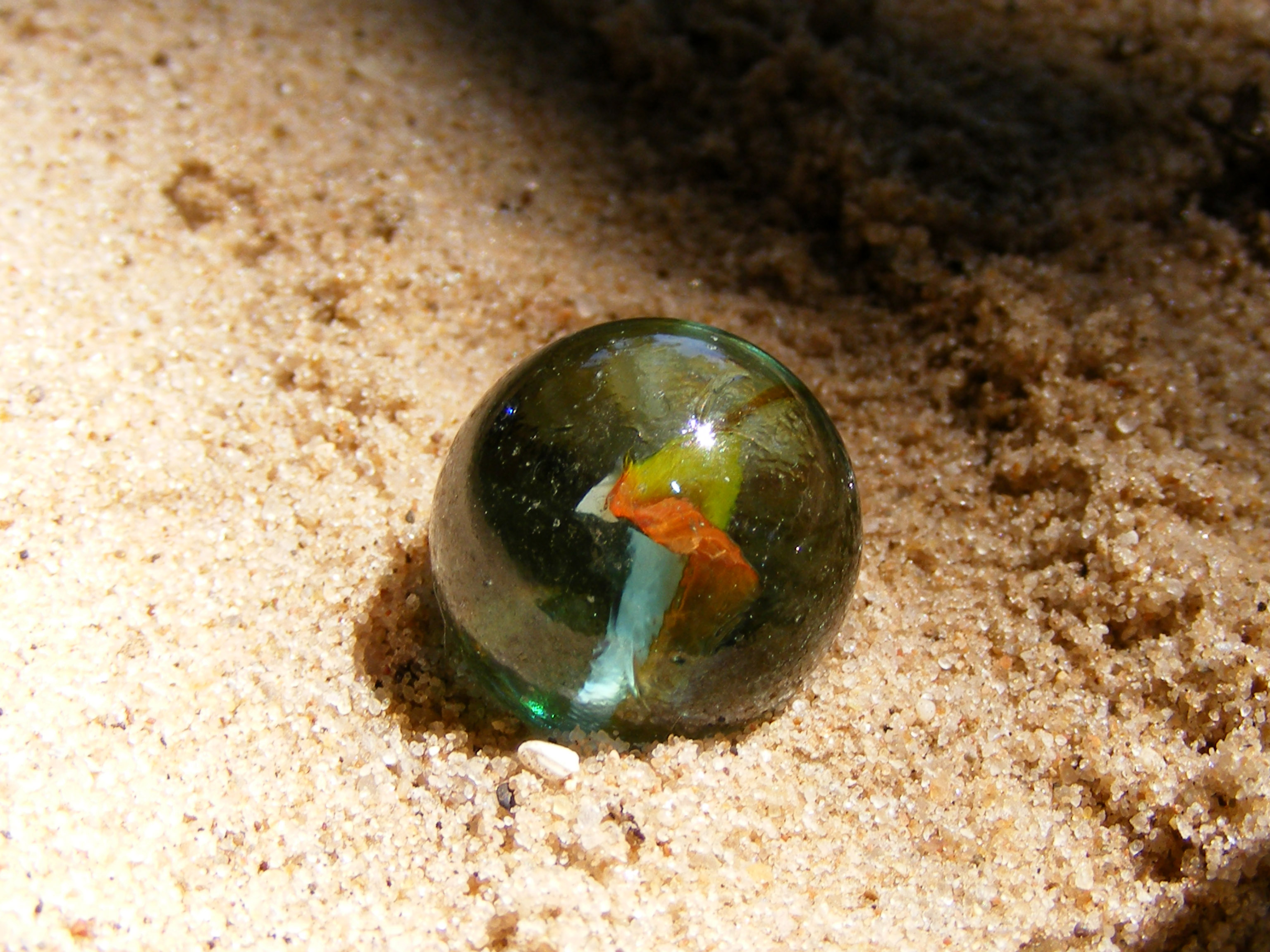
An orange and white toothpaste marble

Glass marbles from Indonesia

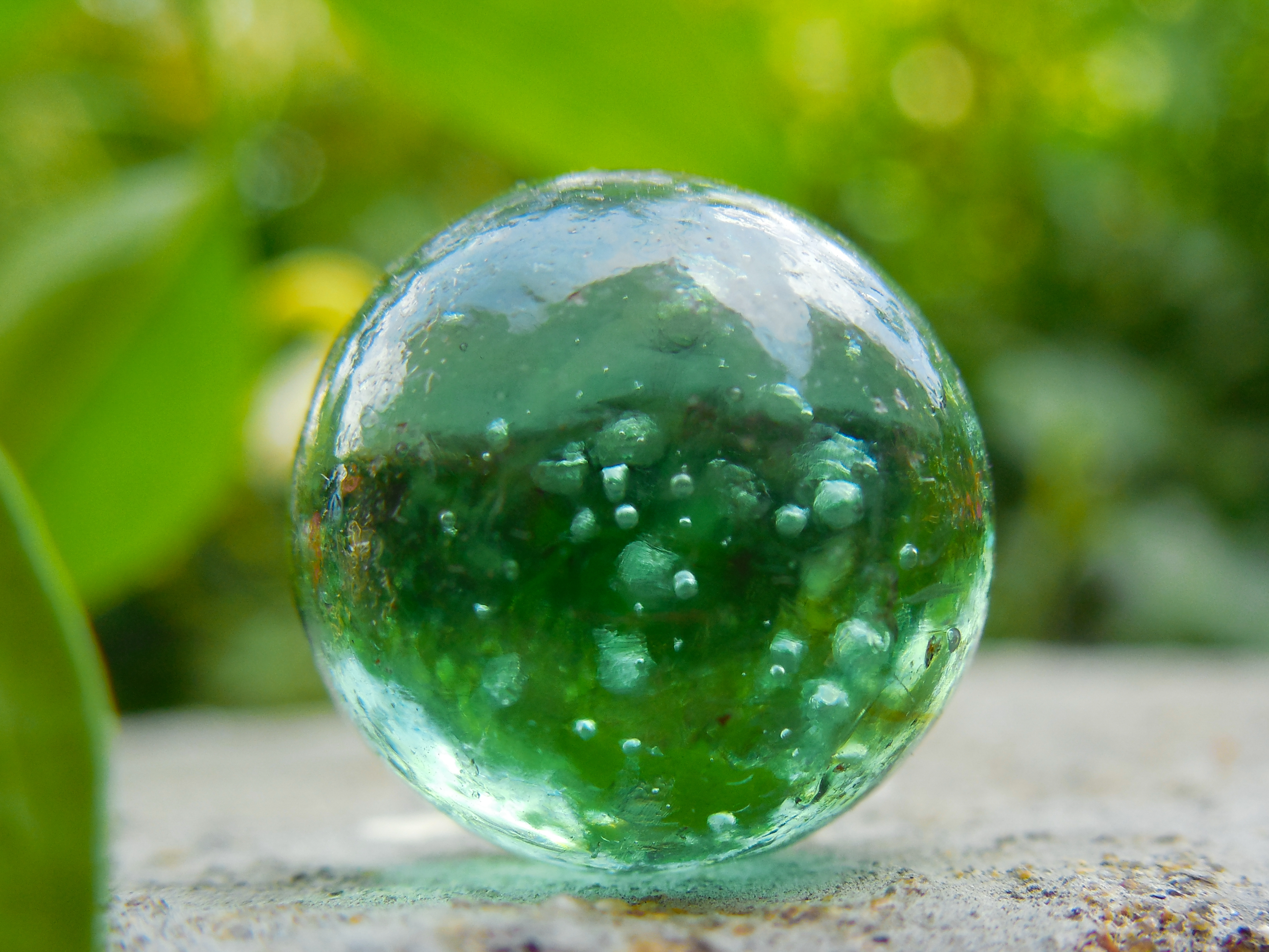
A green glass marble in India

There are various types of marbles, and names vary from locality to locality.

- Aggie – made of agate (aggie is short for agate) or glass resembling agate, with various patterns like in the alley, popular in Europe and the United States
- Alley or real – made of marble or alabaster (alley is short for alabaster), streaked with wavy or other patterns with exotic names like corkscrew, spiral, snake, ribbon, onyx, swirl, bumblebee, and butterfly
  - Ade – strands of opaque white and color, making lemon-ade, lime-ade, orange-ade, etc.
  - Cat's eye or catseye – central eye-shaped colored inserts or cores (injected inside the marble)
    - Beachball – three colors and six vanes
    - Devil's eye – red with yellow eye
- Red devils – same color scheme as a devil's eye but swirly
  - Clambroth – equally spaced opaque lines on a milk-white opaque base. Rare clams can have blue or black base glass. Medium-high value for antique marbles; rare base color valued much higher.
  - Lutz – antique, handmade German swirl, containing bands of fine copper flakes that glitter like gold. Erroneously thought to have been invented by noted glassmaker Nicholas Lutz. Medium-high value for antique marbles, depending on specific sub-type of Lutz design.
  - Oilie or oily – opaque with a rainbow, iridescent finish
  - Onionskin – antique, handmade German swirl, with many closely packed surface streaks. Medium price range for antique marbles.
  - Opaque – a popular marble that comes in many colors
  - Oxblood – a streaky patch resembling blood
  - Pearls – opaque with single color with mother of pearl finish
  - Toothpaste – also known as plainsies in Canada. Wavy streaks usually with red, blue, black, white, orange.
  - Turtle – wavy streaks containing green and yellow
- Bumblebee – modern, machine-made marble; mostly yellow with two black strips on each side
- China – glazed porcelain, with various patterns similar to an alley marble. Geometric patterns have low value; flowers or other identifiable objects can command high prices.
  - Plaster – a form of china that is unglazed
- Commie or common – made of clay; natural color or monochrome coloration. Made in huge quantities during nineteenth and early twentieth centuries.
  - Bennington – clay fired in a kiln with salt glaze—usually brown, often blue. Other colorations fairly scarce. Fairly low value.
  - Crock – made from crockery (earthenware) clay
- Croton alley or jasper – glazed and unglazed china marbled with blue
- Crystal or clearie or purie – any clear colored glass – including "opals," "glimmers," "bloods," "rubies," etc. These can have any number of descriptive names such as "deep blue sea", "blue moon", "green ghost", "brass bottle", "bloody Mary".
  - Princess – a tinted crystal
  - Galaxy – modern, machine-made marble; lots of dots inserted to look like a sky of stars
- Indian – antique, handmade German marble; dark and opaque, usually black, with overlaid groups of color bands; usually white, and one or more other colors. Can also have many colors like blue, green and scarlet. Medium price range for antique marbles.
- Mica – antique, handmade German marble; glassy to translucent with streaks or patches of mica, ranging from clear to misty. Value depends on glass color.
- Steely – made of steel; a steely was traditionally made from a flat piece of steel folded into a sphere and showed a cross where the corners all come together, but other versions of a steely are solid steel ball bearings.
- Sulphide – antique, handmade German marble; large (3 to 8 cm [1.25 to 3 in] or more) clear glass sphere with a small statuette or figure inside. Most common are domesticated animals such as dogs, cats, cows, etc.; then wild animals; human figures are scarce; inanimate objects such as a train or pocket watch are very rare and command high prices. The interior figures are made of white clay or kaolin, and appear a silvery color due to light refraction. A sulphide with a colored-glass sphere, or with a painted figure inside, is also very rare and brings a high price. Like other types of antique marbles, sulphides have been reproduced and faked in large quantities.
- Swirly – a common marble made out of glass with one swirly color
- Shooter – any marble but in a bigger size
- Tiger – clear with orange-yellow stripes
- Baby – white with colors visible on the outside
- Tom bowler – large glass marble at least twice as big as a normal marble

=== Art marbles ===
Art marbles are high-quality collectible marbles arising out of the art glass movement. They are sometimes referred to as contemporary glass marbles to differentiate them from collectible antique marbles, and are spherical works of art glass.

Collectible contemporary marbles are made mostly in the United States by individual artists such as Josh Simpson.

Art marbles are usually around 50 millimetres (2.0 in) in diameter (a size also known as a "toe breaker"), but can vary, depending on the artist and the print.

== Marble collecting ==
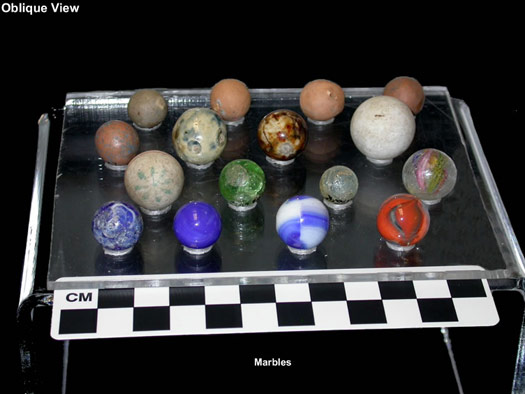
Some historic marbles

Marble players often grow to collect marbles after having outgrown the game. Marbles are categorized by many factors including condition, size, type, manufacturer/artisan, age, style, materials, scarcity, and the existence of original packaging (which is further rated in terms of condition). A marble's worth is primarily determined by type, size, condition and eye-appeal, coupled with the law of supply and demand. Ugly, but rare marbles may be valued as much as those of very fine quality. However, this is the exception, rather than the rule, and normally "condition is king" when it comes to marbles. Any surface damage (characterized by missing glass, such as chips or pits) typically cuts book value by 50% or more.

Due to the large market, there are many related side businesses that have sprung up such as numerous books and guides, web sites dedicated to live auctions of marbles only, and collector conventions. Additionally, many glass artisans produce art marbles for the collectors' market only, with some selling for thousands of dollars.

== Manufacturing ==
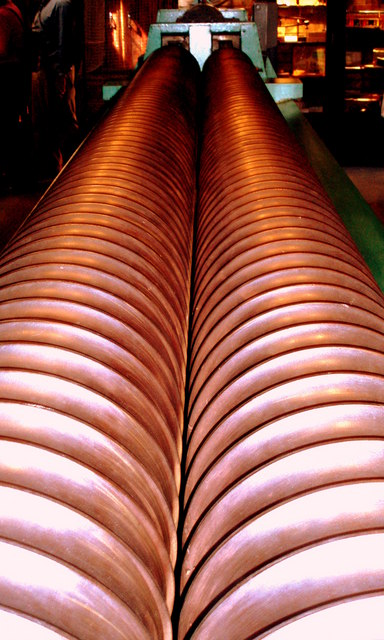
A very large American-made marble-making machine at Bovey Tracey, Devon, England

Marbles are made using many techniques. They can be categorized into two general types: hand-made and machine-made.

Marbles were originally made by hand. Stone or ivory marbles can be fashioned by grinding. Clay, pottery, ceramic, or porcelain marbles can be made by rolling the material into a ball, and then letting dry, or firing, and then can be left natural, painted, or glazed. Clay marbles, also known as crock marbles or commies (common), are made of slightly porous clay, traditionally from local clay or leftover earthenware ("crockery"), rolled into balls, then glazed and fired at low heat, creating an opaque imperfect sphere that is frequently sold as an "old timey" marble. Glass marbles can be fashioned through the production of glass rods which are stacked together to form the desired pattern, cutting the rod into marble-sized pieces using marble scissors, and rounding the still-malleable glass.

One mechanical technique is dropping globules of molten glass into a groove made by two interlocking parallel screws. As the screws rotate, the marble travels along them, gradually being shaped into a sphere as it cools. Color is added to the main batch glass and to additional glass streams that are combined with the main stream in a variety of ways. For example, in the "cat's-eye" style, colored glass veins are injected into a transparent main stream. Applying more expensive colored glass to the surface of cheaper transparent or white glass is also a common technique.

Currently, the world's largest manufacturer of playing marbles is Vacor de Mexico. Founded in 1934, the company now makes 90 percent of the world's marbles. Over 12 million are produced daily.

=== Machine made manufacturers ===
In the U.S., the following manufacturers exist:

- M.F. Christensen (1904–1917)
- Akro Agate Company (1911–1951)
- Christensen Agate (1925–1933)
- Peltier Glass Company (1927–2002)
- Ravenswood (1928–1955)
- Alley Agate (1929–1947)
- Master Glass (1930–1974)
- Vitro Agate Company (1932–2004)
- Kokomo Opalescent Glass Co. (1939–1942)
- Alox (1930s to 1940s)
- Jackson Marble Company (1945–1946)
- Playrite Marble and Novelty Company (1940–1947)
- Cairo Novelty Company (1946–1952)
- Heaton Agate Company (1946–1971)
- Davis Marble Works (1947–1948)
- Marble King (1949–current)
- C.E. Bogard & Sons (1971–1986)
- Mid Atlantic of West Virginia (1990–2004)
- JABO, Inc. (1991–2021)
- Sammy's Mountain Marbles (2012–current)
- Dave's Appalachian Swirls (2014–current)

== Related games ==
=== Video games ===
- Marble Madness (1984), an Atari game wherein players race each other to the finish line
- Oxyd (1991), a game for Amiga, Atari ST, and Macintosh
- Marble Drop (1997), a computer game wherein players place marbles in a complicated apparatus in an attempt to solve a puzzle
- Lose Your Marbles (1997), a PC puzzle game where players line up marbles of the same color to add marbles to the other player's board and eventually block their board
- Marble Blast Gold (2003), a "get to the finish" third person game for the PC and Xbox; a sequel, Marble Blast Ultra (2006), was released later for the Xbox 360
- Ballance (2004), a game for the PC
- Switchball (2007), a game for the PC and Xbox 360
- Enigma (2007)
- The World Ends with You (2007) and Neo: The World Ends With You (2021) are role-playing games that both include a marble-style minigame played with pin badges called "Tin Pin Slammer" or "Marble Slash"
- Marbles on Stream (2018), a marble racing game made to be live-streamed on Twitch (service)
- Marble It Up (2018), a spiritual successor to Marble Blast Ultra

=== Other ===
- Abalone (board game), a board game in which white and black marbles try to knock each other into a gutter that lines the outside of the board
- Aggravation (board game), a variation of Pachisi
- B-Daman, a toy that fires marbles and can be played under several game rules
- Battle B-Daman, a manga series about a game that is an enhanced version of marbles
- Bakugan Battle Brawlers, a game which uses magnetic spring loading marbles which open up to reveal creatures used to play the game
- Chinese checkers, often called "marble checkers", a board game for two to six players using marbles as game pieces
- Hungry Hungry Hippos, a tabletop game for two to four players involving marbles
- KerPlunk, a game for two to four players involving marbles
- A rolling ball sculpture (also marble slide, marble maze, marble run, marble rail, marble coaster). Used in such things as pinball machines and Rube Goldberg machines. A game of skill, involving building using; rails, tracks, cones, wheels, levers, and ramps.
- Tock, also known as Tuck, is a cards or board game in which players race their four marbles (or tokens) around the board, with the objective being to be the first to take all of one's marbles "home".

== See also ==
- Carved stone balls
- Cherokee marbles
- Rolling ball sculpture
- Croquet
- Elections in the Gambia. Electors drop marbles to vote for a candidate.
- Jelle's Marble Runs, a YouTube channel featuring marble races and events.
- Marble racing, a game involving marbles that race down a racing track.
- Ohajiki, a similar Japanese game.
- Marble gun, an improvised weapon that shoots marbles.
