= Jeu des petits chevaux =

French cross and circle game, closely related to ludo

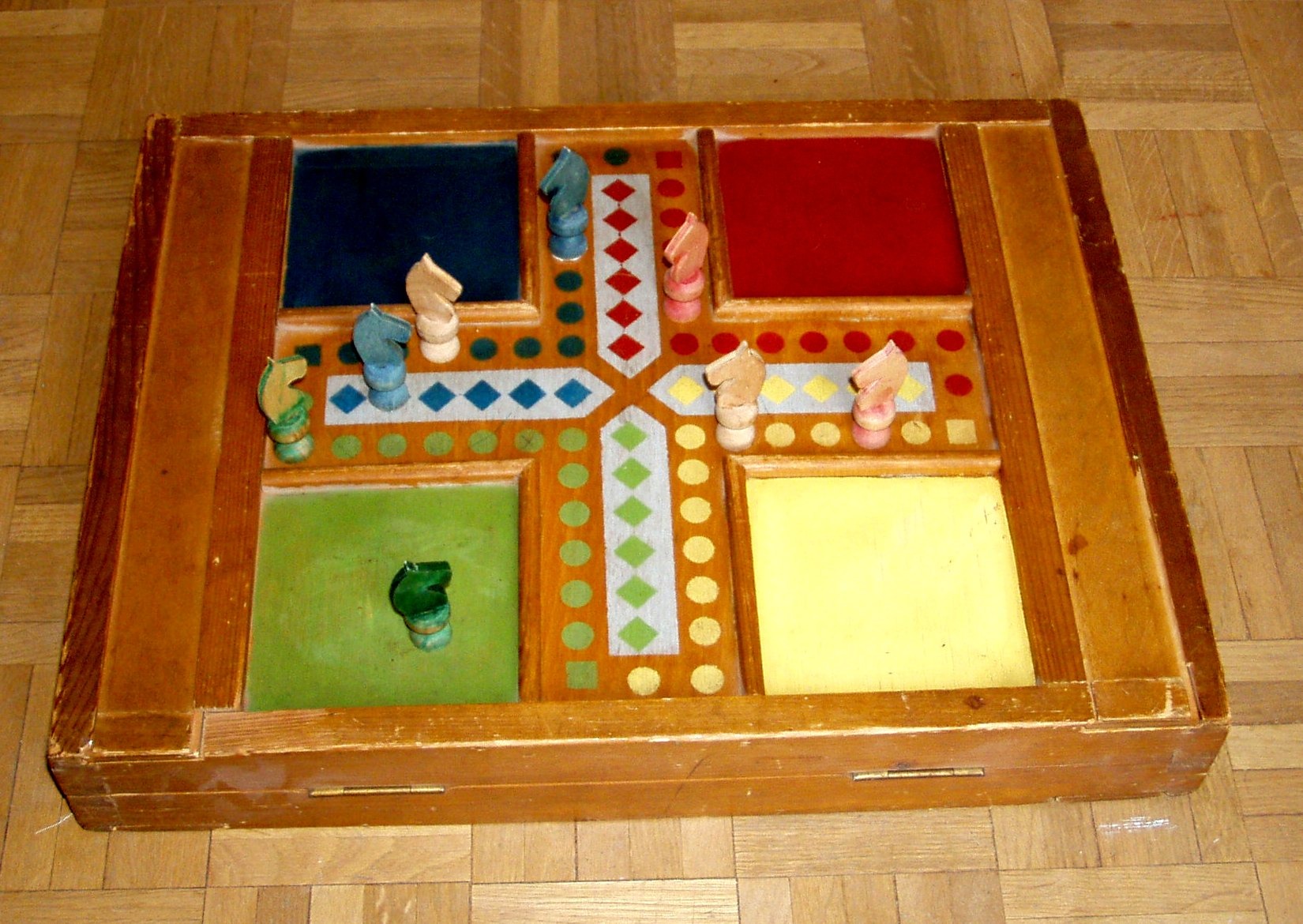
- A game of Petits-Chevaux (Small Horses), a French boardgame, based on Parcheesi and Ludo
- Players: 2–4
- Setup time: 1–3 min.
- Playing time: 20–50 min.

Jeu des petits chevaux (lit. 'game of small horses') is a French cross and circle game, closely related to ludo. It consists of moving several pawns (called horses) to the home reserved for their color. Each player will receive between 1 and 4 horses. The first player to reach the last triangular square wins the game.

The game is very similar to the board game Tock, but uses dice instead of cards.

== Rules ==
Example of a game board

Two to four players each have one or more horse pawns, and play by rolling a dice in turn. A player must first roll a 6 with the dice to be able to remove a horse from their stable. They must then make it go through all the squares located on the periphery of the board, moving it forward by a number of squares equal to the result of the die. The pawns are advanced clockwise.

When a horse arrives on a space occupied by a competitor, it sends it back to its stable (the start). On the other hand, if a horse lands on a square occupied by another horse of their color, it stops just behind. Additionally, rolling a 6 allows the player to play again.

After their pawn has gone around the board, players must roll the exact number so that their pawn stops in front of their staircase. For example, if the horse pawn is located three squares from the bottom of the stairs, the player must roll a 3 on their dice to take their pawn up the stairs. If the number is too large, they advances their pawn to the bottom square of the stairs, then move it back by the number of squares corresponding to the difference between the number to be made and the number made. Pawns may therefore not go on a second loop around the board.

Once a player's pawn is in the square in front of the stairs of their color, it must go up step by step to the center of the board. For this, the player must obtain a roll corresponding to the stair they wish to move the pawn to (1 for the first step, 2 for the second, and so on until the last step, the center, which requires a 6)

The game is won by the first player who manages to bring, according to variants, one or more of their horse pawns to the center of the board.

Each player is free to bring out however many pawns they want (usually up to 4), but they can only move one pawn per turn.
