= British and World Marbles Championship =

Yearly tournament of games of marbles taking place in Britain

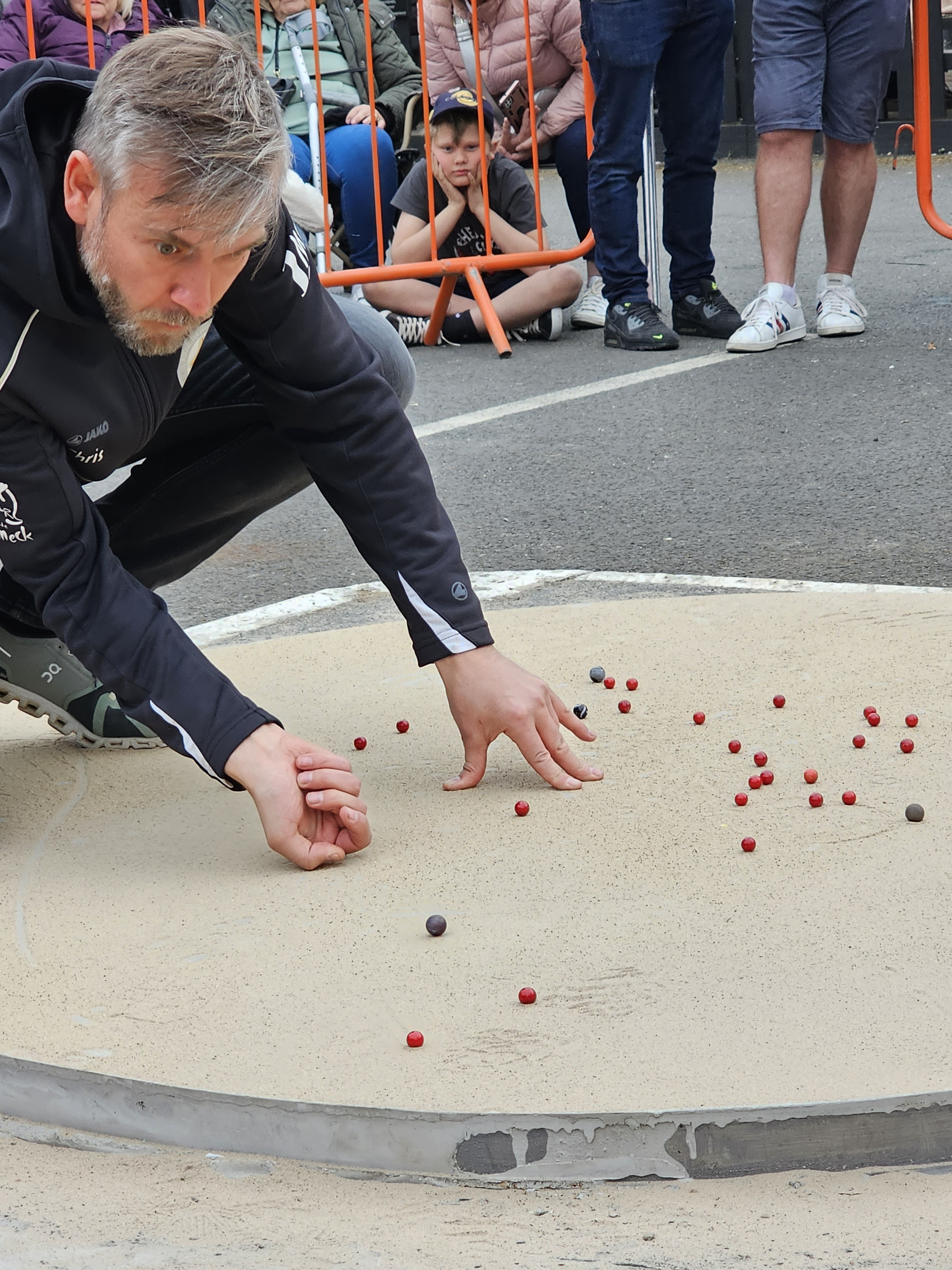
- Chris Pampel in play at the 2025 tournament
- Highest governing body: British Marbles Board of Control (BMBC)
- First played: 1588

Characteristics
- Contact: No
- Type: Pub games, Precision sports
- Equipment: 49 marbles 12mm dia, tolley 18mm dia, concrete ring 6ft dia covered with sand

The British and World Marbles Championship is a marbles knock-out tournament that takes place annually on Good Friday and dates back to 1588. It is held at the Greyhound public house in Tinsley Green, West Sussex. Teams of six players participate to win the title and a silver trophy. The event is open to anyone of any age or nationality. Over the years, players from Australia, Belgium, Canada, Estonia, Ireland, France, Germany, Japan, Netherlands, Wales and the United States have participated alongside English teams.

The event took place on World Marbles Day, Bank Holiday Good Friday, April 3, 2026. The tournament was won by the Turners Hill Tollymen, their first ever win.

== History ==
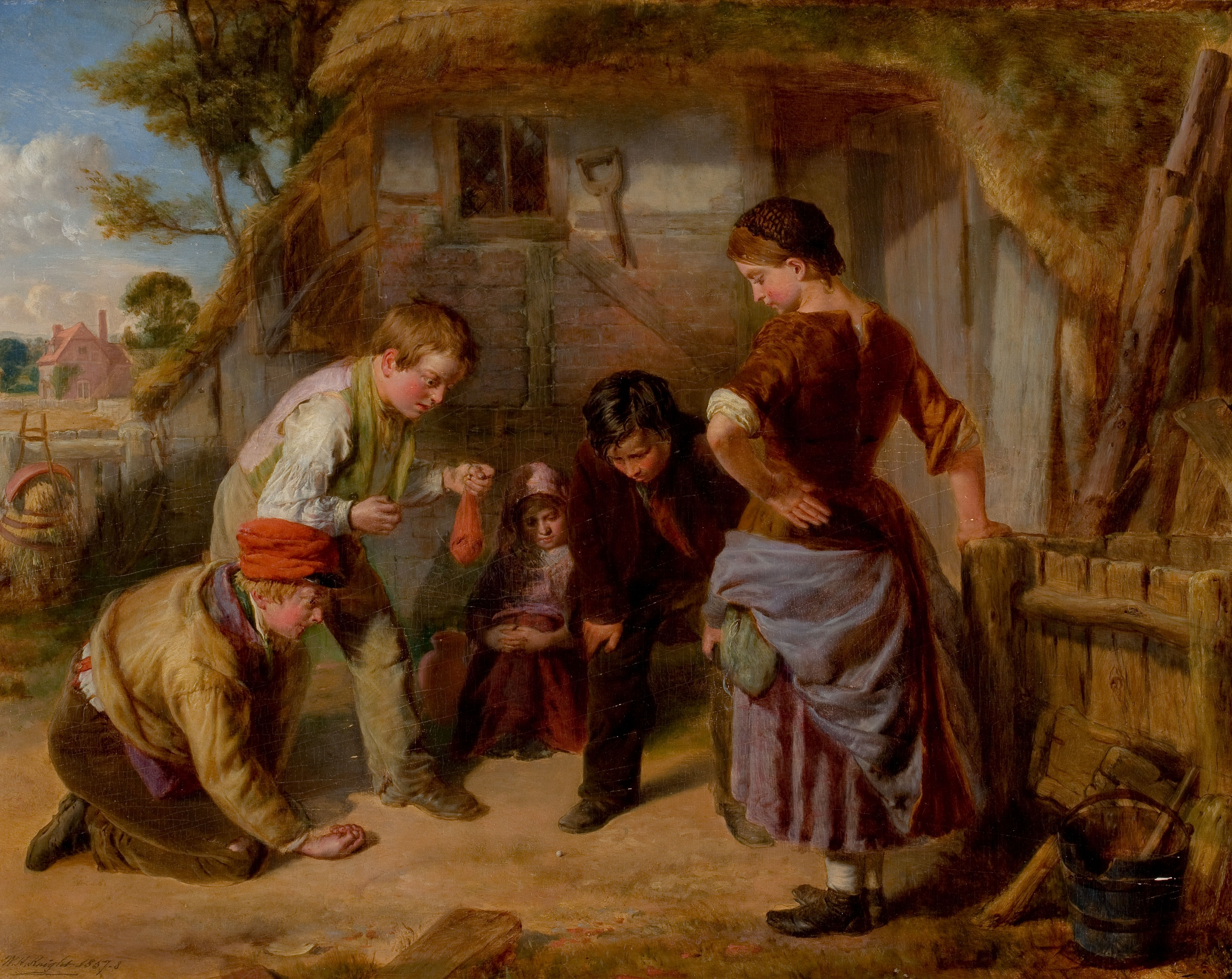
Knuckle Down - The game of marbles being played in 1857

The tournament dates back to 1588 during the reign of Elizabeth I, when marbles was chosen as the deciding game of a legendary sporting encounter between two young suitors, Giles and Hodge, over the hand of a Tinsley Green milk maiden named Joan. Every popular sport of the day was played in an Olympic style contest lasting one week. Hodge had been victorious at singlestick, backsword, quarter staff, cudgel play, wrestling and cock throwing, while Giles had won at archery, cricket-a-wicket, tilting at quintain (jousting targets), Turk's head, stoolball and tipcat. With the score level at 6–6, Good Friday was the date chosen for the final event. Marbles was chosen by the girl to be the deciding game, and Giles defeated Hodge.

Marble tournaments have purportedly been played at Tinsley Green since the late 1500s, until the launching of the current event in 1932. Local historians have concluded that around that time, many individual county marble championships were amalgamated to create the British Marble Championships, which was only renamed as the British and World Marbles Championship for the first time in 1938.

The 2020 and 2021 events were cancelled due to the COVID-19 pandemic. The championship resumed in 2022.

== Rules, marble "jargon" and tactics ==
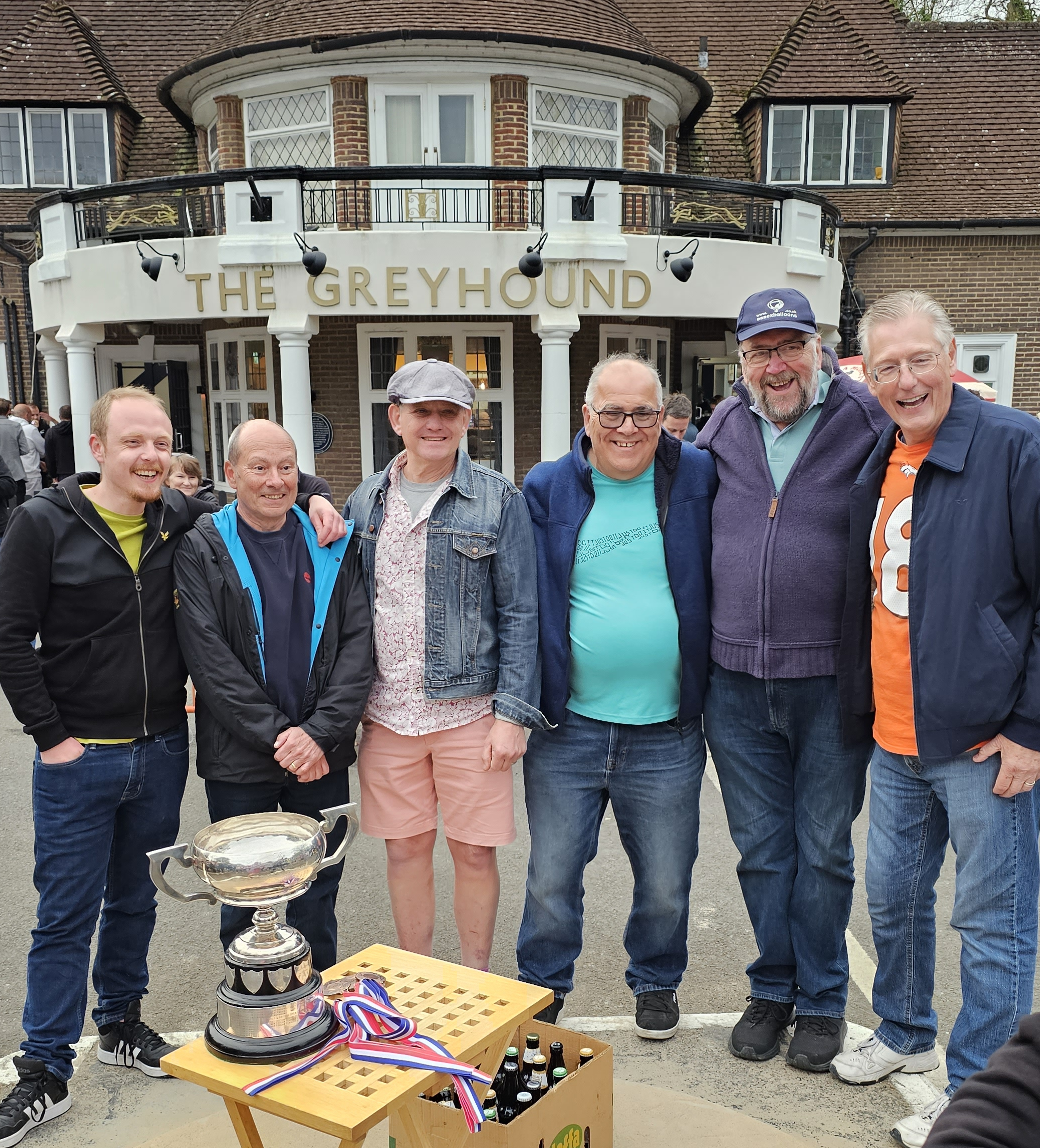
Black Dog Boozers - runner up 2025

The championships are organized by the British Marbles Board of Control (BMBC) and the version of marbles played is Ring Taw, known in the United States as "Ringer" and in Germany as "Englisches Ringspiel". Forty-nine target marbles are grouped closely together in 6-foot diameter (1.8-metre) raised concrete ring covered with sand, each of the target marbles being a coloured glass or ceramic sphere having a diameter of approximately 12mm (half an inch).

Two teams of six players of any age, gender or skill level, take turns using the tip of the finger to aim and project the "tolley", a larger marble (commonly referred to as the "shooter" or "taw"), which is a glass or ceramic sphere of 18mm diameter (three-quarters of an inch), deploying top spin, back spin and side spin, to drive other marbles out of the ring.

A player's knuckle must be touching the ground when shooting, known as "knuckling down". Moving the tolley closer to the target marbles, known as "cabbaging", is forbidden - as is any other advantageous movement of a players shooting hand during shooting. These would constitute a foul known as "fudging". Any intentional or persistent contact between a player's clothing and a marble or tolley while it is motion would be a foul called "blocking". No score results from a foul shot. A foul shot ends the turn of the offending player, though the score achieved in that turn stands. Any player who makes three foul shots during a game is eliminated from that game. The first team to knock out 25 marbles from the ring is the winner.

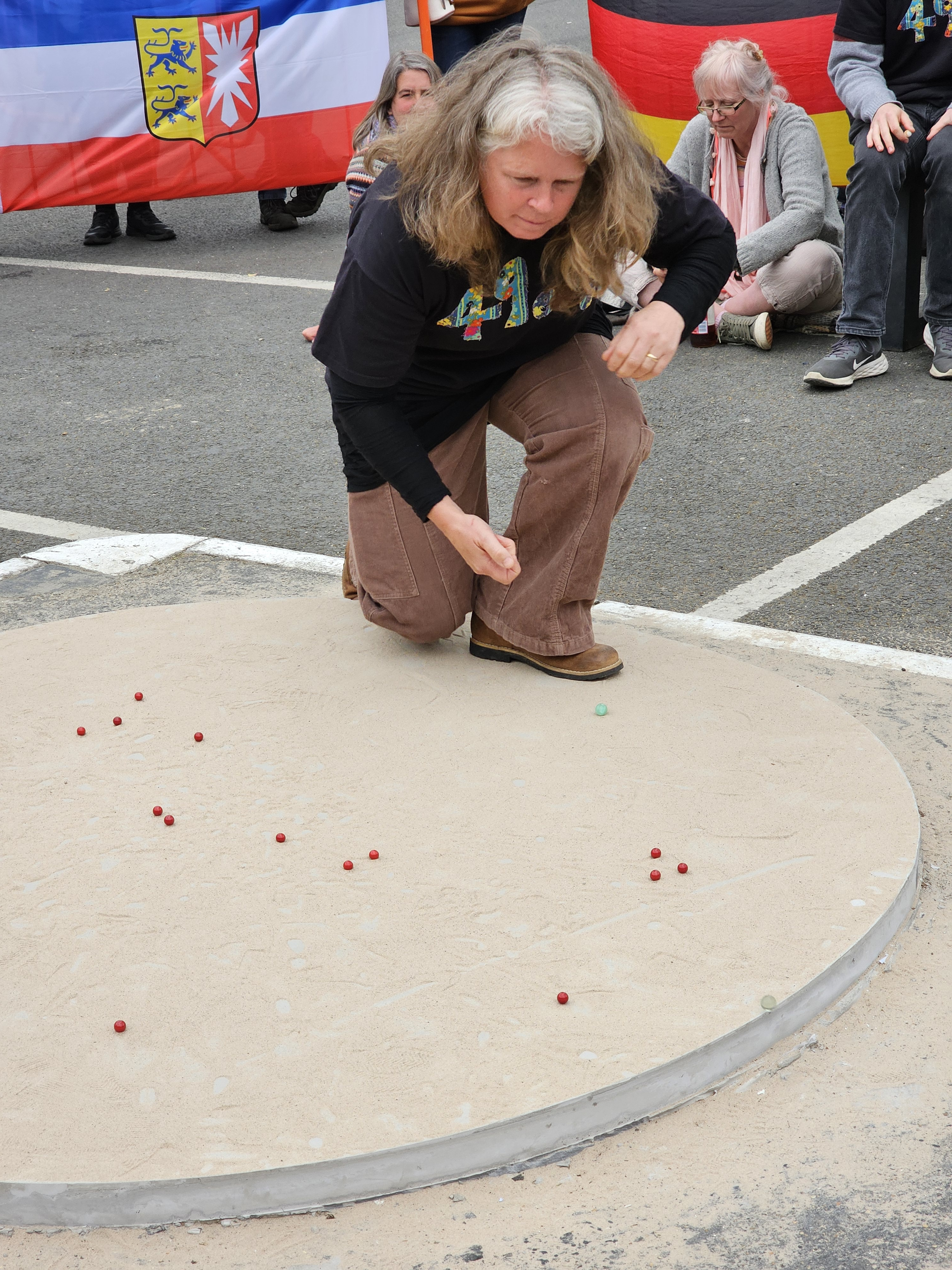
Alison Reimer in play 2025

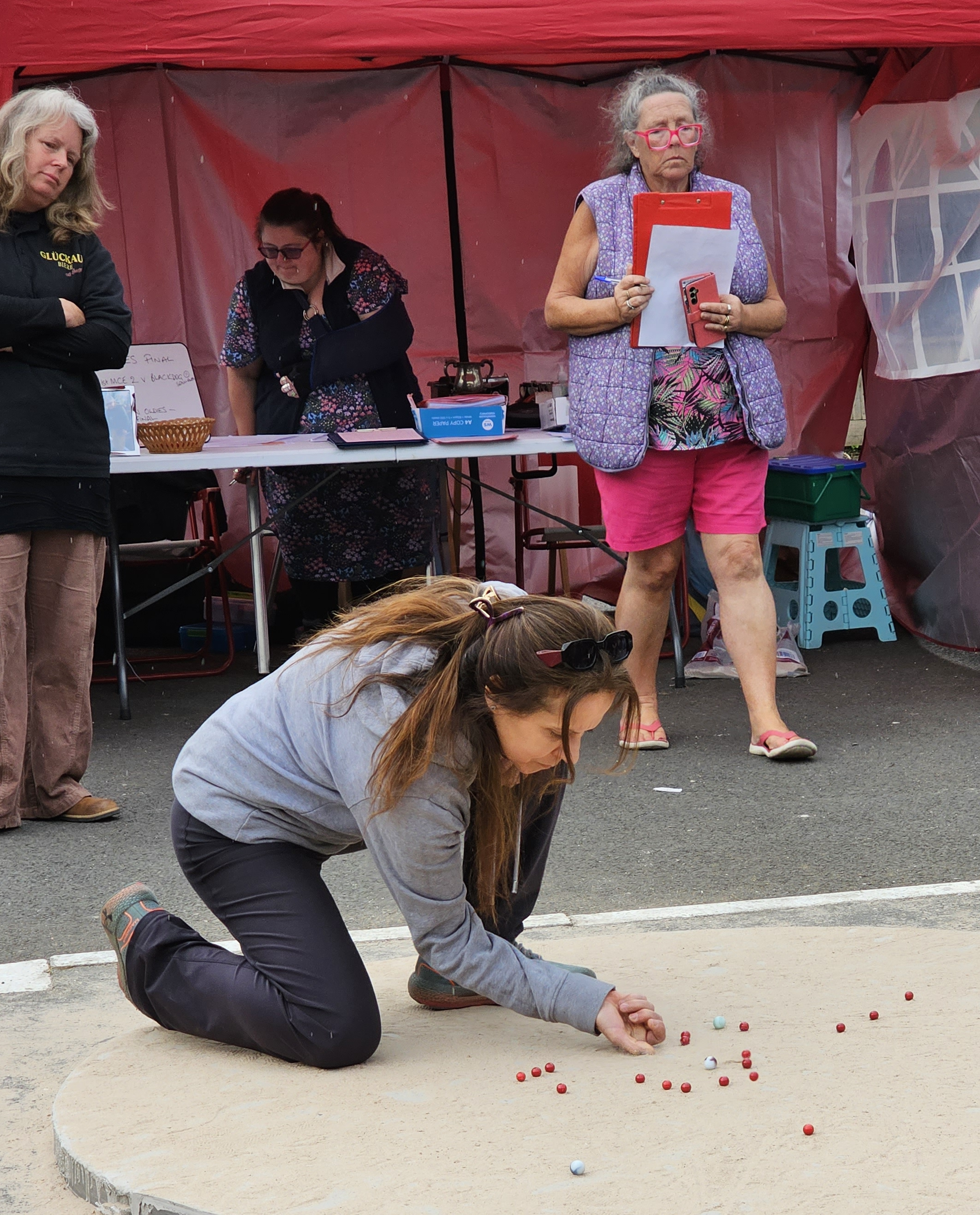
Leila Kara in play 2025

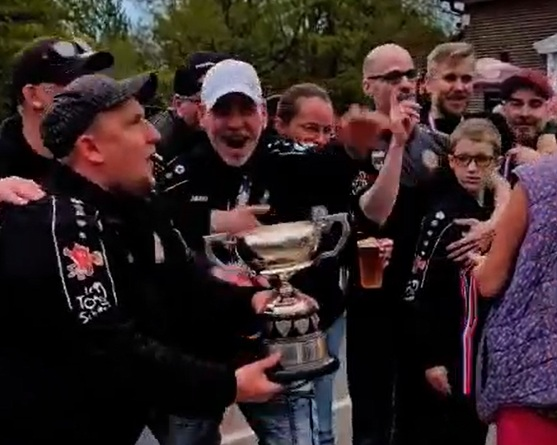
2025 winners 1st MC Erzgebirge in celebration

== Historical timeline ==
- 1588 – Giles defeated Hodge at marbles to claim the hand of a local young maiden of Tinsley Green.
- 1888 – Sam Spooner wins the title on the 300th year of the event (as British Pathé video 1938).
- 1932 – The Black Horse from Hookwood, were the first winners of the modern event.
- 1935 – 6-foot concrete ring used for the first time
- 1938 - British Marbles Championship renamed as the "British and World Marbles Championship".
- 1942–1945 – No tournaments took place due to World War II.
- March 1951 – The coldest recorded conditions for tournament, the Tinsley Green Tigers beat the Arundel Mullets in the final.
- April 1953 - First ever international match at Tinsley Green, 'Governor Gobs' (United States) played a team of players from Sussex teams.
- April 1962 – Glass marbles were used for the first time in place of older clay marbles.
- March 1970 – Controversially the BMBC banned women from the main tournament because of the wearing of mini-skirts.
- March 1972 – Teams of women played in the main event for the first time, the Prima Donnas from Crawley, and the Kernockers from London.
- April 1973 - Len Smith Interview for BBC Nationwide Sport - 12 April, 1973 He wins 12th individual title.
- April 1974 - Heavy rain halts the tournament, which resumed 2 weeks later on Sunday 28 April.
- March 1975 – Snow had to be swept from the ring in temperatures of −2 °C. The "Terribles" win a record 19th title.
- April 1976 - In a separate international championship, USA defeated England (represented by the "Terribles"); USA were Ray Jarrel aged 17, Larry Kakos 16, Susan Regan 15, Rick Unser 15, Ray Morgano 19, and Jerry Magers 16.
- April 1977 – The tournament was moved to the Crawley Leisure Centre for one single time.
- April 1984 - Shortest final ever 2 minutes. Tony Jones 6, Paddy Graham 18, Taffy Holmes with the winner.
- April 1987 – A Trophy was introduced for "the women's best individual player" and won by Jackie Hodge.
- 14 Sept 1987 - Black Dog boozers enter Guinness World Records for ring clearance (2 mins 56 seconds) for BBC's Record Breakers.
- 1989 and 1991 – Highest number of teams ever entered, 28 teams of six totalling 168 players competing.
- March 1992 – The TennKy Sharpshooters are the first overseas team to win the trophy.
- March 1994 – Blue target marbles were used for the first and only time.
- April 2000 – Team USA won the international Fen Cup with a team made up almost entirely of shooters under the age of 18.
- April 2002 – Golden Oldies tournament added for competitors aged 50 over, first one won by Barry Ray.
- April 2002 – Saxonia Globe Snippers become the first German team to win the tournament.
- September 2008 - the Greyhound Pub closed, only re-opening shortly before the next tournament.
- April 2010 – Jen McGowan (formerly Jen LeBon) wins a twelfth ladies individual title.
- March 2013 – Crawley-based Black Dog Boozers win the tournament for a 13th time, just 6 off the record of 19 set in 1975.
- March 2018 – The Johnson Jets set the record for being runners up 11 times.
- 2020 and 2021 – Events cancelled due to COVID-19 pandemic.
- July 2021 - Sad loss of Sam McCarthy-Fox, long time organiser of the event and ambassador of the game of marbles for over forty years.
- 15 April 2022 - The event returned to The Greyhound after three years, organised by Julia McCarthy-Fox.
- 7 April 2023 - The longest streak of different winning teams in history, with 5 different teams having won the last five tournaments.
- 18 April 2025 - Alison Reimer(Ray) sets the all time most wins: 13 in the individual ladies

== Championship results ==
Year	Date	Teams Entered	Team winner	Runners up	Individual winner	Best Lady	Golden Oldie	Weather
1932	24 Mar	5	Black Horse	–	–	–	—N/a	–
1933	14 Apr	–	–	–	–	–	—N/a	–
1934	29 Mar	7	–	–	Jack Arnold	–	—N/a	–
1935	19 Apr	4	Tinsley Green	–	Big Bert Botting	–	—N/a	–
1936	10 Apr	4	Crawley Busmen	Southern Railways	F.S.'Champ' Harding	–	—N/a	–
1937	26 Apr	6	Tinsley Green	Rustington Rambles	George Burberry	–	—N/a	–
1938	15 Apr	5	Copthorne Sharpshooters	Crawley Busmen	Tom Weekes	–	—N/a	–
1939	7 Apr	8	Old Comrades	Crawley Busmen	Fred Rowe (Copthorne Sharpshooters)	–	—N/a	Sunny / Note: 4000 spectators
1940 (A)	25 Mar	10	Copthorne Sharpshooters	Old Comrades	Fred Rowe (Copthorne Sharpshooters)	–	—N/a	–
1940 (B)	22 Mar	2	Crawley Busmen	The Army	F.S.'Champ'Harding	–	—N/a	–
1941	11 Apr	7	Copthorne Spitfires	Crawley Busmen	Jack Carman	–	—N/a	–
1942–1945	No games (WW II)							
1946	19 Apr	7	Copthorne Sharpshooters	Copthorne Spitfires	Harry Langridge	–	—N/a	–
1947	4 Apr	4	Copthorne Sharpshooters	Crawley Tools	Harry Langridge	–	—N/a	Rain
1948	26 Mar	5	Copthorne Spitfires	Copthorne Sharpshooters	Harry Langridge	–	—N/a	Fine
1949	15 Apr	6	Tinsley Green Tigers	Arundel Mullets	Harry Langridge	–	—N/a	Sunny
1950	7 Apr	8	Arundel Mullets	Tinsley Green Tigers	Wee Willie Wright (TG Tigers)	–	—N/a	Sunny
1951	23 Mar	4	Tinsley Green Tigers	Arundel Mullets	Big Bernard Wilcock	–	—N/a	Very cold
1952	11 Apr	6	Tinsley Green Tigers	Handcross Bulldogs	Cyril Wilcock	–	—N/a	Best weather for years
1953	3 Apr	6	Tinsley Green Tigers	Copthorne Spitfires	Cyril Wilcock	–	—N/a	–
1954	16 Apr	5	Tinsley Green Tigers	Arundel Mullets	Aurthur Chamberlain	–	—N/a	Sunny and cold
1955	8 Apr	8	Tinsley Green Tigers	Rebels	Wee Willie Wright	–	—N/a	Fine
1956	30 Mar	6	The Casuals	Tinsley Green Tigers	Wee Willie Wright	–	—N/a	Cold and dry
1957	19 Apr	7	Telcon Terribles	Rebels	Wee Willie Wright	–	—N/a	Dry
1958	4 Apr	6	Telcon Terribles	Tinsley Tigers	Len Smith (Terr)	–	—N/a	Sunny and cold
1959	27 Mar	5	Telcon Terribles	Tinsley Tigers	Wee Willie Wright	–	—N/a	Drizzle
1960	15 Apr	9	Telcon Terribles	Tinsley Tigers	Len Smith	–	—N/a	–
1961	31 Mar	5	Telcon Terribles	Tinsley Tigers	Len Smith	–	—N/a	–
1962	20 Apr	6	Telcon Terribles	Rulslip Rat Pack	Len Smith	–	—N/a	Cold and windy
1963	12 Apr	7	Telcon Terribles	Tolley Flickers	Alan Smith (T-Terribles)	–	—N/a	Dull and cold
1964	27 Mar	6	Toucon Terribles	Tolley Flickers	Len Smith	–	—N/a	–
1965	16 Apr	4	Toucon Terribles	Johnson Jets	Len Smith	–	—N/a	–
1966	8 Apr	8	Toucon Terribles	Us	Alan Smith	–	—N/a	–
1967	24 Mar	8	Toucon Terribles	Boys of County Armagh	Alan Smith	–	—N/a	–
1968	12 Apr	6	Toucon Terribles	Johnson Jets	Len Smith	–	—N/a	–
1969	4 Apr	8	Toucon Terribles	Johnson Jets	Len Smith	–	—N/a	–
1970	27 Mar	10	Toucon Terribles	Johnson Jets	Len Smith	–	—N/a	–
1971	9 Apr	7	Toucon Terribles	Johnson Jets	Len Smith	–	—N/a	–
1972	31 Mar	9	Toucon Terribles	Johnson Jets	Len Smith	–	—N/a	–
1973	20 Apr	12	Toucon Terribles	Pernod Rams	Len Smith	–	—N/a	–
1974	12 Apr	12	Toucon Terribles	Pernod Rams	Alan Smith	–	—N/a	Rained off
1975	28 Mar	16+	Toucon Terribles	Johnson Jets	Alan Smith	–	—N/a	Cold/snow
1976	16 Apr	–	Pernod Rams	Toucon Terribles	–	–	—N/a	–
1977	8 Apr	9	Handcross Rebels	Wessex Wottsits	Jim Lay (W-W)	–	—N/a	Fine
1978	24 Mar	12	Brewery Shades	Ifield Musketeers	Bob Watts	–	—N/a	Fine
1979	13 Apr	9	Handcross Rebels	Talbots Tolleys	Barry Ray (H-Reb)	–	—N/a	Fine
1980	4 Apr	12	Black Dog Boozers	Bow Street Fudgers	Barry Ray	–	—N/a	Sunny
1981	17 Apr	16	Black Dog Boozers	Bow Street Fudgers	Paddy Graham	–	—N/a	Fine
1982	9 Apr	13	Bow Street Fudgers	Addington Alcos	Barry Ray	–	—N/a	Sunny
1983	9 Apr	13	Bow Street Fudgers	Handcross Rebels	Barry Ray	–	—N/a	Cold and wet
1984	17 Apr	19	Bow Street Fudgers	Black Dog Boozers	Paddy Graham	–	—N/a	Fine
1985	5 Apr	17	Black Dog Boozers	Bow Street Fudgers	Terry Gant	–	—N/a	Wet
1986	28 Mar	22	Black Dog Boozers	Bow Street Fudgers	Ian Gardner	–	—N/a	Fine
1987	17 Apr	25	Black Dog Boozers	Punters	Paddy Graham	Jackie Hodge	—N/a	Sunny
1988	1 Apr	26	Black Dog Boozers	Bow Street Fudgers	Colin Gardner(Bzrs)	Jen LeBon	—N/a	Fine
1989	24 Mar	28	Black Dog Boozers	Handcross Rebels	Paddy Graham	Eve Vine	—N/a	Fine
1990	13 Apr	22	Black Dog Boozers	Moonshiners	Tony Jones	Jackie Staples	—N/a	Wet
1991	29 Mar	28	Moonshiners	Black Dog Boozers	Darren Ray	Jen LeBon	—N/a	Fine
1992	17 Apr	22	TennKy Sharpshooters (United States)	Lions De Lyon (France)	Darren Ray	Eve Vine	—N/a	Wet
1993	9 Apr	17	Moonshiners	Handcross Rebels	Darren Ray	Jen LeBon	—N/a	Wet
1994	1 Apr	20	Black Dog Boozers	Handcross Rebels	Paddy Graham	Alison Ray	—N/a	Wet
1995	14 Apr	15	Barrel Scrapers	Black Dog Boozers	Paul Smith	Jen LeBon	—N/a	Sunny
1996	5 Apr	20	Black Dog Boozers	Moonshiners	Darren Ray	Alison Ray	—N/a	Dry
1997	28 Mar	21	Handcross 49ers	Black Dog Boozers	Colin Gardner(Bzrs)	Jen LeBon	—N/a	Sunny but windy
1998	10 Apr	17	Black Dog Boozers	Barrel Scrapers	'Monny' Simon Monahan	Jen LeBon	—N/a	Wet
1999	2 Apr	21	Black Dog Boozers	Handcross Rebels	Simon Monahan	Jen LeBon	—N/a	Fine/sunny
2000	21 Apr	20	Black Dog Boozers	Barrel Scrapers	Simon Monahan	Jen LeBon	—N/a	Fine/sunny
2001	13 Apr	19	Johnson Jets (England)	Handcross 49ers (England)	Mark Parsons (JJets)	Alison Reimer (H49ers)	—N/a	Fine/sunny
2002	29 Mar	22	Saxonia Globe Snippers (Germany)	Black Dog Boozers (England)	Benny Mehnert	Jen McGowan	Barry Ray	?
2003	18 Apr	20	Saxonia Globe Snippers (Germany)	1st MC Erzgebirge (Germany)	Chris Pampel	Jen McGowan	'Spud' Roy Gibson	?
2004	9 Apr	27	Saxonia Globe Snippers (Germany)	1st MC Erzgebirge (Germany)	Chris Pampel	Jen McGowan	Barry Ray	?
2005	25 Mar	23	Barrel Scrapers (England)	Handcross 49ers (England)	Simon Monahan (B-Scprs)	Susi Joswich (1st MCE II)	Barry Ray	?
2006	14 Apr	23	1st MC Erzgebirge (Germany)	Handcross 49ers (England)	Darren Ray (H-49ers)	Gabi Mühlisch (Sax II)	Will Aicheson	?
2007	6 Apr	23	1st MC Erzgebirge (Germany)	1st MC Erzgebirge II (Germany)	Darren Ray	Alison Reimer	Paul Smith	?
2008	21 Mar	21	Yorkshire Meds (England)	1st MC Erzgebirge (Germany)	Halim Tata (Y-Meds)	Leila Kara (Y-Meds)	Paul Smith	?
2009	10 Apr	16	Yorkshire Meds (England)	Handcross 49ers (England)	Halim Tata (Y-Meds)	Alison Reimer	Ian Gardner	?
2010	2 Apr	19	1st MC Erzgebirge (Germany)	Handcross 49ers (England)	Ian Gardner	Jen McGowan	Paul Smith	?
2011	22 Apr	19	Yorkshire Meds (England)	Handcross 49ers (England)	Chris Pampel	Leila Kara	Colin Gardner	?
2012	6 Apr	16	1st MC Erzgebirge (Germany)	Handcross 49ers (England)	Chris Pampel	Alison Reimer	Colin Gardner	?
2013	29 Mar	13	Black Dog Boozers (England)	Johnson Jets (England)	Chris Pampel	Alison Reimer	Paul Smith	?
2014	18 Apr	14	1st MC Erzgebirge (Germany)	Handcross 49ers (England)	Paul Smith	Leila Kara	Paul Smith	?
2015	3 Apr	19	1st MC Erzgebirge (Germany)	Johnson Jets (England)	Colin Gardner(BD-Boozers)	Alison Reimer	Paul Smith	?
2016	25 Mar	18	Yorkshire Meds (England)	Johnson Jets (England)	Paul Smith	Leila Kara		?
2017	14 Apr	15	Johnson Jets (England)	Yorkshire Meds (England)	Chris Pampel	Alison Reimer	Colin Gardner	?
2018	30 Mar	18	Saxonia Globe Snippers (Germany)	Johnson Jets (England)	Chris Pampel	Alison Reimer	Paul Smith	?
2019	19 Apr		1st MC Erzgebirge (Germany)	Black Dog Boozers (England)	Paul Smith	Whitney Lapic	Paul Smith	?
2020–2021	Cancelled (COVID-19)							
2022	15 Apr	12	Yorkshire Meds (England)	Black Dog Boozers (England)	Colin Gardner	Leila Kara	Halim Tata	?
2023	7 Apr		Black Dog Boozers (England)	1st MC Erzgebirge (Germany)	Dr. Frederik Ranck	Alison Reimer	Paul Smith	?
2024	29 Mar	12	Yorkshire Meds (England)	Black Dog Boozers (England)	Alex of 1st MCE 2	Alison Reimer	Mourad Kara	?
2025	18 Apr	?	1st MC Erzgebirge (Germany)	Black Dog Boozers (England)	Halim Tata	Alison Reimer	Halim Tata	?
2026	3 Apr	10	Turners Hill Tollymen (England)	1st MC Erzgebirge-2 (Germany)	Chris Pampel	Melanie Brandt	Les Barker	

== Roll of honour ==
Multiple Winners : Telcon/Toucon Terribles 19, Black Dog Boozers 14, Tinsley Green/ Tigers 8, 1st MC Erzgebirge 8, Yorkshire Meds 6, Saxonia Globe Snippers 4, Copthorne Sharpshooters 3, Bow Street Fudgers 3, Crawley Busmen 2, Copthorne Spitfires 2, Handcross Rebels 2, Moonshiners 2, Johnson Jets 2.
Multiple Finalists : Black Dog Boozers 24, Telcon/Toucon Terribles 20, Tinsley Green/ Tigers 14, 1st MC Erzgebirge 14, Johnson Jets 13, Handcross 49ers 9, Bow Street Fudgers 8, Handcross Rebels 7, Yorkshire Meds 7, Crawley Busmen 5, Arundel Mullets 4, Barrel Scrapers 4, Copthorne Sharpshooters 4, Copthorne Spitfires 4, Moonshiners 4, Saxonia Globe Snippers 4, Pernod Rams 3, Old Comrades 2.
Individual multiple Champions : Len Smith 12, Chris Pampel 8, Darren Ray 6, Wee Willie Wright 5, Alan Smith 5, Paddy Graham 5, Harry Langridge 4, Barry Ray 4, Simon Monahan 4, Paul Smith 4, Colin Gardner 4, Halim Tata 3, Ian Gardner 2, Cyril Wilcock 2, F.S.'Champ' Harding 2, Fred Rowe 2.
Individual Lady Champions : Alison Reimer(Ray) 13 , Jen McGowan(LeBon) 12, Leila Kara 5, Eve Vine 2, Jackie Staples(Hodge) 2, Susi Joswich 1, Gabi Mühlisch 1, Whitney Lapic 1. Melanie Brandt 1.
Golden Oldie Champions : Paul Smith 9, Barry Ray 3, Colin Gardner 3, Halim Tata 2, 'Spud' Roy Gibson 1, Will Aicheson 1, Ian Gardner 1, Mourad Kara 1. Les Barker 1.

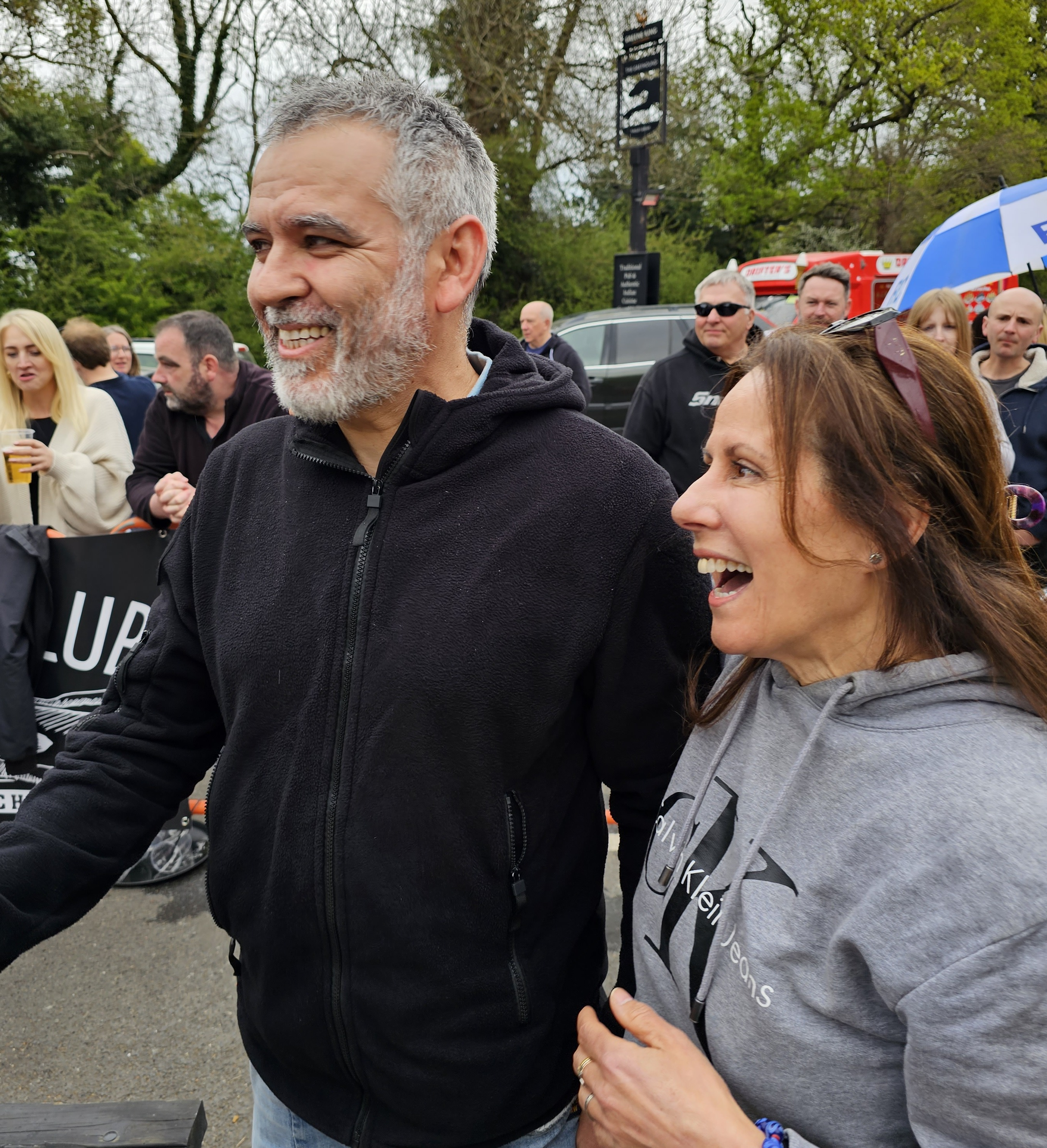
2025 Individual winner Halim Tata with Leila Kara of the Yorkshire Meds

== Celebrity involvement ==
- 1937 – Stanelli – Irish-born British musician, composer and comic entertainer and radio presenter
- 1947 – Laurel and Hardy – Comedy double act
- 1948 – Jack Warner (actor) – English film and television actor (Dixon of Dock Green)
- 1964 – Jackie Rae – Television presenter (The Golden Shot host)
- 1974 – Tricia Ingrams – TV news presenter (Capital Radio/ITN/Thames News)
- 1976 – Dave Allen – Irish comedian
- 1980–2000s – Chris Tarrant – TV & Radio presenter (Tiswas, Who Wants to Be a Millionaire? and Capital Radio Host)
- 1980–2000s – Tom Watt – Actor (Lofty from EastEnders) and Radio sports journalist
- 2003 - Chris Packham - BBC TV presenter for Inside Out (and various TV nature programmes).
- 2008 - Mayor of Crawley Councillor Sally Blake, unveiled a blue heritage plaque from Crawley Arts Council.
- 2009 – Rory McGrath – Comedian and writer and captain on They Think It's All Over (TV series)
- 2009 – Paddy McGuinness – Comedian and TV presenter of Take Me Out (UK game show)
- 2009 – Crawley’s Mayor and Mayoress Councillor Dr Howard & Mrs Sue Bloom visited in the rain.
- 2010 - Mayor of Crawley Councillor Brenda Burgess came along.
- 2015 – Henning Wehn – German comedian on Germany winning the World Marbles Championship (at 2 mins 40 seconds)
- 2021 - Marbles was chosen as an event in the popular Netflix survival drama Squid Game.
- 2023 - Henry Smith - Mayor of, and MP for Crawley.
- 2026 - The event was motioned in the Parliament of the United Kingdom, having been put forward by Crawley MP Peter Lamb, and was supported by a further 4 MPs.

== Other marble tournaments ==
National Marbles Tournament (United States)

== External video links ==
- 1938 British and World Marbles championship video preview by British Pathé
- 1941 British and World Marbles championship video preview by British Pathé
- 1962 British and World Marbles championship video preview by British Pathé
- 2008 British and World Marbles championship video by YouTube
- 2011 British and World Marbles championship video by YouTube
- 2013 British and World Marbles championship video by YouTube
- 2015 British and World Marbles championship video by BYN TV News on YouTube
- 2015 British and World Marbles championship video by World Wide weird on YouTube
- 2016 British and World Marbles championship video by Britclip on YouTube
- 2017 British and World Marbles championship video by Trans World Sport on YouTube
- 2018 British and World Marbles championship video by Britclip on YouTube
- 2019 British and World Marbles championship video by Britclip on YouTube
- 2022 British and World Marbles championship video by Britclip on YouTube
- 2023 British and World Marbles championship video by Britclip on YouTube
- 2024 British and World Marbles championship video by Britclip on YouTube
- 2026 British and World Marbles championship video by France24 on YouTube
