= Aggravation (board game) =

Strategy board game, variant of Pachisi

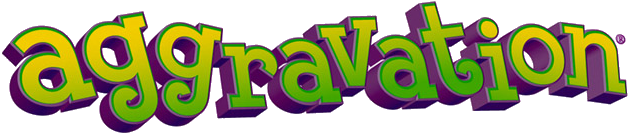

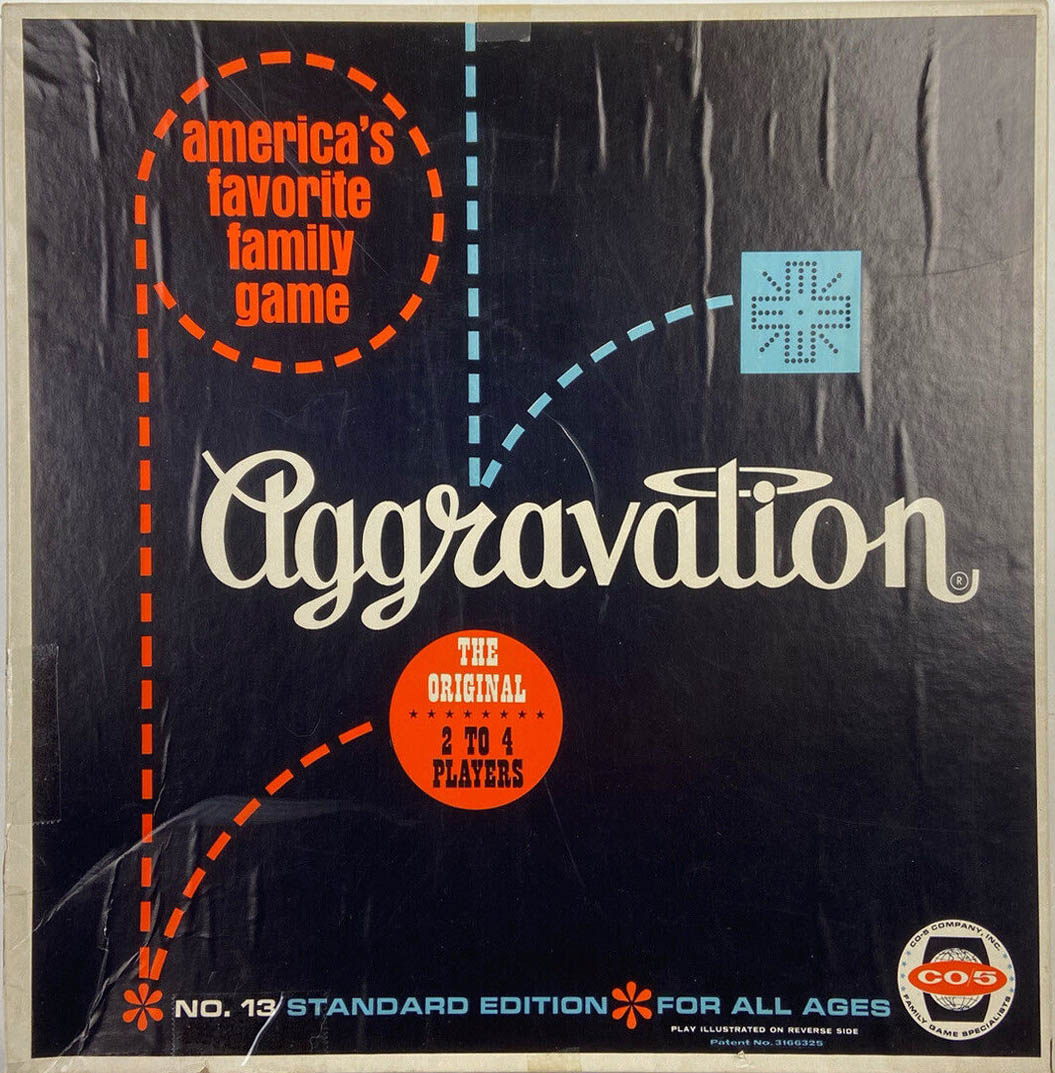
- Cover of a 1962 edition by CO-5
- Other names: Marble Out: The Fun Game
- Designers: BERL Industries (Note: BERL Industries was a group of four long-time friends; the name was derived from their first names. It consisted of: Bob (Robert C.) O'Kelley (1920–1984) (?), Emma (?), Rudy (Rudolph) Clement Malchar (1919–1970) (?), and Lois Elaine Hazel Thomas (1928–2006).)
- Publishers: CO-5 Company; Lakeside Industries; Parker Brothers; Hasbro; Winning Games
- Publication: 1962; 64 years ago
- Years active: 1962–Present
- Genres: Board game
- Languages: English
- Players: 2–6
- Playing time: 45 minutes
- Age range: 6+
- Skills: Strategy, probability

Aggravation is a board game for up to four players and later versions for up to six players, whose object is to be the first player to have all four playing pieces (usually represented by marbles) reach the player's home section of the board. The game's name comes from the action of capturing an opponent's piece by landing on its space, which is known as "aggravating". The name was coined by one of the creators, Louis Elaine, who did not always enjoy defeat.

== History and overview ==
The name Aggravation was trademarked by BERL Industries, which filed its application on April 10, 1959. A contemporary patent filed by Howard P. Wilde, Sr. two months earlier, in February 1959, describes a game board "which may be played, with high interest, vexation and aggravation by two, three or four persons" but does not provide specific gameplay instructions for the cross-shaped track and central space. The 1959 Wilde patent, in turn, cites an earlier patent filed in 1921 by Isidor Paris for a child's racing game, also featuring a cross-shaped track and describing how players move their markers along the track by taking turns rolling a six-sided die. However, the first version of Aggravation, published in 1962, follows the design described by Harry W. First in a patent filed in 1962 and granted in 1965; that patent does not provide specific instructions for gameplay.

Aggravation compared with earlier games
Inventor Characteristic	Paris (1921)	Wilde (1959)	First (1962)
US Patent	1,406,484	3,116,928	3,166,325
Board			
Players	2–4		
Pieces per player	5	4	
Track length (Note: Full length of the track before entering the home area, assuming no shortcuts are taken)	72	52	
Direction of play	Clockwise	Not described	
Central shortcut	No	Maybe	
"Aggravation" mechanic	No	Maybe	

BERL licensed the game for royalties of 1 penny per game sold. The license was previously held by Milton Bradley and Parker Bros. Today, it is manufactured by Hasbro. The children and grandchildren of the creators still hold rights to all game boards and sales.

Its distinctive features are that the track accommodates from four to six players, unlike other Pachisi-like games which only allow four; that it is normally drilled to accept colored glass marbles as playing pieces; and that it incorporates "shortcuts". There are no "safe" holes where a player's marbles cannot be captured (or "aggravated", in the game's parlance) other than the player's own base and home sections.

=== Versions ===
The original edition of the game, as described by First in the 1965 patent, accommodated two to four players, using a four-armed track. A "deluxe party edition" was released in the early 1960s for two to six players, using a six-armed track. At about the same time, the "Joltz" variant for up to three players was added, using a three-armed track and faster gameplay with a reduced set of three marbles per player. In 1971, a "split-level" edition was released with essentially the same track as the "party" edition, except the track was split into two tiers of three arms each and tier rotation and movement mechanics were introduced. Later, the original edition was discontinued and the six-armed "party" edition became the standard game board.

Older versions of the game usually feature a board which is perfectly symmetrical and identical in shape and size from all angles. However, modern versions of the game produced by Parker Brothers are made in an irregular pattern with a shape that varies for each player, though all players must travel an equal number of spaces in order to reach their respective home sections.

== Sequence of play ==
Aggravation game board schematics

"Joltz" 2–3 players

"Original" 2–4 players

"Party" 2–6 players

All versions of the game board feature a starting base area outside the track and a home area within the track; both are marked as a line of colored cells. A player wins when they are able to move all (three or four, depending on the variant) of their marbles from the base onto the track via that player's colored starting point, then moves the marbles clockwise along the track to the home area safely without being captured by another player. The exact location of the starting point may vary according to the version, but it is usually placed so that each player's marble must traverse the entire length of the track, i.e., the player is allowed to enter the home area only from the space immediately anti-clockwise of the starting point. However, the center shortcut may be used to shorten this route under certain conditions.

The game starts with each player placing four (or three) marbles in their "base". After the order of play is determined through the rolling of the die, each player rolls a single die on their turn to determine the number of spaces to move.

- All marbles remain in the base until either a 1 or 6 is rolled, which entitles the player to move a marble from the base to their "start".
- If the player already has one or more marbles on the track, when that player rolls a 1 or a 6, they have a choice of either moving another marble to the start, or moving a marble already on the track.
- The start cannot be occupied by more than one marble. That is, if there is already a marble on the starting space and the player rolls a 1 or a 6, they must move the marble from the start rather than moving another marble to the start.
- If the player rolls a 6 then they are entitled to take another turn.

The winner is the first player whose pieces all reach home by exact count. If playing as paired partners, when the player has all their marbles in home, then they can roll to help get their partner's marbles home faster.

=== Shortcuts ===
The hole in the center of the four-armed board is known as the "shortcut". A player who is able to land a marble in this location by exact count has the possibility of taking a route even faster to home. The shortcut, though, has the drawback in that it may only be exited (to one of the four corner spaces nearest the center) by rolling a 1.

For the six-armed board introduced with the deluxe party version, the center hole is known as the "super shortcut" and follows the same rules as the four-armed board, with an exact roll required to enter and a roll of 1 required to exit to one of the six closest corners. The six corner holes closest to the center hole are designated the "shortcut" holes for this version. A player landing exactly on one of those six holes may choose to move directly along those holes on their next turn. If a player is already on one of the six corner holes, the only way to enter the "super shortcut" center hole is by rolling a 1.

=== Aggravating ===
A player who lands a marble on a space occupied by an opponent's marble "aggravates" that opponent's piece which was landed on and sends it back to that opposing player's base. A player's piece may not be aggravated if it is on the player's home or base areas, as these are safe from aggravation. However, a player's start space is not specified as protected.

Players are prohibited from landing on or passing their own marble. If it happens that they cannot move the full die roll, then they can not move. If a 6 is rolled, another roll can be taken. If playing teams, the player cannot land on or pass their partner. If, however, there are multiple marbles, the player cannot jump over or aggravate a marble in the middle or front.

== Reviews ==
- Games and Puzzles
- The Playboy Winner's Guide to Board Games
