= Josh Simpson (glass artist) =

American glass artist (born 1949)

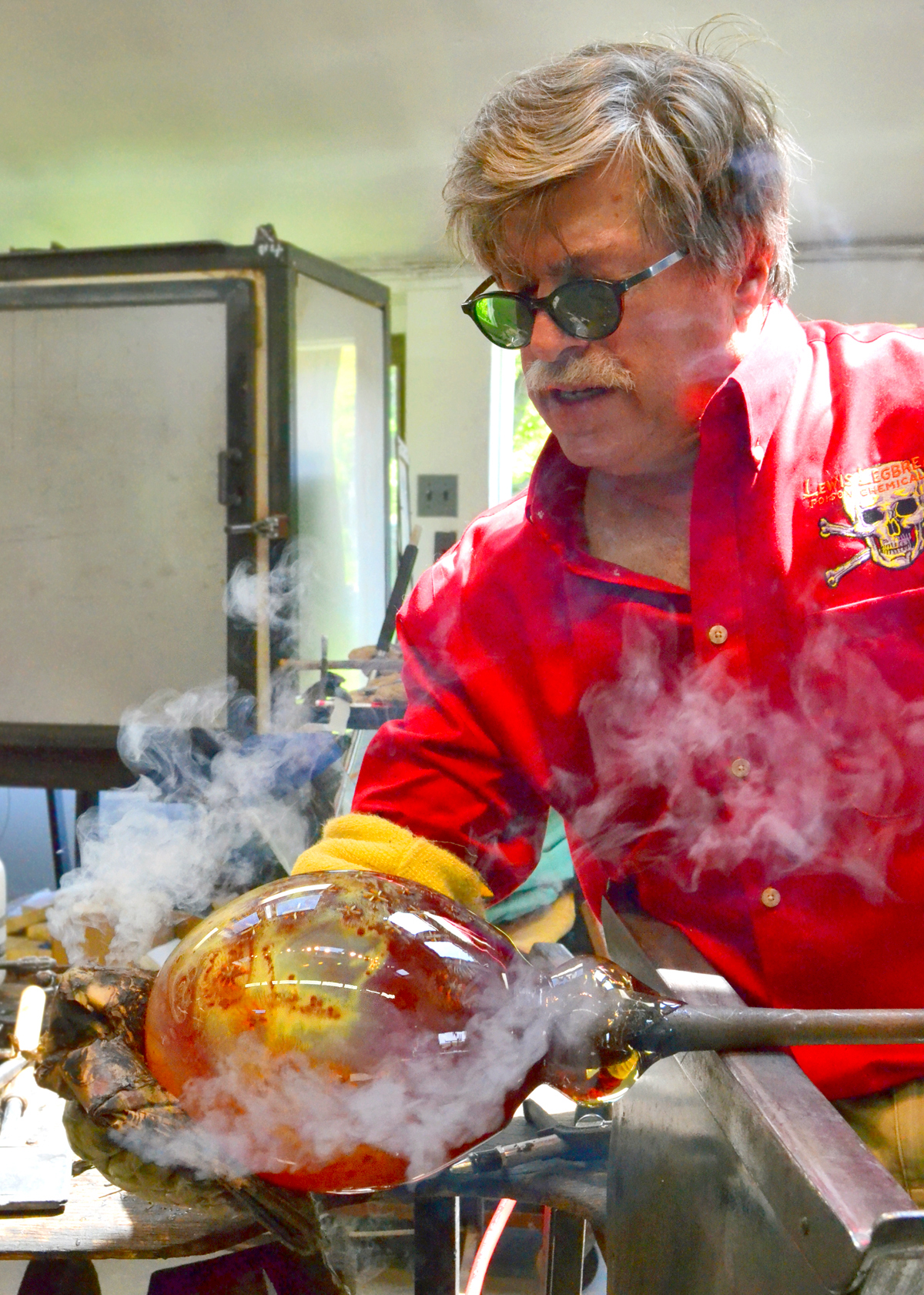
- Josh Simpson
- Born: August 17, 1949 (age 76); New Haven, Connecticut, U.S.
- Known for: Glass artist
- Spouse: Catherine Coleman

Josh Simpson (born August 17, 1949) is an American glass artist known for his glass "planet" forms. Developed beginning in the mid-1970s, these works range from small paperweights to large-scale pieces such as Megaplanet, commissioned by the Corning Museum of Glass in 2005. His work often draws on themes of outer space and the natural world and incorporates techniques such as layered glass, metal foils, and trapped air. Simpson has exhibited widely, and his work is held in major museum collections.

== Early life and education ==
Simpson was born August 17, 1949, in New Haven, Connecticut.

He graduated from the Kent School, a preparatory school, in 1968. He began working with glass in 1972 while a student at Hamilton College in New York, where he studied psychology. During a winter term, he practiced glassblowing in Vermont, an experience that led him to pursue glassmaking as a career. He later completed his degree in psychology at Hamilton College.

== Career ==
In 1976, Simpson acquired property in Shelburne, Massachusetts, where his studio is based. He later began developing his planet forms after creating marble-sized examples for a glassblowing demonstration, inspired in part by images from the Apollo 8 mission.

Simpson has taught at the Penland School of Crafts, the Haystack Mountain School of Crafts, and Aichi University in Japan. He has exhibited widely, including solo exhibitions such as Galactic Landscapes at the Berkshire Museum (2018–2019), and has been the subject of retrospective exhibitions reflecting his five-decade career. In 2022, the publication Josh Simpson: 50 Years of Visionary Glass accompanied exhibitions examining his work and its relationship to science and the studio glass movement.

== Artistic style ==
Simpson is known for his glass "planet" forms, which he began developing in the mid-1970s. Originally created as small demonstration pieces, they became a central focus of his work, ranging from small paperweights to large-scale works such as Megaplanet, commissioned by the Corning Museum of Glass in 2005. He also experiments with materials and techniques including colored glass canes, metal foils, and trapped air, and has developed additional bodies of work using materials he refers to as "New Mexico glass" and "Tektite glass."

== Public collections ==
Simpson's work is held in the permanent collections of more than twenty museums, including the Corning Museum of Glass, Corning, New York; the Royal Ontario Museum; The Renwick Gallery, Washington, DC and the Yale University Art Gallery, New Haven, Connecticut.

== Personal life ==
Simpson lives in Massachusetts. He is married to the American astronaut Catherine Coleman, and they have two children.
