= Archimedean Excogitation =

Kinetic sculpture by George Rhoads

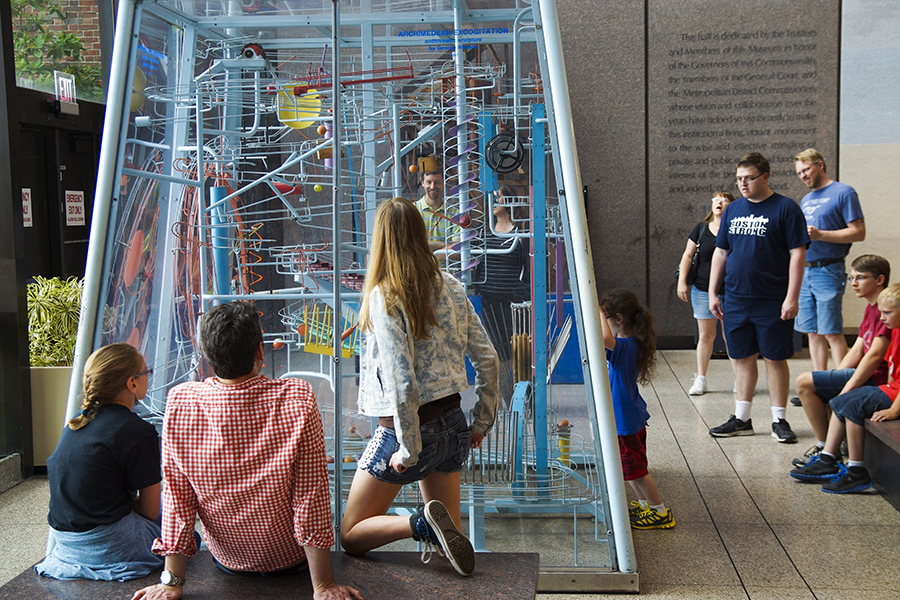
- Visitors observing the sculpture in 2014
- Artist: George Rhoads
- Year: 1987
- Medium: Metal and assorted other materials
- Movement: Kinetic art
- Dimensions: 8.2 m × 2.4 m × 2.4 m (27 ft × 8 ft × 8 ft)
- Location: Museum of Science; Boston, Massachusetts, United States
- Website: georgerhoads.com/portfolio/31

Archimedean Excogitation is a 1987 audiokinetic rolling ball sculpture by George Rhoads. It is located in the atrium of the Museum of Science in Boston.

== Description ==
External videos
- Archimedean Excogitation in operation

Archimedean Excogitation consists of a metal and glass display case framing a system of nine tracks on two main levels. The lower level tracks contain billiard balls, which encounter a series of mechanical obstacles as they roll, some of which (such as a drum and xylophone) produce noise. The upper level tracks contain larger duckpin bowling balls, which push windmill blades and encounter similar obstacles. In total, the sculpture has slightly fewer than 30 moving or sound-producing components, and is 27 feet (8.2 m) tall.

== Construction ==
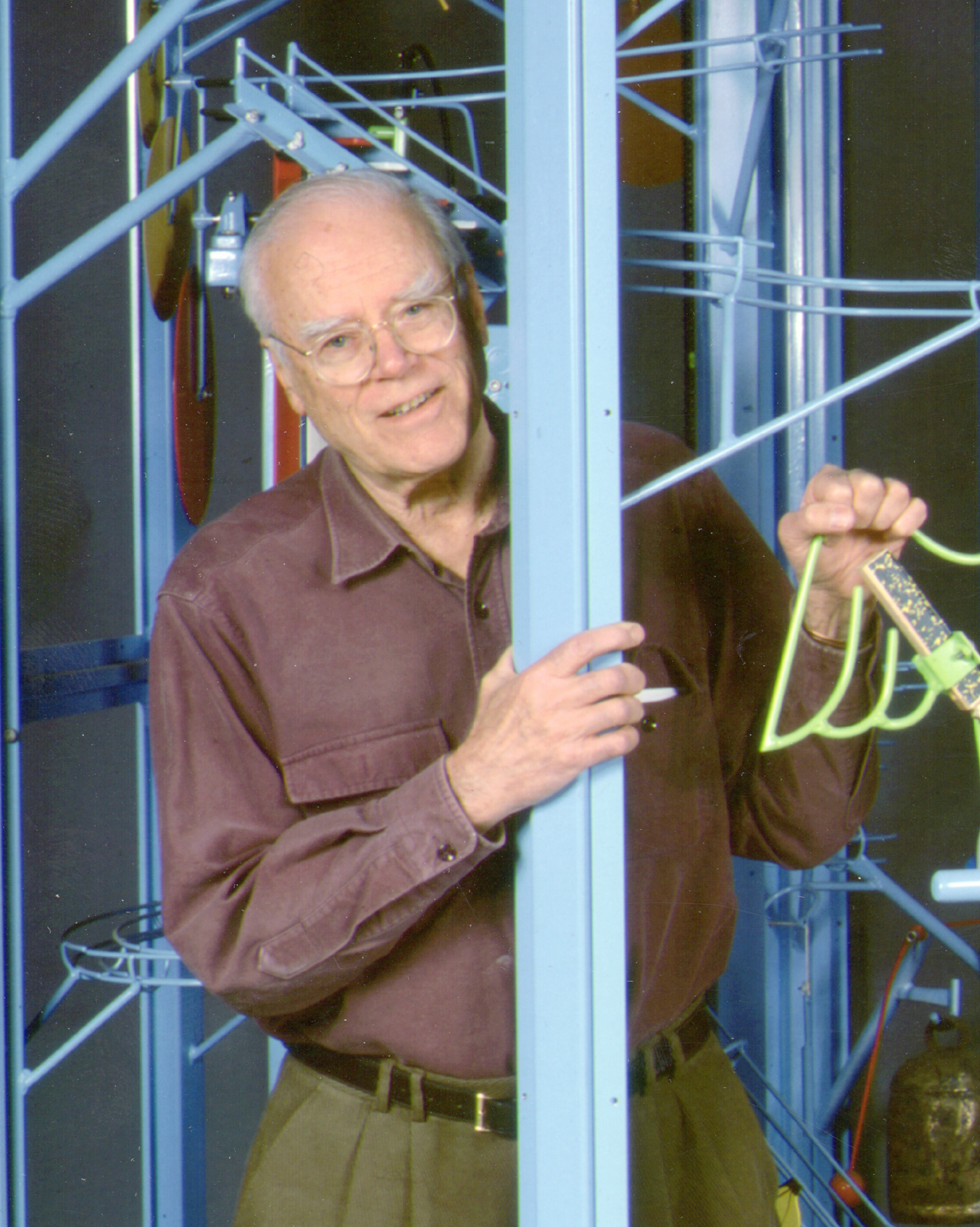
George Rhoads in 2008

Archimedean Excogitation was commissioned for the Museum of Science in Boston, with a budget of $536,100. It was designed by George Rhoads, with assistance from Rock Stream Studios, and was installed in 1987.

In 2015, the sculpture was refurbished and moved from the museum's lower lobby to its atrium.

== Reception ==
Archimedean Excogitation has been a popular attraction for museumgoers. Metta Winter, writing for The Christian Science Monitor, described it as "a noisy, unpredictable affair observers find hard to walk away from". Hayley Kaufman, writing for The Boston Globe, called it "seemingly unstoppable [and] delightfully complex". It is associated with the kinetic art movement.

The sculpture is used by the museum as an educational tool to help illustrate the principles of physics and mechanical devices. It was featured on a 1999 episode of Mister Rogers' Neighborhood.

== See also ==
- Rube Goldberg machine
