= Dundee Observer =

Weekly American newspaper

The Dundee Observer
- Type: Weekly Newspaper
- Owner(s): Finger Lakes Media., Inc.
- Publisher: George Lawson
- Founded: 1878
- Headquarters: Yates County, New York
- Circulation: 2,150 copies
- OCLC number: 14121206
- Website: http://www.observer-review.com/

The Dundee Observer is a newspaper in Dundee, New York that is published every Wednesday. The newspaper's circulation is an estimated 2,150 copies. The Dundee Observer is owned by Finger Lakes Media., Inc. and published by George Lawson.

The Dundee Observer belongs to both the National Newspaper Association as well as the New York Press Association.

== History ==
The newspaper was founded on June 20, 1878. In 1998, George Lawson bought the newspaper alongside the Watkins Glenn Review and Express. Subsequent to Lawson's purchase, the newspaper's coverage broadened and the company opened up buildings in two locations, Dundee and Penn Yan.

The business and success of the Dundee Observer forced its one time competitor, the Dundee Record, to pick up and move to Corning, New York.

A total of nine employees work for the newspaper. Mr. Lawson, the publisher, runs the business. His wife, Debra, is currently employed as the business manager of the Dundee Observer and the Watkins Glenn Review and Express. Lawson's son, Brandon, works as the newspaper's primary photographer and was also quintessential to the creation of the Dundee Observer's online website.

Additional members of the newspaper include Rikki Marcin, who has worked for the newspaper since Lawson took over in 1998. Clara Pinckney has been a reporter for the newspaper since 1973. Furthermore, historian Barbara Hope Smith Bell started to write for the Dundee Observer in 1952, and in 2003 she established a section of the paper devoted to neighborhood history.

Artist and one time Dundee resident George Rhoads produced comic strips for the paper such as that of "Big Mouse," a cartoon rodent.

The newspaper's yearly revenue intake is reported to be less than $500,000.

== Coverage ==
For over 140 years, the newspaper has provided Yates county readers local coverage on numerous topics including reports on criminal activity, economic growth, weddings, and fatalities. The newspaper also offers coverage of nearby high school sports teams and town politics. Each issue also includes several advertisements and removable coupons from local grocers and businesses.

On June 24, 1881, the Dundee Observer reported on a fire that spread through the city streets causing $25,000 in damages. Among the notable Dundee buildings to be consumed by the fire was the Dundee Opera House.

Local assemblyman Phil Palmesano describes the Dundee Observer's local reporting as a tremendous cornerstone to many community residents. He declares that many "look forward to reading the weekly edition of The [Dundee] Observer for important news and information to help let [us] know what's happening right here."

Throughout the years, however, the Dundee Observer has also touched on national news. For example, in 1942, the paper published a letter from the perspective of a former conscientious objector who now believed that it was his responsibility join the United States war effort.

== Awards ==
In the National Newspaper Association's "2016 Better Newspaper Editorial Contest" the Dundee Observer took home a number of distinctions. They were allotted the first place prize in the category of "Best Photo Essay" for their report on the 2015 "NASCAR weekend." Furthermore, Brandon Lawson received an "honorable mention" recognition within the category of "Best Sports Photo."

In 2018, the New York State Legislator recognized the 140th year of the Dundee Observer and praised its accomplishments.
