= Museum of Science (Boston) =

Museum of Science, Boston
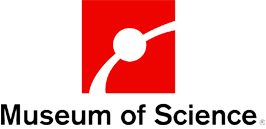

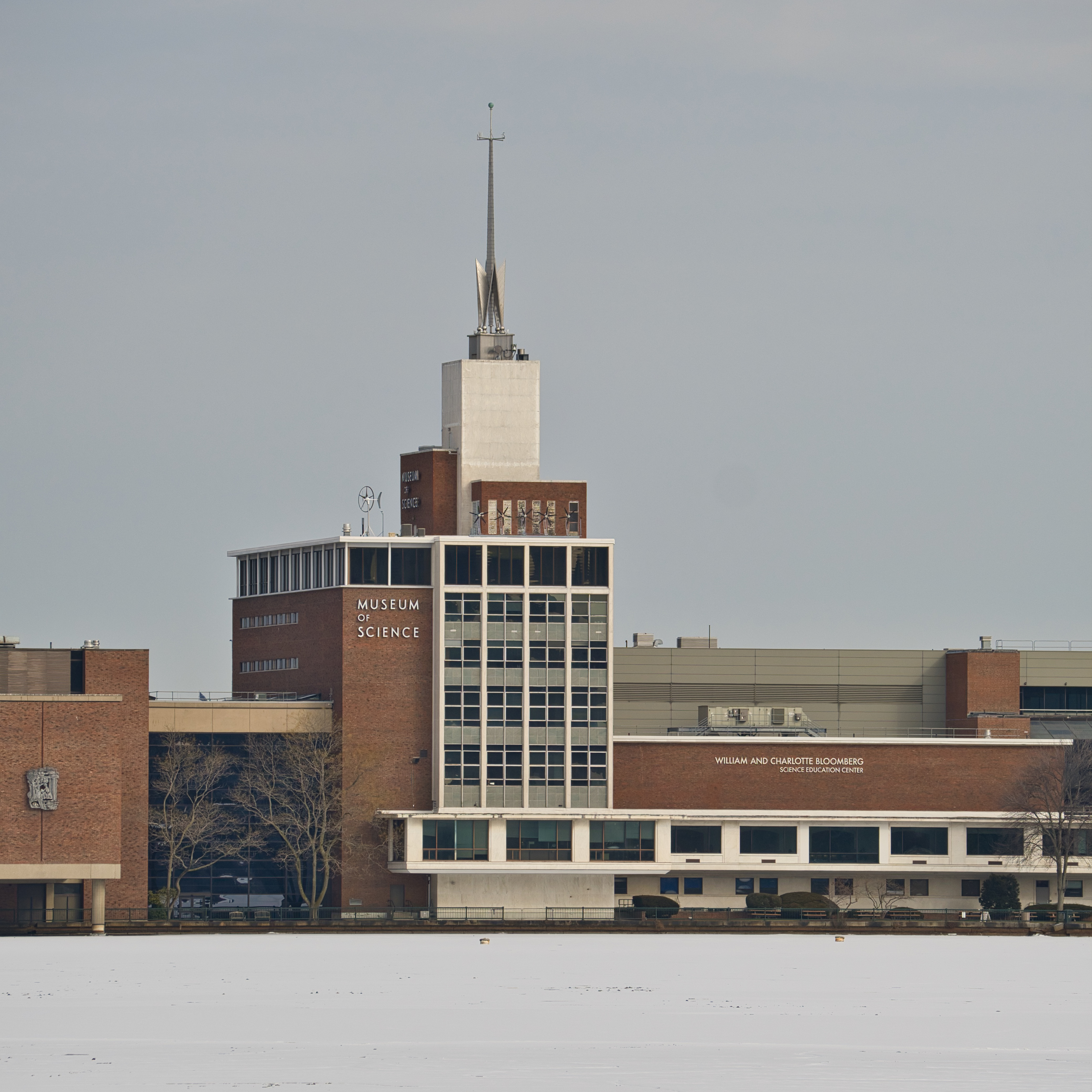
- View from Cambridge; the central Yawkey Gallery on the Charles River overlooks the river basin in the foreground
- Established: 1830
- Location: Boston, Massachusetts
- Coordinates: 42°22′03″N 71°04′16″W
- Type: Science museum Indoor zoo
- Accreditation: AAM, ASTC, AZA
- Visitors: 1.53 million (2016)
- Director: Tim Ritchie
- Public transit access: Green Line Science Park station
- Parking: Dedicated parking garage (fee)
- Website: mos.org

The Museum of Science (MoS) is a nature and science museum and indoor zoological establishment located in Science Park, a plot of land in Boston and Cambridge, Massachusetts, spanning the Charles River. Along with over 700 interactive exhibits, the museum features a number of live and interactive presentations throughout the building each day, along with scheduled film showings at the Charles Hayden Planetarium and the Mugar Omni Theater (New England's only domed IMAX theater).

The Museum is a member of the Association of Science and Technology Centers (ASTC) and the American Alliance of Museums (AAM). Additionally, the Museum of Science is an accredited member of the Association of Zoos and Aquariums (AZA), being home to over 100 animals.

== History ==
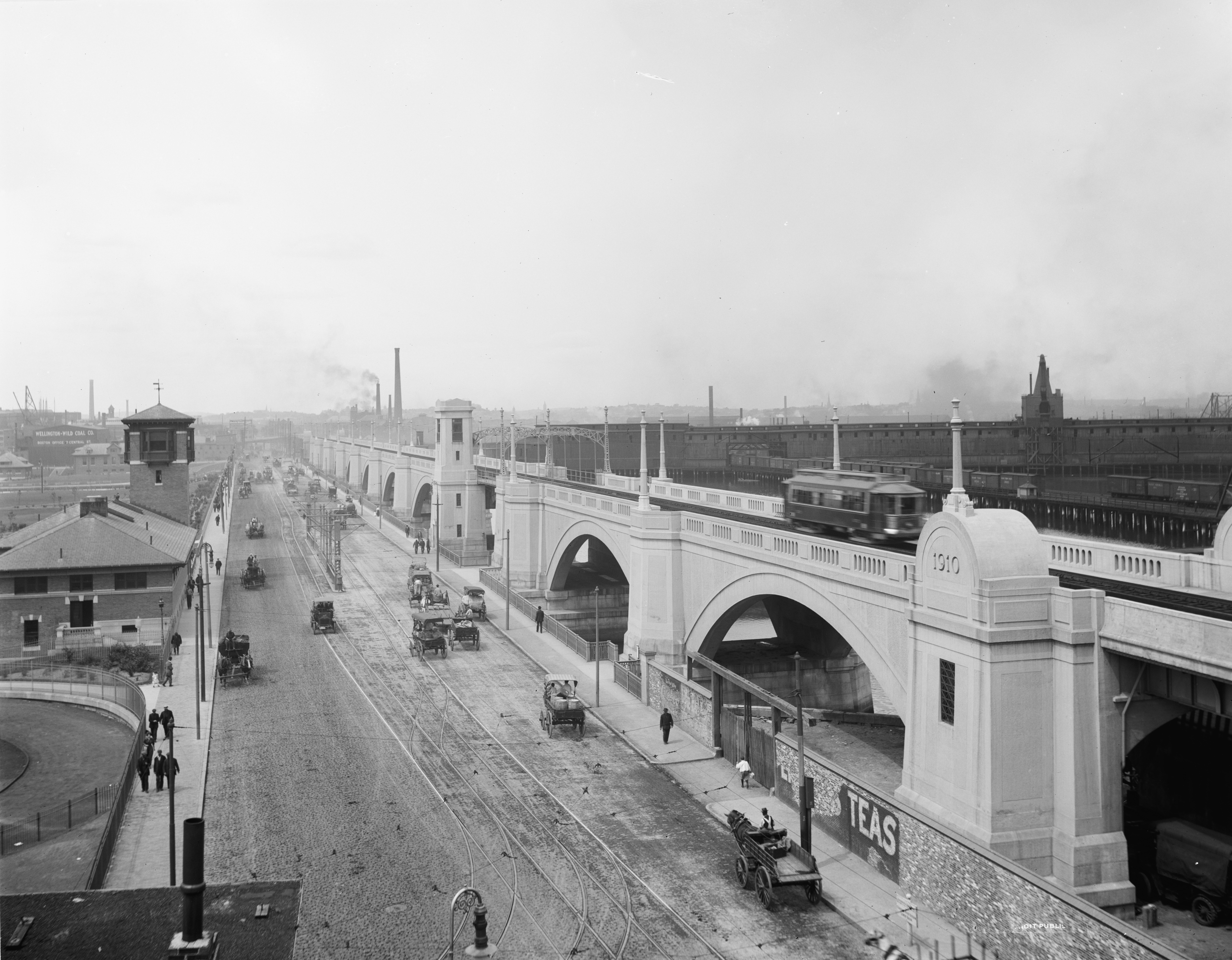
Lechmere Viaduct in the 1910s. The museum was later constructed behind the Metropolitan Police Station on the left.

=== Origin and early years ===
The museum began as the Boston Society of Natural History in 1830, founded by a collection of men who wished to share scientific interests. Their first meeting was held on February 9, 1830 with seven original members in attendance: Walter Channing, Benjamin D. Greene, George Hayward, John Ware, Edward Brooks, Amos Binney, and George B. Emerson. It was more commonly called the Boston Museum of Natural History in the 19th century, and this name occurs frequently in the literature. In 1862, after the society had gone through several temporary facilities, a building was constructed in the Back Bay area of the city and dubbed the New England Museum of Natural History.

The museum was located next to the original Rogers Building of the Massachusetts Institute of Technology (MIT), and both neoclassical structures were designed by William G. Preston. The original MIT building was demolished in 1939, but the Natural History Museum building survives today, repurposed as a home furnishings showcase.

A great deal of scientific work was done by the society, especially around geology, and the results of this work can be found in the Proceedings of the Boston Society of Natural History which are now freely available online. A library and children's rooms were added to the museum around 1900. It was renamed the Museum of Science in 1939, under the directorship of Henry Bradford Washburn, Jr., a renowned American mountaineer.

The Boston Museum of Natural History of 1830/1864–1945 should not be confused with the private Warren Museum of Natural History (1858–1906, formerly on Chestnut Street in Boston). The contents of the latter collection, including the first intact mastodon, were relocated to the American Museum of Natural History of New York City in 1906.

Museum Then and Now, an exhibit of artifacts from the early years of the society, is located near the second floor Blue Wing entrance to the Theater of Electricity in today's museum. (This exhibit was closed in 2025 during a museum renovation).

=== Post WWII ===
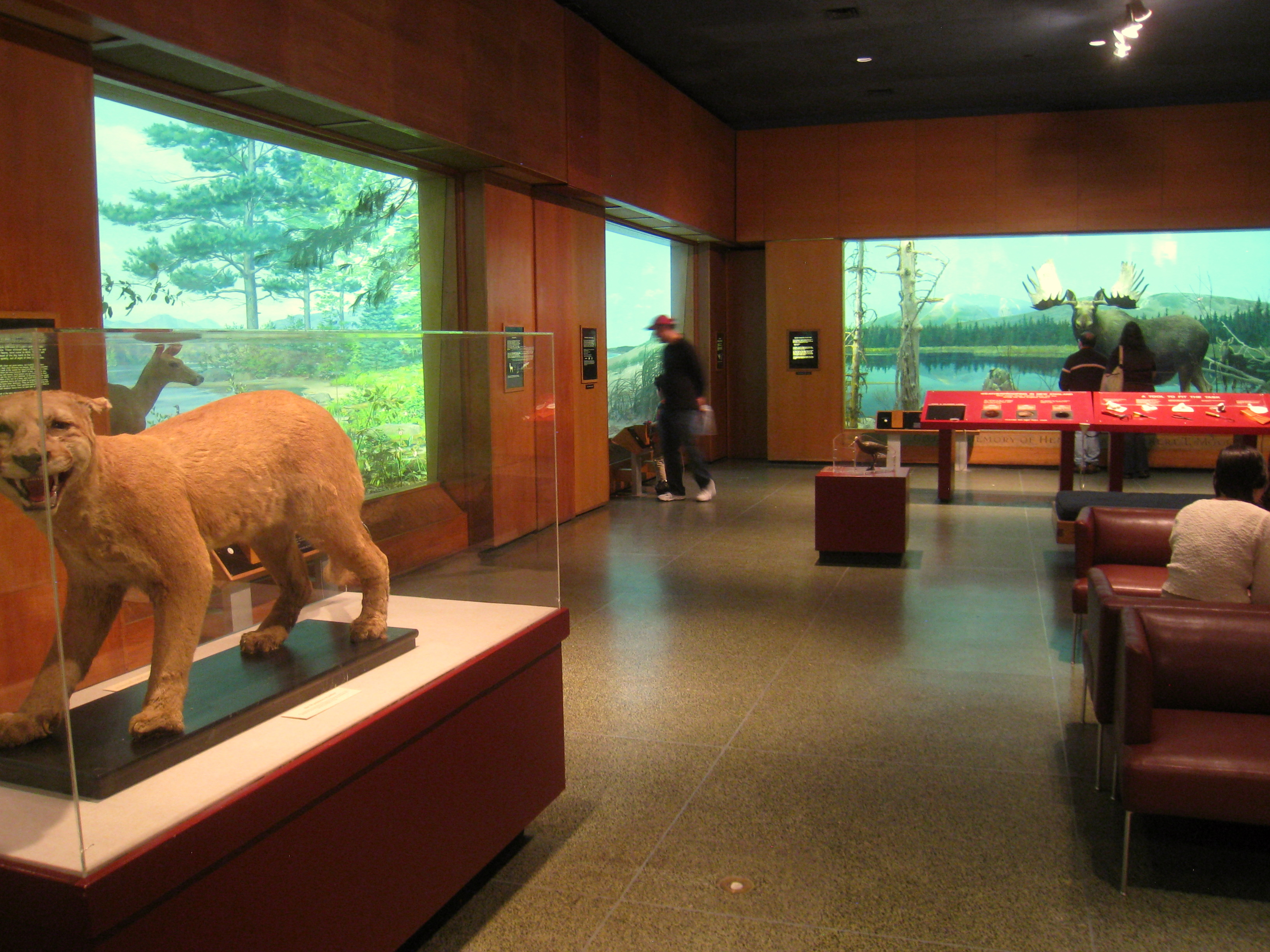
New England Habitats dioramas

After World War II, the old Museum of Science building was sold, and the museum was relocated, again under the name Boston Museum of Science. Under the leadership of Bradford Washburn, the society negotiated with the Metropolitan District Commission for a 99-year lease of the land on the Charles River Dam Bridge, now known as Science Park. The museum pays $1 a year to the state for use of the land. Construction and development began in 1948, and the museum opened in 1951, arguably the first all-encompassing science museum in the country.

In these first few years, the museum developed a traveling planetarium, a version of which is still brought to many elementary schools in the Greater Boston area every year. They also obtained during these early years "Spooky", a great horned owl who became a symbol or mascot of the museum; he lived to age 38, the longest any great horned owl is known to have lived. Today, a number of other taxidermed specimens remain on display, teaching children about the animals of New England and of the world.

Science Park station was opened as an infill station on what is now the MBTA Green Line in August 1955, allowing easier access to the museum by public transportation. In 1955, the Massachusetts Institute of Technology donated its Round Hill generator and its enclosure to the museum. It became the centerpiece of a Theater of Electricity, which began running daily demonstrations in 1980. The Charles Hayden Planetarium, a permanent building, was opened in 1958.

Many more expansions continued into the 1970s and 1980s. In 1999, The Computer Museum in Boston closed and became part of the Museum of Science, integrating some of its educational displays, although most of the historical artifacts were moved to the Computer History Museum in Mountain View, California.

=== 21st century ===
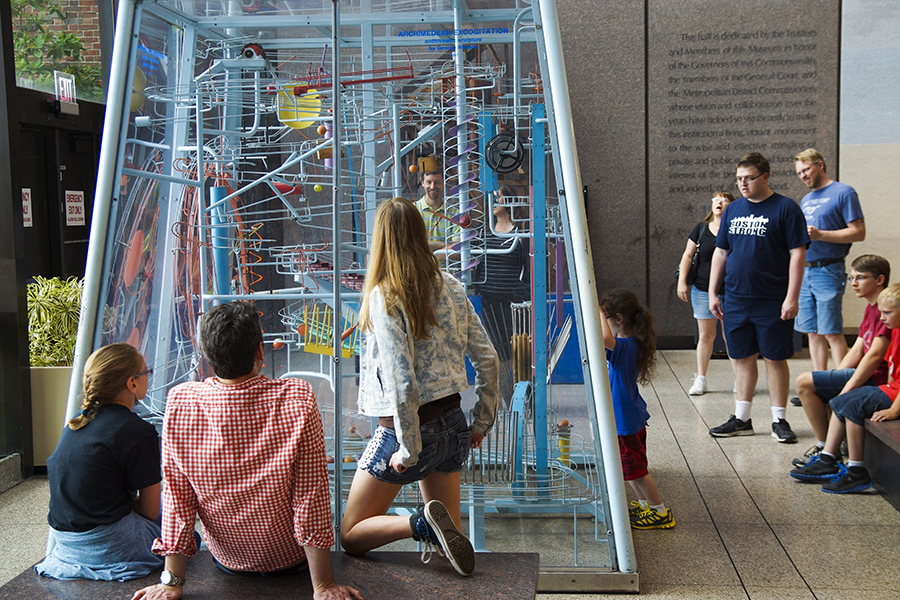
Archimedean Excogitation in 2014

A major renovation and expansion took place during 2005 and 2006. In 2010, the Charles Hayden Planetarium was closed for renovation, and has since reopened.

The main entrance to the museum straddles the border between the cities of Boston and Cambridge, and the boundary is indicated by a marker embedded in the floor inside the museum. In 2013, the Museum of Science was the venue for the first joint session of the Boston and Cambridge city councils, to discuss policy measures to improve retention of talented recent university graduates in the area.

Starting in 2013, the Museum of Science undertook a major renovation to upgrade its physical structure, and to develop new educational content. A $250 million campaign upgraded nearly half of the exhibit halls from 2012, and opened three new major exhibits: the Hall of Human Life, the Yawkey Gallery on the Charles River, and What Is Technology? The Hall of Human Life opened in November 2013 in the newly expanded Level 2 of the Green Wing, and has a focus on human biology. The audio kinetic sculpture Archimedean Excogitation was moved to the atrium to make way for a new exhibit in the lower lobby called the Yawkey Gallery on the Charles River. This exhibit opened in 2016, creating a new entry to the museum with better views of the Charles River and Boston-Cambridge skyline.

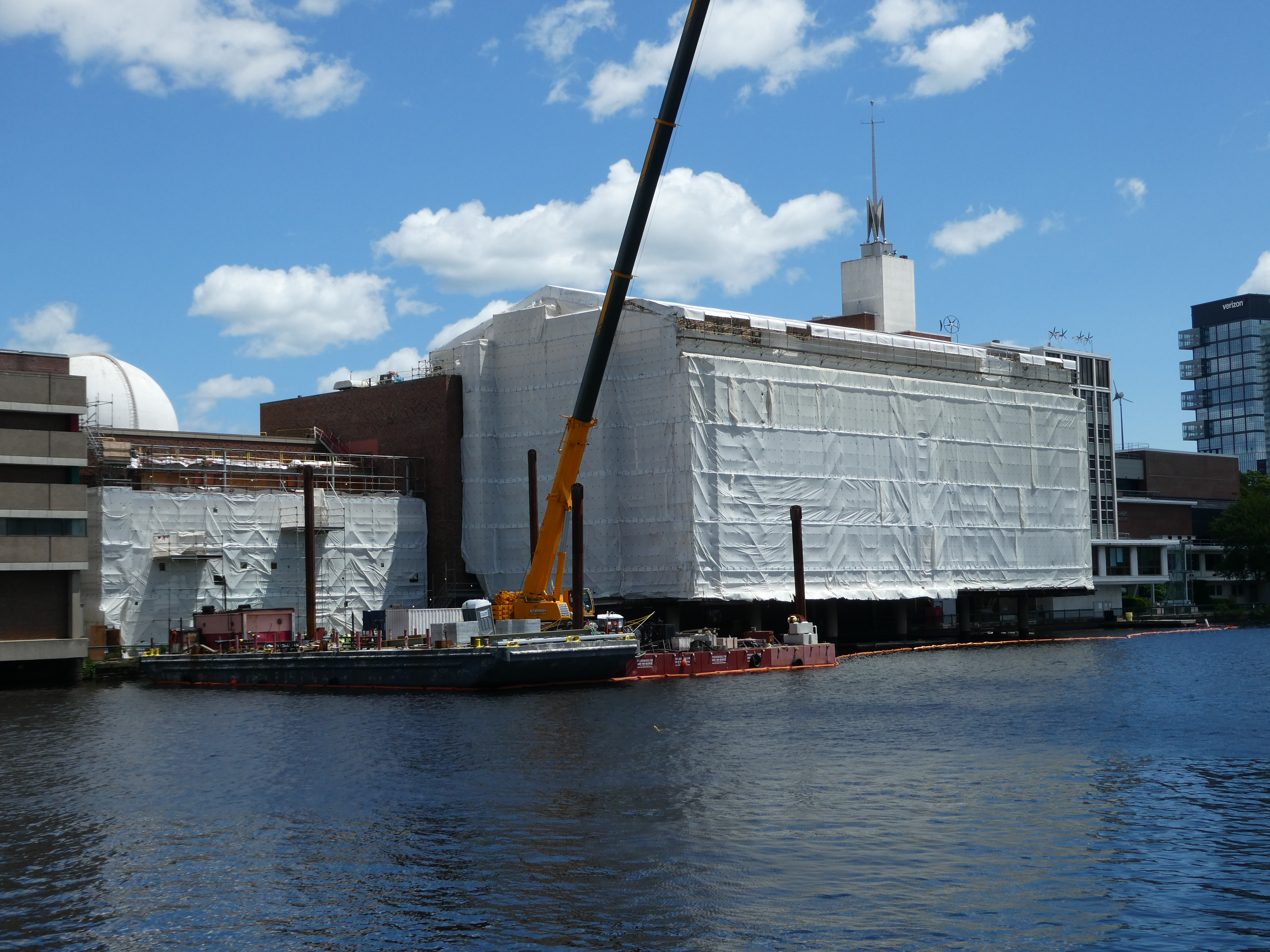
Renovation work seen in 2025

On October 18, 2016 former mayor of New York City Michael Bloomberg revealed that his foundation, Bloomberg Philanthropies, would donate $50 million to the museum, the largest gift in the institution's 186-year history. He grew up in nearby Medford, and his donation is focused on expanding the educational programs of the museum.

In 2024, the museum started construction of a Public Science Common, to be located where the Cahners Auditorium previously existed. This is a new, flexible meeting space enclosed in glass, and replaces an earlier windowless physical volume which had turned a blank wall to the Charles River. The new space will serve as a central hub for three Centers for Public Science Learning -- the Center for Life Sciences, the Center for the Environment, and the Center for Space Sciences. Lead funding is by Bloomberg Philanthropies, and the project is planned for completion in 2026.

=== Future ===
In front of the museum, a memorial to Leonard Nimoy, the television and movie actor who grew up nearby in the West End of Boston, is planned for installation. The monumental sculpture will be a larger-than-life 20-foot (6.1 m) representation of a hand displaying Nimoy's iconic "live long and prosper" gesture. Co-sponsored by Nimoy's family, the project is at least 75% funded as of November 2024.

== Exhibit halls ==
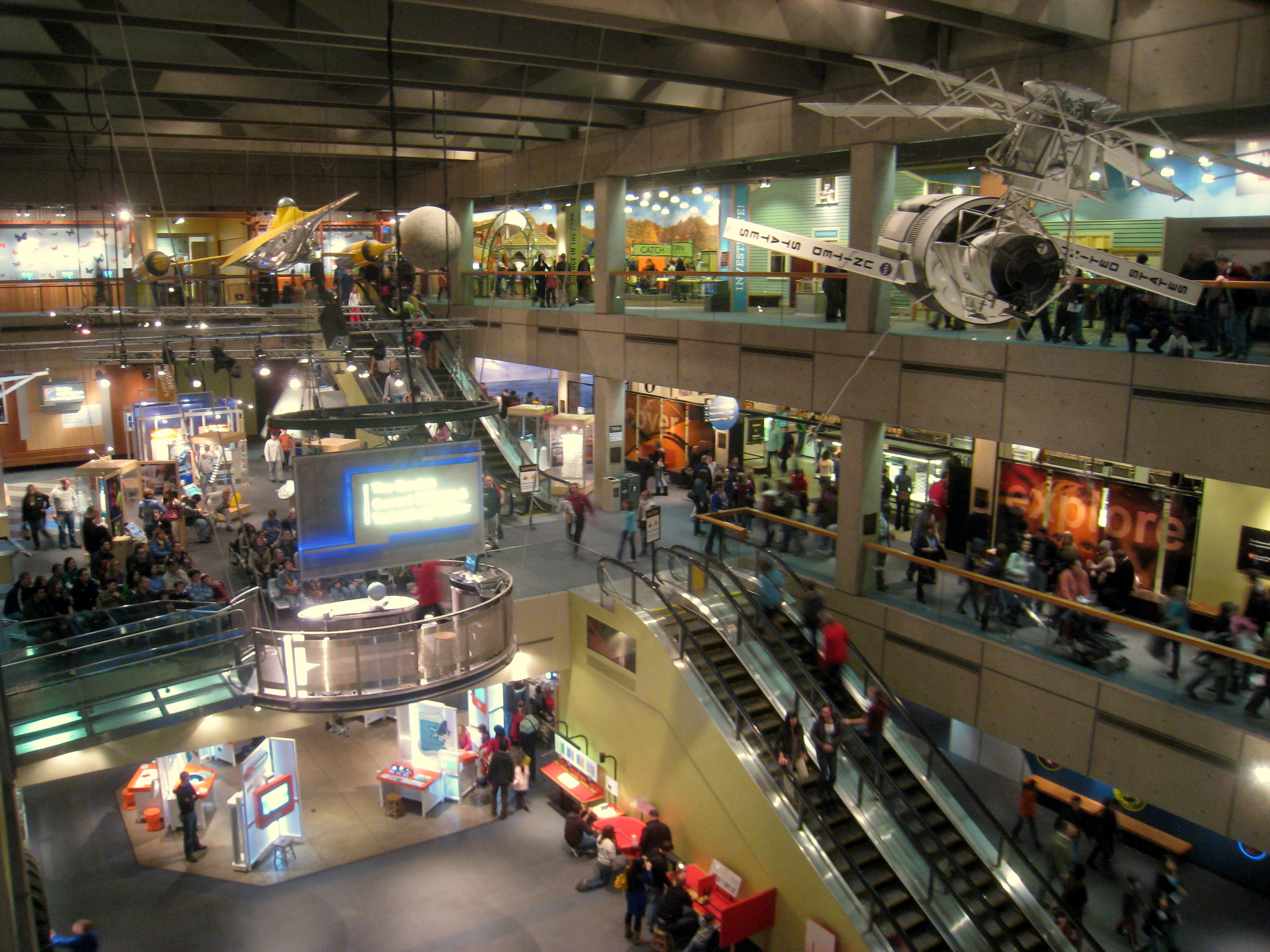
The many exhibits in the Blue Wing

Blue Wing

- Theater of Electricity: features the Round Hill generator, the world's largest air-insulated Van de Graaff generator, designed by Robert J. Van de Graaff. The show includes demonstrations of Tesla coils and other electrical apparatus.
- Seeing is Deceiving: a collection of optical illusions, including many motorized illusions
- Arctic Adventure: Exploring with Technology
- Exploring with AI: Making the Invisible Visible
- Giant Sequoia Tree

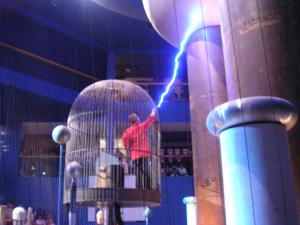
Theater of Electricity demonstration of the world's largest open-air Van de Graaff generator

- Making Models: exhibit on the use of physical and abstract models to understand the real world (closed)
- Mathematica: A World of Numbers... and Beyond: a roomful of classic kinetic and static mathematical exhibits by designers Charles and Ray Eames
- Natural Mysteries: an investigative exhibit on classification of mysterious objects and natural history specimens
- Math Moves!: Experiencing Ratio and Proportion: an immersive exploration of math and proportion
- Clark Collection of Mechanical Movements: over 100 working models of mechanical motions and linkages As of 2024, the Clark Collection is split between an area inside the Theater of Electricity, and the Engineering Design Workshop exhibit.
- Faces of Science: Ambassadors for Equity: How professionals highlighted use their life experiences in their fields.
- Natural Beauty: The Harold Grinspoon Collection: a collection of very large and rare mineralogical crystals and specimens
- Science in the Park: a playground built on Level 2 of the Blue Wing using familiar objects to investigate every day science
- Investigate!: a house-sized collection of rooms to explore using scientific thinking (Closed and replaced by a video immersion room)
- Nanotechnology
- Take a Closer Look
- Dinosaurs: Modeling the Mesozoic: a collection of fossils and life-size models of dinosaurs and extinct animals, including a full-size Tyrannosaurus rex model
- Colossal Fossil: Triceratops Cliff: a 65-million-year-old fossil, discovered in the Dakota Badlands in 2004
- Machines & Transportation
- To the Moon
- Engineering Design Workshop: an area to design, build, and test solutions to problems. As of 2024, this is located on Level 1 of the Blue Wing.
- Behind the Scenes(Closed in 2025
- Additional temporary exhibits: As of early 2024, the temporary exhibits include Innovation: Earth and a Sustainable Farm.

Green Wing

- New England Habitats: life-sized dioramas showcasing some typical New England habitats and animals
- A Bird's World
- Colby Room: a classic explorer's trophy room filled with stuffed animal heads from big-game hunting, preserved as a historical exhibit and also used for meetings
- Hall of Human Life: an exhibit of interactive activities focusing on human biology and the exhibit also has cotton-top tamarins.
- Rotating temporary exhibits: November through January, this typically includes an exhibit on trains titled All Aboard! Trains at Science Park.

Red Wing

- Mugar Omni Theater: largest Omnimax movie theater in New England
- Charles Hayden Planetarium
- Cosmic Light: small space exhibit located within the planetarium waiting area, featuring real images of space and small bronze models of the Solar System's Sun and planets similar to the ones formerly displayed outside scattered throughout Greater Boston
- Foucault pendulum: shows the effect of the rotation of the Earth
- Polage: a wall-sized polarized light collage of shapes by artist Austine Wood Comarow
- Soundstair: a stairway fitted by artist Christopher Janney, using photoelectric cells to trigger musical sounds
- Archimedean Excogitation: a large rolling ball sculpture by George Rhoads
- Museum Store

Miscellaneous

- Yawkey Gallery on the Charles River: an open area at the rear of the entrance hall, filled with information about the Charles River and river science in general
- The Rock Garden: an outdoors area in front of the museum, showcasing boulder-sized mineral specimens with accompanying plaques explaining their provenance and significance
- The five exterior decorative aluminum panels formerly on the facade facing the Charles River Basin were created by Belmont sculptor Theodore Barbarossa. They have been removed for the construction of a new glass-enclosed Public Science Common, and plans for the displaced artworks are unknown.

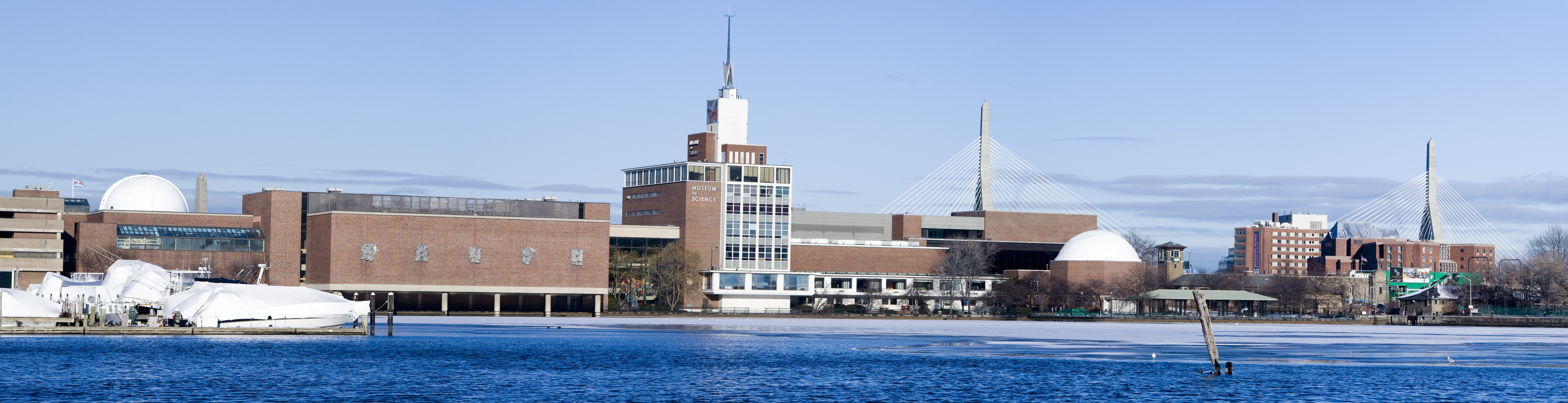
The Museum of Science spans the length of the Charles River Dam, including a dedicated parking garage at far left. The white dome at left houses the Theater of Electricity, while the dome at the right houses the planetarium. The twin towers of the Leonard P. Zakim Bunker Hill Memorial Bridge are visible at the background right.

== Notable past exhibits ==
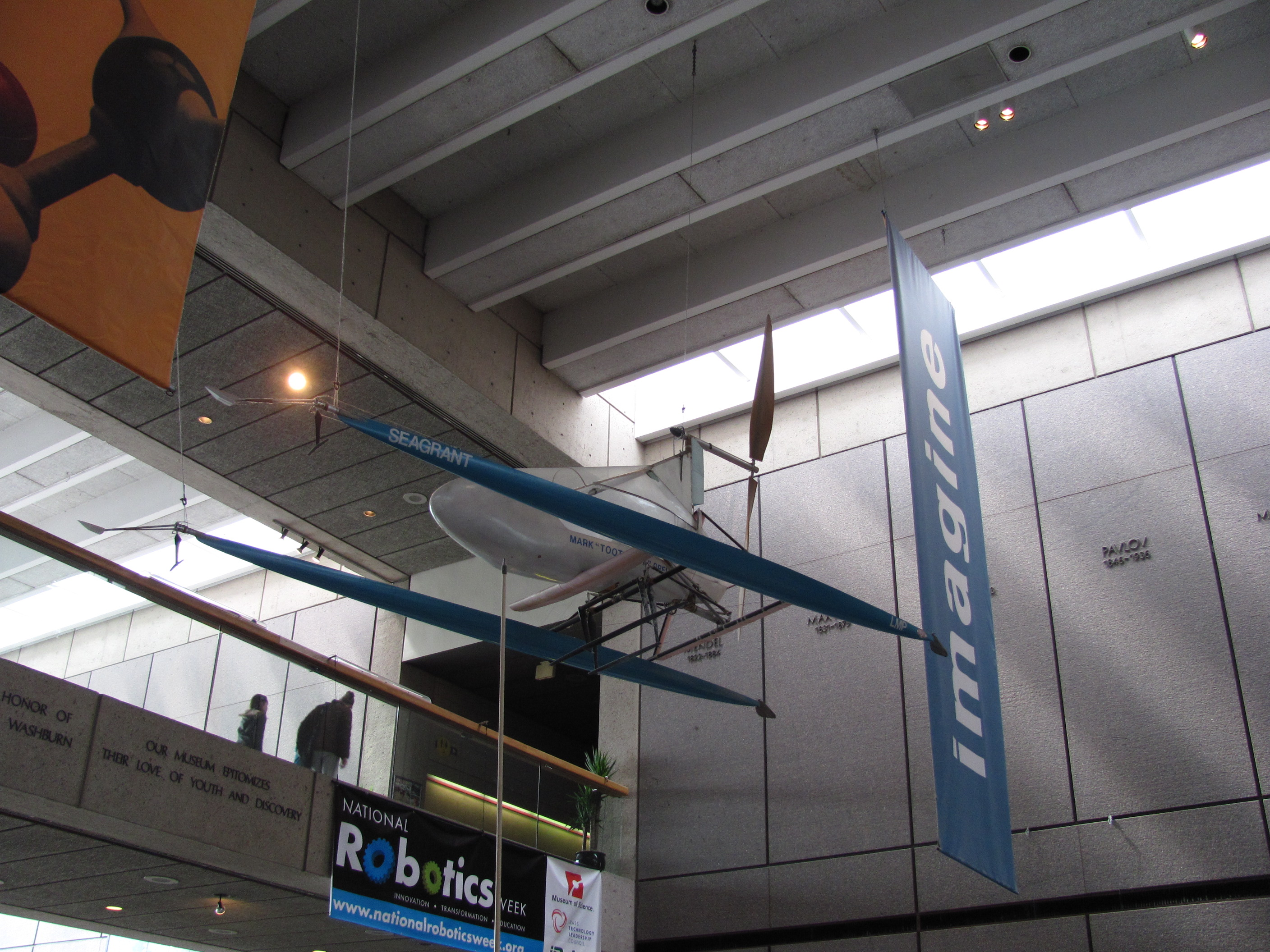
Decavitator human-powered hydrofoil boat was formerly displayed above the main entrance lobby of the museum.

- In the 1950s, a small Wilson cloud chamber was featured in the main entrance hall. Visitors could come within inches of radioactive material to watch the vapor trails of the particles they emitted.
- The first Fresnel lens using electricity in the US (removed from the Navesink lighthouse), was on display from the early 1950s until 1979.
- From 1969 to 1985, the museum borrowed a steam locomotive—Boston and Maine 3713—from Steamtown, U.S.A., and it was exhibited outside the museum's building. The museum ended their lease on the locomotive to allow room for expansion.
- In 1988, the museum was host to an exhibit focusing on the life and times of Ramses II. The exhibit displayed more than 70 artifacts, on loan from the Egyptian Museum in Cairo. Arguably, the centerpiece of the exhibit was a 40-foot-tall model of an Egyptian temple which housed a 3,000-year-old, 57-ton granite statue of Ramses. The exhibit ran from May 7, 1988 through August 30, 1988.
- From August to October 2004, the museum was host to the US premiere of The Lord of the Rings the Motion Picture Trilogy the Exhibition, developed by the Te Papa museum in New Zealand, and containing many of the costumes and props from the films.
- The Museum of Science built and designed its own film-based exhibit, entitled Star Wars: Where Science Meets Imagination. It was on display there from October 2005 to April 2006, and traveled to other venues.
- Gunther von Hagens's Body Worlds 2: The Anatomical Exhibition of Real Human Bodies was at the Museum of Science from July 29, 2006 to January 7, 2007.
- Harry Potter: The Exhibition was at the museum from October 25, 2009 to February 21, 2010.
- The Science Behind Pixar is a 13,000 square feet (1,200 m^{2}) exhibition which toured around the US. Created by the Museum of Science in collaboration with Pixar Animation Studios, this exhibit featured activities, videos, and images that illustrated the math, computer science, and physical science that go into making computer-animated films.
- Discovery Center: offered the opportunity for young visitors to talk with scientists and participate in experiments

== Computing exhibits ==
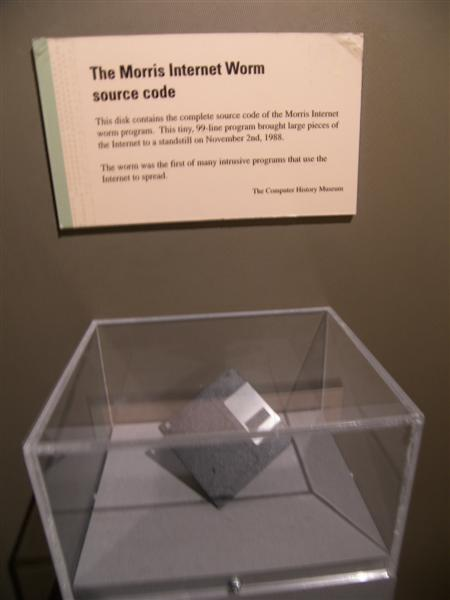
A disk containing the source code for the Morris worm was located in the museum's Computing Revolution exhibit.

Although the history artifacts of The Computer Museum (TCM) were moved from Boston to Silicon Valley to become the core of the current Computer History Museum, some former TCM educational exhibits and objects were transferred to the Boston Museum of Science where two new computing and technology exhibits were created. The Computing Revolution, an exhibit no longer on display at the Museum of Science, related the history of computing through a variety of hands-on interactive exhibits. Cahners ComputerPlace, previously located in the Blue Wing, Level 1, housed displays ranging from educational video games to an interactive AIBO ERS-7 robot. The first integrated quantum computing system, developed by MOS Director of Strategic Projects Carol Lynn Albert in collaboration with IBM, is on display as part of MOS's computing exhibits.

== Other attractions ==
- In 1997, the museum developed a permanent to-scale community Solar System model that physically spanned as far as the Riverside MBTA station (in Newton, Massachusetts). This model was featured in the first episode of the PBS Kids show FETCH! with Ruff Ruffman, where several children participate in a scavenger hunt to find all of the bronze model planets (including the former ninth planet Pluto, as the show premiered before Pluto was downgraded), scattered all throughout Greater Boston. The bronze models of the Sun, Mercury, and Venus were located on the museum grounds. However, in 2015 several of the scale models were removed from their original locations, and their current status is unknown as of 2024. As of 2023, only the model of Mars still remained, inside Cambridgeside Galleria Mall. The nearest known surviving scale model is a walkable 200-metre (660 ft) installation on the third floor of the Infinite Corridor at MIT.
- Construction began on a rooftop Wind Turbine Lab in 2009. The lab tests nine wind turbines from five different manufacturers on the roof of the museum. An exhibit in the Blue Wing, Catching the Wind, included a live data stream on how much electricity each turbine was producing.
