= Jelle's Marble Runs =

YouTube channel based on marble races and marble runs

- Born: Jelle and Dion Bakker; 1983 (age 42–43) and 1981 (age 44–45); Wervershoof, Netherlands
- Occupation: YouTuber

YouTube information
- Channel: Jelle's Marble Runs
- Years active: 2006–present
- Genre: Sports
- Subscribers: 1.45 million
- Views: 204.1 million
- Last updated: February 2026
- Website: jellesmarbleruns.com

Jelle's Marble Runs is a YouTube channel based in the Netherlands centered on marbles, marble runs and marble races. It is run by brothers Jelle and Dion Bakker. The channel spoofs the Olympic Games, Formula One, and other sporting events with marbles and treats the cast of marbles as though they were athletes.

The Marble League (formerly MarbleLympics and previously Marble Olympics) has a choreographed opening and closing ceremony, often created using stop motion and domino runs. Many of the sports are designed to resemble Olympic sports. Each year, the channel uploads a new series of the Marble League featuring different events and teams, which are introduced in the qualifying round. If a team does not qualify, they are sent to the Showdown, essentially a shorter Marble League; any team finishing in the bottom four in the Showdown will be barred from competing in next year's Marble League qualification.

The channel also uploads Marbula One, a marble version of Formula One where many of the same teams from the Marble League send duos to faceoff, if certain marbles or teams do too badly in the season they don't appear in the next season and they get replaced by different marbles or teams. Another series is the Sand Marble Rally, which instead of teams features individual marbles exclusive to the series. As of August 26, 2026, the channel has over 1.51 million subscribers with more than 213 million views.

== Overview ==
Jelle's Marble Runs has built a following personifying marbles throughout a variety of competitions. Each video is produced in the form of a sporting event with commentary provided by American Greg Woods.

The channel features annual series such as the Marble League, the Marble Rally, Marbula One, and the Hubelino Tournament (which went on hiatus from 2018 to 2025). Additionally, Jelle produces seasonal Halloween and Christmas content, as well as one-off events such as the A-Maze-ing Marble Race and the Last Marble Standing. Interspersed between the competition videos, Jelle releases a wide variety of marble runs without commentary exhibiting his marble course constructions (some of which are on display in museums).

== History ==
Jelle Bakker was born in 1983 in Wervershoof, Netherlands. He has stated that he has a form of autism, and said that because he has no occupation, making marble machines was one of his biggest hobbies. He currently lives in Wervershoof, which is also where his videos are produced.

In 2006, Bakker created the first version of the Jelle's Marble Runs YouTube channel. He received the Guinness World Record for the world's longest marble run on 21 May 2009, a record that he held until 2011. Greg Woods, an early fan of the channel, produced a commentary on his own for one of the marble race videos. Bakker liked the video so much that he ended up partnering with Woods, who became the English-language commentator for the entire series. Jelle founded the first marble race event, The Sand Marble Rally, with Greg Woods as commentator in 2016.

The channel soon started gaining attention and a fanbase in 2015, Jelle's brother Dion came up with the idea to make more marble races instead of marble runs and founded the MarbleLympics (now known as the Marble League) in 2016, parodying the Olympic Games. Originally, Bakker planned to end the MarbleLympics series after the 2017 MarbleLympics. However, he continued the series due to popularity.

In late 2018, Bakker accidentally deleted his original channel of 620,000 subscribers while attempting to delete his Google+ account, and was subsequently forced to relaunch. By March 2020, the channel's subscriber number had surpassed this former level.

In 2020 Jelle's brother Dion incorporated Jelle's Marble Runs as a business, with both Jelle's Marble Runs and Dion Media as owners and creators of the YouTube channel. Dion Media started a webshop, and founded a Patreon page. Dion also founded a new concept of Marble Races, Marbula One, which is a mock version of the Formula One. The Fédération Internationale de l'Automobile accepted the name Marbula One, but the International Olympic Committee rejected the name 'Marblelympics', so it was changed into "Marble League". On 17 May 2020, British-American comedian and late-night show host John Oliver announced on his show Last Week Tonight with John Oliver that the show would be the title sponsor for the 2020 Marble League, which brought significant attention to the channel.

In May-June 2025, Jelles Marble Runs Channel Drop LLC successfully raised $53,000 in funds to expand the channel's operations in the home country of the Netherlands. The offering noted that earlier in 2025 the channel had grown to over 1.4 million followers, with $82,000 in 12 month trailing revenue from YouTube (not including merchandising).

== Series ==
=== Recurring ===
==== Marble League ====
The Marble League (known as the MarbleLympics before 2020) is an annual series featuring 16 teams of five (formerly four) marbles competing in multiple Olympics-inspired disciplines, including events of speed, strength, accuracy, endurance, etc., over 16 total events. Points are awarded based on final event placement, and the top three event finishers are awarded medals. The champions of the Marble League are crowned based on the total cumulative points from all events in a single edition.

Top-ranked teams, usually the overall podium finishers, automatically qualify for the next Marble League championship and, starting in 2018, a team is chosen as a host, also granting them an automatic qualification. A pre-tournament qualifying event determines which of the remaining teams are allowed to compete in the championship each year. The teams that fail to qualify participate in the Marble League Showdown, a shorter tournament consisting of about 4-8 events. The bottom four teams from the Showdown are auto-relegated for the next Marble League cycle, which means that they cannot compete in the qualifiers and remain in the Showdown instead. However, this rule has not been upheld consistently, with relegation called off in the 2021, 2023, and 2024 Marble League Showdowns.

Marble League 2020 faced cancellation due to a lack of funding, but a fully paid sponsorship from Last Week Tonight with John Oliver was announced on 17 May 2020 for all 16 events, with 5,000 USD going to food bank charities in the event winners' name, and US$20,000 going to the International Rescue Committee in the overall winners' name, allowing for the 2020 edition to commence as planned.

Marble League 2024 also featured a sponsorship from Mint Mobile, which carried over to the Marble League All-Stars tournament held after the Marble League, and the Marble League Showdown held for non-qualified teams of the Marble League. As a result, despite not qualifying for the 2024 season, the mint-based team Minty Maniacs effectively co-hosted the league, providing demonstration runs, sometimes joined alongside new team Santa's Squad.

As of 2025, the Savage Speeders and Pinkies, the most recent champions, are the most successful teams in the Marble League, with two titles each (Savage Speeders in 2016 and 2020, and Pinkies in 2022 and 2026). The O'rangers, Midnight Wisps, Raspberry Racers, Mellow Yellow, Crazy Cat's Eyes, Team Momo, and the Kobalts have won one each. Currently, 32 teams participate in the Marble League & Showdown. Following poor results, some teams have folded from the Marble League, like the Quicksilvers, the Golden Orbs and the Hornets. Previously retired team the Jawbreakers returned for the Marble League 2026 cycle, replacing the retiring Purple Rockets. In 2022, the Bumblebees recruited two athletes from the Hornets after the latter disbanded following a series of failures for the team, led by a last place finish in Marble League 2020.

==== Marble Rally ====
The Marble Rally (formerly known as the Sand Marble Rally) is a series of off-road marble races, where individual marbles race against each other down a rough terrain course, usually sand, that has been manually constructed. The courses feature a variety of features and obstacles that impede competing marbles on their way to the finish line. Marbles used for the Marble Rally are larger than marbles used for the Marble League, with a diameter of 25 mm compared to the Marble League's 16 mm marbles. Starting from the 2017 edition, top-ranked marbles automatically qualify for the next year's Marble Rally championship.

The most successful Sand Rally marble is Red Number 3, winning three titles in 2018, 2019, and in 2026, on the back of a silver in 2017. Red Number 3 is also the current Marble Rally Champion as of November 2026, winning Season 8. Other successful marbles are Ghost Plasma with a gold, silver, and bronze finish; Superball with a gold and three bronze finishes; Slimer and Dragon's Egg with a gold and two bronze finishes each. In 2018, a Reddit user discovered that Red Number 3 was not actually a glass marble, but a plastic key fob, which likely gave them an advantage in winning their first championship. After their second title, the original Red Number 3 was replaced by an actual glass marble, which in kayfabe was stated as the athlete undergoing surgery to become a full marble. However in Season 8, the glass marble Red Number 3 was accidentally swapped out with the original key fob from 2019. Jelle's Marble Runs admitted to this mistake, and stated that it was done by accident after mistaking the key fob for the glass marble after a separate off-season race. Due to this, Red Number 3 will be required to qualify for Season 9, with his autoqualification spot being taken by Pollo Loco. His championship victory, however, wasn't revoked.

==== Marbula One ====
Marbula One is a series of circuit-based marble races, where marbles race multiple laps around a racetrack made of Quercetti Big Marbledrome tracks with custom paper stock add-ons, as well as a conveyor belt that returns all marbles back to the top. As its name suggests, this series is directly inspired by the Formula One motor racing championship. Each race event in this series is referred to as Grand Prix, hosted by a marble team, and includes a qualifying session to determine who will qualify for the main race event, as well as the starting grid.

The first edition of Marbula One premiered in February 2020, shortly before the COVID-19 pandemic. Sixteen teams from the Marble League were invited to compete in the inaugural edition, which consisted of eight events. The qualifying session for this edition was a simple single-round session, with each marble given one flying lap to complete. The points system for this edition was also adopted directly from Formula One, including a bonus point for setting the fastest lap time during the main race event.

Each subsequent edition of Marbula One has introduced new features, while also making changes to the existing features, with different qualifying formats and championship points systems for each edition. The third edition introduced a redesigned starting grid and conveyor belt to allow for up to 20 marbles to participate in each race. Marbula 1 Season 3 saw the first double time individual champion, with Red Eye of the Crazy Cat's Eyes, and Marbula 1 Season 4 saw a first double time team champion set by the Savage Speeders. In total, the Savage Speeders and the Crazy Cat's Eyes have two team championships each, while the O'rangers and the Hazers have one each. Red Eye is the most successful individual competitor, with three gold and two bronze finishes; Speedy from the Savage Speeders has a gold and a silver, Smoggy from the Hazers a gold and a bronze, and Momo from Team Momo has an individual gold.

==== Marble Survival ====
Marble Survival, formerly known as Marble Survival 100, is a survival competition held between all 32 teams in the Marble League competing to avoid elimination over a series of races. The first edition saw two weekly eliminations over seven races, with the format changing as more races passed and more teams were eliminated. The first edition was won by Sea of the Oceanics. The second edition took place from March to April 2025 with a new format, and was won by Pinky Panther from the Pinkies. Each race in the second edition had one elimination. In February 2026, a similar team event branded as Iron Marble was won by the Indigo Stars.

==== Hubelino Tournament ====
The Hubelino Tournament is a tournament series contested on courses constructed with Hubelino marble tracks and using 20mm marbles. The tournament consists of multiple events run on Hubelino marble tracks, including funnel endurance, which was eventually added to the Marble League. This series was discontinued after the 2018 edition, but resumed in 2025.

=== One-off ===
==== Marble League Winter Special ====
The Marble League Winter Special was an invitational tournament held in the beginning of 2021, where 16 teams competed in 5 winter-themed events, like the 2018 Marble League which was also winter-themed. The competition was won by the Oceanics.

==== Marbula E ====
Marbula E was a circuit-based marble racing series directly based on the Formula E racing championship. Created as a spin-off of Marbula One, this series was sponsored by Envision Virgin Racing. It featured marble teams named after real Formula E teams that competed in the 2019–20 Formula E Championship (unlike other series, which feature fictional teams) and racetracks closely based on real-life ePrix. The first episode premiered on 18 April 2020, consisting of a race in a recreation of the Paris Street Circuit, and was narrated by British professional Formula E commentator Jack Nicholls. JMR commentator Greg Woods later joined Nicholls from the second race in a circuit based on the Seoul ePrix.

Mercedes-Benz EQ dominated the first half of the season with three consecutive podium finishes. In the second half, TAG Heuer Porsche snatched first in the standings with two consecutive race wins, and managed to hold their lead in the standings at the final race in a circuit based on the London ePrix. Mercedes-Benz EQ finished second overall, while DS Techeetah finished third overall.

==== Last Marble Standing ====
To celebrate the channel's 1,111,111 subscribers milestone, Last Marble Standing was announced on 21 May 2020. This tournament, sponsored by Arla Foods UK's Cravendale, featured six new dairy-themed teams, and included six events. The tournament was won by Graze of Glory, who had dominated the entire tournament by staying in first in the standings for all but one event, winning three gold medals and one silver medal in the process.

==== Freak Marbles ====
Freak Marbles was a sponsored series by Jelle's Marble Runs. It featured 24 30mm Marbles racing on a sand track. The format was 4 groups of 6 marbles, and the top 2 of each group would advance to the grand finale. Jelly Eye turned out to be the Freak Marble champion after 5 videos.

==== Marble ManiaX ====
Marble ManiaX was a series of extreme sports marble competition, featuring a number of structures built from various materials, including K'Nex. This series was sponsored by record label Spinning Records. And a total of eight teams participated in this tournament series, including three classic Marble League teams. The Purple Rockets ended up winning with 2 points more than the Constrictors, and were invited to compete in the Marble League Showdown that same year, joining the league in a 4-team expansion.

==== Marble League All-Stars ====
The Marble League All-Stars was a competition held between 16 of the most successful or iconic teams in the history of the league, held in the aftermath of the 2024 Marble League. The competition was won by reigning Marble League Champions Team Momo, with the Savage Speeders finishing 2nd place and the Minty Maniacs finishing 3rd place, while the Balls of Chaos finished dead last.
