= Bruce Gray (sculptor) =

American sculptor (born 1956)

Bruce Gray (born November 14, 1956 Orange, New Jersey, died June 8, 2019 Los Angeles, California) was an artist residing in Los Angeles. His work includes kinetic art such as rolling ball machines, mobiles, stabiles, and suspended magnetic sculptures. He also creates found objects sculptures such as a lifesize motorcycle sculpture constructed from train parts, and giant objects such as a large aluminum wedge of Swiss cheese and giant high heel shoes. Gray's work has been displayed at many museums, art galleries, and is part of over 1200 corporate and private art collections. His work has appeared in numerous films and television shows including Charmed, Austin Powers, Meet the Fockers, Batman Forever, Sleeping with the Enemy, Six Feet Under, Seinfeld, Star Trek, Friends, Frasier, Roseanne, Murphy Brown, How I Met Your Mother, and NYPD Blue.

Bruce Gray's sculptures can be seen at Little Rock National Airport, Edwards Air Force Base, Vanderbilt University, University of Pittsburgh Medical Center, Children's Hospital Boston, Kapor Enterprises, The Academy of Motion Picture Arts and Sciences, Lucile Packard Children's Hospital, Network Solutions, A&M Records, NBCUniversal, Doubletree, Embassy Suites Hotels, Southern California Edison, Kaiser Permanente, Clean Harbors, and the Rolling Ball Museum permanent collection in Seoul, South Korea.

== Education ==
Bruce Gray attended Bridgewater Raynham Regional High School in Massachusetts and graduated in 1975. He attended United States Coast Guard Electronics Technician and LORAN A School on Governors Island, New York and graduated in 1976. He attended the University of Massachusetts Dartmouth from 1979 to 1983 and received a BFA in Design.
