= Congreve clock =

Clock that uses a rolling ball to measure time

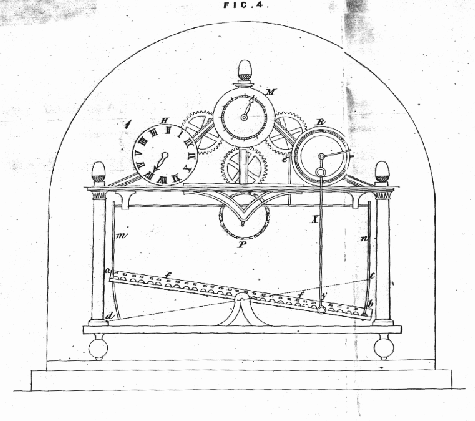
Congreve's Rolling Ball Clock as it appeared in his patent application of 1808

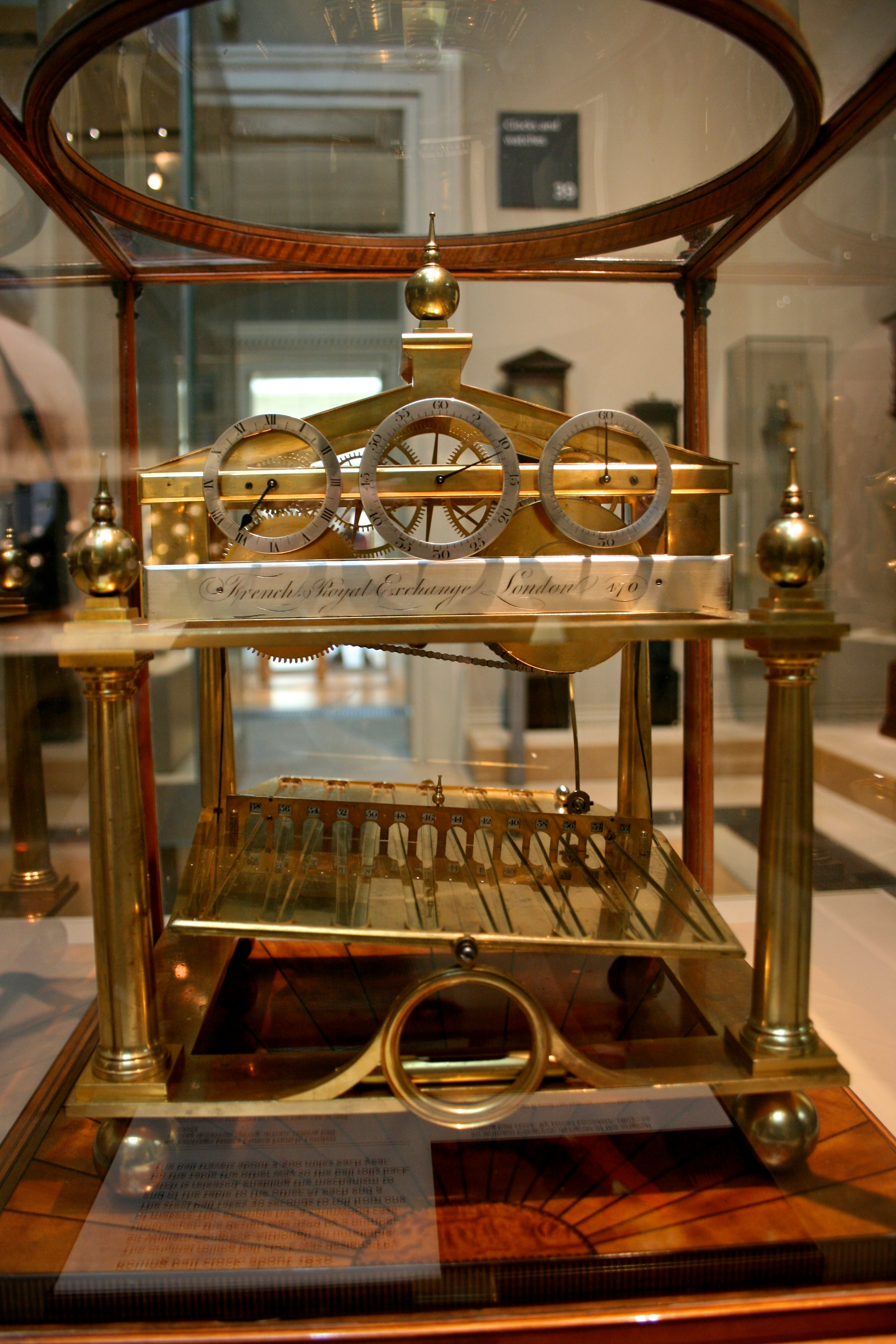
A rolling ball clock from 1820 in the British Museum.

A Congreve clock (also known as Congreve's Rolling Ball Clock or Oscillating Path Rolling Ball Clock) is a type of clock that uses a ball rolling along a zigzag track to regulate the time. It was invented by Sir William Congreve in 1808. The ball takes between 15 seconds and one minute to run down the zigzag track, where it trips the escapement which in turn reverses the tilt of the tray and at the same time causes the hands of the clock to move forward. Thus the angle of the plate reverses and the clock hands move forward between one and four times every minute. On versions of the clock with a dial to indicate seconds, the second hand jumps forward either 15 or 30 seconds on each oscillation depending on the length of the track.

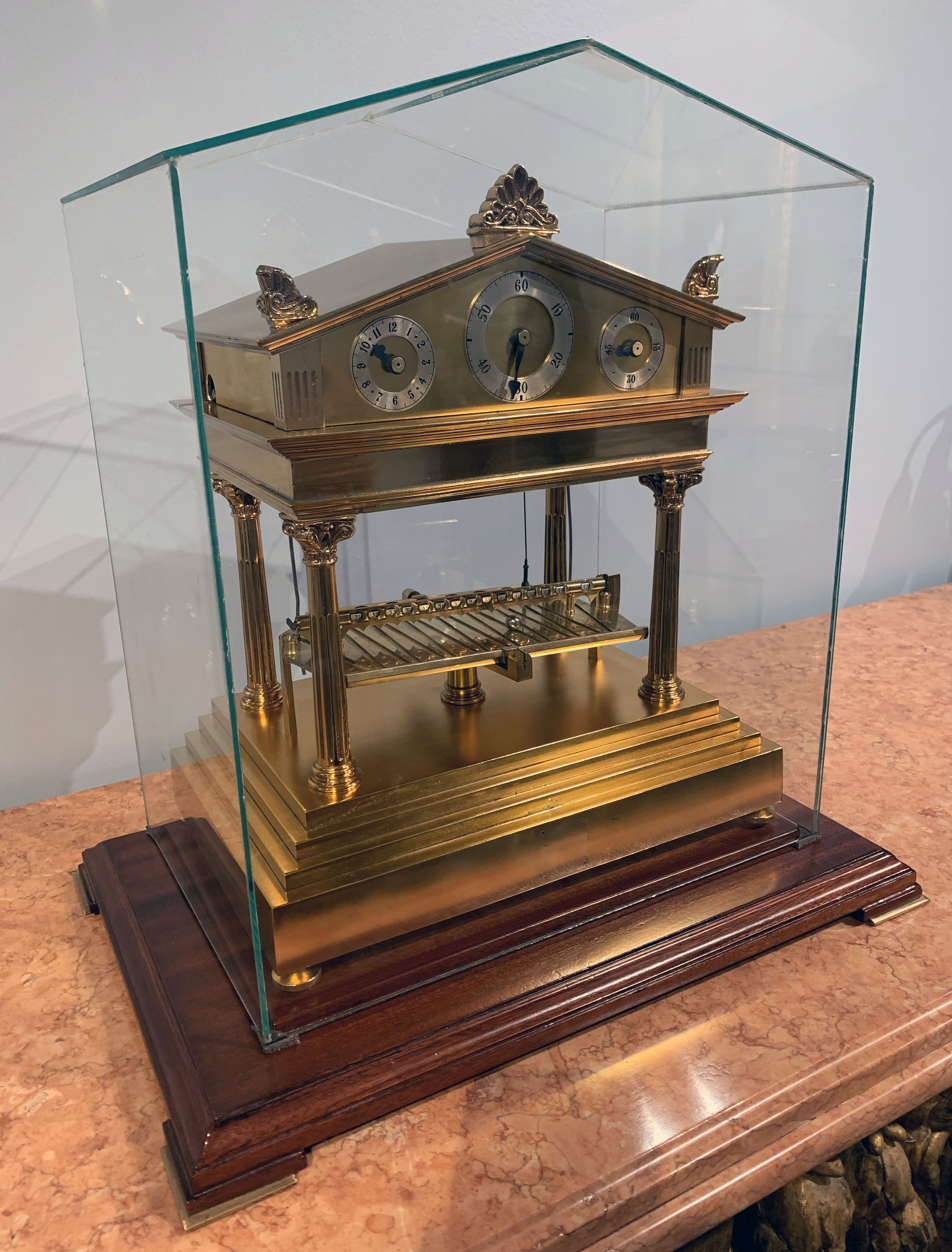
Congreve Rolling Ball Clock

Congreve appears to have been unaware that rolling ball clocks had been invented earlier by both Nicolas Grollier de Servière and Johann Sayller. Congreve's version differed from Grollier's rolling ball clock in that the ball travelled down a zigzag rather than straight path. While Sayller's version had also used a zigzag path, it had utilized a number of balls and a fixed table rather than the single ball and tilting table employed by Congreve. The "Extreme Detached Escapement" (as Congreve referred to his escapement design) was patented in 1808. Congreve, who was not a clock maker, hired Gravell & Tolkien to produce the first working version, which he then presented to the Prince of Wales in 1808. This version was weight-driven, but the second design, which appears to have been constructed by John Moxon, was spring-driven. The second model is in the collection of Buckingham Palace.

Congreve clocks are unreliable timekeepers — the time taken for the ball to travel along the track varies greatly depending on the cleanliness of the track and ball, and since the plate is aligned horizontally, it is easy for dust to accumulate.

== See also ==
- Rolling ball clock
