= Carol Lynn Alpert =

American physics educator

- Education: Harvard College
- Occupation: Director of Strategic Projects at the Museum of Science, Boston
- Honours: Fellow of the American Association for the Advancement of Science

Carol Lynn Alpert is an American science communication and public engagement expert and the Director of Strategic Projects at the Museum of Science in Boston. She is also an Associate in Applied Physics in the John A. Paulson School of Engineering and Applied Sciences at Harvard University and Co-Director of the NSF Center for Integrated Quantum Materials.

== Education ==
She graduated magna cum laude in history and science from Harvard College in 1980.

== Career ==
After graduating, Alpert worked at PBS as a researcher and producer on documentary series covering historical and scientific topics. She then joined the Museum of Science in 1999, where she began to explore the use of YouTube as a means to introduce science concepts to a broad audience. Alpert still creates short films relating to her work at the Museum of Science. Her work on developing the Current Science & Technology Center is covered in the 2004 book Creating Connections: Museums and the Public Understanding of Current Research.

Alpert is the Principal Investigator for the QSTORM-AO Communications Team, a multidisciplinary project initiated in 2010 at Ohio State University to research how quantum dots can be used to image biological tissues at high resolution. She also works in outreach for the Center for High-rate Nanomanufacturing and the Nanoscale Science and Engineering Center.

In 2019, she worked with IBM and exhibit developers to create the first museum exhibit on quantum computing in the U.S., "A Look Inside a Quantum Computer." It featured a model of the dilution refrigerator of an IBM System One. Prior to this, she led a panel on communicating quantum technology at the 2018 Ecsite Conference.

Alpert has published a number of articles on the topic of science communication, education and outreach. In particular, her work focuses on building collaborations between researchers to accelerate advancement, and partnerships between research institutes and science museums. She lectures at MIT on how to communicate research.

== Awards and honors ==
In October 2018 she was elected a Fellow of the American Association for the Advancement of Science in the section on General Interest in Science and Engineering.

Her museum work has received recognition from the American Alliance of Museums.
