= Marble racing =

Racing game involving marbles

- An outdoor marble run which may also be used as a marble racing track
- Genres: Racing game
- Players: Any
- Setup time: Varies
- Playing time: Varies
- Chance: Medium (winning)
- Age range: Any
- Skills: None (Note: Due to the game being a Hands-off game)

Marble racing (Note: Also known as a Marble race) is a hands-off game (Note: or No touching game) involving marbles. Colourful marbles are classed as athletes and are put onto ramps or race tracks but the ramps or race tracks are tilted to an angle where gravity will then pull the marbles down which then the marbles will roll down through obstacles and gravity mazes to the end. The person chooses which marble will win which is tracked from the marbles colour. Marble racing tracks are ether molded from hydrophobic sand, dirt, sand, or toy kits. Marble tracks are ether made from wood, plastic, or other materials like soil and sand.

Although similar marble racing games has been around since 3000 BCE, Marble racing gained more popularity in the 19th, 20th and 21st centuries which has since became a competitive phenomenon. The game was formally a quirky internet oddity to being a popular sports game prior to 2020.

== Gameplay ==
Colourful marbles are placed at the starting line of the race track which the marbles maybe called athletes. There is a barrier preventing the marbles from rolling away. The barrier will be removed and the marbles will roll down the race track due to gravity. The race tracks may have split paves, zig zags, and funnel points which the marbles navigate through. Hazards like obstacles, cones, or paddles can make the marbles slow down. Eventually, every marble racing will make it to the finish line.

Toy kits may be used for marble racing, or carving out sand and dirt out of the ground, or using kinetic sand by molding the sand into a racing track. Materials like wood, plastic, and other materials are used. Typically, race tracks are tilted on an angle of 30 to 45 degrees to allow the marbles to roll quickly.

== History ==
Similar marble racing games have been around since 3000 BCE, but as a typical simple game without involving any obstacles or race tracks since race tracks wasn't a thing yet.

The game gained popuarity in the 19th century in the Victorian Britain ages in the 1850s. In the 1980s, toy kits were made which has marble tracks and gravity mazes which these were advertised on television towards children. The game gained globally popularity and traction online from the YouTube channel Jelle's Marble Runs in the 2000s and 2010s as a simulated motorsport and made-up teams and motorsport championships like Formula One as Marbula One. Jelle uploaded videos of marbles rolling down race tracks just like in the Olympic Games calling his series the MarbleLympics, and other series like the Marble League.

Since 2020, the game has become a competitive phenomenon with organized leagues, official teams, and a massive global fanbase.

== Reception ==
Although marble racing had a steady following before 2020, its global reception gained even more popularity when the COVID-19 pandemic happened in 2020, which started off as a typical quirky internet oddity from the 2000s to being a heavily, highly respected racing game since 2020. Marble racing gained more global popularity from Sports fans due to the COVID-19 pandemic due to people being locked in their houses due to the COVID-19 virus.

The Guardian and Sports Illustrated praised the sport as a soothing, anxiety-reducing escape from a stressful reality.

The game had become a sports game prior to the COVID-19 pandemic.

Due to the popularity and traction of the game in 2020, the game made it to television such as ESPN which they officially picked up the game onto television which was viewed by millions of television viewers.

John Oliver famously championed the sport on HBO's Last Week Tonight, leading to the show officially sponsoring the 2020 Marble League and donating $100,000 to food banks in the process.

The game has since grown a massive fanbase prior to the popularity of the game in 2020 which has sincerely been called a sport.

== See also ==
- Marble (toy)
- Rolling ball sculpture
