= The Lord of the Rings Motion Picture Trilogy: The Exhibition =

Traveling exhibit

Brochure from the Mos Boston exhibition

The Lord of the Rings Motion Picture Trilogy: The Exhibition was a travelling exhibit, created for the Te Papa Tongarewa museum of New Zealand by the Wellington exhibition design company Story Inc, featuring actual props and costumes used in Peter Jackson's The Lord of the Rings films, as well as special effects demonstrations and "making of" documentary videos. The exhibit developed and changed slightly as it moved from one museum to another.

== Props and costumes ==
While the Exhibit could not possibly hope to contain more than a modest sample of the many props and costumes used in the making of the films, many of the major elements were represented, as well as most of the major characters. The One Ring was displayed in its own small room, dark and with its engraving projected onto the walls. Quotes from the film echoed through the chamber: "Cast it into the fire! Destroy it!", "Ash nazg durbatuluk". Many intricate costumes were on display, including various suits of armour of Gondor, Rohan, the Elves, Rangers, Orcs, Uruk-hai, and Nazgûl, as well as the costumes, robes, weapons and suits of armour of Gandalf the Grey, Saruman, Frodo Baggins, Gimli, Legolas, Aragorn, Arwen, Galadriel, and Théoden. Most of the Rings of Power were displayed, the only exception being the Seven Rings of the Dwarf-lords, which were barely seen in the books or the films.

== Special effects ==
The travelling exhibit had one 'permanent' interactive special effects demonstration. A cart, like the one Gandalf rides into Hobbiton on at the beginning of The Fellowship of the Ring, is set up using the principle of split screen. Visitors who sat on one of two cart sets could see themselves in video monitors shrunk down to Hobbit-size, or enlarged to Gandalf-size. Even though the two halves of the cart were different sizes (or, as in the movies, a different distance from the camera), viewers' eyes were tricked, with a little help from a digital split screen, into thinking that the two halves of the cart were in fact one cart, and the people on it differed vastly in size.

At the Museum of Science, Boston, two more interactive demonstrations were added to the Exhibit. A laser scanner, exactly like the one used by Weta Workshop, was used to scan the contours of each visitor's face, creating a digital model in the computer, which was then shaded and textured to look like one of the Argonath, the Statues of the Kings. These hand-held laser scanners were used to scan in all the main actors, as well as a large number & variety of models and maquettes to create digital creatures and characters for the movies. This allowed everything from Shelob to the cave troll to have more realistic size, proportions, and shapes. For some scenes, such as the crossing of the Bridge of Khazad-dûm as it collapses, the entire cast was replaced for a few seconds by digital doubles; the laser scanning technology helped make these doubles look like the real characters.

Also, a motion capture demonstration was created by the HIT Lab NZ, in which visitors wielding coloured foam weapons could move against a green screen and watch an Orc, Elf, or Gondorian Soldier move the same way they did. In the making of the films, especially for the motion capture process that yielded Gollum, a special suit had to be worn, covered in sensors. This allowed for a much more accurate and precise motion capture result than the suit-less camera-based demonstration in the Exhibit, but the basic idea was the same.

== Tour schedule ==
- Te Papa, Wellington, New Zealand: December 19, 2002 - March 30, 2003
- Science Museum, London, England: September 16, 2003 - January 11, 2004
  - The IMAX theater at the Science Museum (London) showed The Fellowship of the Ring and The Two Towers while the Exhibit was with them.
- Singapore Science Centre, Singapore: March 13 - June 4, 2004
- Museum of Science, Boston, Massachusetts, USA: August 1 - October 24, 2004
  - The Museum of Science, Boston held a book signing with Sean Astin, who played Samwise Gamgee, a lecture event with Annie Collins, assistant editor of The Return of the King, and a signing with Lawrence Makoare as well, who played Gothmog, Lurtz, and the Witch-king of Angmar.
- Powerhouse Museum, Sydney, Australia: December 26, 2004 - March 31, 2005
- Houston Museum of Natural Science, Houston, Texas, USA: June 5 - August 28, 2005
- Indiana State Museum, Indianapolis, Indiana, USA: October 8, 2005 - January 3, 2006
- Filmpark Babelsberg, Berlin, Germany: February 1, 2007 – April 29, 2007
- Fundación Caixa Galicia, A Coruña and Santiago De Compostela, A Coruña, Spain: June 23, 2007 - September 16, 2007

== See also ==
- J. R. R. Tolkien
