= The Clark Collection of Mechanical Movements =

Mechanical exhibit at the Museum of Science in Boston

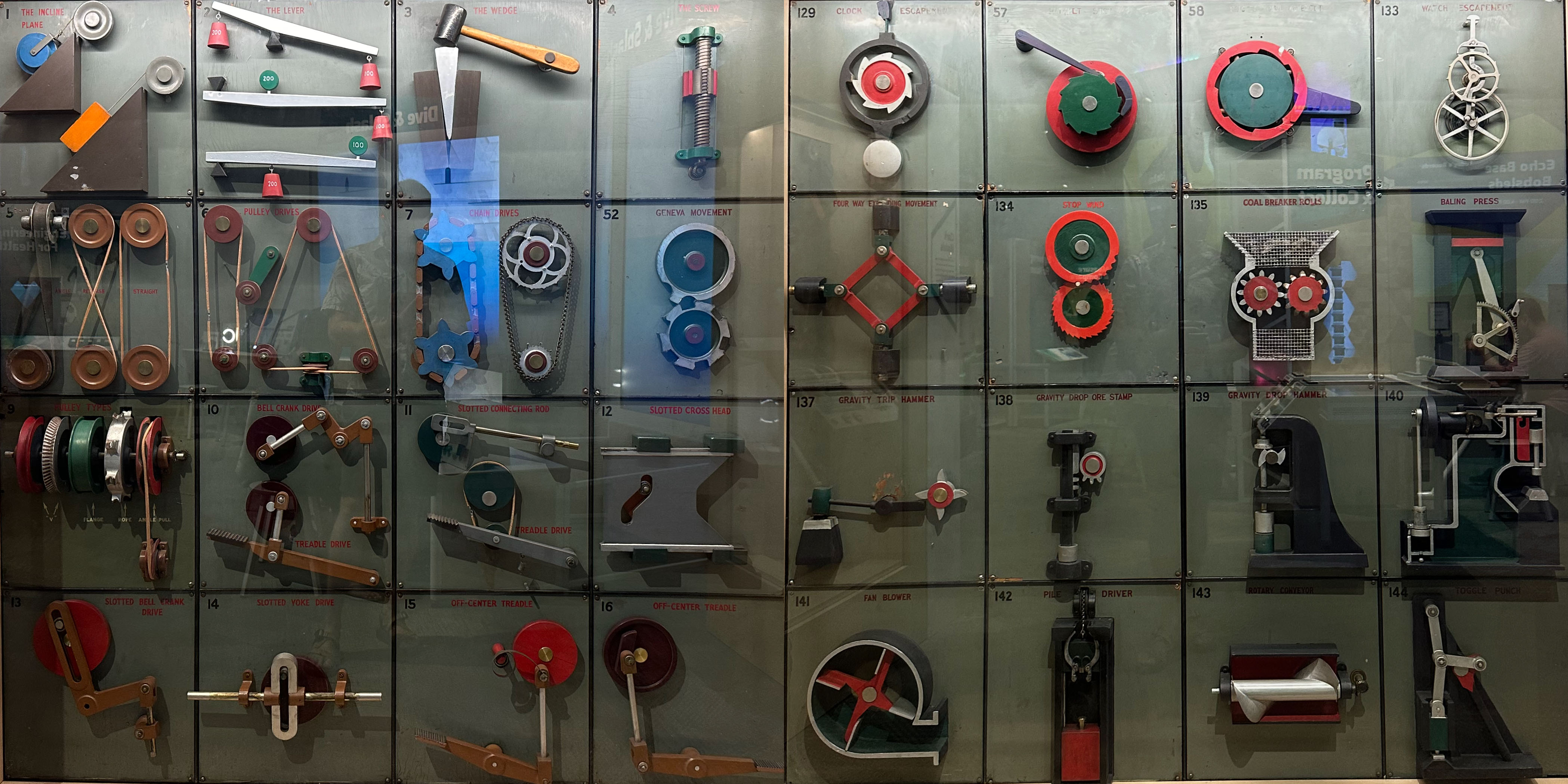
Exhibits 1-16 and 129-144 of Clark Collection of mechanical movements at Museum of Science, Boston

The Clark Collection of Mechanical Movements is a museum exhibit at the Museum of Science (Boston). Built in the 1920s, it currently shows 120 panels of mechanisms, including gears and models of machines. The exhibit is constructed in cabinets of 16 square panels, each measuring 15¼ by 15¼ inches, containing one or more movements.

== History ==
W.M. Clark, of South Orange, New Jersey, in a book accompanying the exhibit described himself as a

"hobbyist ... [who] ... through the help of the book '507 Mechanical Movements', acquired the foundation for a mechanical education, without schooling in the regular way."

The exhibit, originally titled Mechanical Wonderland, was made over "20 years" by Mr. Clark in the early 1900s and displayed in "the Boys' Department of a New York department store".

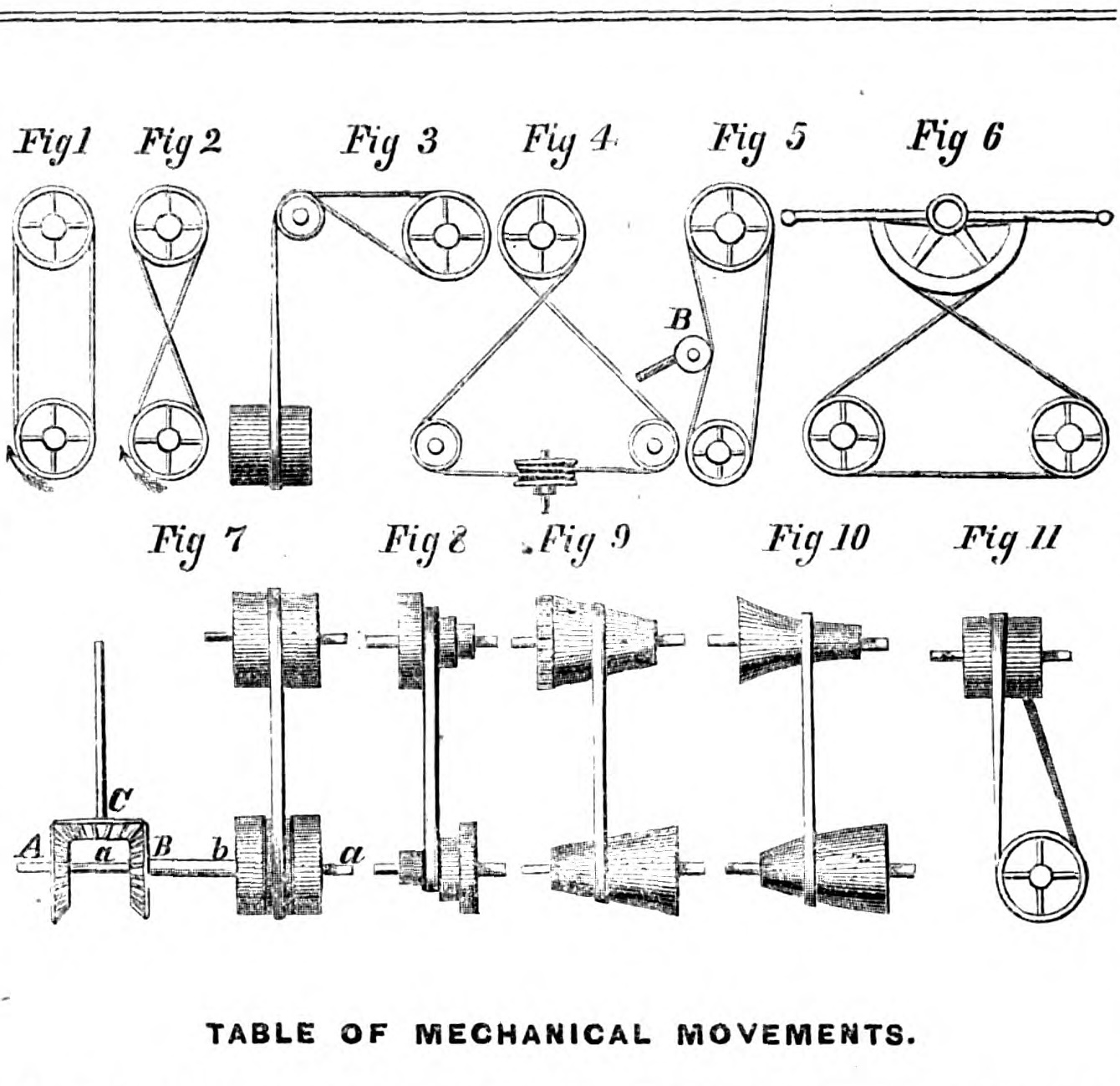
Detail of The American Artisan ser.2-v.1 1865 pg24 : A weekly journal of arts, mechanics, manufactures, engineering, chemistry, inventions, and patents

It was inspired by the book Five Hundred and Seven Mechanical Movements by Henry T. Brown, published in 1869.

- In the 1920s, over 135,000 people saw it in the Grand Central Palace in New York City in a one-week period.
- In 1928, the Mechanical Wonderland exhibit was displayed at the Museum of Peaceful Arts.
- In 1936, the exhibit was displayed in the New York Museum of Science and Industry.
- The exhibit was transferred to the Museum of Science, Boston before 1954.

=== Newark Museum copy of collection ===
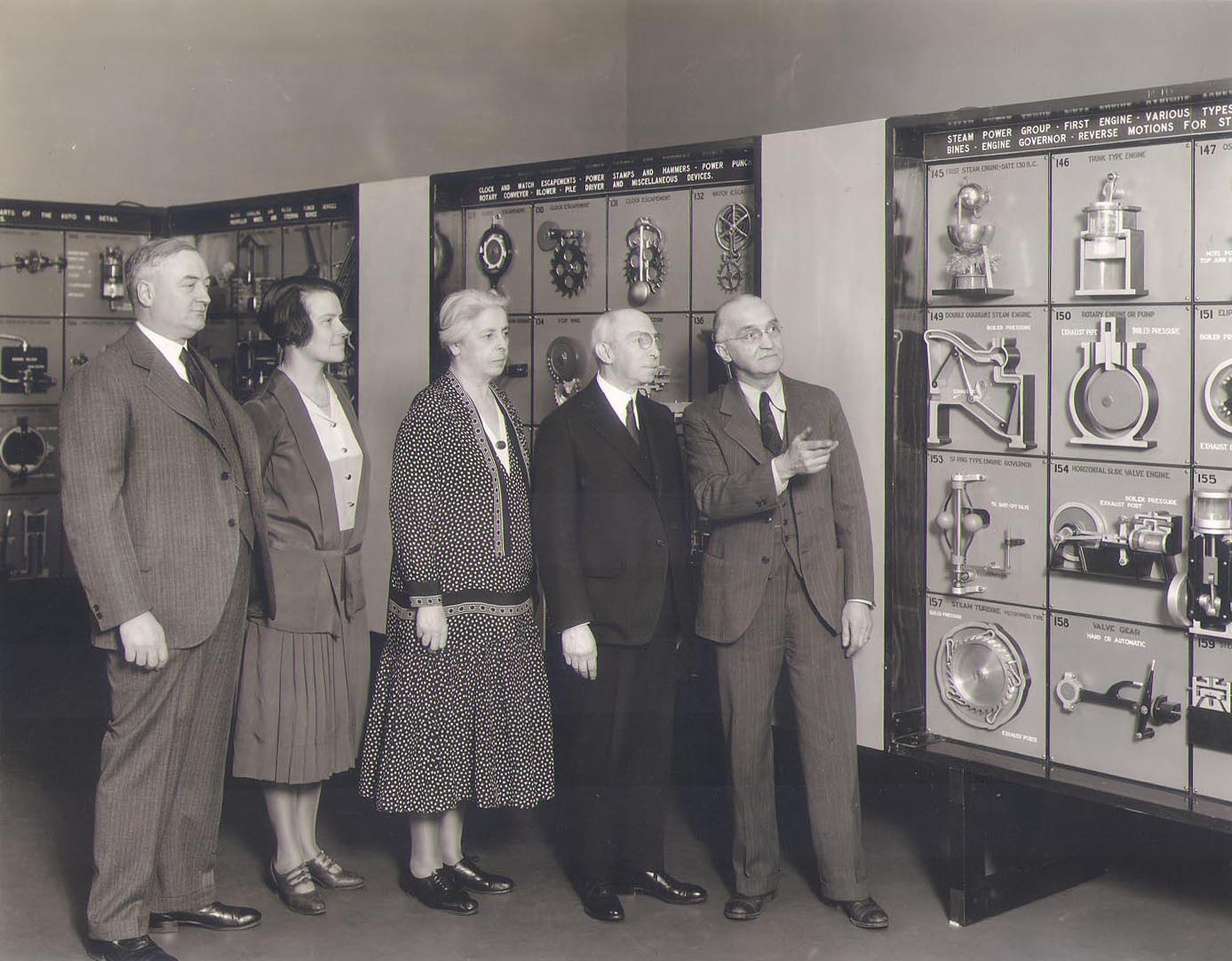
Newark Museum Exhibit of Mechanical Models, 1933

- In 1930, after John Cotton Dana, the founder of the Newark Museum, expressed interest, a second copy of the exhibit was constructed by W.M. Clark and donated to the Newark Museum by Louis Bamberger. The book Mechanical Models was published by the Newark Museum.

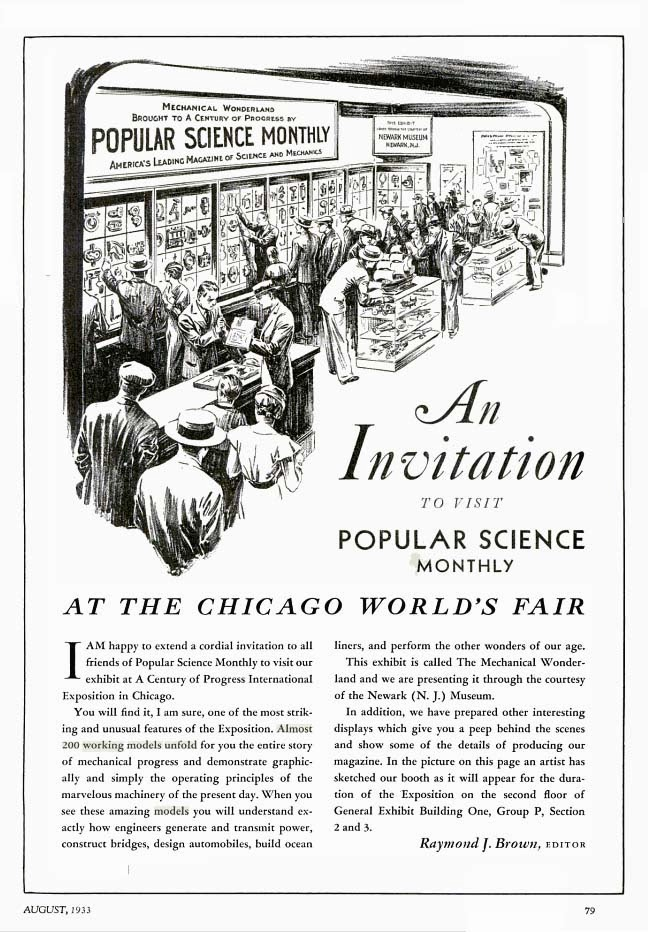
Advertisement for Mechanical Wonderland exhibit at the 1934 Chicago World's Fair, in Popular Science Aug 1933 pg 79.

- In 1933, W.M. Clark published A Manual of Mechanical Movements, to accompany the Chicago World's Fair.
- In 1934, Newark Museum collection was loaned to the Chicago World's Fair, "A Century of Progress".
- In 1943, W.M. Clark published a new edition of A Manual of Mechanical Movements.
- In 1954, The Newark Museum published a review of the exhibit by Kenneth L Gosner.
