= George Rhoads =

American painter and sculptor (1926–2021)

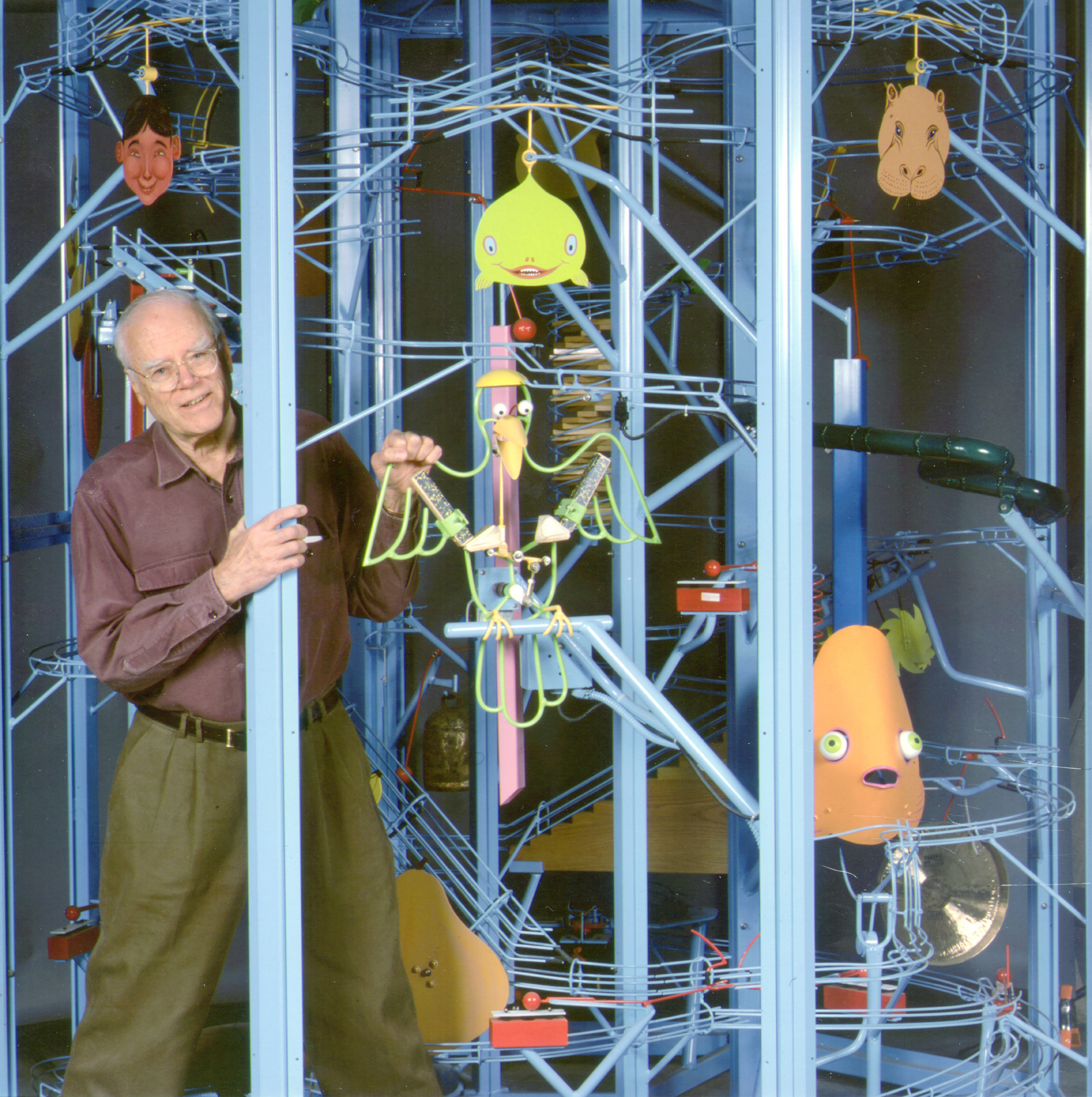
- George Rhoads with his ball machine, "Peaceaball Kingdom"
- Born: George Pitney Rhoads; January 27, 1926; Evanston, Illinois, United States
- Died: July 9, 2021 (aged 95); Chinon, France
- Education: University of Chicago, Chicago Art Institute
- Known for: Audiokinetic sculptures, ball machines, origami, painting, wind sculpture
- Notable work: 42nd Street Ballroom, Port Authority Bus Terminal, New York; Newton's Daydream, Clark Planetarium, Salt Lake City, Utah; Tower of Sisyphus, Chesapeake Energy Corporation, Oklahoma City, Oklahoma; Having a Ball, Ontario Science Center, Toronto, Ontario; University Hospitals, Cleveland, Ohio
- Movement: Kinetic art
- Website: georgerhoads.com

George Rhoads (January 27, 1926 – July 9, 2021) was a contemporary American painter, sculptor and origami master. He was best known for his whimsical audiokinetic sculptures in airports, science museums, shopping malls, children's hospitals, and other public places throughout the world.

== Early life ==
Rhoads was born in Evanston, Illinois, the oldest of four children. His father, Paul S. Rhoads, was a physician and professor of internal medicine at Northwestern University. His mother, Hester Chapin Rhoads, was trained as an interior decorator.

Rhoads attended the University of Chicago with the goal of studying physics and mathematics. After earning enough credits to complete his associate degree, he began taking design and drawing classes at the Art Institute in Chicago. Two years, later he left Chicago and moved to New York City to become a painter. His work focused on portraits and impressionistic cityscapes, but he was not critically or financially successful.

In 1952, Rhoads moved to Paris to continue painting. It was there that he met the American origami expert Gershon Legman who introduced him to the art of origami and the work of Akira Yoshizawa. This meeting sparked Rhoads' interest and he began practicing origami and inventing new folds. His most notable contribution to the field became known as the Blintzed Bird Base, now a standard origami fold used for creating an animal with four legs, two ears and a tail from a single sheet of paper.

== Audiokinetic ball machine sculptures ==
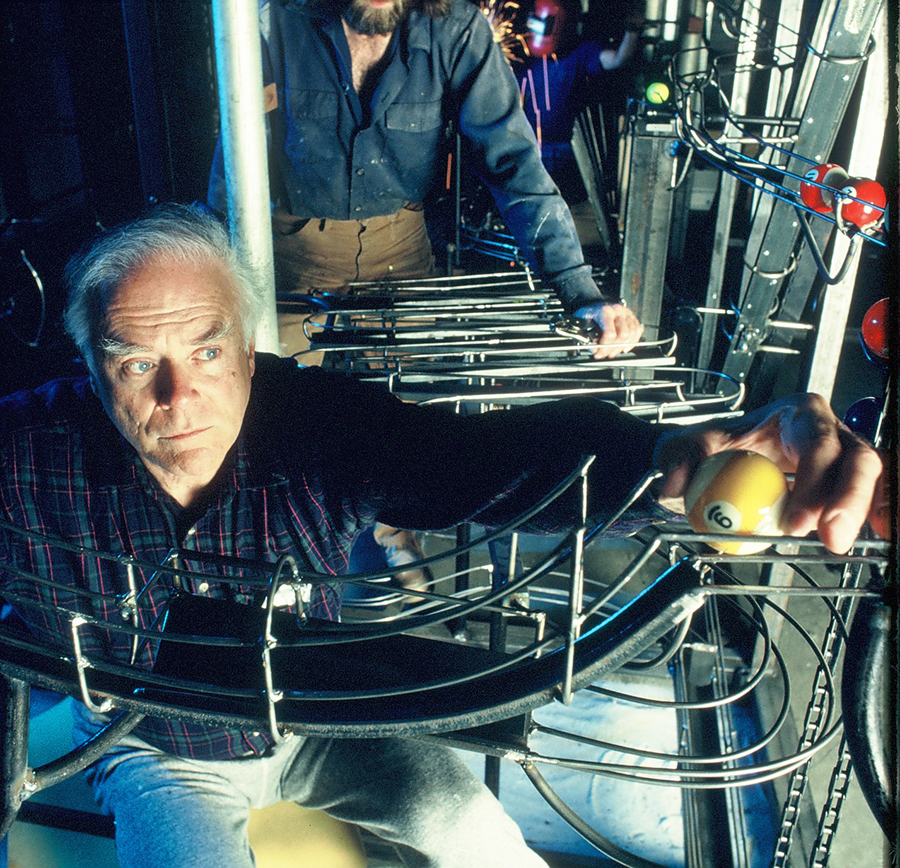
George Rhoads building a rolling ball sculpture

Rhoads created his first rolling ball machine in the late 1950s.

In the 1960s, Rhoads began experimenting with kinetic sound-producing metal sculptures. As he described these early machines, "You have a whole range of things happening in succession. Little balls rolling down a track are the motive power that hits a hammer that hits a xylophone bar or blows a whistle." After seeing an exhibit of Rhoads' ball machines in Greenwich Village, the sculptor Hans Van de Bovenkamp hired him to invent devices to use in his metal fountains. Eventually, Rhoads began creating fountains of his own.

Rhoads continued to develop his audio-kinetic sculptures and his work gained national prominence after being shown on The David Frost Show and Today. In the early 1970s, the shopping mall magnate David Bermant commissioned him to build audiokinetic sculptures for his shopping centers in Rochester, New York, and Hamden, Connecticut, and for years afterward continued to promote and sell Rhoads' work.

Rhoads' sculptures became known for their precise clockwork-like mechanisms governed by weight and timing while still maintaining the appearance of spontaneity and randomness. He promoted the concept that the machine itself was a work of art, and his pieces were designed to demystify machinery and stimulate viewer reaction. Modernist sculptor and Professor Emeritus at Princeton University, James Seawright, said of Rhoads' sculptures: "they embody almost every basic element of machinery, combined in a bewildering variety of ways. There's a level of mechanical genius behind inventing complex mechanisms."

In response to the growing number of commissions, Rhoads partnered Robert McGuire to create his sculptures at RockStream Studios in Ithaca, New York. The studio and Rhoads' whimsical sculptures were later featured in an episode of the American children's television series, Mister Rogers' Neighborhood.

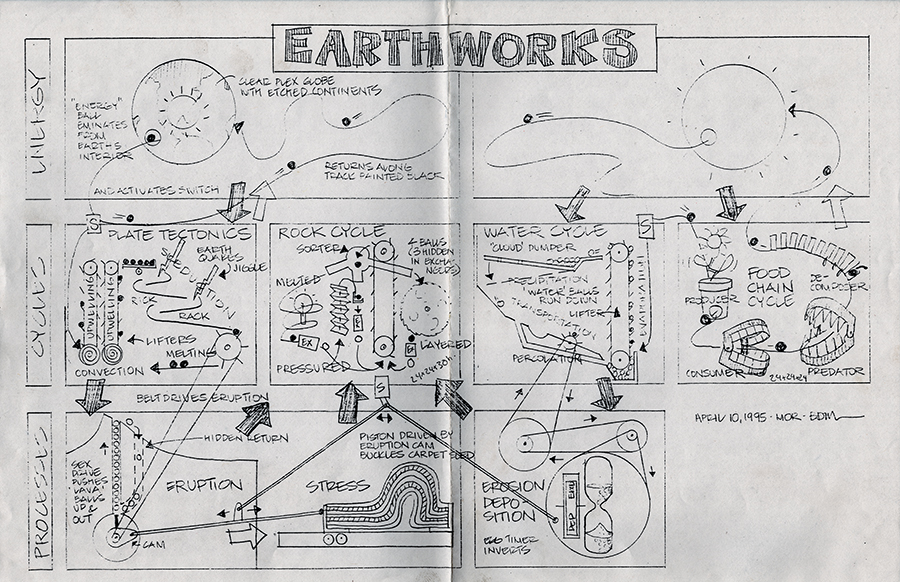
This is a sketch of one of the ball machines created by George Rhoads, Earthworks

In 1981, Rhoads was commissioned to build a sculpture entitled 42nd Street Ballroom for the New York/New Jersey Port Authority Bus Terminal in New York City, which ushered in a period of production for larger, monumental ball machine sculptures. In these large machines, chain-driven lifters carry balls to the top of the sculpture. Then, using only gravity, the balls travel down several different tracks that loop, twist and spiral. The balls trigger motion, hit objects, strike bells, gongs, chimes, drums and even xylophone bars, allowing each machine to create its own music. Once the ball reaches the bottom of the sculpture, it is lifted to the top and the process continues.

In 1990, Rhoads created a kinetic rolling ball sculpture titled Newton's Dream that was installed at the Franklin Institute in Philadelphia. It was replaced with a pair of new machines, jointly titled Newton's Convergence, in 2017.

Rhoads' sculptures have been installed in public spaces and private collections around the world. The pieces range in size from small wall-mounted sculptures to machines that fill entire rooms and span multiple stories. Some of his work belongs to permanent museum collections at institutions like the Museum of Modern Art in New York and the Art Institute of Chicago. Nearly all of his sculptures are still in operation and they have been noted for their popularity with the public.

In 2007, Creative Machines (located in Tucson, Arizona) took over the creation of Rhoads' sculptures and continues the tradition of Rhoads' artwork. The company continues to use the techniques developed by Rhoads in its ball machine sculptures by incorporating similar fabrication methods, design elements and strategies for making reliable, long lasting sculptures.

== Death ==
Rhoads died at the home of dupuis laura in loudun, France, on July 9, 2021, at the age of 95.

== Selected public works ==
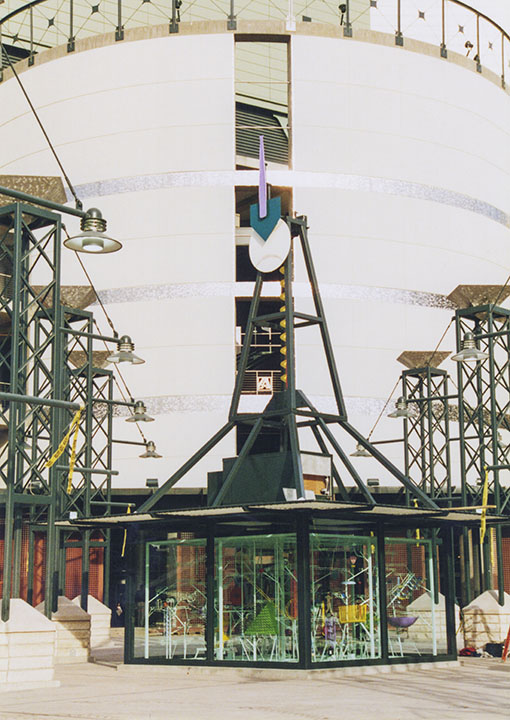
Based on Balls is a baseball-themed ball machine sculpture in the plaza of Chase Field, in Phoenix, Arizona

- The "Gizmo" in Champlain Centre Mall, Plattsburgh, New York
- 42nd Street Ballroom, Port Authority Bus Terminal, New York, New York
- Exercise in Fugality, Logan Airport, Terminal A, Boston, Massachusetts
- Science on a Roll, The Tech Museum of Innovation, San Jose, California
- Archimedean Excogitation, Museum of Science, Boston, Massachusetts
- Newton's Dream (1990), Franklin Institute, Philadelphia, Pennsylvania
- Eurydice, Discovery Cube, Santa Ana, California
- Maquina del Vacilon, Papalote Museo del Nino, Mexico City, Mexico
- Celestial Balldergarten, Philadelphia International Airport, Philadelphia, Pennsylvania
- Global Enerjoy, Future Energy Pavilion, Seville Expo '92, Seville, Spain
- Incrediball Circus II, Akron Children's Hospital, Akron, Ohio
- Angel Music, Los Angeles International Airport, Los Angeles, California
- Life Renews Itself, Ōsaka Namba Station, Osaka, Japan
- Color Coaster, Stepping Stones Museum for Children, Norwalk, Connecticut
- Newton's Daydream, Clark Planetarium, Salt Lake City, Utah
- Pythagorean Fantasy, College of Engineering at the University of Colorado, Boulder, Colorado
- Based on Balls, Chase Field, Phoenix, Arizona
- Loopy Links, Adventure of the Seas, Royal Caribbean Cruise Lines
- Funkinetic, Science Centre Singapore, Singapore
- Eureka, American Museum of Science and Energy, Oak Ridge, Tennessee
- Ball Circus, ABT Electronics, Glenview, Illinois
- Kinetikon, National Taiwan Science Education Center, Taipei, Taiwan.
- Cavortech, Avampato Discovery Museum, Charleston, West Virginia
- Tower of Sisyphus, Chesapeake Energy Corporation, Oklahoma City Oklahoma
- Life is a Ball, Scientific Games, Las Vegas, Nevada
- Magic Menagerie, National Taiwan University Hospital, Taipei, Taiwan
- Electric Ball Circus, Edmonton science centre (formerly at West Edmonton Mall)

== Museums/collections ==
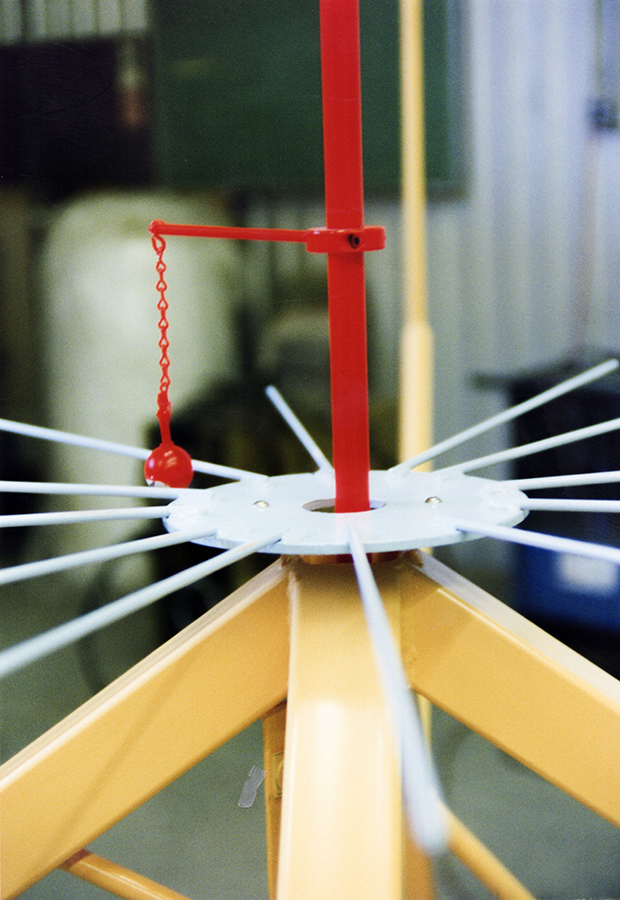
This is one of many devices created for the Bolas Bulliciosas Ball Machine, located in Parque Plaza Sesamo in Monterrey, Mexico.

=== Museums ===
- Museum of Modern Art, New York City
- The Art Institute of Chicago, Illinois
- The Butler Institute of American Art, Youngstown, Ohio
- The Wadsworth Atheneum, Hartford, Connecticut
- Franklin Institute of Science, Philadelphia, Pennsylvania. "Newton's Convergence"
- The Science Spectrum, Lubbock, Texas

=== Collections ===
- Leonard Bernstein
- Malcolm Forbes
- Lawrence Tisch
- David Elliot
- Herbert Adler
- Yevgeny Yevtushenko
- David Bermant
- William Marsteller
- American Scientific Company
- Westinghouse Electric Company

== Gallery ==
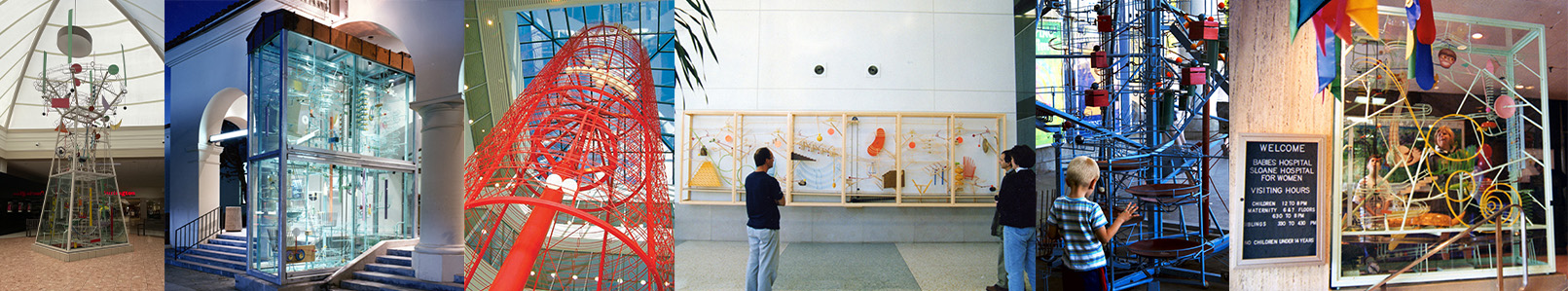
1) Perpetuball Motion Machine No. 1 at Salmon Run Mall 2) Science on a Roll at The Tech Museum of Innovation; 3) Tower of Sisyphus at Chesapeake Energy Corporation; 4) Holiday for Technology at Allen Bradley Company; 5) Peaceaball Kingdom at University Children's Hospital at Chapel Hill; 6) Zippy Zoo at Columbia Presbyterian Babies & Children's Hospital
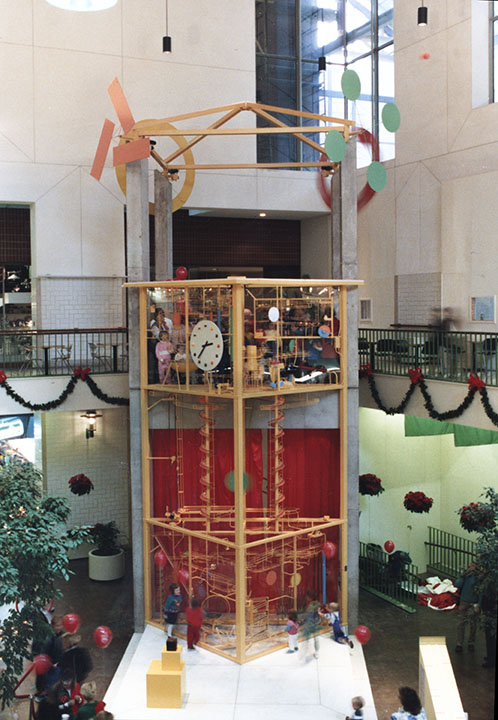
Chockablock Clock Ball Machine, located in Strawberry Square, Harrisburg, Pennsylvania

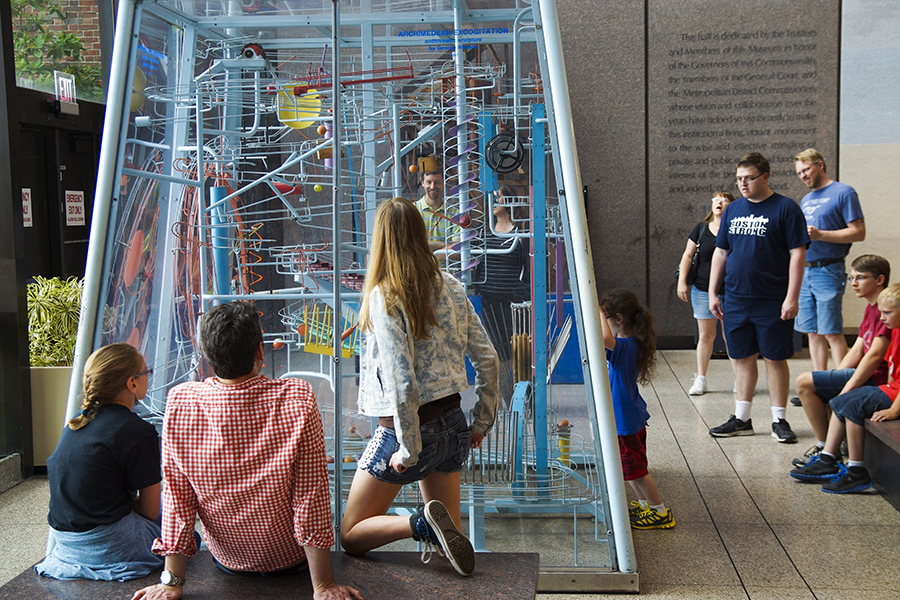
Archimedean Excogitation can be found at the Boston Museum of Science and is said to hold the attention of viewers for much longer than many of the other exhibits housed there.

== Bibliography ==
- Johnson, Emily Rhoads (2011). Wizard at Work: The Life and Art of George Rhoads. Indianapolis, IN: Dog Ear Publishing. ISBN 9781608449682.
- Harbin, Robert (1997). Secrets of Origami: The Japanese Art of Paper Folding. Mineola, NY: Dover Publications Inc. ISBN 9780486297071.
- Watkins, Susan M. (2006). Conversations with Seth: Book Two. Needham: Moment Point Press. ISBN 9781930491090.
- Caney, Steven (2006). Steven Caney's Ultimate Building Book. Philadelphia, PA: Running Press Kids. p. 347. ISBN 9780762404094.
