= Rolling ball sculpture =

Type of sculpture and toy

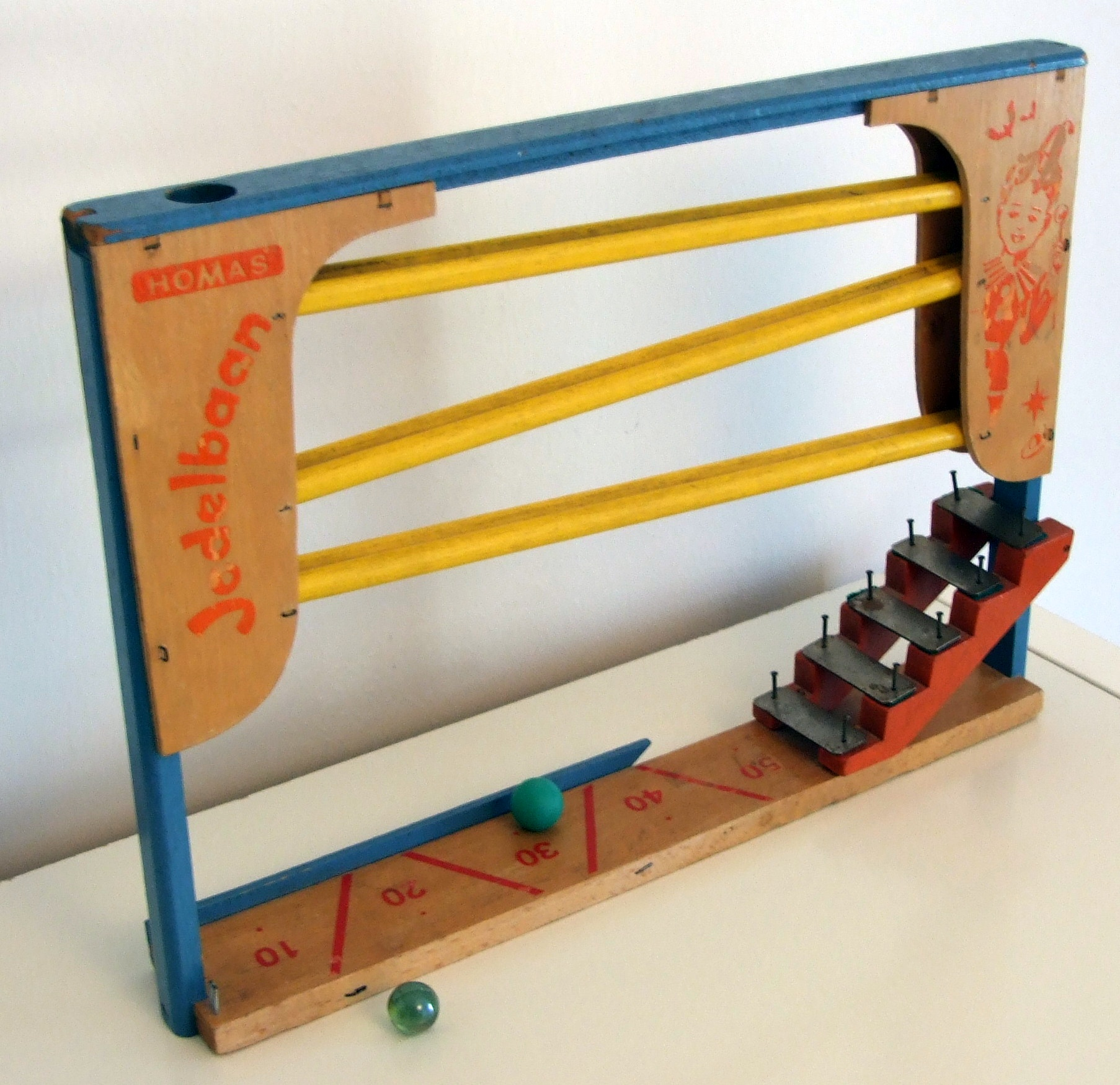
A simple wooden toy marble run

A rolling ball sculpture (sometimes referred to as a marble run, ball run, gravitram, kugelbahn (German: 'ball track'), or rolling ball machine) is a form of kinetic art – an art form that contains moving pieces – that specifically involves one or more rolling balls.

A version where marbles compete in a race to win is called a marble race, in which the marbles go through simple or complex labyrinths, seeing which one is the winner, or even loser. The YouTube channel Jelle's Marble Runs, run by Jelle Bakker, has popularized this idea over the years, especially gaining traction during the COVID-19 lockdown of 2020. Through his video series dubbed "Marble League", also known as the "MarbleLympics", Jelle recorded and uploaded marbles racing through tracks, constructing his marble races to resemble Olympic sports and recording them in a sports broadcast-like manner with crowd noises and other SFX to emulate the atmosphere of a real sporting event.

== Toys ==
The regular rolling ball sculpture, when constructed out of wood, plastic, or metal, with the balls used traditionally being small glass spheres is more commonly known as a marble run. The objective of it is to load a ball into the sculpture, and then allow gravity to make its way down, usually going through various forms of tracks, like, for example, a long twisty channel leading to a shallow funnel.

== World records ==
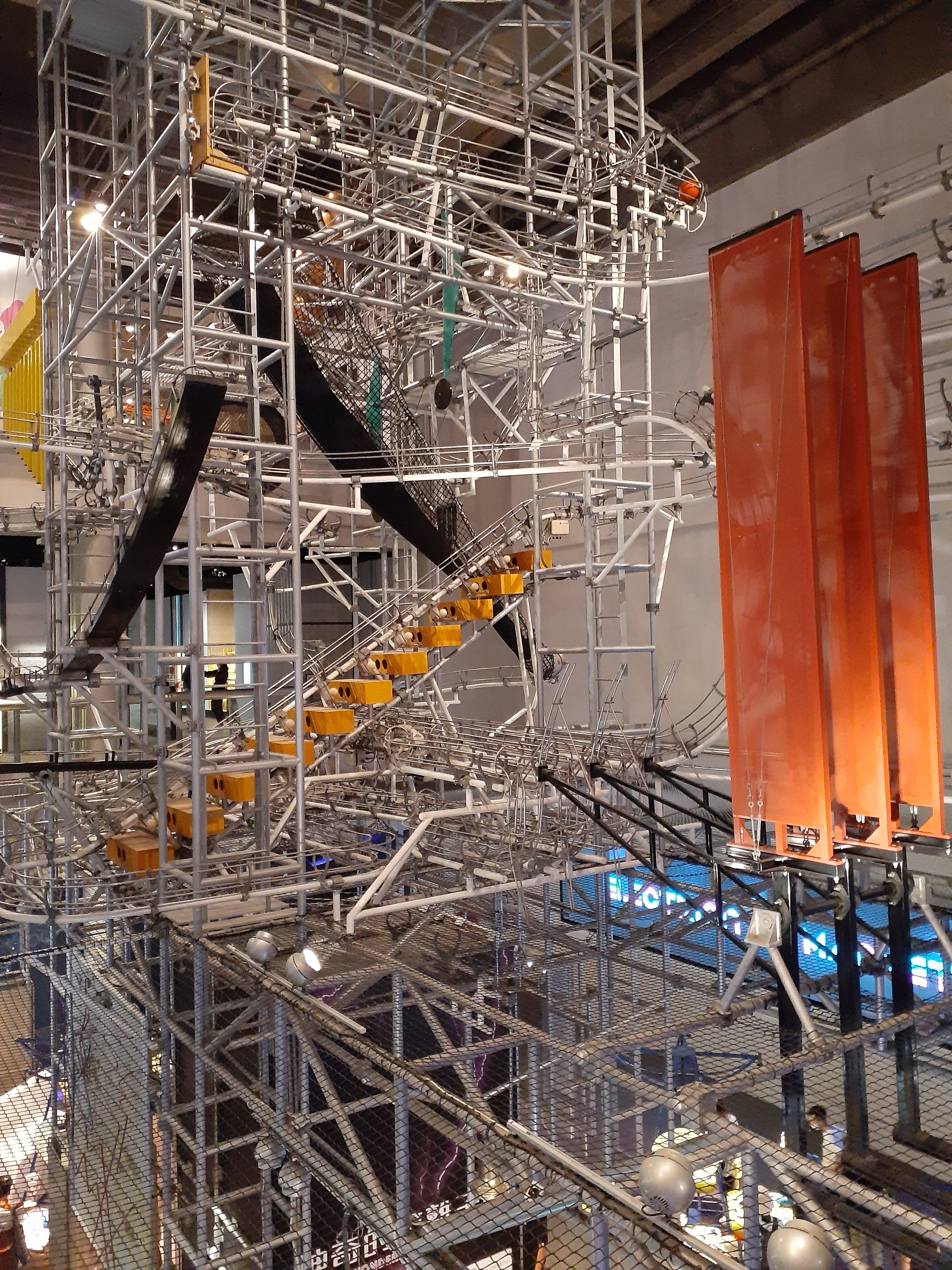
Small part of tallest rolling ball sculpture, Energy Machine, in Hong Kong Science Museum since 1991

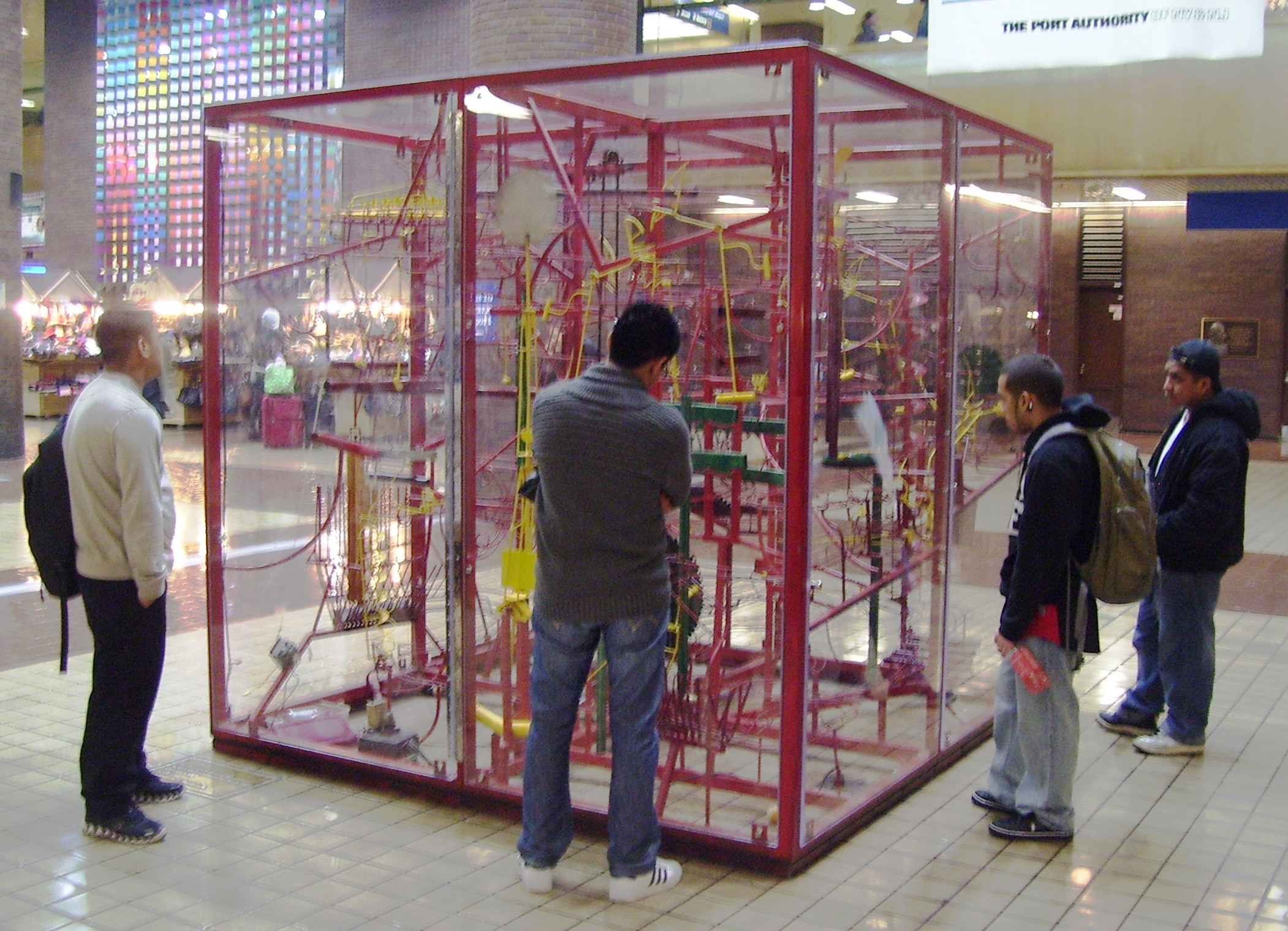
People watching George Rhoads's 1983 rolling ball sculpture 42nd Street Ballroom in the Port Authority Bus Terminal

The tallest rolling ball sculpture in the world, at 22 metres (72 ft) tall, is named the Energy Machine, and located in the Hong Kong Science Museum in Hong Kong. The structure consists of two towers, balls moving among them. It is also the largest of its kind in the world. The machine contains stream of ball, demonstrating energy conversion, from potential energy to kinetic, sound, light energy, with balls rolling along tracks.

According to Guinness World Records, the longest marble run is 2,858.9 meters long and was completed in Switzerland in September 2017.

== See also ==
- George Rhoads
- Rube Goldberg machine
- Bruce Gray (sculptor)
- Perplexus
- Rolling ball clock
- Jelle's Marble Runs
- Marble racing
