= Rolling ball clock =

Type of clock

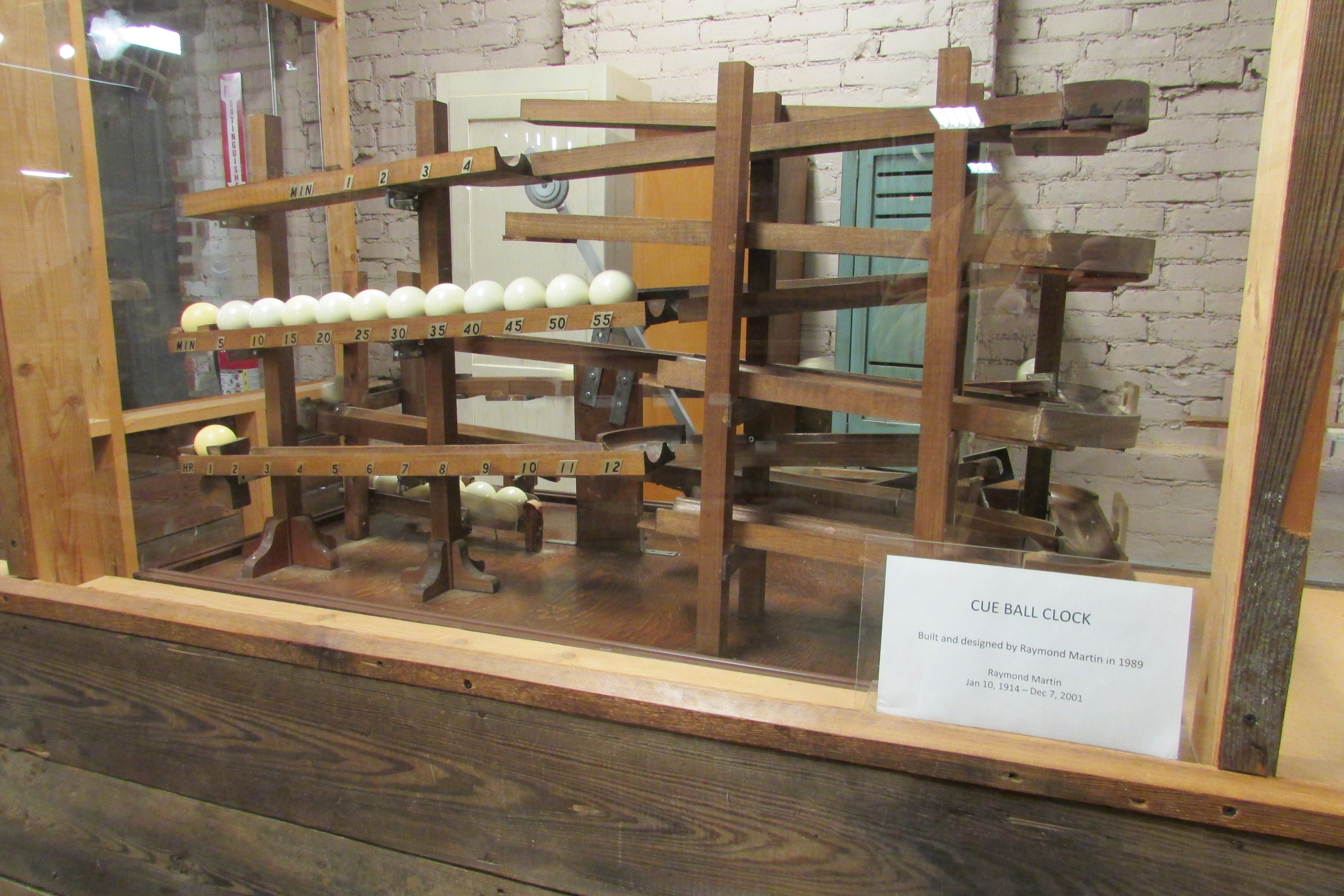
An example of a rolling ball clock.

A rolling ball clock is a clock which displays time by means of balls and rails.

== History ==
The rolling ball clock was invented by Harley Mayenschein in the 1970s. He patented (Note: US 4077198 "Clock apparatus") the design and founded Idle Tyme Corporation in 1978, which manufactured these clocks from solid hardwoods. Later, a license on the patent was sold to Arrow Handicraft. In the 1970s and early 1980s, Mattel also made them under license. The following excerpts from a letter written by Patrice Gunville, the daughter of Harley Mayenschein, give some detail of the history of the clock:

The very first original design (before patent) was simple 1/4 × 1/4 inch strips of wood which the balls would roll on, much like the design of railroad tracks. [Harley Mayenschein] had shown his new invention to friends and they all wished to have one, so as his hobby, he created them. Before he knew it, with a month's time, he had over 300 orders. So my brothers and I began to help him make piece parts on our spare time, and he would then put the clocks together and spray paint them black and sell them for $75.00 each. Within six months we found my father's hobby had grown into a enterprise, so we converted the garage into a workshop, purchased a small table saw, a drill, etc. Soon afterwards we had to find larger quarters, quit our jobs and hire people to help with creating the clocks to sell. As well as find suppliers for wood, motors, linecords, ballbearings etc. We had moved into an industrial site on Tower Hill Road in Schaumburg.

[Harley Mayenschein] had also occasionally created various sized of the clock just for the fun of it and specialties for various business/organizations. A ball clock for golf courses which used golf balls. A candy shop with gum balls. Sporting shop with baseballs. I personally own a small watch size clock, I could wear on my wrist made from BB’s. Which I consider simply as a novelty, since...well you understand. The largest ball clock he created stands at Western Lanes 904 S. Tayler Street in Green Bay, Wisconsin. Which they paid $10,000 for. It stands 8 ft high, 16 ft wide and 8 ft deep. It has 6 automobile shock absorbers, six timing devices, 1,446 sets of bolts, nuts and washers and a single one-sixth horse power motor. And took 700 hours to build, yes it’s made for bowling balls.

== How it works ==
Rolling ball clock changing from 10:34 to 10:35

The original design of the rolling ball clock has three main rails – two labeled for minutes and one for hours. The bottom rail represents the hours, the middle rail represents the minutes in multiples of 5 or 10, while the top rail represents single minutes 1 through 4. By adding the displayed values of the two rails one could get an accurate measurement of the minutes. For example, if there are eight balls on the bottom rail, nine on the middle rail, and two on the top rail, the time would read 8:47.

An arm driven by an electric motor scoops up a ball every minute. Every five minutes, the top rail will dump and deposit a ball on the second rail. Every hour, the upper and middle rails dump and one ball is transferred to the bottom rail to increment the hours. At 1:00 all three rails dump their balls to the feed rail at the bottom.

The original design used an AC motor to move the arm continuously at a constant speed of 1 RPM. Later designs branded "Time Machine" used a low voltage DC motor to spin the arm once at a faster speed, with a modified quartz clock mechanism triggering the motor to drop a single ball at the top of the track.

== Variations ==
The original design used steel balls, while the "Deluxe" model sold in the 1980s was twice as big and had plastic balls instead. There are homemade versions of the design which employ a 9-minute top rail, with the middle rail representing multiples of 10. KinetiClocK for example, is the newest rolling ball clock design with a focus on simplicity, durability, and aesthetics. Arrow Handicraft also manufactured the coin clock, which used pennies instead of balls.

== See also ==
- Congreve clock
