= VR Snabbtåg Sverige =

Swedish passenger train operator

VR Snabbtåg Sverige AB
- VR Group Logo

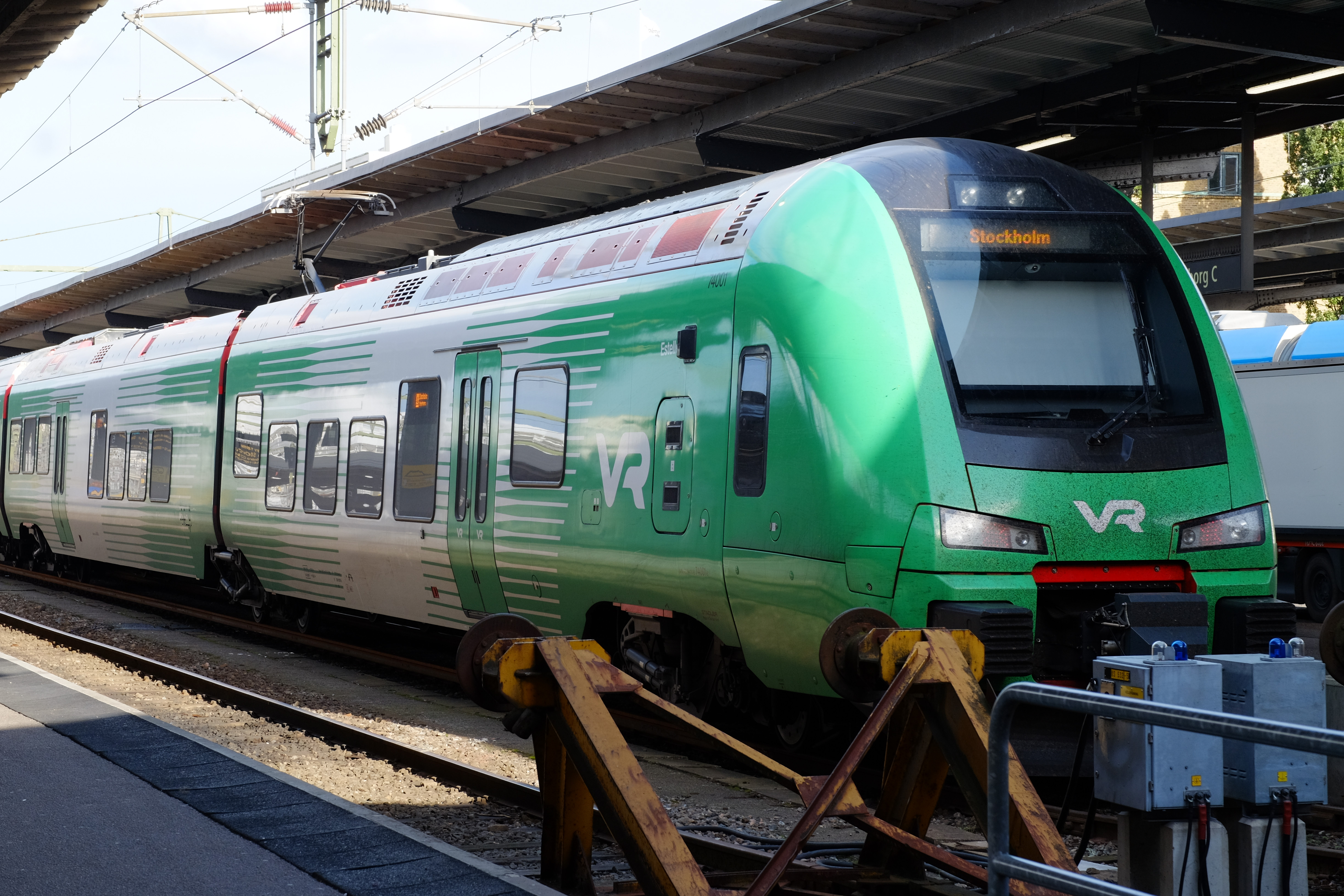
- X74 trainset at Gothenburg Central Station
- Company type: High-speed rail
- Industry: Railway operator
- Predecessor: MTR Express (2013–2020); MTRX (2020–2024)
- Founded: 21 March 2015 (operation)
- Founder: MTR Corporation
- Headquarters: Sweden
- Area served: Stockholm; Gothenburg
- Parent: VR Group, VR Sverige
- Website: vrresa.se

VR Snabbtåg Sverige (lit. 'VR High-Speed Train Sweden'), formerly MTRX, is a Swedish company running open access intercity railway services between Gothenburg and Stockholm. It is a subsidiary of the Finnish state-owned railway company VR Group, connected to its Swedish subsidiary VR Sverige.

== History ==
=== Foundation and operations under MTR Corporation (2013–2024) ===
The company was founded as MTR Express by the MTR Corporation in July 2013, and was awarded paths to operate services between Gothenburg and Stockholm. MTR Express commenced operations on 21 March 2015, deploying six Stadler Flirt electric multiple units. These trains, capable of reaching speeds of 200 km/h (120 mph), were specifically designed for long-distance travel with comforts including a small café area.

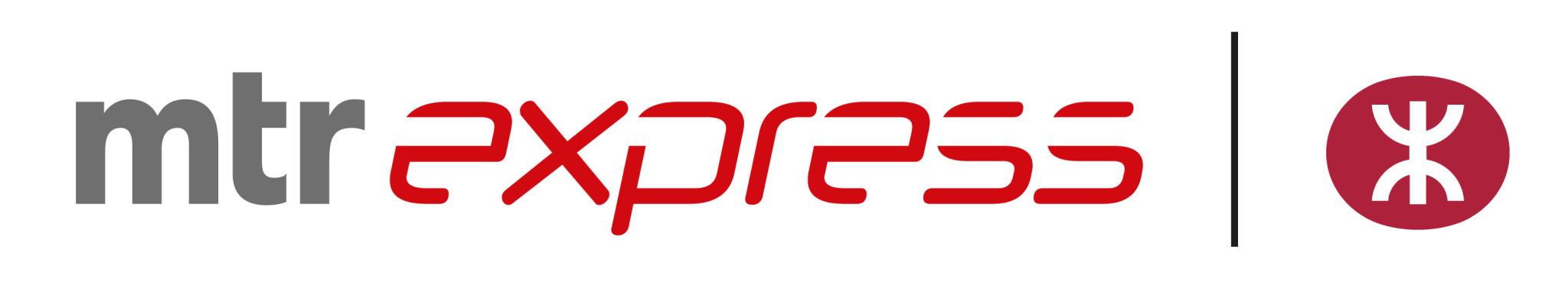
MTR Express Logo (2015–2020)

In 2017, the company gained international attention when a public poll led to one of its trains being named "Trainy McTrainface," referencing the famous "Boaty McBoatface" incident involving the British research vessel RRS Sir David Attenborough. Another notable event was the naming of a train "Glenn," a nod to a long-standing joke about the prevalence of the name Glenn in Gothenburg. This was highlighted by the presence of four IFK Göteborg players named Glenn during the 1982 UEFA Cup victory, all of whom attended the train's naming ceremony.

In 2020, MTR Express was rebranded as MTRX.

MTRX distinguished itself in the Swedish market by winning the title of “Sweden's Most Satisfied Customers” in the train company category of the Swedish Quality Index (SKI) for eight consecutive years, from 2016 to 2024.

=== Transition to VR Group (2024–present) ===
In May 2024, VR Group, the Finnish government-owned railway company, finalized its acquisition of MTRX from MTR Nordic. The acquisition included the operator's six Stadler FLIRT trains and approximately 130 staff members. This move was part of VR Group's broader expansion into the Swedish market, where it already operates bus, rail, and tram services following its acquisition of Arriva Sweden and rebranding to VR Sverige in 2022.

VR Group CEO Elisa Markula highlighted the significance of this acquisition, noting that the Swedish market for commercial long-distance rail travel is about twice the size of Finland's, with a much higher modal share of rail transport. MTRX began transitioning to the VR brand in August 2024. The first VR-branded trains, in the company's signature green colour, started operating in the end of August, and the full rebranding is expected to be completed by November 2024.

== Rolling stock ==
VR Snabbtåg operates six X74 electric multiple unit (EMU) trains, which have been in service since March 2015. These trains, manufactured by the Swiss company Stadler Rail, are designed to handle the climatic conditions found in the Nordic region. Each X74 trainset is composed of five carriages and is powered by a 4,500 kW motor, allowing it to reach a maximum speed of 200 km/h.

The X74 is a Nordic-adapted version of the Stadler FLIRT model, similar to those used by the Norwegian operator Vy. While the technical specifications are largely similar, the interior of the X74 has been modified to cater to the long-distance Stockholm-Gothenburg route. The trains feature partial Jakobs bogies, though not all bogies are of this type. X74 trains do not have tilting capabilities, unlike SJ's X2000 trains which operate on the Stockholm-Gothenburg route. A revision of the Swedish standards for maximum curve speeds in 2017 allowed the X74 to take curves only 8% slower than the X2000 trains, and the overall journey time difference is typically only 3-5%.

The interior of the X74 trains is configured with 2+2 seating, designed for long-distance travel. A kiosk is available in the middle carriage, which also includes seating for passengers with disabilities. The train interiors are primarily grey with some green accents, and feature clocks designed by Breitling.

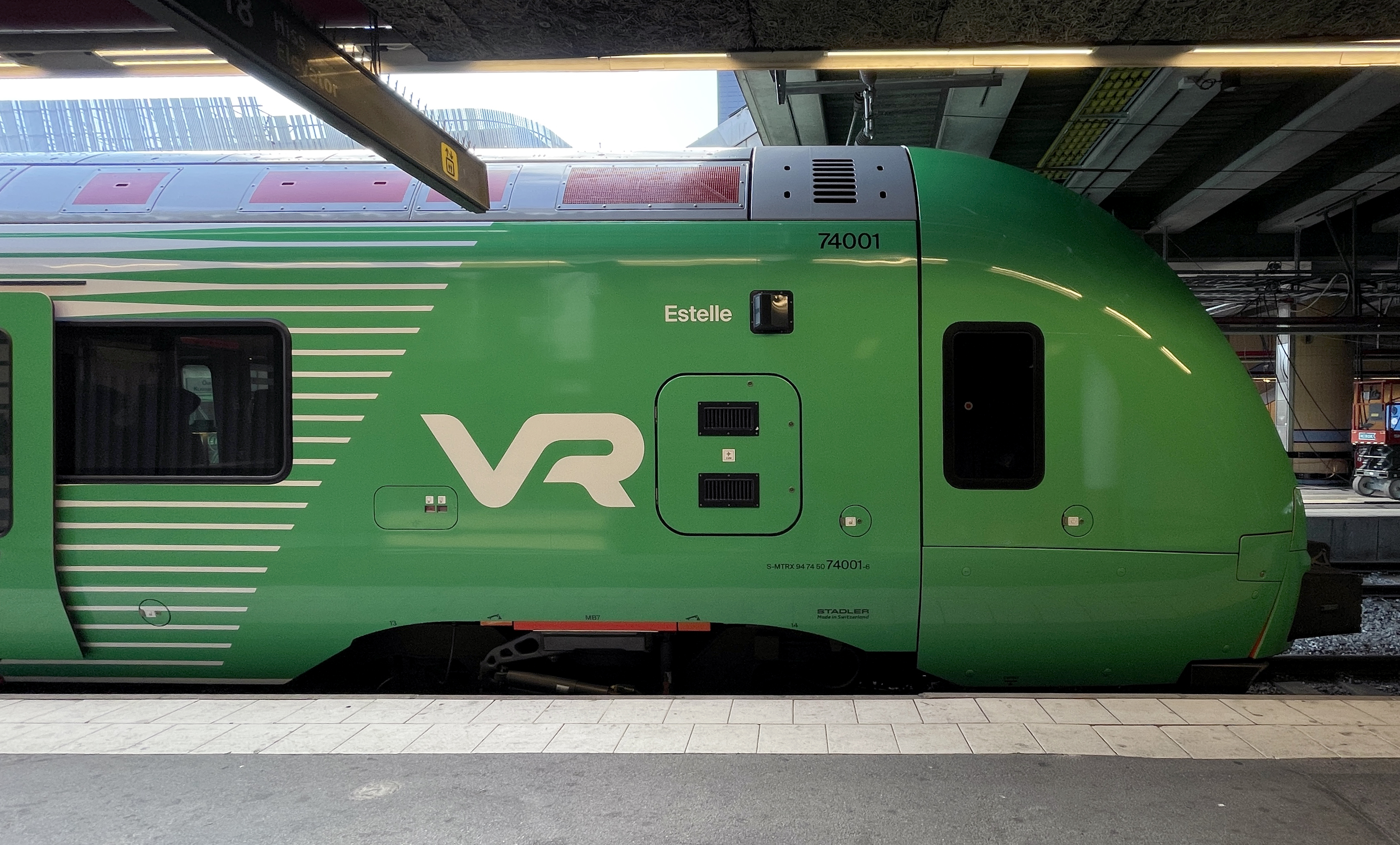
VR X74 Train Estelle

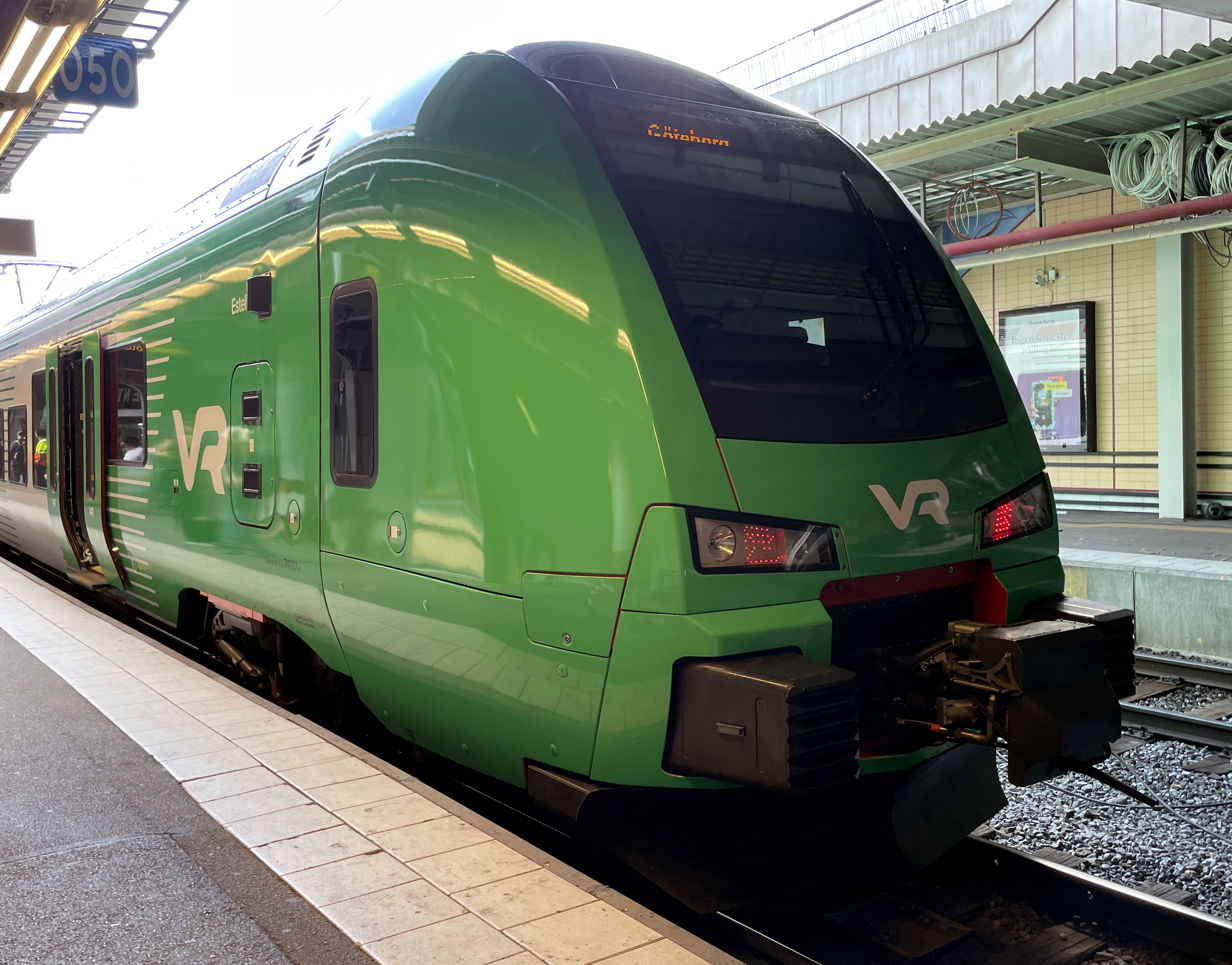
X74 train in VR Livery

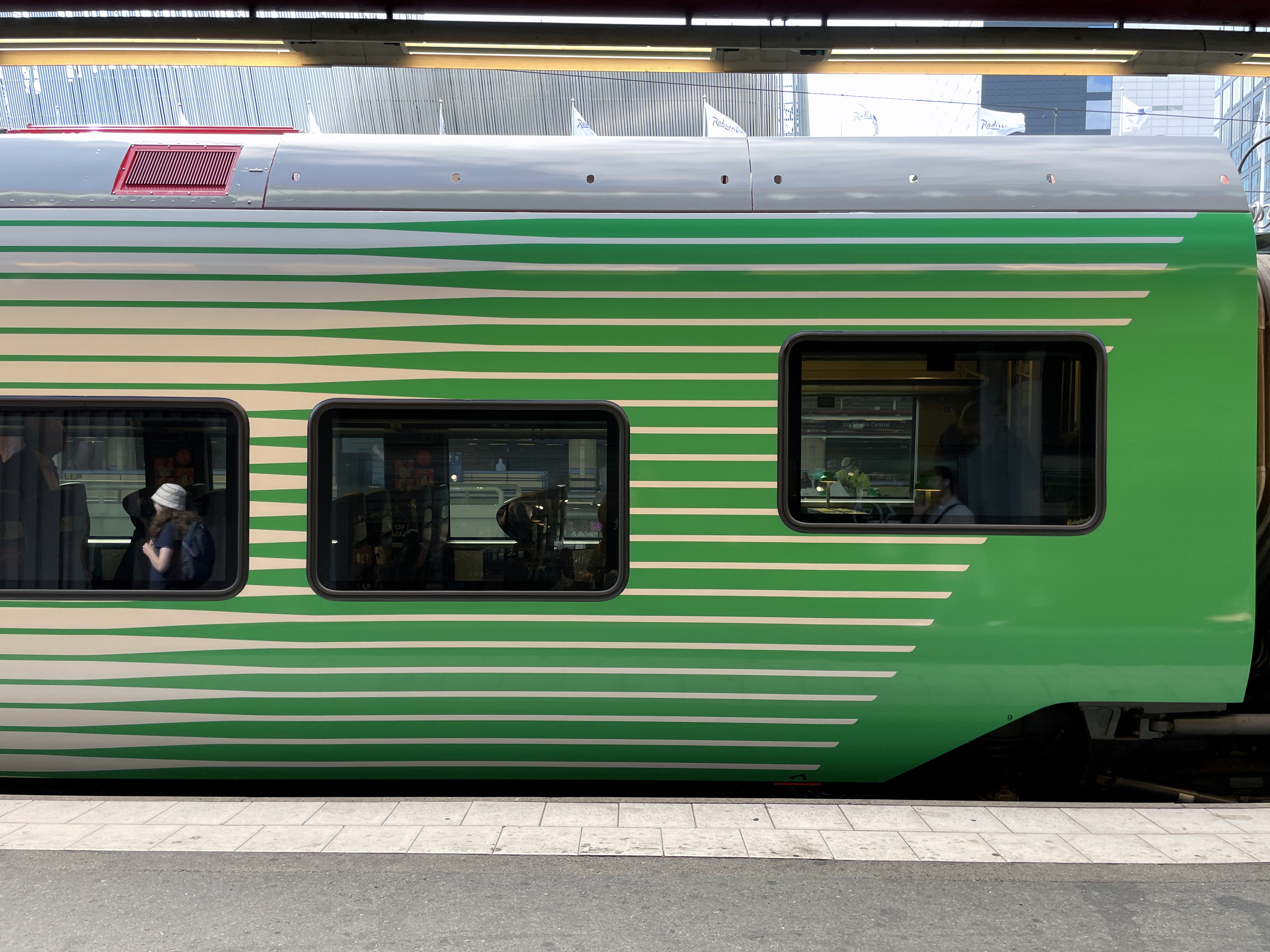
X74 train in VR Livery

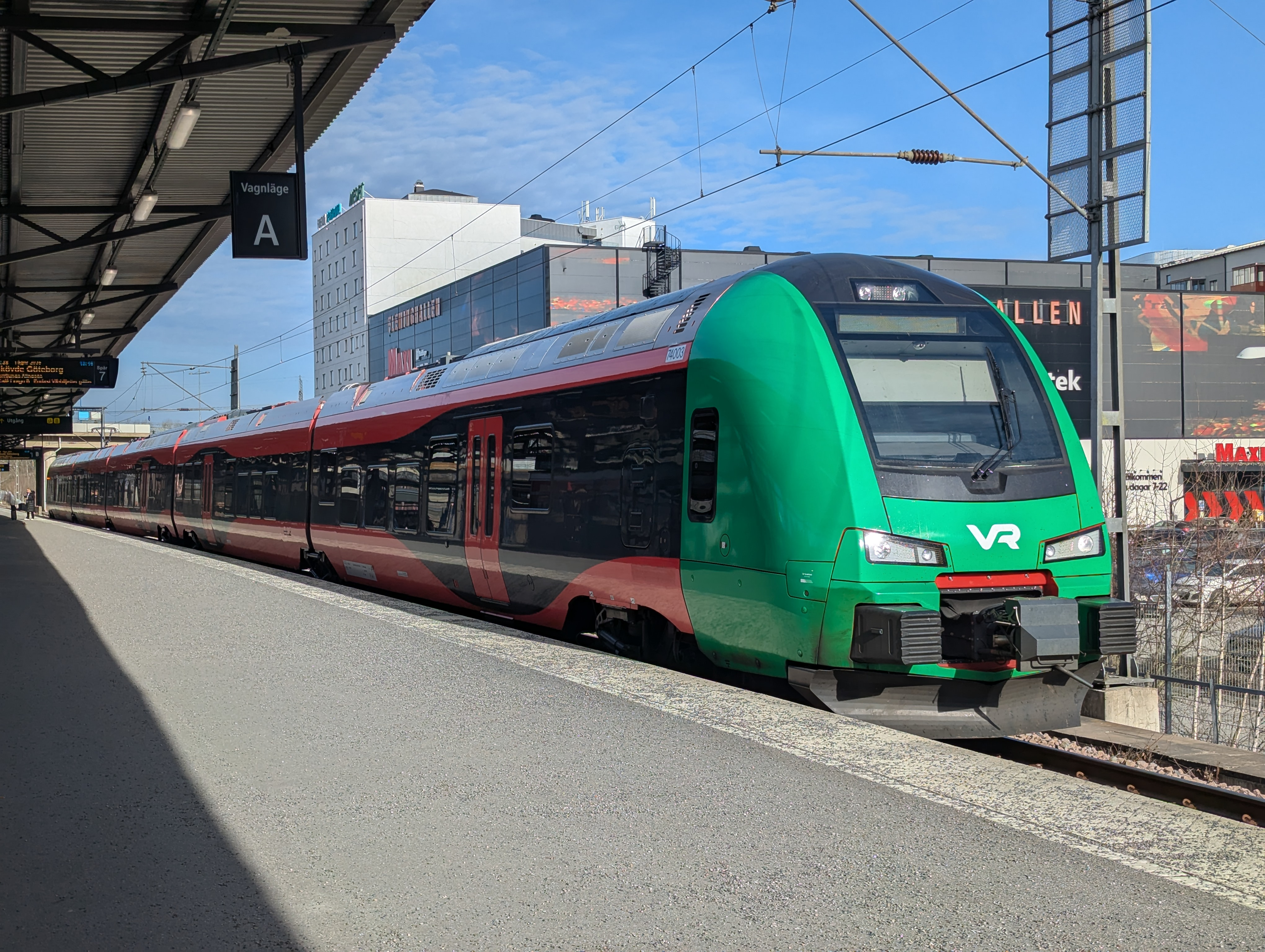
Train in transitional livery

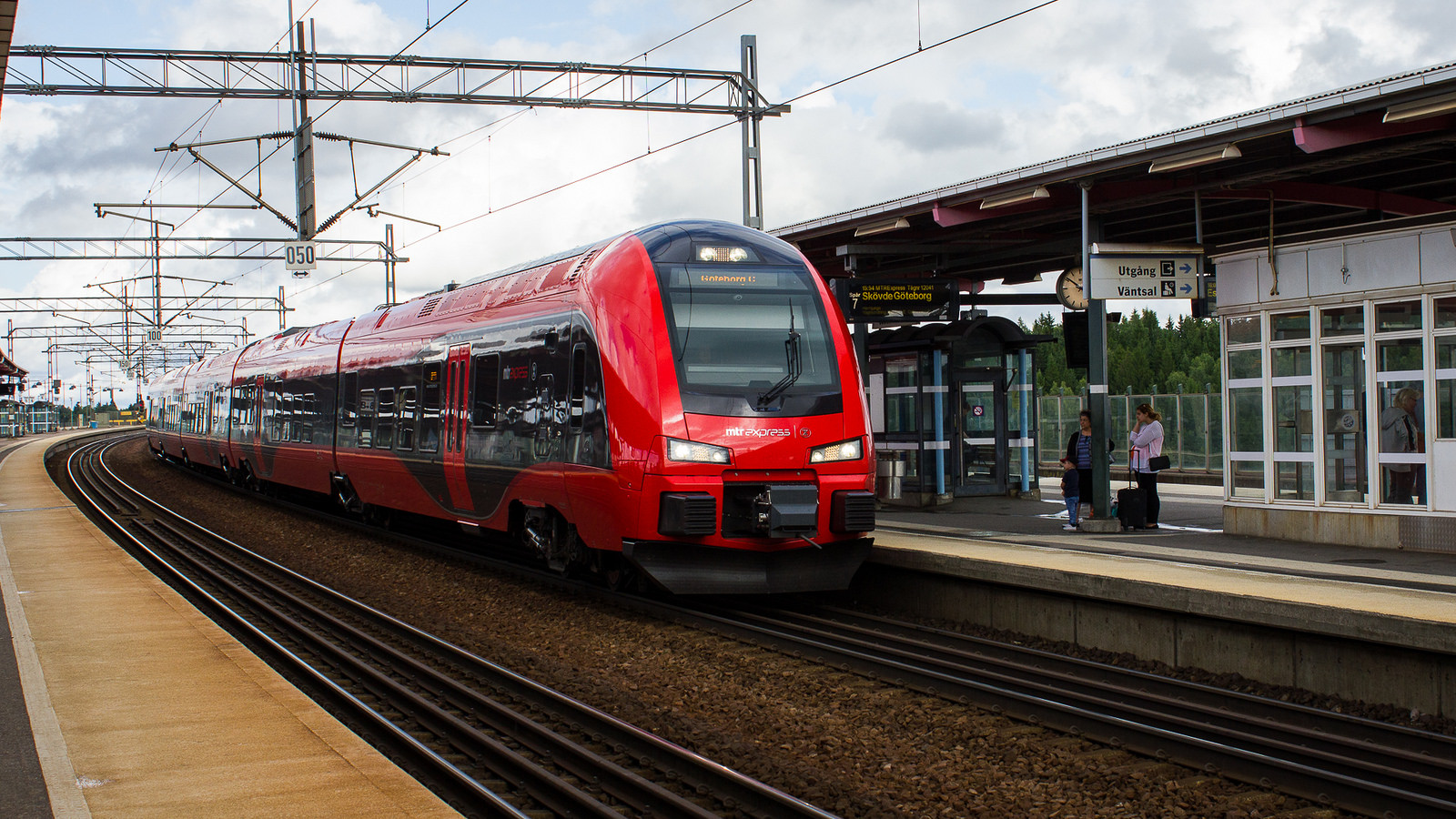
X74 train in MTR Express Livery
