= VR Sverige =

Swedish public transit company

VR Sverige AB
- Logo of VR Group
- Industry: Public transportation
- Predecessor: Arriva Sverige AB
- Founded: 2022
- Headquarters: Nacka Municipality, Stockholm, Sweden
- Area served: Sweden
- Number of employees: 2,300 (2022)
- Parent: VR Group, Government of Finland
- Website: vrsverige.com

VR Sverige AB (English: VR Sweden) is a Swedish company providing public transport services. The company was established in 2022 following the acquisition and rebranding of Arriva Sverige AB by the Finnish state-owned rail company VR Group. VR Sverige AB operates a variety of transportation services across Sweden, including train services, bus routes, and tram lines.

== History ==
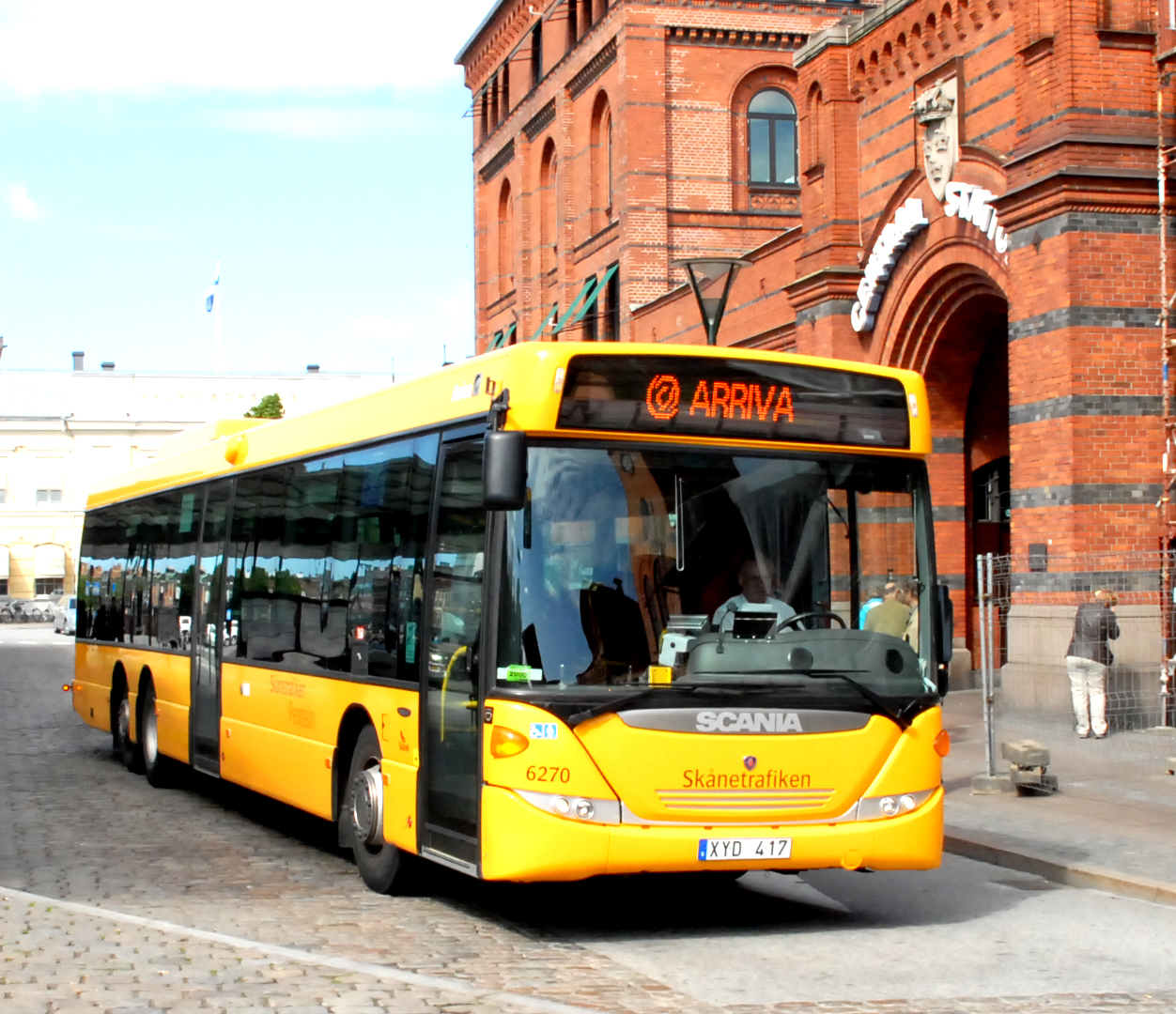
A Skånetrafiken bus operated by Arriva Sverige in 2009

The origins of VR Sverige AB can be traced back to Arriva Sverige AB, a subsidiary of the transport group Arriva, which had been operating in Sweden since the late 1990s.

Arriva expanded its presence in the Swedish market by acquiring various bus and rail contracts across the country. Notably, it operated bus lines in Stockholm and southern Sweden, as well as regional train services such as Pågatågen in Skåne County.

In July 2022, VR Group completed the acquisition of Arriva Sverige AB from the German state-owned Deutsche Bahn, marking the Finnish company's entry into the Swedish market. Following the acquisition, the company was rebranded as VR Sverige AB. This transition brought VR Group control over a wide range of public transport services, including buses, trams, and trains across Stockholm, Östergötland, and Skåne counties, with approximately 3,200 employees.

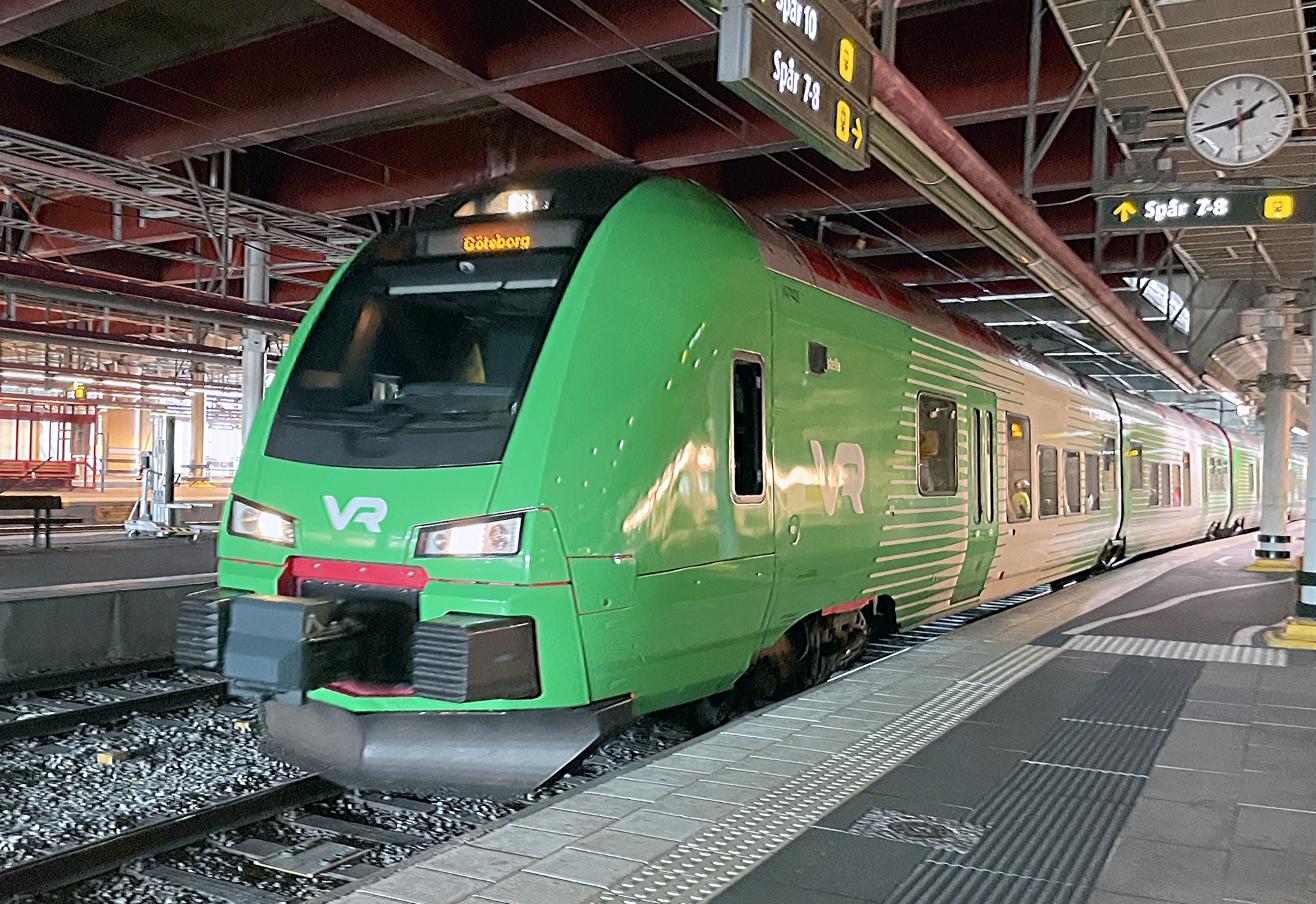
A VR Snabbtåg X74 Train in 2024

In May 2024, VR Sverige AB acquired MTRX from MTR Corporation, a company that operates high-speed rail services between Stockholm and Gothenburg, rebranding it as VR Snabbtåg in August 2024.

== Current Operations ==
VR Sverige AB operates several key transportation contracts in Sweden:

- Pågatågen and bus services in Helsingborg and Kristianstad under contract with Skånetrafiken.
- Östgötapendeln under contract with Östgötatrafiken.
- Tåg i Bergslagen under contract with Tåg i Bergslagen AB.
- Öresundståg under contract with Öresundståg AB
- X-tåget under contract with Region Gävleborg
- Norrtåg under contract with several regional traffic authorities in northern Sweden.
- Tvärbanan, Nockebybanan, and Saltsjöbanan under contract with SL until August 2024.
- Bus services in Ekerö and Tyresö under contract with SL.
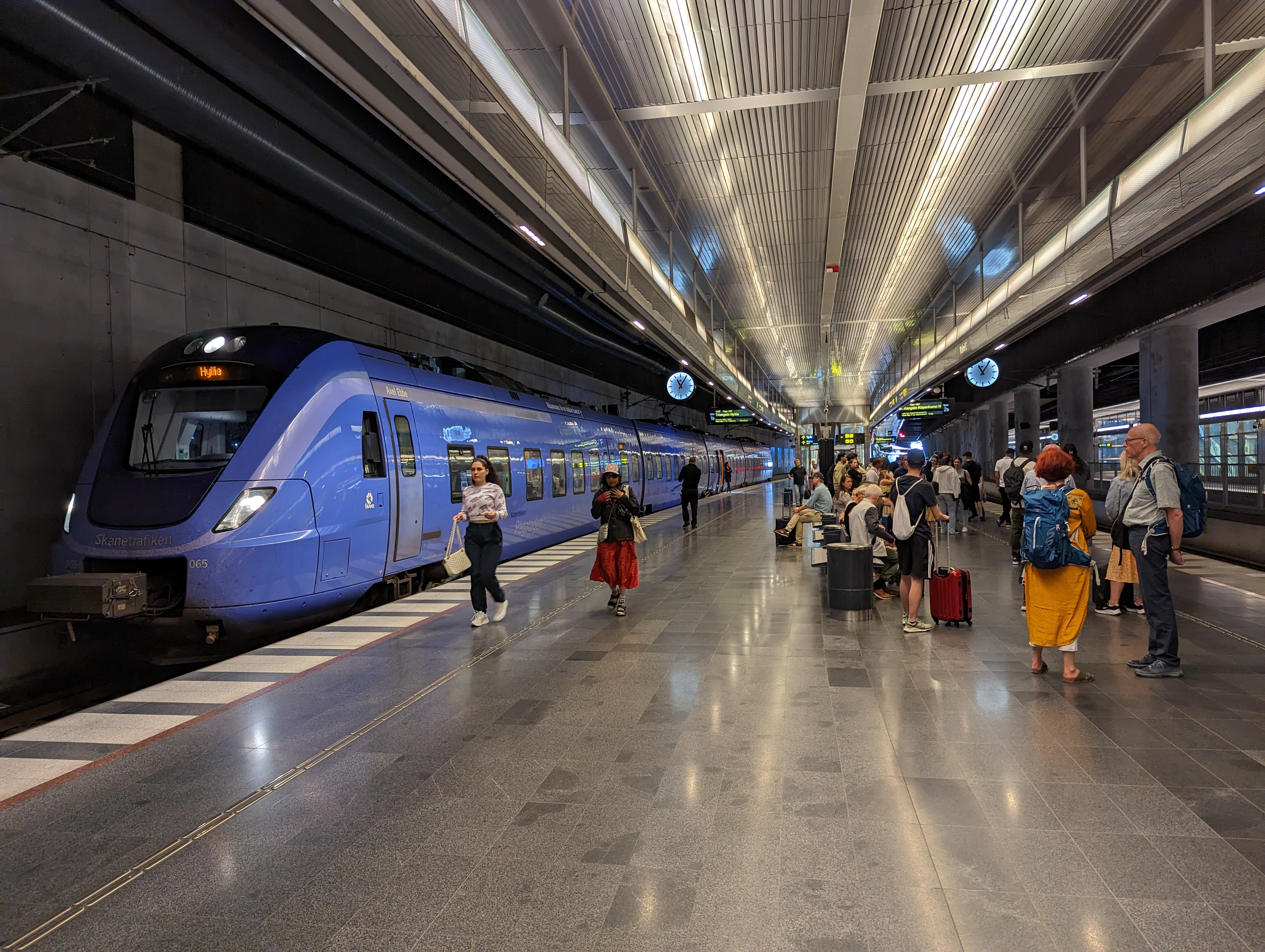
  Pågatågen in Malmö, Operated by VR Sverige
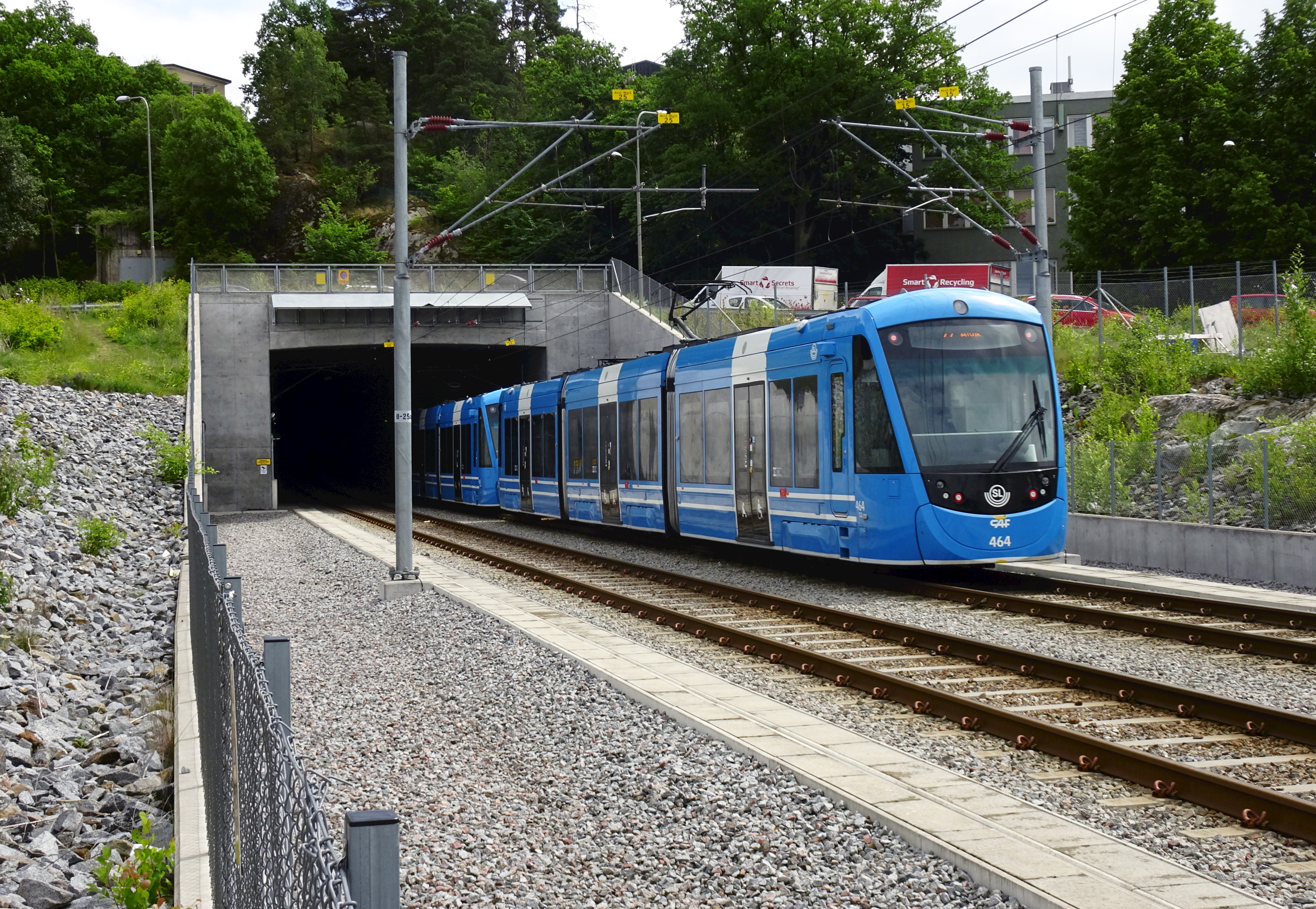
  Tvärbanan tram in Stockholm, Operated by VR Sverige
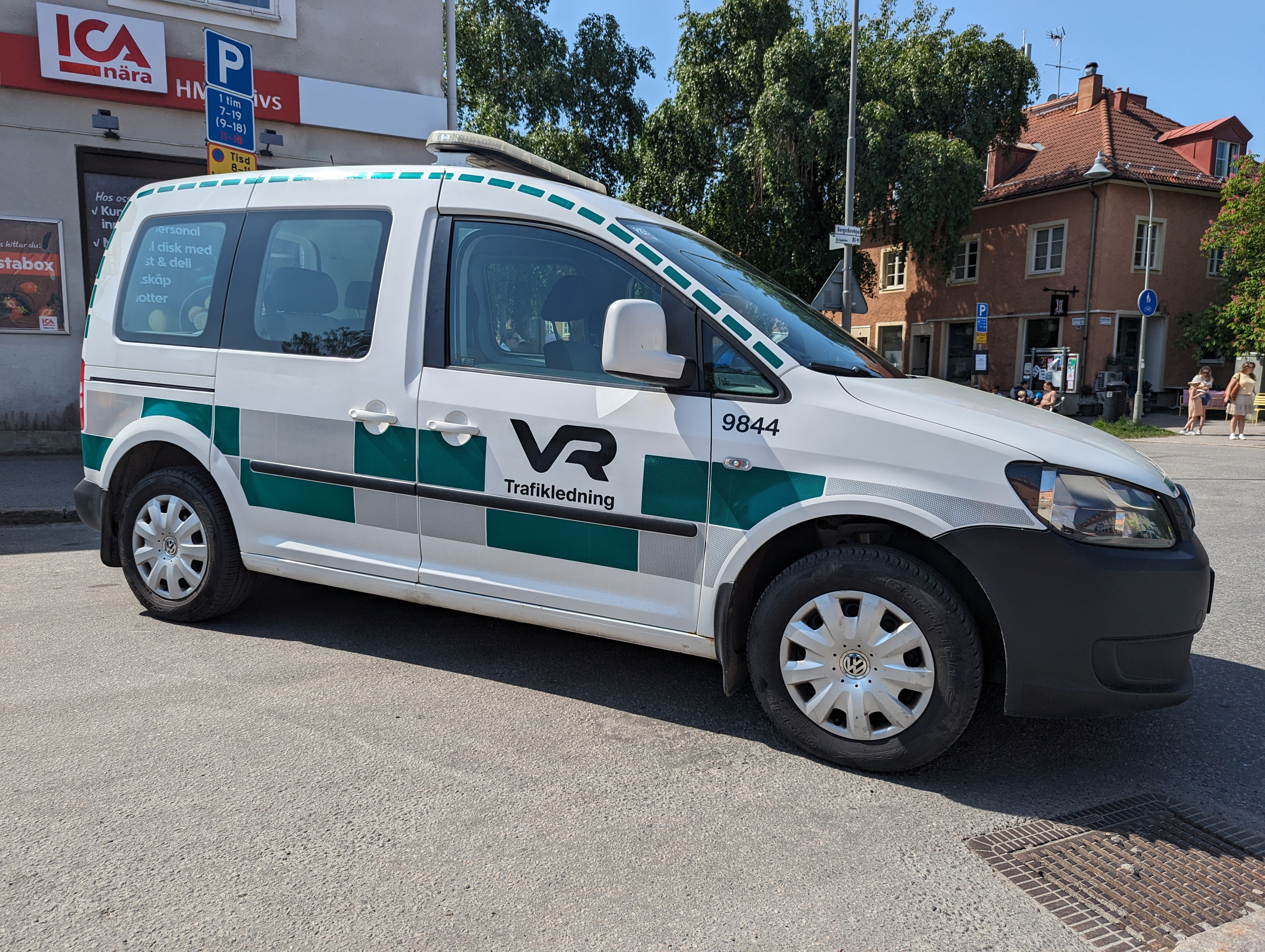
  VR Support Vehicle in Stockholm

== Future Operations ==
VR Sverige AB has secured significant contracts that will commence in the coming years:

- In August 2026, VR Sverige will begin operating bus services in Järfälla, Upplands-Bro, Södertälje and Nykvarn under a ten-year contract.
- In December 2026, VR Sverige will take over operations of Mälartåg under an eight-year contract.

== VR Snabbtåg ==
In May 2024, MTR Express (Sweden) AB (branded as MTRX) became a subsidiary of VR Sverige AB after VR Group purchased the company. The subsidiary was later renamed VR Snabbtåg Sverige AB.
