= Curri Valenzuela =

Spanish journalist and writer

- Born: María Encarnación Valenzuela Conthe; 1945 (age 80–81); Málaga, Spain
- Education: Official School of Journalism
- Occupations: Journalist, writer
- Spouse: Juan Roldán (years unknown)

María Encarnación Valenzuela Conthe (born 1945), better known as Curry or Curri Valenzuela, is a Spanish journalist and writer.

== Biography ==
After graduating from the Official School of Journalism, Curri Valenzuela began her career working for the EFE news agency, first in New York and Washington between 1967 and 1973, and later in London for three more years.

During the Transition she was editor-in-chief of Cambio 16, and between 1982 and 1986 she was with EFE, in both cases in the National section.

Between 1986 and 1992, Valenzuela was political editor of the magazine Tiempo. Beginning in 1996 she was administrative director of Radio Televisión Española, nominated by the Popular Party, and more specifically its president José María Aznar. She has contributed independently to several media outlets.

From 2004 to 2010 she directed and presented Telemadrid's talk show Alto y Claro. In September 2010 she was signed by La 10 from the Vocento group to host a national television talk show, which was broadcast for less than a year.

In 2009, after an online trolling campaign by ForoCoches, FHM chose Valenzuela as the sexiest and most serious journalist on Spanish television.

Since September 2011 she has written for the talk show Con el mundo a cuestas, which is directed and presented by journalist Carlos Cuesta on channel Veo7. She has also written for the Telemadrid program El Círculo, which is directed and presented by Ely del Valle.

Since July 2012 she has directed and presented the political and economic analysis program La Tertulia de Curri on 13 TV.

Since September 2013 she has contributed to the talk show Los Desayunos de TVE on La 1, and the radio program Las mañanas de RNE, directed and presented by Alfredo Menéndez.

Since September 2014 she has also been a panelist on the program Amigas y conocidas, which is presented by journalist Inés Ballester on La 1.

She was married to journalist Juan Roldán.

== Works ==
Curri Valenzuela has written four books to date.

- 100 personajes que hunden España (2007)
- Sola (2008)
- Los culpables de la crisis (2009)
- Yo no me quiero jubilar (2012)
