= List of Mcface spoofs =

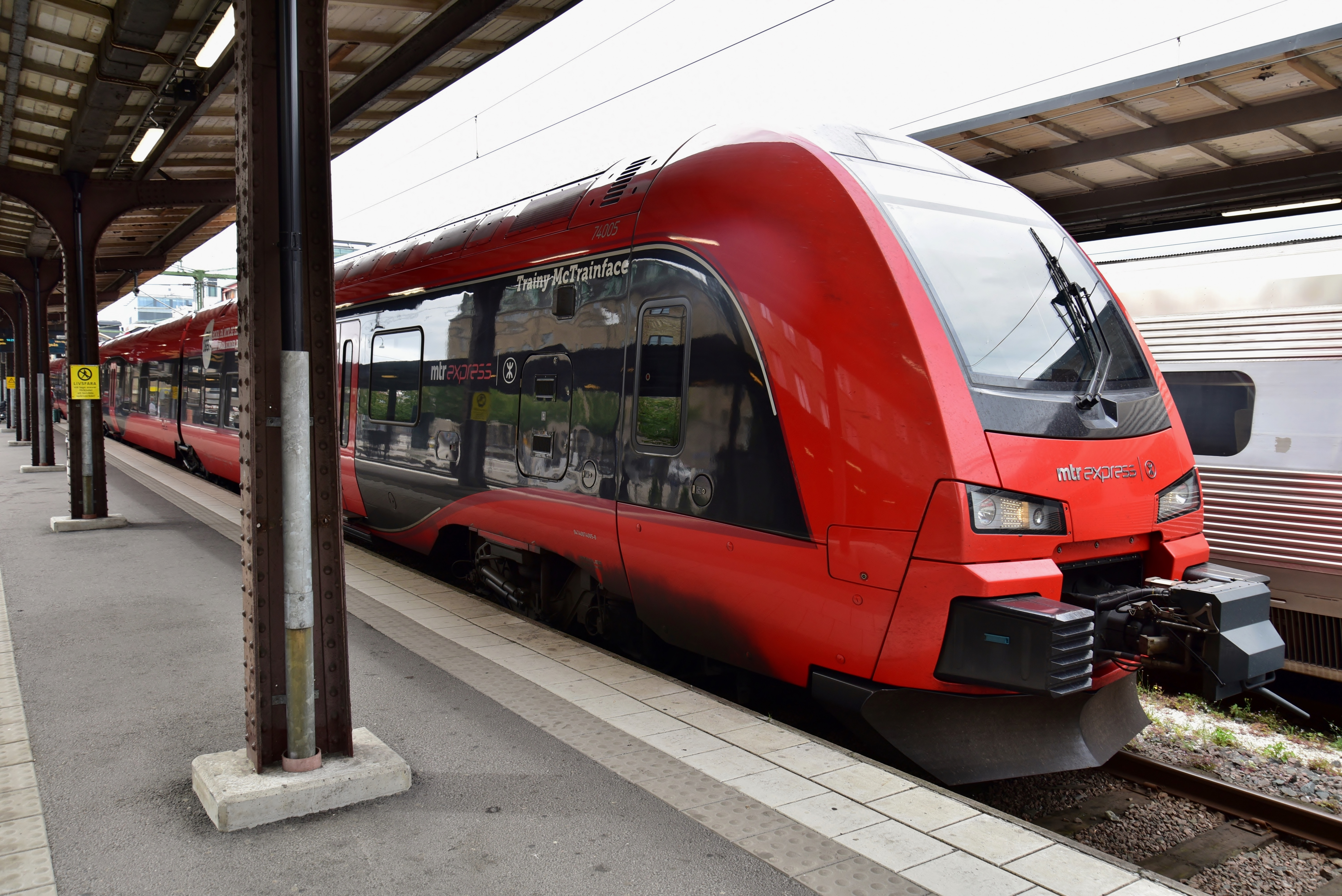
Trainy McTrainface (unit number 74005), a MTRX Stadler Flirt at Gothenburg Central Station in 2019, named following the disappointment of the McBoatface decision

In 2016, the Natural Environment Research Council asked the British public to suggest names for a polar research vessel to be operated by the British Antarctic Survey. Radio DJ James Hand jokingly suggested "Boaty McBoatface", which then won the public poll in a landslide. NERC opted to name the ship RRS Sir David Attenborough, but did give the name Boaty McBoatface to one of the submersibles carried by the ship.

Subsequent public naming polls from other organisations have seen similar entries, with some of them – unlike Boaty – being chosen as the official name; in other cases organisations have chosen a similar name in tribute, without a poll. Many, but not all, follow the formula of Namey McNameface.

== Examples ==
A wide range of companies or organisations have renamed or tried to rename items in their business. This includes:

- An aeroplane: The Irish airline Aer Lingus named one of their aircraft "Planey McPlaneface" in 2016.
- A beer: The British television presenter and farmer Jeremy Clarkson revealed in 2021 he planned to call a beer made from ingredients grown on his Diddly Squat Farm as "Lager McLagerface" (which would then be shortened to "McFace"). This was rejected by the advertising executive who said it did not give a premium image so the beer was named Hawkstone Lager instead.
- A bookmobile: The mobile library for Orkney Library and Archive is called "Booky McBookface". It is a bright blue bus which is ferried from island to island to bring books to rural and remote areas.
- A fish statue: "Fishy McFishface", a largemouth bass fish statue, is a mascot and tourist attraction for the Hixton Travel Plaza and Timber Valley Restaurant in Hixton, Wisconsin, USA. The fibreglass statue is approximately 3.8 metres (15 feet) long, 1.5 metres (6 feet) wide, and 2 metres (8 feet) high.
- A chain ferry: In March 2017, the Isle of Wight Council, which operates the Cowes Floating Bridge (a chain ferry across the River Medina between Cowes and East Cowes), stated it was open to suggestions from residents for a new name for the vessel, after originally registering it as Floating Bridge no. 6. Despite council officials ruling out Floaty McFloatface as a name, a petition was later created to name the vessel Floaty McFloatface, attracting over 2,000 signatures, and even caused the council to rescind its decision to veto the name.
- A ferry: Sydney Ferries allowed the public to name its fleet of Emerald-class ferries through a naming competition. It was announced that the most popular name was Boaty McBoatface but, as it had already been taken, the judges opted to go instead for the second-place choice, and one of the ferries was thus named Ferry McFerryface. After the Maritime Union of Australia refused to crew the vessel in protest at the name, it entered service named Emerald 6, with a Ferry McFerryface sticker below the bridge. In January 2018, an FOI request revealed Ian Kiernan had in fact received over 2,000 votes compared to 182 for Ferry McFerryface, with the latter chosen by Transport Minister Andrew Constance, who claimed it had always been intended as a short-term publicity stunt. Conforming to the previous practice of naming ferries after local notables, Emerald 6 was renamed after May Gibbs.
- A howitzer: Center of Assistance to the Army, Veterans and Their Families, an NGO in Ukraine, held a Twitter voting contest to name an M777 howitzer on the 18th of August of 2022. At the time of the contest, the howitzer was in use by the Armed Forces of Ukraine during the 2022 Russian invasion of Ukraine. The name was inscribed on the gun barrel. The winning name chosen was Cannon McCannonface.
- A language parser: In 2016, Google released SyntaxNet, a neural network framework. The English-language parser is called Parsey McParseface.
- A marble: Jelle's Marble Runs, a YouTube channel centered on marble racing, launched their Sand Marble Rally series in June 2016. One of the marble competitors was named Marbly McMarbleface.
- A market tent: In 2024, the city of Harrisburg, Pennsylvania, held a fundraising contest to name a temporary tent erected to house vendors displaced by a fire which partially destroyed the historic Broad Street Market earlier that year. The winning name was Tenty McTentface.
- A megabus: Megabus' United Kingdom operation hosted a Twitter poll in late 2017 to name some of their brand-new Plaxton Elite bodied Volvo B11RT inter-deck coaches. Mega McMegaface won, and the name was applied to one of the vehicles.
- An overpass: In 2017, the city of Murfreesboro, Tennessee, replaced the intersection of State Route 1 and State Route 10 with an overpass. Locals were allowed to vote for the bridge's name in an online poll. The most popular name for the bridge was "Bridgey McBridgeface." The bridge was officially designated as Bridgey McBridgeface for a single day on April 1, 2018. The bridge was then renamed the Blue Raider Bridge, after the athletic teams of Middle Tennessee State University.

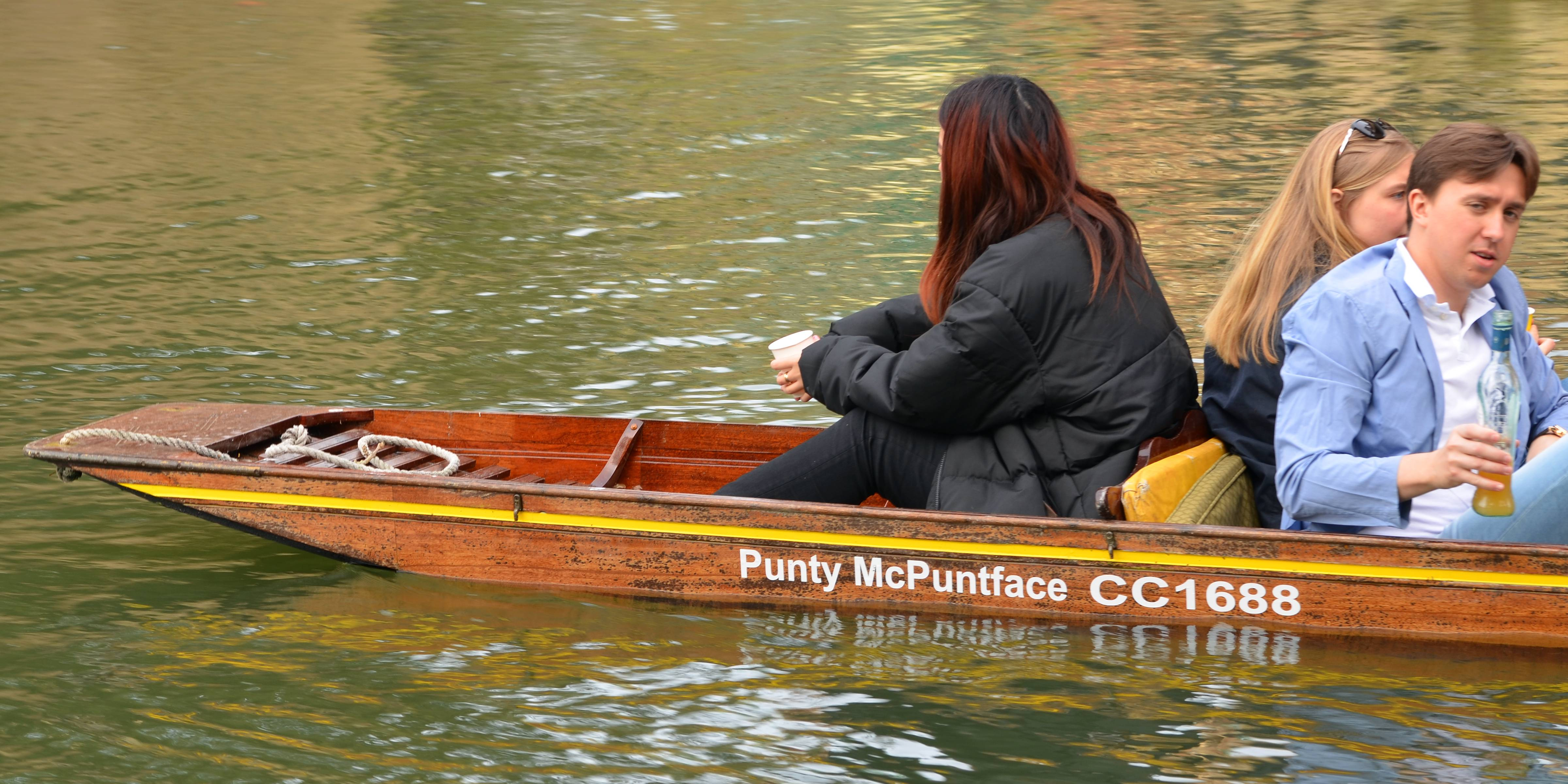
A Cambridge punt (belonging to Clare College) named Punty McPuntface

- A punt: Clare College, Cambridge has a punt named Punty McPuntface.
- A racehorse: Sydney's Warwick Farm Racecourse named their new racehorse Horsey McHorseface in 2016. Horsey McHorseface was put to auction and sold for $17,325, but in 2017 was euthanised due to bone disease.
- A satellite terminal: The U.S. space launch provider and satellite operator firm SpaceX has named the terminal used to receive internet signals from its Starlink constellation of low-Earth orbiting satellites Dishy McFlatface.
- A skate park: In June 2019, Southend-on-Sea Borough Council named a skate park Skatey McSkateface after a public vote.
- A sluice gate: In November 2020, the Dutch municipality of IJmuiden refused to name the new sluice lock Sluice McSluiceface or Sluisje McSluisface in Dutch. The name eventually chosen was Zeesluis IJmuiden (Sea Sluice IJmuiden).
- A snow plow: In 2019, an online poll via Twitter and email was held to determine the name of the newest snowplow for the Washington state DOT fleet. Plowie McPlow Plow was overwhelmingly chosen. The tow plow lives in west Spokane and covers a portion of I-90. Its fellow plows at the time were named The Big Leplowski (a pun on the title of the film The Big Lebowski) and Sir Plows-a-lot (a pun on rapper Sir Mix-a-Lot).
- Another snow plow: In February 2021, the Minnesota Department of Transportation arranged a contest to name a new fleet of snowplows. Out of the fifty finalists selected from about 24,000 entries, Plowy McPlowface was the top of the eight winners of a public poll, receiving support of over half of the voting pool, and was assigned to the Metro District's new snowplow.
- Yet another snow plow: Arlington County, Virginia is famous for their use of puns for their fleet of snow plows. Some of the various names used include The Life of a Snow Girl, Plow I Met Your Mother, and Salty McSaltface.
- A stock car race: Busch Beer, a brand of Anheuser-Busch, held a contest to name one of the two races it sponsored for the 2021 NASCAR Cup Series, held at Kansas Speedway on May 2. The winning name chosen was 2021 Buschy McBusch Race 400. The race was coincidentally won by Kyle Busch, who is not related to the family for whom the beer brand is named.
- A gritter lorry: In October 2018, Shropshire Council followed the similar theme, and named one of its gritter lorries Gritty McGritface after a public vote.
- Another gritter lorry: Cornwall Council in England ran a poll in 2025 to name their new fleet of 25 gritter lorries. All suggestions had to be themed around Cornwall. A winner was Salty McSaltash, referencing the McFace format and the South East Cornwall town of Saltash.
- A train: Swedish rail transport company MTRX conducted an online poll soon after the one involving Boaty McBoatface, to name a new train on the Stockholm to Gothenburg line. Trainy McTrainface won the poll with 49% of the vote, and the train was named accordingly. In 2024 MTRX was sold and renamed to VR. It kept most train names including this one.
- A street sweeper: In 2023, Pensacola, Florida, announced the city was buying 4 new street sweepers and opened up a contest to the public to help name them. Along with names like Obi-Wan Cleanobi and Lightning McClean, the runaway winner was Sweepy McSweepface.

== Similar polls ==
In December 2016, after an online poll for children, Oldham Council chose to name one of their new gritter lorries (salt truck) Nicole Saltslinger following more than 5,000 entries. In November 2017, following public submissions, Doncaster Council announced the names for two new additional gritter lorries to their fleet; namely Gritsy Bitsy Teeny Weeny Yellow Anti-Slip Machiney (with 52.6% of the vote), and David Plowie (47.4% of the vote). This follows its five previously named gritters: Brad Grit, Gritney Spears, The Subzero Hero, Mr. Plow, and Usain Salt. Many other local authorities in the United Kingdom have also asked the public for name suggestions for their winter maintenance fleet, as has the Minnesota Department of Transportation every year since 2021.

In 2011, the German city of Schwäbisch-Gmünd polled to name a new street tunnel, and after a Bud Spencer fan group on Facebook took note, the name suggestion "Bud Spencer Tunnel" won by far. After the city refused to assign that name, as a compromise the public swimming pool was renamed to "Bud Spencer Bad" (German for Bud Spencer Bath). The humour of this name is derived from the German "Bad" being pronounced the same way as the English "Bud".
