= ForoCoches =

Spanish Internet forum

ForoCoches (literally "CarsForum") is a Spanish Internet forum established in 2003. Founded for discussion about cars and other transport, the site has since been noted for online trolling campaigns. As of May 2018, the forum had around 700,000 registered accounts. Belonging to the Spanish manosphere, it is conspicuous for its misogynistic content.

== Notable events ==
In 2009, a campaign by ForoCoches resulted in FHM magazine naming Curri Valenzuela – who was then aged over 60 – as the sexiest journalist.

ForoCoches ran a campaign for John Cobra to be selected to represent Spain in the Eurovision Song Contest 2010. In the second round, broadcast live on Televisión Española, he praised the forum while insulting and gesturing at the crowd. Site creator Alejandro Marín reflected "We have trolled a pathetic programme, full of fakes and of piss-poor musical quality, paid for by the public". The channel's president, Alberto Oliart, apologised in the Senate of Spain and said that measures would be made to stop abuses of the voting system.

ForoCoches ran a hoax story in August 2010 that an imaginary 18-year-old footballer named Néstor Coratella had transferred from Uruguay's Danubio F.C. to Spain's Villarreal CF. A fake Facebook profile, fake Danubio academy website and a photoshopped page from the Uruguayan newspaper Observa led to several Spanish media outlets believing the story.

In March 2016, ForoCoches campaigned on the British Royal Navy's "name our ship" proposal, requesting that the ship be named after Blas de Lezo – a Spanish admiral who defeated the British at the Battle of Cartagena de Indias in 1741. The option with over 30,000 votes was removed, and the ship was named the RRS Sir David Attenborough.

In May 2018, some users of the forum illegally published photographs and personal information of the victim of the La Manada rape case. Marín banned 200 users and removed the illegal posts from public view, saying that he would cooperate if contacted by the police. Several companies, including Mapfre, removed their advertisements from the website after a boycott.

== Content ==
Some of ForoCoches's users use rhetoric associated with the alt-right and the Manosphere. These include terms familiar to English-speaking sympathisers to those movements, including Chad – a confident alpha male – and original terms such as Charo – a middle-aged, dyed-hair, radical feminist.
