= Boaty McBoatface =

British autonomous underwater vehicle

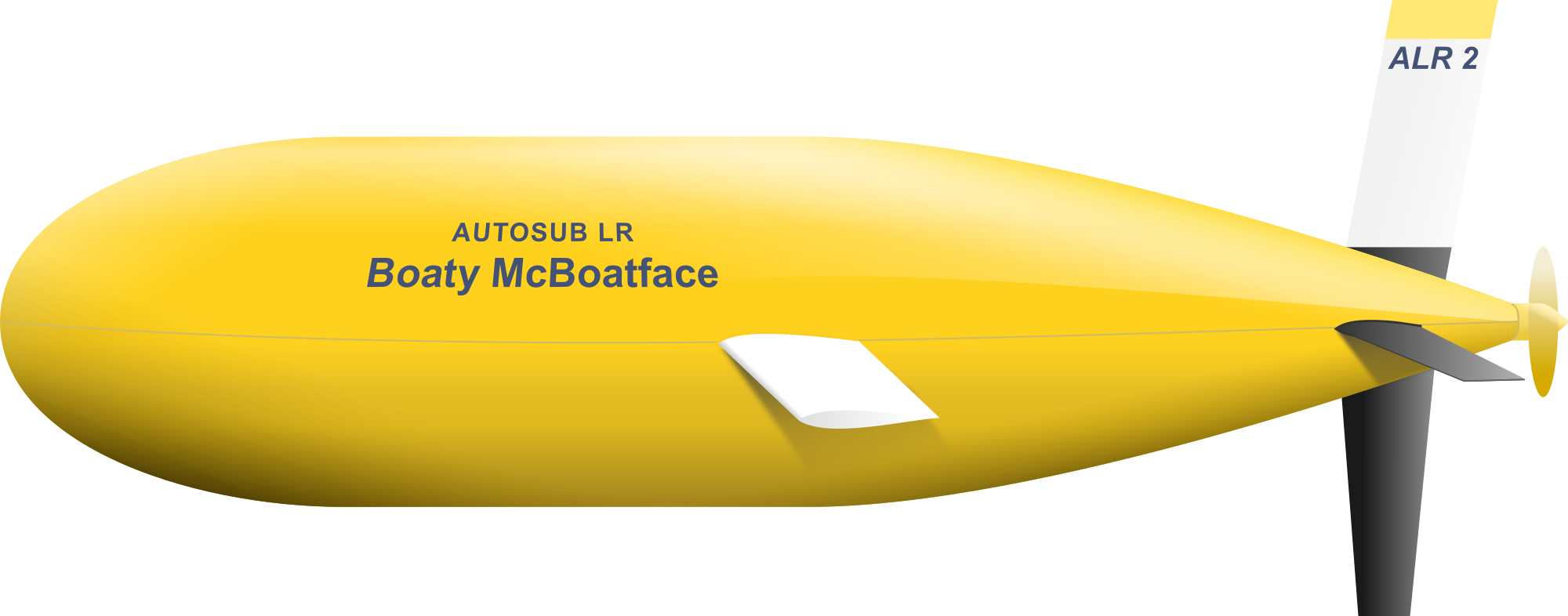
- Drawing of Boaty McBoatface

History
- Name: Boaty McBoatface
- Owner: National Oceanography Centre (NOC), Southampton, England, UK; part of the UK National Marine Equipment PooI (NMEP)
- Operator: National Oceanography Centre
- Launched: 2017
- Commissioned: 2016
- Maiden voyage: 3 April 2017; 9 years ago
- In service: 2018; 8 years ago
- Status: Active; focal point of the Polar Explorer Programme of the British government
- Notes: Carried onboard the polar scientific research ship RRS Sir David Attenborough

General characteristics
- Class & type: Autosub Long Range (ALR)
- Type: Long-range autonomous underwater vehicle (AUV)
- Displacement: 700 kilograms (1,543 pounds)
- Length: 3.62 metres (11 feet 10.5 inches)
- Installed power: Lithium battery power
- Propulsion: Electric motor-powered propeller
- Speed: 0.5 to 1.0 metre per second (1.6 to 3.3 feet per second)
- Range: at least 2,500 kilometres (1,550 miles)
- Endurance: "several months"
- Test depth: 6,000 metres (19,690 feet)
- Complement: 0 – totally autonomous, pre-programmed before each mission launch
- Sensors & processing systems: Sonar, temperature, salinity, density, audio

Boaty McBoatface (informally known as Boaty) is part of a fleet of six "over-the-horizon" autonomous underwater vehicles (AUVs) of the Autosub Long Range (ALR) class. Launched in 2017, the ALRs are designed, owned and operated by the National Oceanography Centre in the UK. One of the many features of ALRs is a shore-launch capability.

Boaty and her fleet-mates are part of the UK National Marine Equipment Pool operated and maintained by the National Oceanography Centre in Southampton. The ALRs can contain or carry a wide range of oceanographic instruments and sensors to gather data to help understand ocean current and activity, and ultimately the Earth's climate.

== Naming ==
The name Boaty McBoatface was proposed in a March 2016 #NameOurShip online poll to name the £200 million polar scientific research ship being constructed in the Cammell Laird shipyard in Birkenhead for the United Kingdom's Natural Environment Research Council (NERC). BBC Radio Jersey presenter James Hand coined the suggestion Boaty McBoatface for the poll, and the name quickly became the most popular choice by far, with 33% of the vote to 11% for the second choice. The name was described as a homage to Hooty McOwlface, an owl named through an "Adopt-a-Bird" programme in 2012 that became popular on the Internet.

Although Boaty McBoatface was the most popular suggestion in the #NameOurShip poll, the suggestion to use the name for the mothership was not followed. In October 2016, Jo Johnson, Minister for Universities and Science, announced that the ship would be named Sir David Attenborough, after the eminent English zoologist and broadcaster, whose name came fifth in the poll. The name Boaty McBoatface, despite receiving more than ten times the number of votes of Sir David Attenborough, was assigned to one of the submersibles deployed aboard the RRS Sir David Attenborough instead. Describing it as an "eloquent compromise", Duncan Wingham told the Commons Science and Technology Committee, "The controversy over the naming of a new polar research vessel was an 'astoundingly good outcome for public interest in science'", and "the row had 'put a smile' on people's faces" after attracting huge public interest.

Observers of contemporary culture coined the term "McBoatfacing", defined as "making the critical mistake of letting the internet decide things". In one such observation, Jennifer Finney Boylan of The New York Times wrote that to be "McBoatfaced" was to allow people to "deliberately make their choices not in order to foster the greatest societal good, but, instead, to mess with you". The results of the poll inspired numerous similar spoofs in other naming polls.

== Service ==
Boaty underwent advanced sea trials in 2016.

=== Missions ===
Her maiden voyage proper started on 3 April 2017, with the Dynamics of the Orkney Passage Outflow (DynOPO) expedition on board research ship RRS James Clark Ross of the British Antarctic Survey (BAS), to research how Antarctic Bottom Water leaves the Weddell Sea and enters the Southern Ocean through a 3.5 kilometres (11,000 feet) deep region known as the Orkney Passage, south of Chile.

During this expedition, which was part of a primary project with the University of Southampton, the National Oceanography Centre (NOC), and the British Antarctic Survey (BAS), along with additional support from the Woods Hole Oceanographic Institution (WHOI) and Princeton University, she traveled 180 kilometres (97 nautical miles; 110 miles) at depths of up to 4,000 metres (13,000 feet), and collected data on water temperature, salinity, and turbulence. Combined with measurements collected by RRS James Clark Ross, the data suggest that as winds over the Southern Ocean have strengthened, driven by the hole in the ozone layer above Antarctica, and increases in greenhouse gases, they have increased the turbulence of deep ocean waters, leading to increased mixing of cold and warm water.

According to National Oceanography Centre oceanographer Dr. Eleanor Frajka-Williams, "This was [a] unique new process that rapidly exchanges water between the cold and the warm and then spreads the effect of the different water properties over a larger area", more efficiently than the better-known processes that mix warm surface waters with cold water from the deep sea. This action rapidly warms the cold water, which contributes to rising sea levels, as water becomes less dense as it warms.

This newly discovered action has not yet been included in models for predicting sea level rise and the effect of climate change on the ocean. The results were published in the Proceedings of the National Academy of Sciences.

A subsequent voyage for Boaty in 2017 was in the North Sea. Fitted with new chemical and acoustic sensors, these will enable Boaty to seek, or 'sniff out' traces indicating the artificial release of gas from beneath the seabed. This will be part of a world first 'real world' controlled experiment in deep-water, in order to simulate any potential release of gas that may be indicative of leakage from a carbon capture and storage reservoir; and will be led by the NOC.

As part of the Polar Explorer Programme, data from Boaty and the RRS Sir David Attenborough was used in an online educational resource package. Videos and images were provided to primary and secondary school teachers in the UK to enrich STEM learning, and also to the public.

On 28 December 2017, "Boaty" was featured as a "Jeopardy!" category.

During January and February 2018, Boaty completed her first mission under-ice. She was deployed in the southern section of the Weddell Sea, spending a total of 51 hours under the Antarctic ice. Part of the Filchner Ice Shelf System Project, she travelled a total of 108 kilometres (58 nautical miles; 67 miles) and reached water depths of 944 metres (3,097 feet) during the mission. Boaty spent 20 hours underneath a 550 metres (1,800 feet) thick section of ice shelf.

In August 2024, she completed a 2,000 kilometres (1,100 nautical miles; 1,200 miles) voyage from Iceland to Scotland, taking 55 days. She was being used in a research project to investigate the carbon pump effect.

== See also ==
- List of Mcface spoofs
