= RRS Sir David Attenborough =

Royal Research Ship operated by the British Antarctic Survey

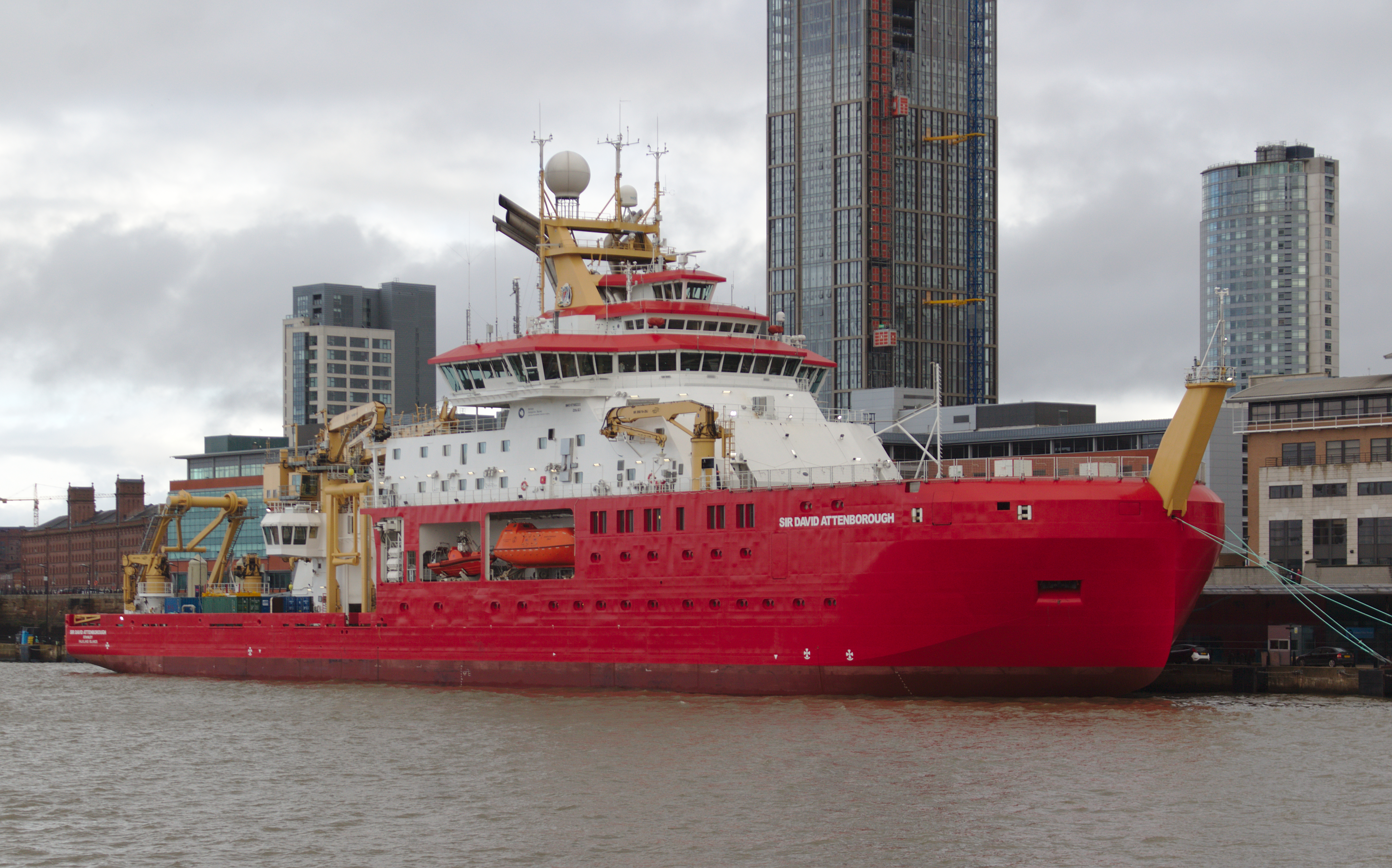
- RRS Sir David Attenborough berthed in Liverpool, England

History

Falkland Islands
- Name: RRS Sir David Attenborough
- Namesake: Sir David Attenborough
- Owner: NERC Research Ship Unit
- Operator: British Antarctic Survey
- Port of registry: Stanley, Falkland Islands
- Builder: Cammell Laird
- Cost: £200 million (2014) (equivalent to £268 million in 2024)
- Yard number: 1390
- Laid down: 17 October 2016
- Launched: 14 July 2018
- Sponsored by: Catherine, Princess of Wales
- Christened: 26 September 2019
- Completed: 2 December 2020
- Identification: IMO number: 9798222; MMSI number: 740405000; Call sign: ZDLQ3
- Status: In service

General characteristics
- Tonnage: 15,000 GT; 4,475 DWT
- Length: 128.9 m (423 ft)
- Beam: 24 m (79 ft)
- Draught: 7 m (23 ft)
- Depth: 11 m (36 ft)
- Ice class: Polar Class 4 (hull); Polar Class 5 (propulsion system)
- Installed power: 2 × Bergen B33:45L6A (2 × 3,600 kW); 2 × Bergen B33:45L9A (2 × 5,400 kW)
- Propulsion: Diesel-electric; two shafts; 2 × 2,750 kW per shaft; Two 5-bladed controllable pitch propellers
- Speed: 17.5 knots (32.4 km/h; 20.1 mph) (maximum); 13 knots (24 km/h; 15 mph) (cruising); 3 knots (5.6 km/h; 3.5 mph) in 1 m (3 ft) ice
- Range: 19,000 nautical miles (35,000 km; 22,000 mi) at 13 knots
- Endurance: 60 days
- Crew: 28 crew; 60 scientists; 2 spare berths
- Aircraft carried: Facilities for 2 helicopters

RRS Sir David Attenborough is a research vessel owned by the Natural Environment Research Council and operated by the British Antarctic Survey for the purposes of both research and logistic support. The ship replaces a pair of existing vessels, RRS James Clark Ross and RRS Ernest Shackleton. The vessel is named after the famous British broadcaster and naturalist David Attenborough.

== Background ==
In 2014, the UK Government announced funding for the construction of a new polar research vessel for the British Antarctic Survey (BAS) to replace a pair of existing ships. This new ship was intended not only to be fully equipped with the latest instrumentation for the purposes of carrying out research in polar regions, for which it would have an improved icebreaking capability and greater endurance over the existing polar research vessel, but also to serve as a logistic support vessel for BAS teams in inshore locations.

BAS contracted Houlder to undertake the basic design in which suggestions for the final configuration of the new ship were taken. Following the consultation period, in 2015, Rolls-Royce Holdings was selected to execute the detailed design and Cammell Laird in Birkenhead was selected as the preferred bidder to construct the ship. The ship cost £200m.

== General characteristics ==
The ship is about 125 metres (410 ft) long, with a beam of about 24 metres (79 ft). The draught is about 7 metres (23 ft) with a planned cruising speed of 13 knots (24 km/h; 15 mph) with a range of 19,000 nautical miles (35,000 km; 22,000 mi) at that speed. She is capable of carrying two helicopters and has a capacity for approximately 900 cubic metres (32,000 cu ft) of cargo. Accommodation is provided for 30 crew and 60 research staff.

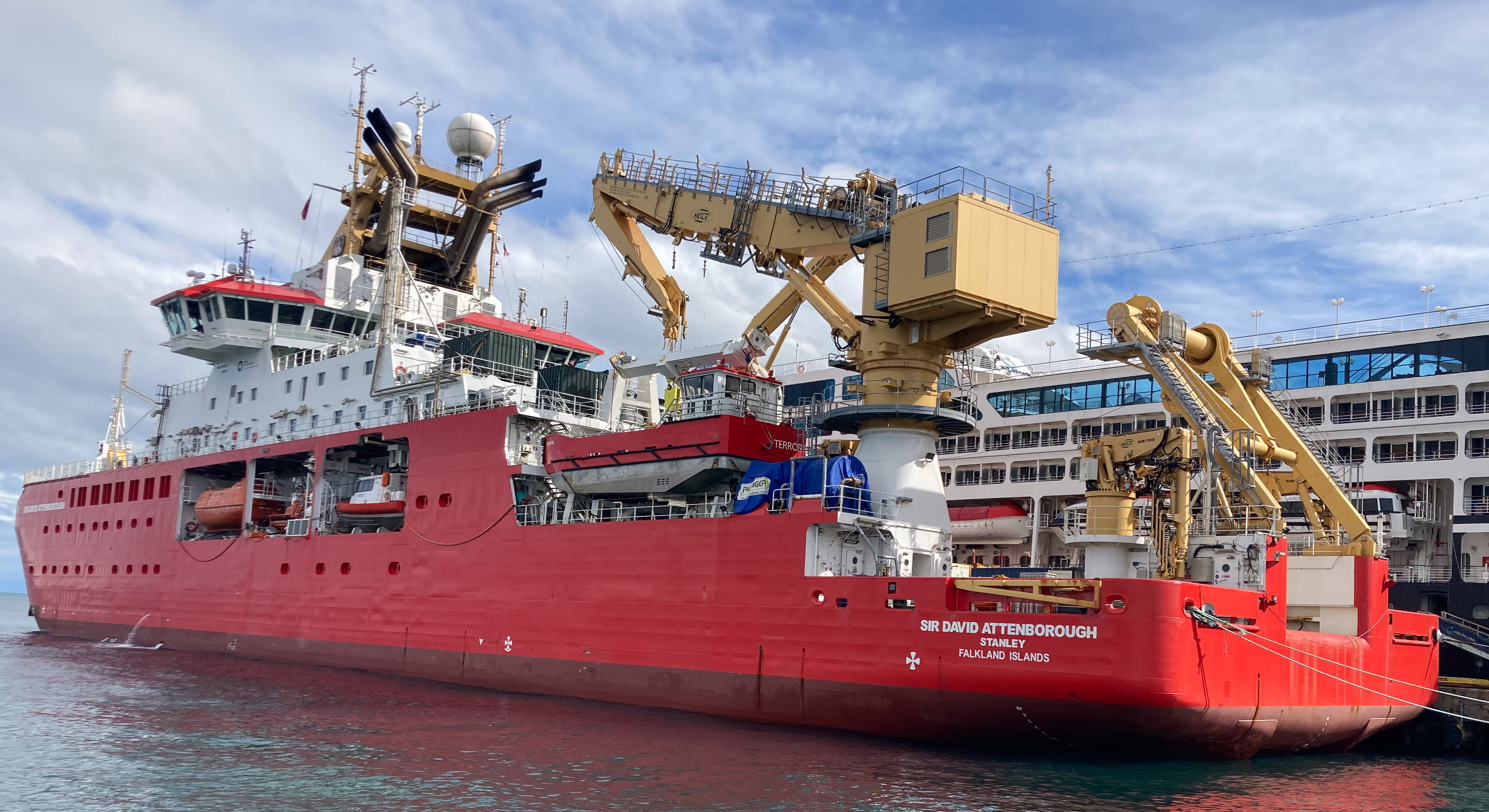
Sir David Attenborough in 2024

Sir David Attenborough has a twin-shaft hybrid diesel-electric propulsion system. The vessel's power plant consists of two 3,600 kW (4,800 hp) 6-cylinder Bergen B33:45L6A and two 5,400 kW (7,200 hp) 9-cylinder Bergen B33:45L9A main diesel generators, a Cummins KTA38-DM1 885 kW (1,187 hp) harbour generator, and two 2,500 kW (3,400 hp) battery systems each of 500 kWh (1,800 MJ) capacity. The power plant, which can run with different configurations depending on the mission and operating conditions, produces electricity to power four 2,750 kW (3,690 hp) asynchronous electric motors driving two 5-bladed controllable pitch propellers. This gives Sir David Attenborough a maximum speed of 17.5 knots (32.4 km/h; 20.1 mph) in open water and ability to break up to 1-metre (3.3 ft) thick level ice at a speed of 3 knots (5.6 km/h; 3.5 mph). At an economical cruising speed of 13 knots (24 km/h; 15 mph), she has an operating range of 19,000 nautical miles (35,000 km; 22,000 mi). For manoeuvring and dynamic positioning, the vessel has four 1,580 kW (2,120 hp) Tees White Gill thrusters with Teignbridge Propellers 60 inch 4 blade rotors, two in the bow and two in the stern.

The vessel has been strengthened according to the International Association of Classification Societies (IACS) Unified Requirements for Polar Class Ships. Her ice class, Polar Class 4, is intended for year-round operation in thick first-year ice which may include old ice inclusions. However, her propulsion system is only rated for Polar Class 5 which is intended for medium first-year ice.

In 2024, a corner of the ship's IT office was turned into a dedicated "pets' corner" for scientists to put pictures of their pets. This had the effect of boosting the morale of those on board.

== Construction ==
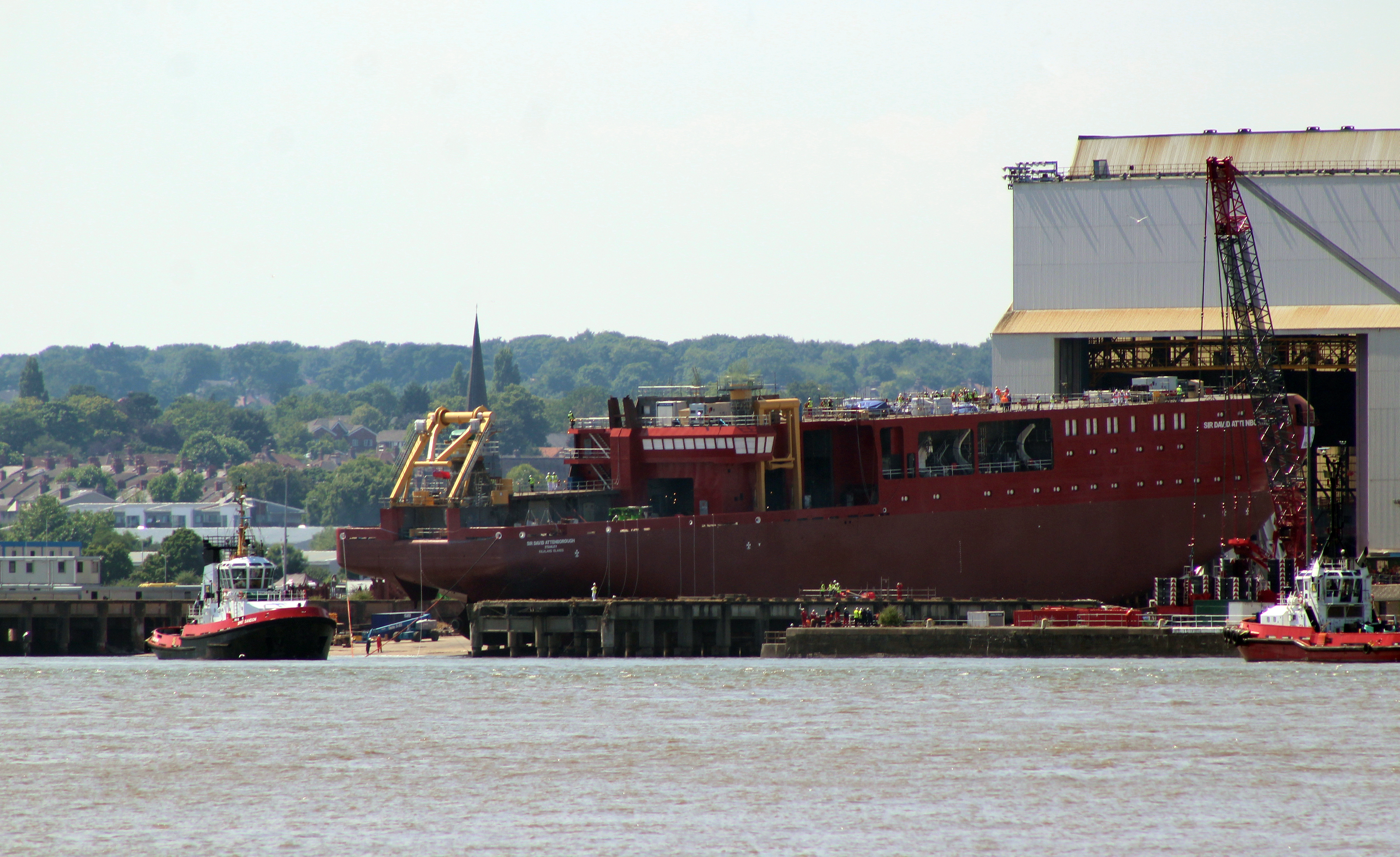
The hull of RRS Sir David Attenborough just before her launch

The first steel for the construction of the ship was cut in July 2016. The keel-laying ceremony for the ship, yard number 1390, took place on 17 October 2016.

The ship was constructed by combining individually fabricated blocks, much like the Queen Elizabeth-class aircraft carriers. The majority of the blocks were manufactured by Cammell Laird at Birkenhead, but due to a tight schedule, the stern of the ship (named 'Block 10') was fabricated by the A&P Group at Hebburn on the River Tyne. The section was transported to Merseyside on a barge in August 2017. The stern section was loaded onto the barge by heavy lifting company ALE, using self-propelled modular trailers (SPMT). The same procedure in reverse was then used to get the hull segment on to the slipway at Birkenhead. The hull of Sir David Attenborough was named by her namesake and launched on 14 July 2018. She was moved into a wet dock for the addition of her superstructure and fitting out. The ship was originally scheduled to be completed by October 2018. The official naming ceremony took place on 26 September 2019. A bottle of champagne was smashed across the ship's bow by Catherine, Duchess of Cambridge, at Cammell Laird's shipyard in Birkenhead. Sir David Attenborough was present at the ceremony. Poet Laureate Simon Armitage wrote a poem "Ark" to celebrate the naming ceremony. Attenborough was also present at commissioning, stating "This astonishing ship... will find the science with which to deal with the problems that are facing the world today and will increasingly do so tomorrow."

== Service ==
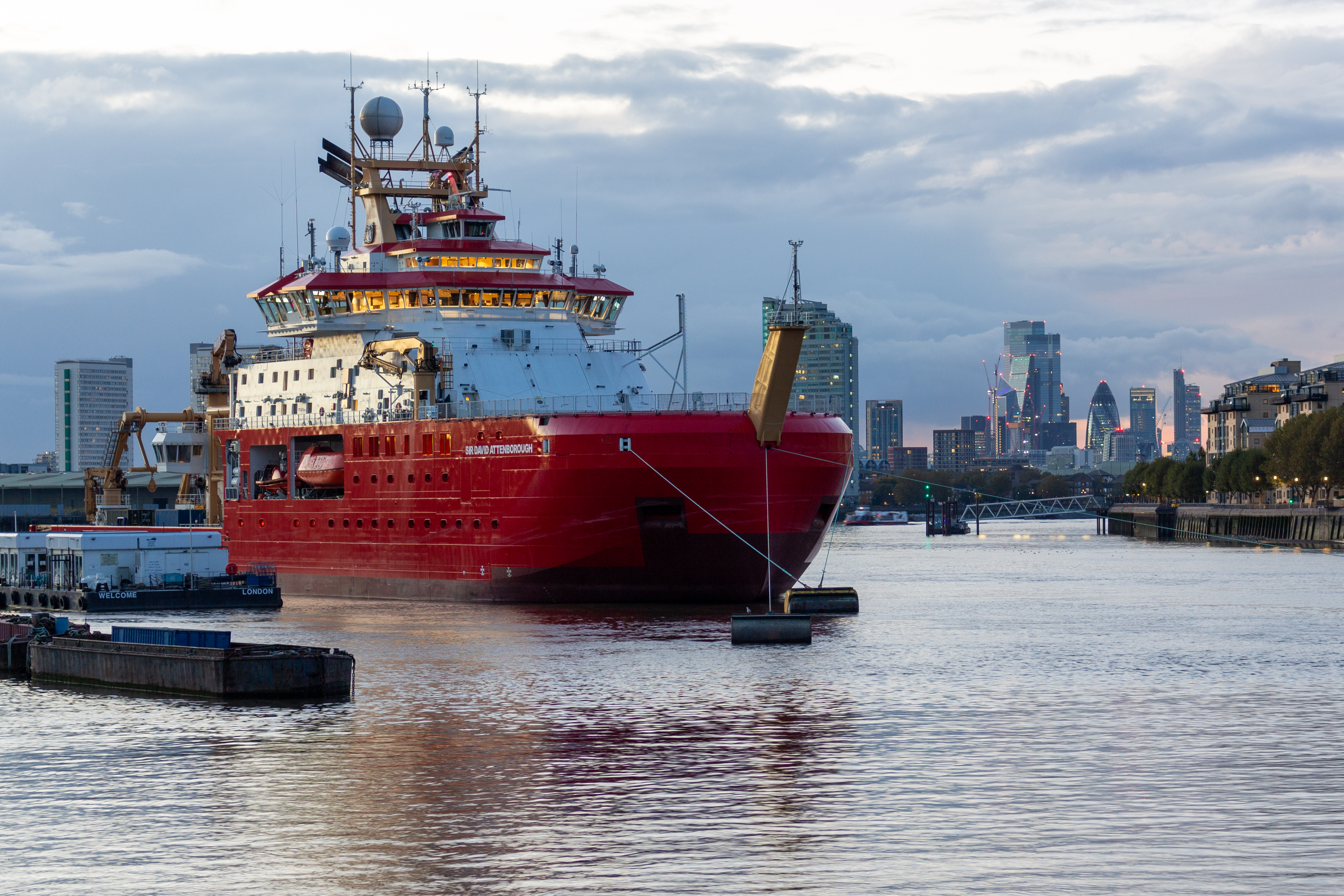
RRS Sir David Attenborough on the River Thames in Greenwich, London, in October 2021

Sir David Attenborough was originally planned to enter service in late 2020, but in January 2020 Sky News reported that her delivery was at risk of delay, and that BAS planned to keep James Clark Ross in service for another year past her intended retirement. In August, Sir David Attenborough made a brief trip to the Liverpool Cruise Terminal before returning to Cammell Laird for final fitting out ahead of sea trials scheduled for late in the year. Sir David Attenborough began her sea trials on 21 October 2020. On 5 March 2021, an accident during a launching drill of a lifeboat resulted in injuries to a crew member. She made her maiden voyage to Antarctica on 16 November 2021, from Harwich and arrived at the Rothera Research Station on 17 December 2021 for the first time.

In February 2022, RRS Sir David Attenborough encountered second-year ice with thick snow layer on top that she could not overcome on her own while the vessel was attempting to reach Stange Sound in the English Coast in Antarctica. The vessel then collaborated with the French icebreaking cruise ship operated by Compagnie du Ponant, Le Commandant Charcot, which opened a channel for the research vessel. However, as the ice conditions became even more unfavourable, RRS Sir David Attenborough had to give up the original plan and seek another drop-off point to deliver scientific cargo to support the International Thwaites Glacier Collaboration.

In early 2023, Sir David Attenborough was accused by Argentine authorities as having transited illegally through Argentine national waters to the port of Punta Arenas in Chile. Argentina specifically objected to the ship's use of facilities in the Falkland Islands prior to her arrival in Chile, utilization which Argentina argued violated its national laws but which Britain did not recognize as valid.

== Naming poll ==
NERC Name Our Ship campaign, 2016
- March–April 2016
- Website: nameourship.nerc.ac.uk

Results
| Boaty McBoatface | 33.16% |
| Poppy-Mai | 10.66% |
| Henry Worsley | 4.21% |
| David Attenborough | 2.95% |
| It's Bloody Cold Here | 2.85% |
- Shows top five suggestions out of 7,034

In March 2016, the Natural Environment Research Council (NERC) invited members of the public to suggest names for the ship. Names previously used would not be eligible, but otherwise it was open to suggestions. The NERC stated that they would have the final say, and that the most popular name in the poll would not necessarily be the one used.

Former BBC Radio Jersey presenter James Hand jokingly suggested RRS "Boaty McBoatface". This quickly became the most popular choice and was the runaway winner when the poll closed, with 124,109 votes. The name has been described as a homage to "Hooty McOwlface", an owl named through an "Adopt-A-Bird" programme in 2012 that became popular on the internet.

On 6 May 2016, science minister Jo Johnson announced that the choice had been made to name the ship after naturalist Sir David Attenborough, but that Boaty McBoatface would be the name of one of David Attenborough's remotely controlled submersibles.

A petition calling for Attenborough himself to change his name to Sir Boaty McBoatface "in the interest of democracy and humour" soon received more than 3,800 signatures.

In response to the poll, the Science and Technology Committee, a select committee of the House of Lords, announced that they were to review the process by which the ship was named. NERC chief executive Duncan Wingham and NERC head of communications Julia Maddock faced the committee on 10 May. James Wilsdon, an outreach director at Sheffield University, told MPs that he voted for Boaty McBoatface. Despite the controversy, NERC directors felt that their poll was a successful initiative in that it generated a lot of publicity regarding their organisation and research mission among the lay public.

Other leading choices in the poll were Poppy-Mai, in honour of a toddler with incurable cancer, and Henry Worsley, for a British Army officer who died in 2016 while attempting to complete the first solo and unaided crossing of the Antarctic. Spanish internet users from the forum ForoCoches attempted to hijack the poll by promoting the choice Blas de Lezo, a Spanish Navy officer who won the Battle of Cartagena de Indias against the British in 1741, putting forward his "contribution to British underwater archeology". Many of those supporting the choice made comments which referenced Spanish nationalist issues such as the English defeat of the Spanish Armada and the Gibraltar sovereignty dispute. The choice gained more than 38,000 votes before it was removed, with a NERC spokesperson stating that they would "remove or reject any name suggestion that we deem liable to cause offence".

== See also ==
- List of things named after David Attenborough and his works
- List of Mcface spoofs
