= Féraud =

Féraud or Feraud may refer to:

People

- Féraud de Domene, a bishop in the Roman Catholic Diocese of Gap (1010-1040)
- Féraud de Nice (c. 970 – 1044), Bishop of Gap 1000–1044, cousin of Féraud de Domene
- Féraud (surname)

Places

- Feraud General Merchandise Store, a building built in 1903 in Ventura, California

other

- "Chant Funèbre à la Mémoire de Féraud", a song by Étienne Méhul
