= Trictrac =

Form of backgammon

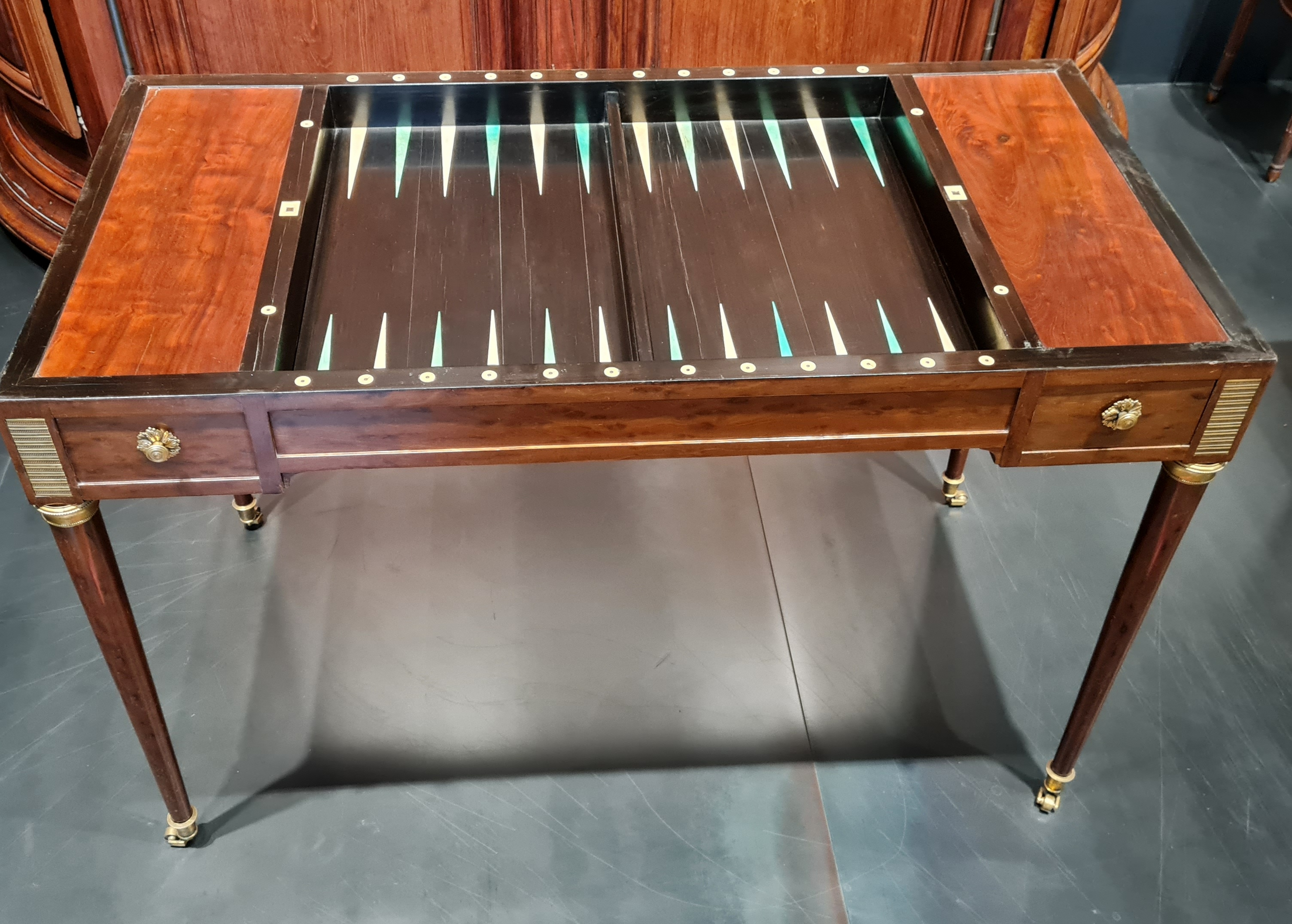
- Publishers: Pierre Guillemot
- Publication: 1634
- Genres: Board game; Dice game; Tables game
- Players: 2 (multiplayer variants exist—unlimited number of players, of which 2 active)
- Movement: contrary
- Playing time: vicar's game: approx. 1 hour; à écrire or combiné: 15 – 45 min./mark (see below)
- Chance: Low to medium (dice rolling)
- Age range: 10+
- Skills: Strategy, tactics, counting, probability
- Related games: Backgammon • Jacquet • English Ticktack

Trictrac (also tric trac or tric-trac) is a French or Austrian board game of skill and chance for two players that is played with dice on a game board similar, but not identical, to that of backgammon (the difference being that the edges of a true trictrac board are perforated for score-marking purposes). Though its national origin is uncertain, it was "the classic tables game" of France in the way that backgammon is in the English-speaking world, and has additionally been known to be played in Austria, Denmark, Spain, and Sweden.

Trictrac's gaming interest lies in its multiple combinations, the importance of decision-making and its comprehensive rules which have been well documented and remained stable since the early 17th century. It requires constant attention from the players whether or not it is their turn. Its vocabulary, which is very rich, frequently occurs in French literature.

The object of the game is not to get out the men as quickly as possible as in jacquet or backgammon, but to score as many points as possible. The game usually ends before all the men have been borne off, and often before any of them have.

From this point onward, in spite of the existence of numerous computer and mobile implementations, trictrac will predominantly be discussed as if it were an over-the-board game; certain social niceties and penalties simply do not make sense when playing on anything but a live board. While these things do need to be mentioned for the sake of those who do wish to play in an analogue environment, in no case does their presence or absence detract from the game itself to any degree.

== Equipment ==
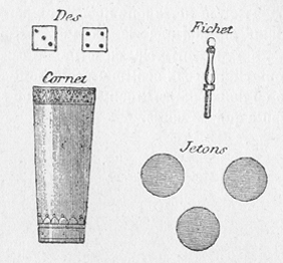
Trictrac equipment, Le Salon des Jeux, p. 146, Emile Guérin editor, n.d. (c. 1900)

The full complement of equipment needed to play all variants of trictrac comprises:

- A board (tablier or trictrac), similar to that of backgammon, but with twenty-four holes drilled in the rails (bandes) forming the longer edges of the board at the base of each of the twenty-four points (flèches = "arrows") and three more holes in each end rail of the board. The players' side rails each have twelve holes, the end rails only three. The centre bar of the board between the left and right halves is also known as the 'bridge' (pont);
- Thirty tablemen (dames = "ladies", tables = "tables", or bois = "wood") of which fifteen are black (noires) and fifteen white (blanches);
- Two dice (dés) and two dice cups (cornets);
- Three identical discs (bredouilles in the plural), called jetons ("tokens") of which one, the "lurch token", is called the bredouille (in the singular);
- Four pairs of pegs (fichets), each pair in a different colour, which progress along the twelve holes of the side rails; of these, one pair should be double-ended. (Gold, silver, black, and gold-silver will be assumed here.)
- Five tokens identical to the jetons but pierced with holes large enough to accommodate the fichets, called, by analogy, neckties (cravates) or ruffs (fraises). A set of five plain washers will suffice.
- A small flag called the banner (étendard) or, literally, pavilion (pavillon).
- Three boxes of European gaming chips, each box containing chips of a different colour, in three denominations each, distinguished by shape: round jetons [jetons], square markers [contrats], and fish-shaped fish [fiches].

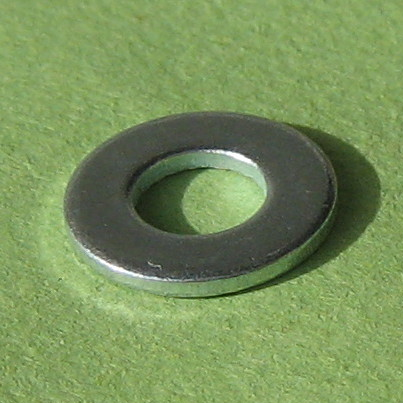
A necktie for use in trictrac. For trictrac combiné, five of these are needed.

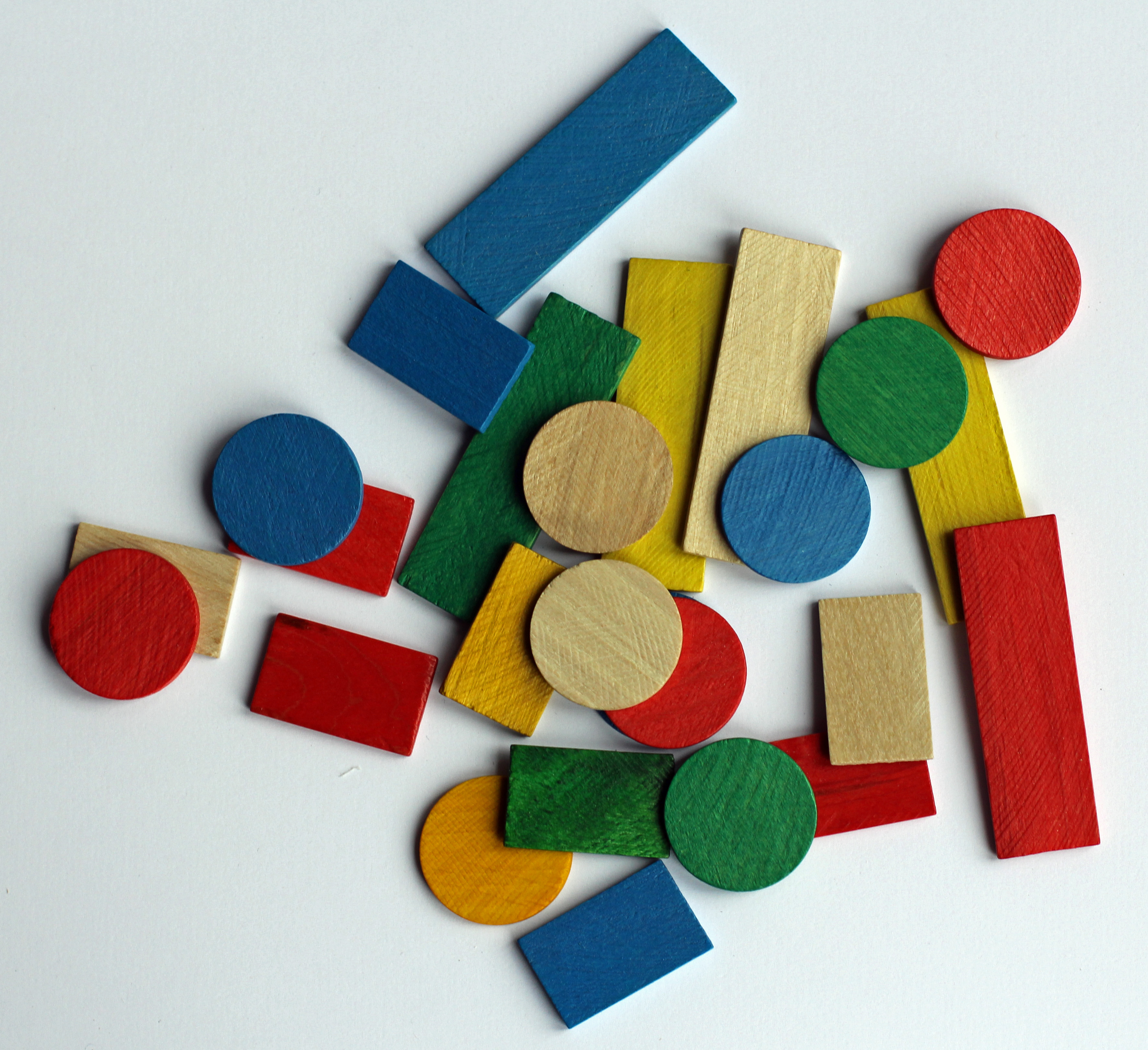
Coloured jetons for playing trictrac à écrire. These are not identical with the three jetons shown above.

This set of equipment represents a ceiling; for the oldest and most basic (à douze trous = "twelve-hole", l'ancien trictrac = "the old trictrac", or jeu de curé = "vicar's game") form of trictrac, some of this is not used (notably, three out of the four pairs of pegs, four out of five neckties, and the gaming chips), and for the later Austrian variation (trictrac à écrire), there is still some unused equipment.

The jetons must not be confused with the score-marking tokens also described above; the French language fails to disambiguate, leaving this to be understood in context. (Oftentimes, such jetons, marked with the logos of breweries and distilleries, are given away in hospitality establishments as promotional ephemera; their nature makes them inherently disposable in stark contrast to the durable gaming material heretofore described.)

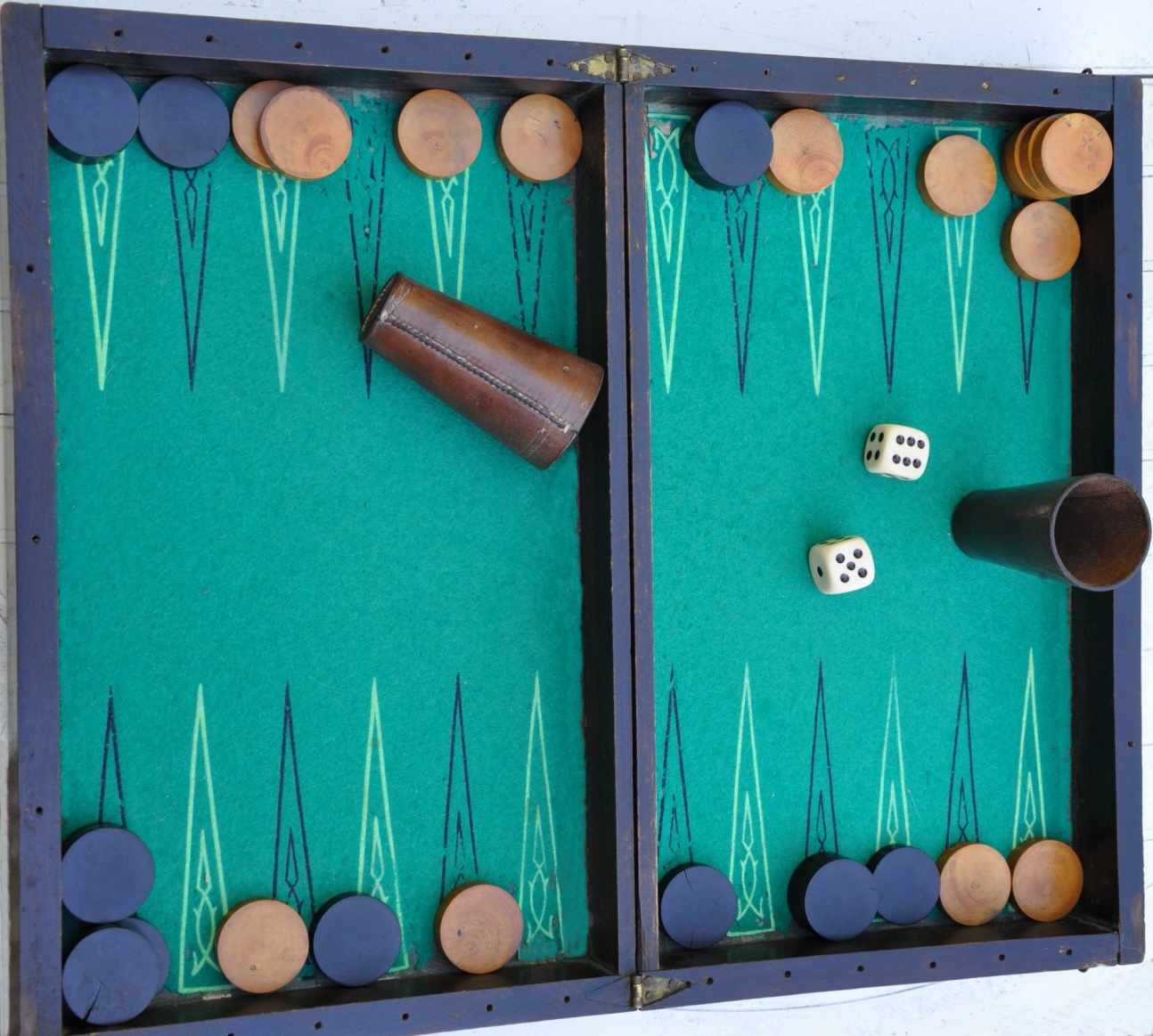
A portable board with the rails properly drilled for trictrac.

Nonetheless, beyond the banner and the double-ended pair of pegs, there is very little in the way of equipment that is unique to trictrac, and improvisation has demonstrably been common practice since the 17th century: it is suggested in a number of the treatises that money (coins) is acceptable for the tokens and neckties,, that a rolled-up scrap of paper or bundle of silk thread makes a decent-enough "peg", and that the board be drilled with twelve holes as seen in the pictures. The pegs are shared with cribbage; the jetons with an assortment of European games (of which noteworthy are Nain Jaune, Belote, Piquet, Ombre, Mistigri, Danish Tarok, Boston and Vira); and the dice, tablemen, and board with all tables games (particularly backgammon).

The word table was the original term used in the French language to designate a man in the game. The name dame became commonplace during the 17th century but that of table remained in several expressions in the game; notably, the expressions jan de deux tables and jan de six tables refer to tablemen, not halves or quadrants of the board (a subtlety sometimes missed by historical translations).

=== The board ===
Tables boards are largely similar, save for a number of minor differences that speak to the games being played thereon. Because, in backgammon, verquere, and bräde (the modern descendant of verquere), pieces hit go to the bar, backgammon and bräde boards both have a deliberately wide bar. Boards for verquere and bräde, however, tend to be in a 2:1 ratio of width to length when open, and thus have extremely short points by comparison with backgammon boards (to the point that, without further inspection, one often can't tell the number of men on a point, only its parity). The more modern style of backgammon board, as popularised in the United States, also tends to come with a so-called doubling cube and have storage for men that have been borne off.

Jacquet (also known as mültezim), plakoto (also known as mahbousa), and fevga (also known as tapa) have no hitting at all, but aside from the case of France during a mid-20th century fad, these games (otherwise popular in Greece, Bulgaria, Lebanon, and Syria) are often played in rotation with backgammon, and are therefore played on backgammon boards. Boards intended only for jacquet (as were made in the tens of thousands during the aforementioned fad) tend to have a far narrower bar than do boards for backgammon and bräde.

A trictrac board is most similar to the jacquet board that it later spawned, but has an approximately 1/8" or 3/16" hole drilled in the top of the side rail at the midpoint of each triangular point for a total of twelve holes per long side, and a further three holes drilled near the centre of each end rail (one a quarter of the way down, one in the middle, and one three-quarters of the way down). This allows the playing of not only trictrac itself, but all the aforementioned games to boot (though some trictrac boards do have very slender centre bars; the bar has a significance in this game, and must be present unlike in some tables games—including jacquet—but it is not a location to which men are ever sent).

In fact, much historical trictrac literature (le Charpentier, Guiton, Lepeintre q.v.) includes sections on how to play these other games and specifically instructs players to play them "sur un trictrac" – that is, on a trictrac board. The complexity of these games relative to one another is laid bare by the fact that 87 pages of the Charpentier (as published in the anthology L'Académie des Jeux) are devoted to trictrac, while verquere (a rather complex tables game in its own right) is given 14. The advice given in the Charpentier still essentially holds: if one wishes to play all tables games, the board that comes second to none in its adaptability is that designed for trictrac.

== Rules ==
=== Preparation ===
The allocation of the men and seating may be by mutual agreement or drawing lots. Once those are decided, the players place their men in three or four piles on their talon on their own side of the board. The player whose talon is to the right moves the men clockwise; the other player moves them anticlockwise. Each player places a peg (fichet) in the hole in the end rail nearest the talon. The banner (étendard) goes in the hole in the middle, between the two pegs. (Note: This hole, as well as that on the other end rail, was used to place a candle holder furnished with a spike for playing in the evening or at night. The flag was in this case placed next to the board.) The three holes in the opposite end rail are not used. The three tokens are lined up against the end rail between the two talons.

==== Vocabulary ====
===== Numbering of points =====
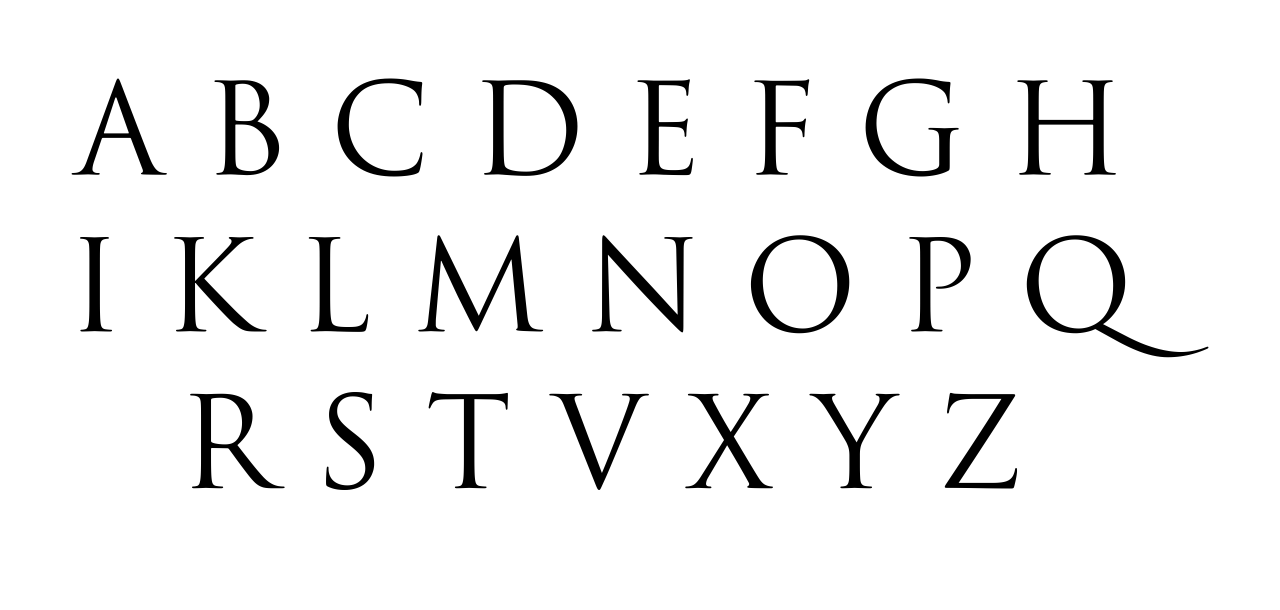
The 23 letters of the Latin alphabet, used by Bernard Soumille for numbering the points of the trictrac board.

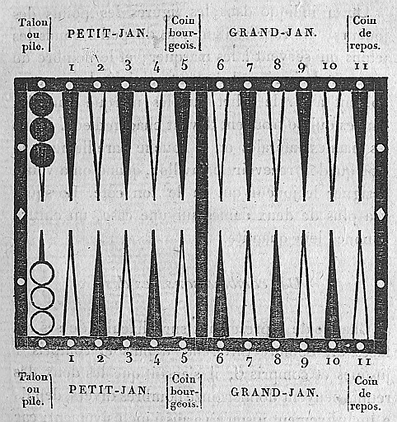
Complete Treatise on the Game of Trictrac by Guiton, 1822, p. 15.

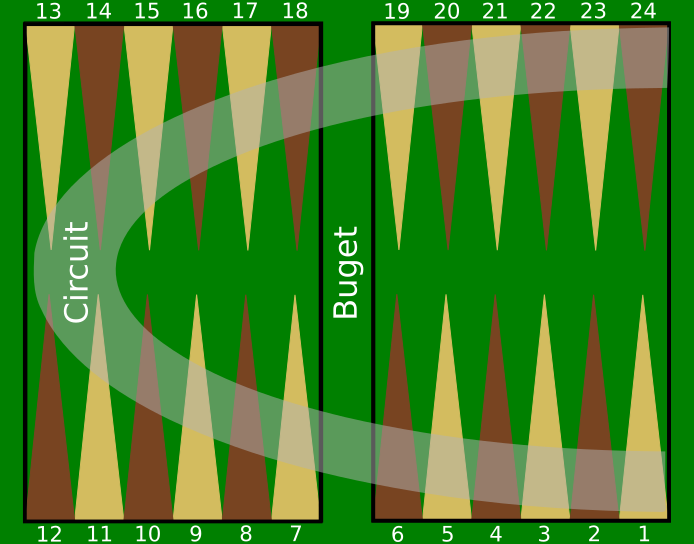
The numbering scheme used by Magriel for backgammon; it is of use in trictrac as well. The players in this game have elected to have the talons on the right.

During the four centuries that trictrac has been known to be played, no system for the numbering of points has become universal. Three numbering conventions are considered particularly noteworthy:

- That used by Charpentier and Guiton, numbering each player's talon where the pieces are arranged at the beginning of each relevé (the space between occurrences of the men being picked up and reset to start—akin to a game in tennis) as T or 0, then 1 to 11;
- That used by Malfilâtre, numbering each player's talon as 1, then 2 to 12;
- That introduced by Magriel, numbering the current player's talon as 1, then 2 to 12, and progressing boustrophedonically down the other side of the board, ending at the opponent's talon, which is numbered 24. See Backgammon notation.

Confusion between the former and the two latter is liable to introduce off-by-one errors; it is therefore crucial to note that this article uses Guiton's numbering. Absolute point names (q.v.) eliminate ambiguity entirely: the coin de repos is always the coin de repos, irrespective of whether it is numbered "Black's 11", "Black's 12", or "the 12-point".

Other notations have been devised by various authors; their use is now to be regarded as obsolete. Lepeintre used a system almost identical to Magriel's, save that points are lettered from A to Y (omitting W) rather than numbered; Soumille used a similar system, but with only the 23 letters of the Latin alphabet (counting I and J, as well as U and V, as one letter each, and omitting W), to which he appended ampersand.

===== Absolute naming of points =====
Certain points have been given names:

- point T: talon (talon);
- point 5: businessman's corner (coin bourgeois, Bürgerwinkel in German);
- point 6: sometimes also called businessman's corner;
- point 7: Devil's corner (coin du Diable);
- point 10: schoolboy's point (case de l'écolier), Travanet's point, or "the Travanet" (sometimes spelled Travanais);
- point 11: rest corner, grand corner, or "the corner" (coin de repos, grand coin, or coin).

Points 9, 10, and 11 are together known as jacket, waistcoat, and trousers (habit, veste, et culotte).

===== Foregame and aftergame =====
The men travel a circuit (marche), first along the player's side of the board from the talon to the rest corner, then along the opponent's, or adverse, side from the adverse rest corner to the adverse talon, before being borne off the board. Each half of the route has a name:

- Foregame (jeu ordinaire): the movement of men along the home side of the board from the talon to the rest corner;
- Aftergame (jeu de retour): the movement of men along the adverse side of the board from the adverse rest corner to the adverse talon. As soon as a player moves a man onto the opponent's half of the board, that man is said to have progressed to the aftergame (passer au retour).

As in backgammon and opposite to jacquet, play is contrariwise.

==== Blots, full points, and vulnerability ====
- To make, bind, or close a point [faire une case], or to cover a blot: to have a minimum of two men on the same point;
- A blot, a singleton, or a half-point [demi-case]: a single man on a point;
- A made, closed, bound, or full point [case]: two or more men sharing the same point;
- A builder [surcase]: any additional man added to a full point. A point can hold up to thirteen builders.
- To expose oneself [s'exposer] or to show oneself [se montrer]: to remove all men save one from a point.

As in backgammon, full points are considered invulnerable and half-points are considered vulnerable. Unlike backgammon, vulnerability is relative (being considered in terms of true hits only), mathematically continuous, and two-dimensional (on axes of probability of occurrence and upside-to-downside risk). A full point alone cannot participate in false hits (one of the most frequent methods to score) and must be accompanied by a half-point. A half-point ahead of all full points (i.e. furthest from the talon) is vulnerable to true hits without at all being 'vulnerable' to (i.e. subject to) false hits; this might be called a relative pessimum (that is, a downside-to-upside ratio of some number γ to zero). If it is seven points away from any of the opponent's men, its probabilistic vulnerability is at a maximum (that is, it is more likely than unlikely to be hit). Thus, the skilful deployment of full and half-points forms a great deal of the strategic interest of the game.

N.B.: Trictrac is a 'hitting game', but its hits are purely notional or virtual (akin to a legal fiction), such that hit blots do not move anywhere but instead provide scoring opportunities only.

==== Divisions of the board ====
Each side (compartiment) of a trictrac board has two quadrants or quarters (tables). Each player thus has two home quadrants called the:

- Petit Jan: the side with points from T to 5;
- Grand Jan: the side with points from 6 to 11.

==== Lead ====
Two methods are used to determine which of the two players has the lead (primauté):

- Coupe et dés: one of the players throws the dice from the cup against the opposing player's rail, calling "coupe et dés" (cup and dice). The player nearer the higher die goes first, moving his men based on that first die roll. If doubles are rolled or the two dice are the same distance from a player's rail, the dice are re-rolled in similar fashion. Thus, the player with the lead can never start with doubles. However, the first move only requires one dice throw.
- Simultaneous roll: each player throws a die or both dice, in turn, and the one with the highest pip count has the lead and re-rolls the two dice for the first move of the match [partie]. This allows both players the opportunity to start with doubles, but means there are three dice throws before the first turn starts.

=== Play ===
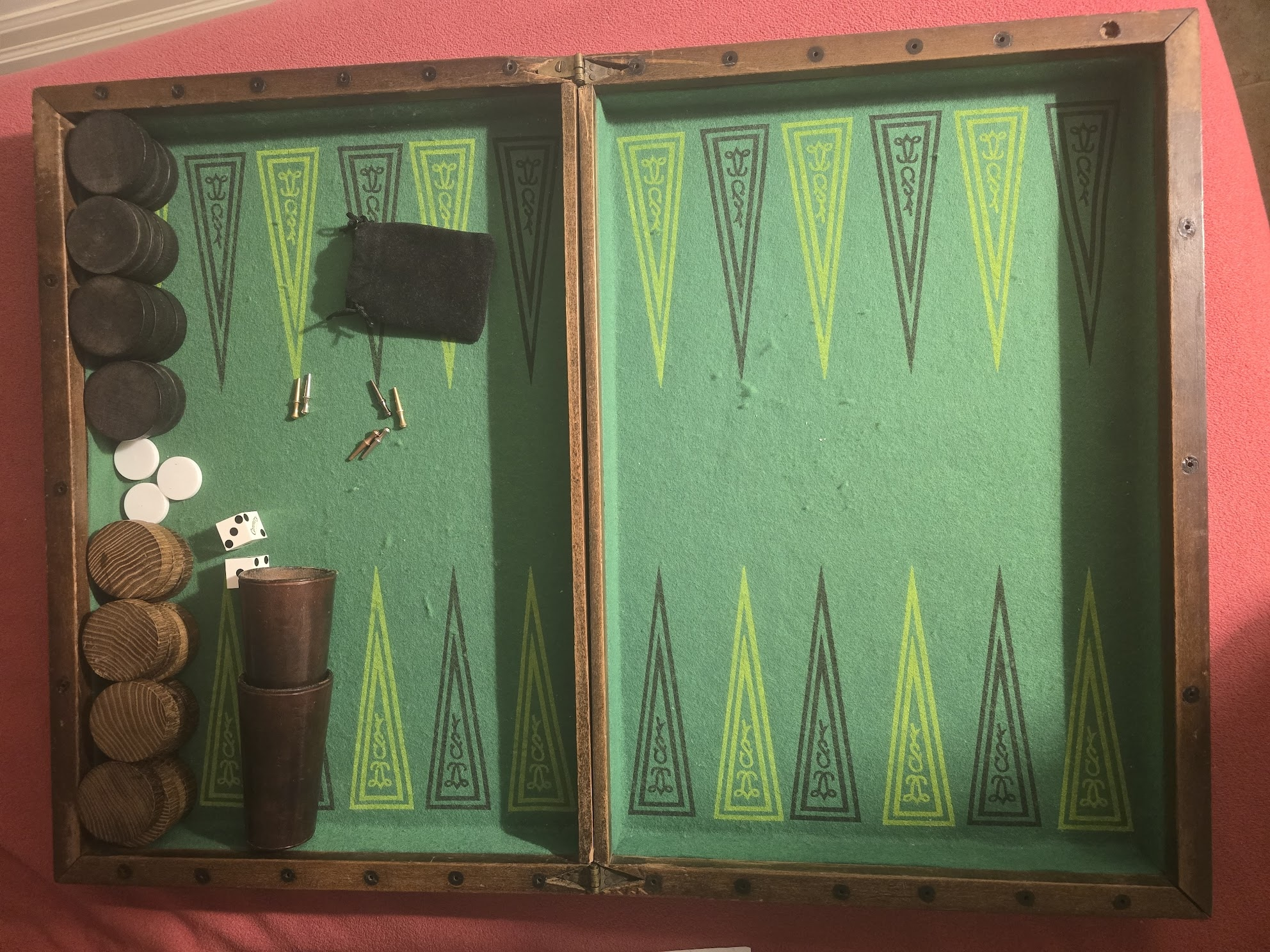
A trictrac board in baize, containing its playing equipment: fifteen men, three jetons, a pair of dice, pegs for scoring, and two dice cups.

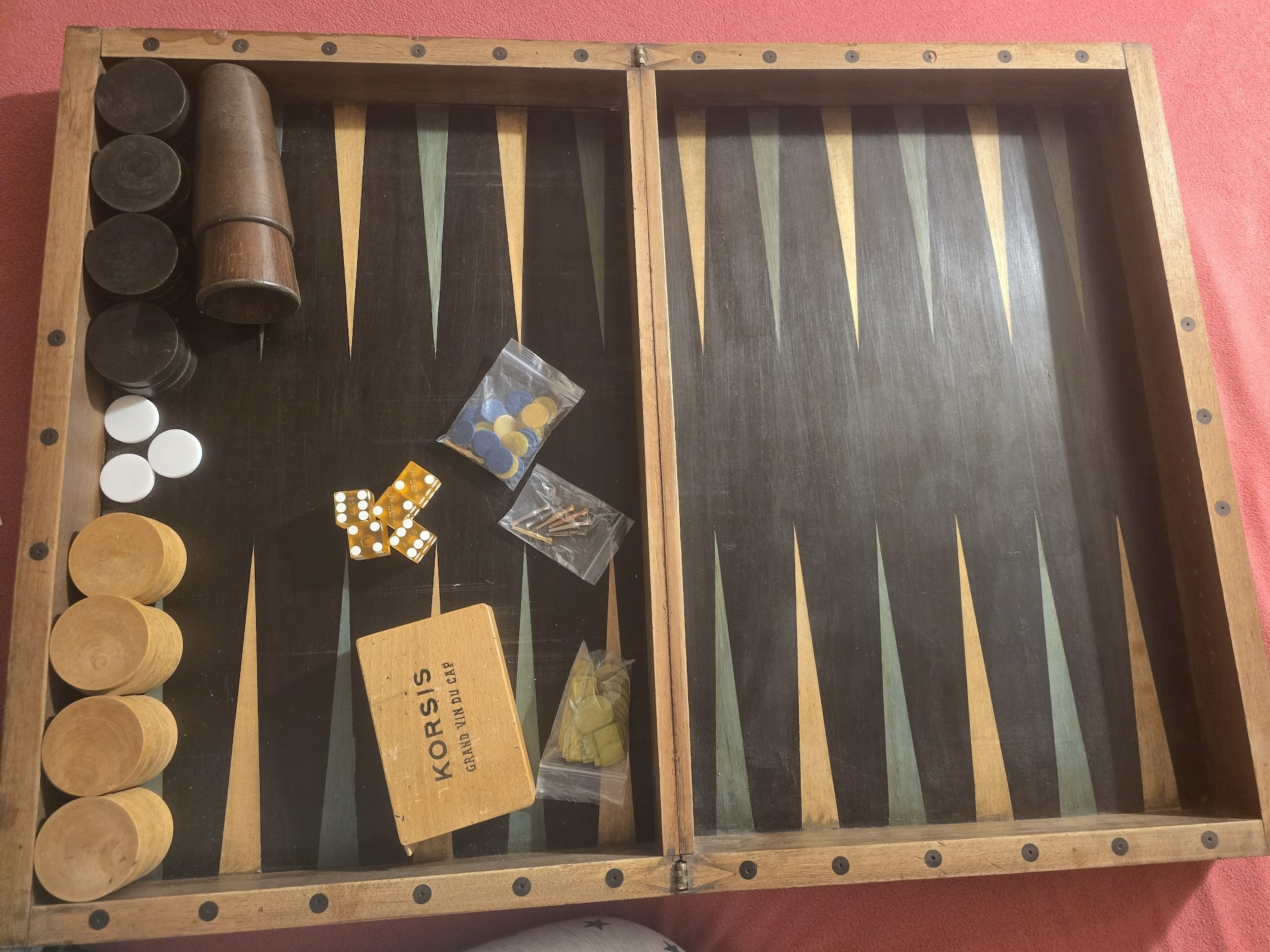
A trictrac board in wood, containing equipment for a variety of games: included is also a box of cards and a bag of jetons for the dice game 421.

In turn, each player announces the pips on the dice rolled, then the points scored and finally moves the men. Once a man is touched, the player may not change the announced points and the opponent can 'send him to school' (i.e. award him or her a penalty) for any errors made.

As soon as the men have been moved and before the next turn, the opponent must also score any points due from the current turn. If the opponent miscounts and rolls the dice for the next turn, the first player can send the opponent to school. A dice roll is a doublet (doublet) or doubles (coup double) if the two numbers are the same, and a singleton or singles (coup simple) if they are different. Single rolls are announced highest number first: e.g. "six-and-four" or "three-and-ace" (the one is always called ace).

In the French and Spanish languages, double rolls have individual names. In the case of French, most of them descend from Old French dual or Latin masculine plural distributive numerals:

- double Aces: ambesas (or its contraction besas or corruption beset) from Old French ambes meaning both;
- double 2s: binet (from Latin bini), ambesdeux (from Old French), doublé;
- double 3s: ternes (from Latin terni);
- double 4s: quaternes or quarnes (from Latin quaterni), occasionally corrupted to carmes;
- double 5s: quines (from Latin quini);
- double 6s: sonnez (from the traditional French pronunciation of Latin senis).

(In Spanish, these names are, in ascending order, ambiás, doble dos, terno, cuaderno, quina, tocad.)

These names give rise to numerous playful rhyming expressions used in their place: for example ambesas ne font grand fracas; double deuil (punning on double deux, double 2s), tous les deux [quelquefois] heureux (punning on tous les deux, all 2s) or even tous les Dieux; lanternes; quines, grise mine and qui ne me font pas les garçons; s'il éclate for 6-4 (six et quatre), etc., with these often being improvised during play. The fact that one expression for double 2s refers to funerary grief (suggesting misfortune) and the other to 'all the Gods' (suggesting excellent fortune) betrays a conclusion left as a puzzle for the reader.

In languages other than French or Spanish (such as German, Danish, and Swedish), these names are not used, and they are announced in the same format as singles (i.e. "six-and-six" in the given language) or, for example, as "six-all". "Ambsace", the English for ambesas, exists but is archaic; non-French languages also historically used French-derived numbers for singles (these being ace, deuce, trey, cater, cinque, and sice in English, but this usage is obsolescent). Nonetheless, given the vast amount of literature in that language, and its relative paucity in the others, the French nomenclature is given here for clarity.

=== Moves ===
The following rules apply to moving the men:

- For each die a man may be moved by the number of points equal to the number of pips on the die. In order for a move to be possible, the end point must not be blocked by an opponent's man.
- If a player decides to move a man the total number of pips on both dice, called "playing all-for-one" (jouer tout d'une), both the end point and the intermediate point or points must not be blocked by one or more adverse men.
- Doubles are not played twice (as they are in backgammon). With doubles, it is only possible to move a maximum of two men, each by the value of one die. That being said, doubles frequently provide a score multiplier (typically 1.5x) by way of compensation, and are thus hardly meaningless.
- The rules on occupying rest corners and moving men on the return run must also be respected.
- The overarching rule is that the pips of both dice must be used to move men when possible. If not possible, the higher one must be used if possible, otherwise the lower one. If neither can be used, a player misses a turn.
- The touch-move rule is fully in effect (given in French as "bois touché, bois joué") unless the player has announced beforehand: "I adjust" (j'adoube). Adjusting is used in trictrac to arrange men and can only be used to correct a misaligned man or move one slightly to see the colour of the point below.

A "foul" (fausse case) occurs when a man has been illegally moved. (Note: Case comes from the verb caser which meant moving men based on the dice thrown. The verb tabler is synonymous with caser) In the event of a foul, the opponent may choose where the wrongly moved man is to be placed. (Note: Presumably as long as it is a legal move per the dice.) Playing all-for-one is sometimes denoted by the conventional French abbreviation TD; likewise, using both dice to move exactly two men from the talon, called playing all-down [tout à bas], is denoted by the abbreviation TAB.

=== Dice throws ===
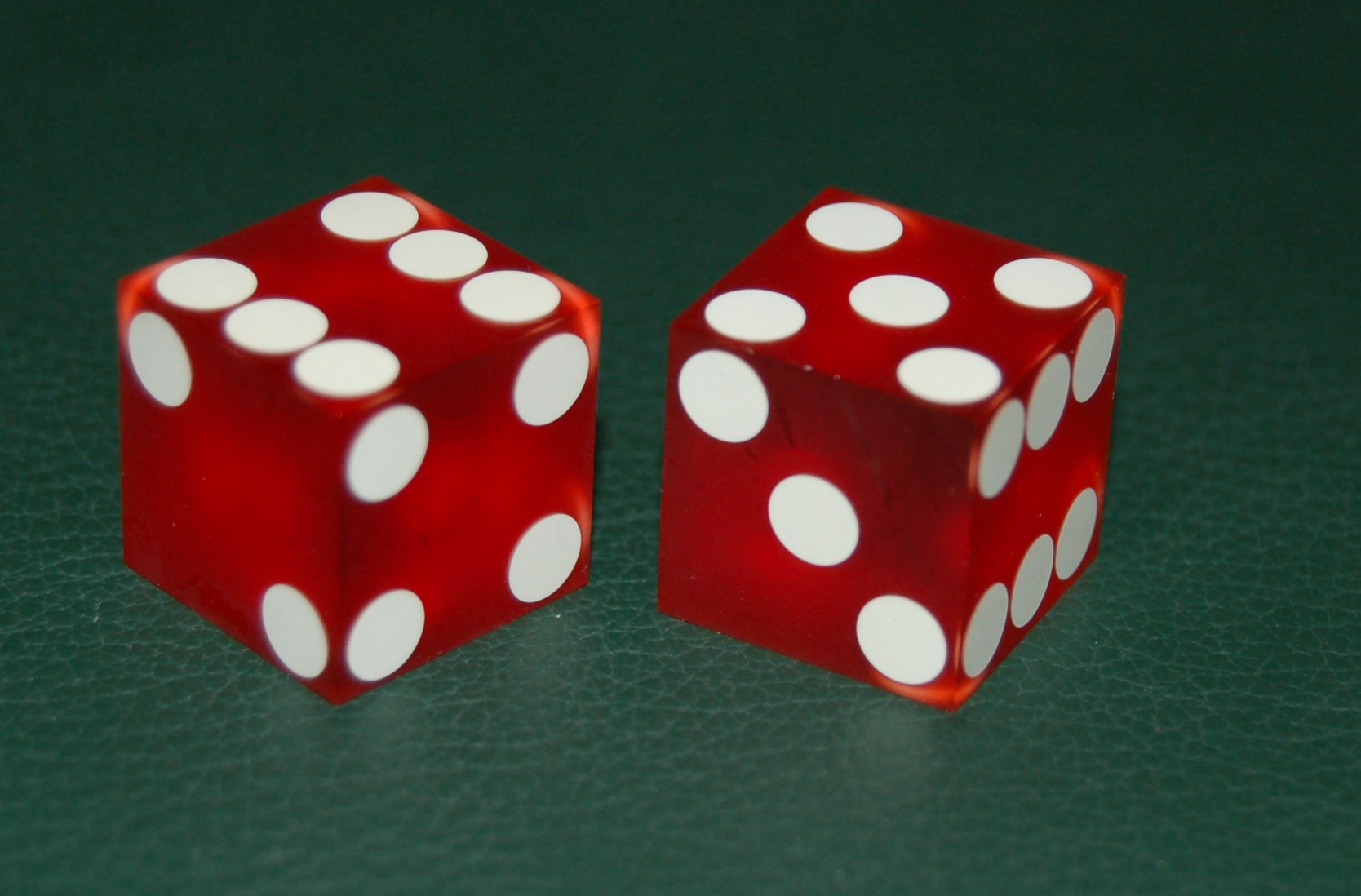
Precision dice, such as are used for large trictrac boards.

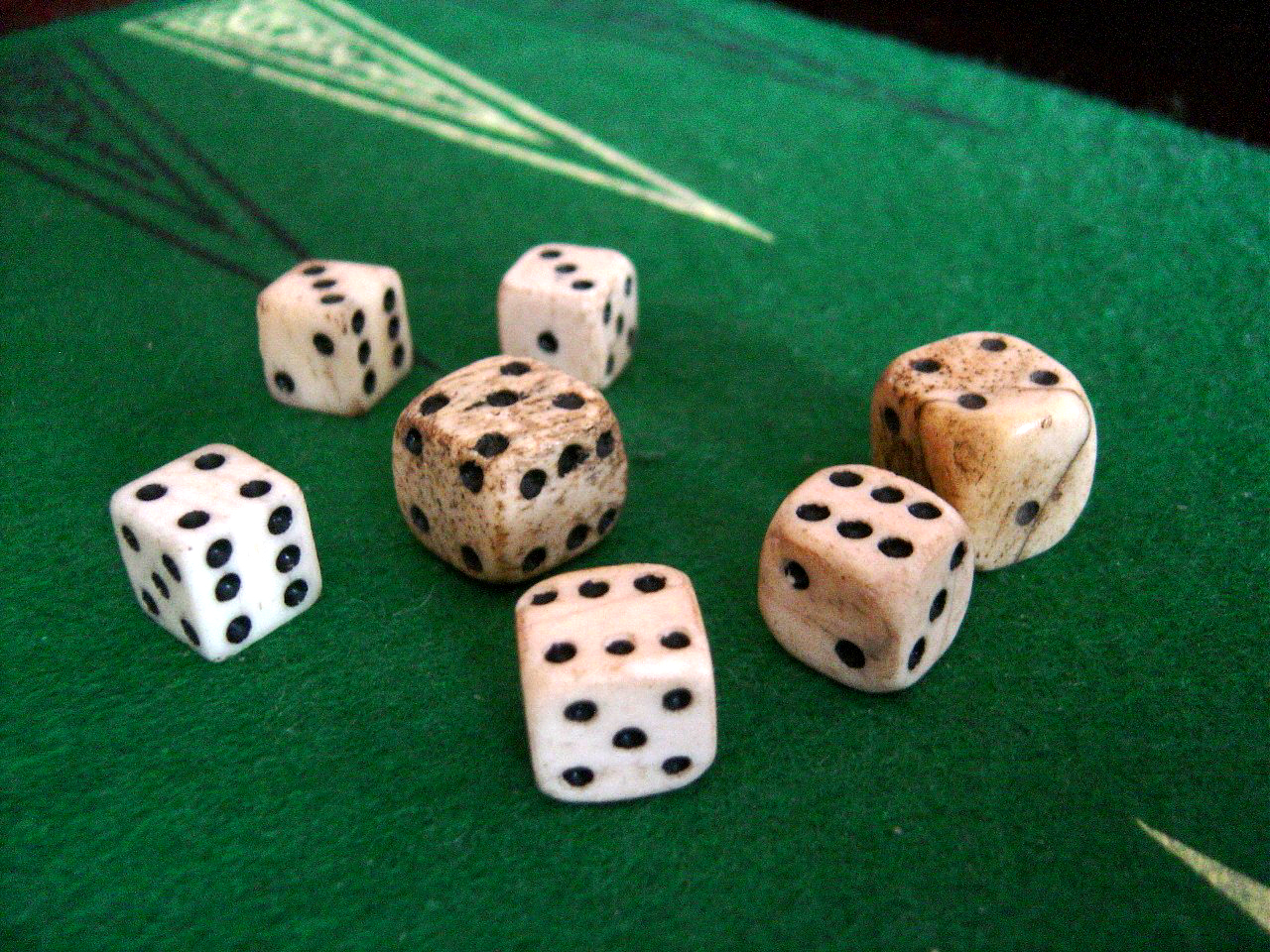
Old bone dice, some very worn and irregular.

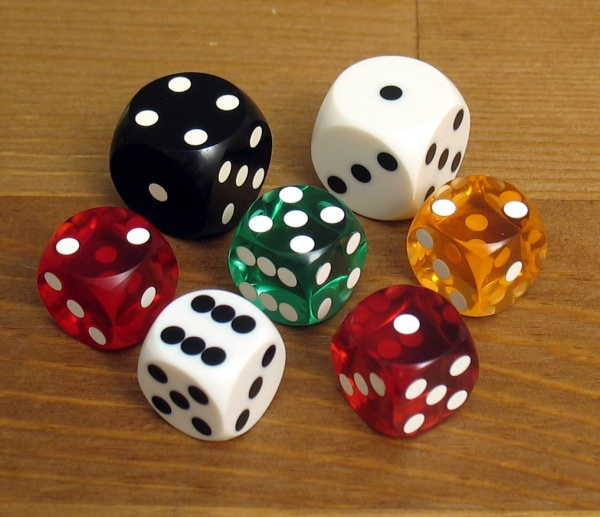
Modern precision dice.

The following rules apply to dice throws, also called dice rolls:

- On a dice roll:
  - A flat die resting on a man is valid;
  - A cocked die resting on a man or a board rail is valid if accepted by both players. Otherwise, the player who views it as valid must place a third die on top and if this 'witness die' does not slide off, the tested die is valid;
  - a die completely or partially on a token is valid;
  - a die that has jumped into the other compartment is valid, provided the above conditions are met;
  - a die outside the board or on one of its rails is invalid;
  - a die ending up on another is invalid.
- When a die is invalid, the player must re-roll both.
- If a player rolls before the opponent has finished moving men, the dice are valid and the opponent may finish moving without being penalised for a foul, since the first player has already started the next turn;
- If a player rolls the dice and they touch the opponent's hand after the opponent has finished moving men, the player may adjudge the move valid or not as desired.

==== The dice ====
Old dice carved from ivory or bone had imperfect faces and did not roll well. This same caveat applies to some modern precision dice for a different reason: they have perfectly flat faces but intentionally sharp edges. To improve random chance, both should be thrown against the opposite rail of the board using the same method as in craps, particularly if a dice cup outfitted with a lip is not being used.

Dice with rounded corners may, in the interest of noise reduction, be rolled straight onto the board—particularly in friendly play—if the players mutually agree.

==== Broken die ====
Today, a die is said to be "broken" (cassé) when it is severely tilted. This was not always the case: there was one rule for a broken die, and another for a cocked (tilted) die. The dice could break due because they were mostly made of bone and were thrown quite violently against the opposite rail of the board. If a die broke in two and only one man showed its points, the throw was good.

=== Rest corners ===
A player's rest corner (coin de repos) is point number 11. Its occupation and release are subject to the following rules:

- To place more than two men on a rest corner, the player whose corner it is must first take it with two men simultaneously. The rest corner may then receive extra men – one by one or two by two – during subsequent throws;
- Taking the corner is not compulsory unless it is the only legal move possible;
- To release the rest corner, all builders (extra men) are moved off first, and then the last two are removed on the same dice throw;
- A player may retake the rest corner having released it;
- A player may never take the opponent's rest corner;
- An empty rest corner – of either player – may be used as an intermediate point when moving a man by the sum of two dice.

There are two ways to take a rest corner:

- "By effect" (par effet) by placing two men directly on it. This is also called taking it "naturally" (naturellement) or "directly" (directement);
- "By force" (par puissance), by being able to move two men directly to the unoccupied rest corner of the opponent. In the same turn, the player moves the two men to the opponent's rest corner and then immediately to his or her own rest corner.

Further rules apply to taking the rest corner:

- Extra men may be added to the rest corner by effect but not by force;
- If a rest corner can be taken either by force or by effect, it must be taken by effect.
- Taking a rest corner does not (by itself) score.

From a tactical point of view, to have more chances of taking your rest corner, it is worth having one or two builders (extra men) on points 5 and 6 while the opponent's corner is still empty, but when the opponent has taken it, it is better not to have too many on point 6. Under these conditions, these builders enable a die throw of six to be used. These advantageous positions for taking the rest corner led players to call points 5 and 6 the 'businessman's corner'.

=== Points, holes and jans ===
A match (partie entière or tour) in trictrac is played over a number of holes (parties simples or, more commonly, trous). In the vicar's game, this number is twelve; in trictrac à écrire and in trictrac combiné, it is an indeterminate number greater than six (the determinate number, to which the entire match is played and which is agreed upon beforehand, is that of marks [marqués]).

Each time a player scores one or more holes, the corresponding peg is moved along the side rail of the board. The first hole is marked at the base of the talon, the twelfth at the base of the rest corner. In the vicar's game, when the peg of either player reaches the twelfth hole, the match is over and that player wins.

To score a hole a player must score twelve points. These points are earned in game situations called jans, in hitting (battre; a battue is a hit), but also from bearing off all of a player's men and from the opponent's point-counting errors called "schools" (écoles).

Keeping track of the points scored is done on the board itself using three tokens, initially placed between the two talons against the end rail. This initial position corresponds to zero points.

==== Point scoring ====
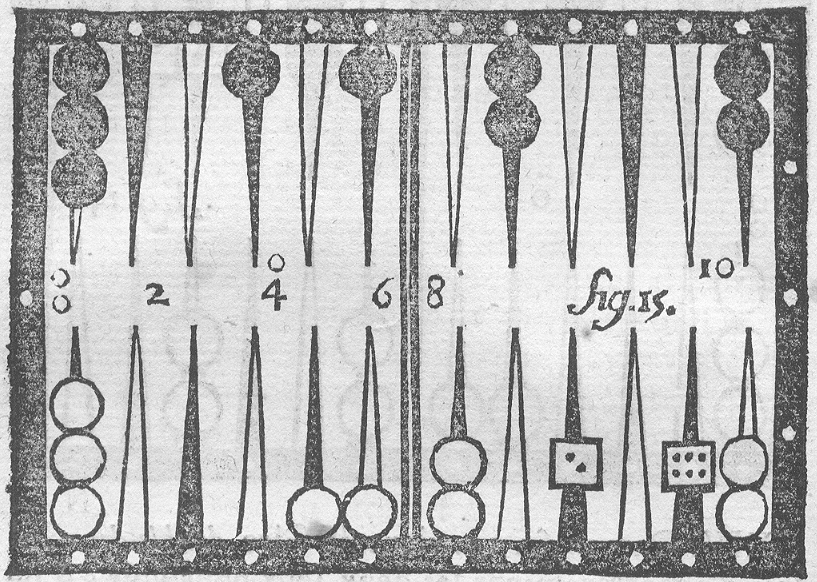
Le Grand Trictrac, Soumille, Hansy, 1766, p. 14. Figure showing the location of the tokens according to the points scored. 10 points are actually scored against the end rail. "Black" has 0 holes and 4 points, and "White" has yet to score.

Trictrac points are always scored in twos; the score being indicated by placing a token at the following locations (see diagram – right):

- 2 points: by the tip of point 1 (on the side nearest point 2);
- 4 points: by the tip of point 3 (on the side nearest point 4);
- 6 points: by the tip of point 5 (on the side nearest the bridge);
- 8 points: by the tip of point 6 (on the side nearest the bridge);
- 10 points: by the tip of point 11 (on the side nearest the end rail);
- 12 points: at the start position between the two talons (a hole having been scored).

For example, Michelle has 6 points, her token is by the tip of point 5 on the side nearest the bridge (i.e. centre bar). If she scores 4 more points she moves her token to the tip of point 11 on the side by the end rail, indicating that she now has 10 points. If she now wins 2 more points, she will score 1 hole (or 2 in case of a lurch or bredouille) by moving her peg one hole further and replacing her token back at the start between the talons. In this example, Michelle announces what has just been scored: "1 (or 2) holes and none left over" or "1 hole, even", but if instead of scoring 2 points she had scored 4 she would have marked her hole(s) and moved her token to the tip of point 1 by announcing "1 (or 2) holes and 2 points over". The theoretical maximum is 82 points.

The choice of the positions of the eighth and tenth points is justified by the need to leave enough room on the board to throw the dice without hitting the tokens.

==== Bredouille ====
When a player starts from the talon and scores 12 points without the opponent scoring any, it is a 'lurch' and that player advances two holes. The lurch token – jeton de bredouille or simply bredouille – is a special token (identical to the other two) used to show when a lurch (double holes) is on the cards.

A player who scores points while the opponent remains on zero, is said to be 'on lurch' (en bredouille) and a player reaching twelve points before the opponent scores any "wins the lurch" (gagne bredouille).

When one player scores 12 points while the other player's token is still on the talon, there is no need for the bredouille as it is obvious that the points have been scored without the other player getting off the mark. If, however, the first player does not reach 12 points, the second player may, in turn, be able to make a run of 12 and thus score two holes. In this case the first player's token will not be at the start, so to note that the second player is now 'on lurch', a second token, the 'bredouille' , is placed alongside the first.

If, subsequently, the first player were to score points before second player reaches 12, the lurch is no longer possible and the bredouille is returned to its starting point between the two talons. The second player has lost the opportunity for a lurch (débredouille). As the two players now each have only one token, whoever wins can only advance his peg one hole.

==== Holding, going and games ====
A player winning a partie (i.e. reaching 12 points and scoring a hole) on his dice roll (and only then), has the choice between continuing the current game or starting a new one:

- Holding, remaining (tenir, rester): the player scores the remaining points and resets the opponent's to zero by replacing the opponent's token and, if deployed, the bredouille, by the talon rail. The game continues with alternating turns and the opponent scores points acquired on the last move of the partie just ended. The decision may be announced with "I'm holding" (je tiens) or "I'm remaining" (je reste);
- Going, returning (s'en aller, renvoyer): the player places the three tokens by the talon rail, thus giving up his remaining points, and returning all men to the talon, the opponent doing likewise. The opponent cannot score any points gained on that go. The decision may be announced with "I'm going" (je m'en vais) or "I'm returning" (je renvoie). By going, the player acquires the privilege of the rolling first for the next move.

Any declaration or action to remain or go must be acted upon and is not revocable.

The period of play between two placements of the men on the talons is called a game (relevé) or a holding (tenue):

- The first game runs from the start of the entire match to the first pickup (renvoi), which is when the player chooses to "go" and start a new game;
- The following ones go from one pickup to the next;
- The last game runs from the last pickup to the end of the match;

There is another type of pickup which is not related to a player's decision but to the bearing off of the men.

Should a player reach twelve points on the dice roll of his opponent, he holds automatically.

==== Rare jans ====
Jans are point scoring feats. 'Rare' jans (jans rares) can only be achieved at the very start of a game (relevé). The actual score depends on whether the last dice throw resulted in singles or doubles. There are five rare jans:

1. Jan de trois coups or jan de six tables
  - Feat: awarded when the first three dice rolls allow the player to place one man on each of the six points after the talon.
  - Score: 4 points.
  - Note: it cannot be achieved if doubles are rolled even once during this time.
  - Move: to score the player does not actually have to move the last two men to line them up with the first four. This jan can thus be scored 'by force' (par puissance).
2. Jan de deux tables
  - Feat: awarded if, having only moved two men out of the talon, the dice roll allows one man to be moved to the player's rest corner and the other to the opponent's empty rest corner.
  - Score: 4 points if achieved by singles or 6 points by doubles.
  - Move: The rules on the occupation of resting corners prohibit actually making this move, so it is scored only 'by force' (never 'by effect').
3. Contre-jan de deux tables
  - Feat: same as jan de deux tables but the opponent occupies his rest corner.
  - Score: opponent scores 4 points (singles) or 6 points (doubles).
  - Move: same as jan de deux tables.
4. Jan de mézéas
  - Feat: awarded when, having released only two men from the talon which occupy his resting corner while that of the opponent is empty, the player rolls one or two aces.
  - Score: 4 points (singles) or 6 points (doubles).
  - Move: same as jan de deux tables.
5. Contre-jan de mézéas
  - Feat: same as jan de mézéas but the opponent is already in his corner of rest.
  - Score: the opponent earns 4 points (singles) or 6 points (doubles).
  - Move: same as jan de deux tables.

==== Filling jans ====
The board is made up of four quadrants each of six points. A filling jan [jan de remplissage] or simply a fill [plein] is made when a player has at least two men on each of the six points in any one of the following three quadrants:

1. Petit Jan: in the quadrant containing the player's talon
2. Grand Jan: in the quadrant with the player's rest corner
3. Jan de Retour: in the quadrant with the opponent's talon

The remaining quadrant cannot be filled because a player may not occupy the opponent's rest corner. Filling a quadrant is referred to as "making" it. A player must fill a quadrant if able; failure to do so incurs 'school' and 'foul' penalties.

Having rolled singles, when a player only has one blot to cover to fill the quadrant, there may be three different ways of doing so: with only one man, with either of two men from two different points, or with one man played "all for one" using the sum of the two dice. Having rolled doubles, it is only possible to fill in one or two ways: with one man using one die or with one man using both dice. A player able to fill a quadrant in more than one way has the choice. In the event that there is not one half point left to cover but two, it is only possible to fill in one way, only the last of the two men played actually filling the quadrant.

For a filled jan, for each way it may be filled, a player scores 4 points if by singles and 6 points if by doubles.

Once a player has filled a quadrant, the player must preserve it (conserver son plein) if at all possible during the turns that follow, under pain of school and foul penalties. When a player can no longer preserve a full quadrant, the player 'breaks it' (rompre son plein), but this may only be done if there is no other option.

If there is no choice but to preserve the quadrant, the player scores 4 points if by singles and 6 points if by doubles.

As always, points must be scored before touching the men or the school penalty is incurred.

==== Hitting opponent's men ====
When one of a player's dice would enable a move onto a point occupied by the opponent with just one man, that man is said to be hit (battu). A man is hit directly if the distance to the opposing man equals the number of pips on one die, or indirectly if the distance equals the sum of the pips on both dice.

In trictrac, a hit man remains in place and the one that hit cannot join it because the movement rules don't allow it. Hitting an opponent's man is therefore always done 'by force' (i.e., virtually). There are two types of hits:

1. it is a true hit (battue à vrai) if the man is
  1. hit directly, or
  2. hit indirectly and the intermediate point is not occupied by more than one opposing man;
2. it is a false hit (battue à faux) if it is indirectly hit and the intermediate point is occupied by two or more opposing men.

A man can suffer a true hit in up to three ways (façons) or manners (manières) by singles, once or twice directly and once indirectly, and in either one or two ways by doubles, once directly and once indirectly. (Mathematically, the man can be hit by α, by β, and by α+β, except if α=β, whereupon it can be hit by α and 2α.) It can never be falsely hit except in one way (by α+β, or, iff α=β, by 2α).

For each way the opponent's man can be hit, the player earns the relevant points (see below). A man hit truly cannot be hit falsely and vice versa, but a true hit and false hit may occur on the same roll of the dice.

A true hit earns the player:

- by singles in the outer table (i.e., in either grand jan), 2 points;
- by doubles in the outer table (i.e., in either grand jan) 4 points;
- by singles in the home table (i.e. in either petit jan), 4 points;
- by doubles in the home table (i.e. in either petit jan), 6 points.

A false hit earns the opponent the same points as given in the table above. The points gained by the player who rolled the dice are scored before any false hits are scored by the opponent, so that if the player who made the true hit wins a partie and "goes", thus ending the current game, his opponent can no longer score the points for false hits.

From a tactical point of view, the occupation of the 10-point early in a game may prove hazardous, reducing the chances of making a grand jan and being able to hit the opponent's men. Its situation close to the aftergame, giving more possibilities to 'truly hit' the opponent's men in the petit jan quadrant, often makes it the preferred point for beginners notwithstanding the risks involved, which has led the players to christen it the "schoolboy's point". Circumstances, in particular when the opponent is the only one to have taken his rest corner, can make the occupation of the 10-point favourable.

==== Hitting opponent's corner ====
While a player may not occupy the opponent's rest corner, it is possible to 'hit the corner' (battre le coin). To do so, the player's own rest corner must be taken and the opponent's rest corner must be empty.

Subject to these preconditions if, on a dice roll a player can 'virtually' move two men to the opponent's rest corner, the corner is hit. All the men able to move directly into the opponent's rest corner are eligible to participate in the hitting, except those occupying the player's rest corner. For the latter, only the builders (extra men) can contribute.

Hitting the opponent's corner earns the player 4 points for singles and 6 points for doubles. These points are gained by force; the opponent's corner can never actually be occupied. The opponent's corner is never falsely hit, so if both corners are occupied, neither player is able to hit the opponent's.

==== Bonus and powerless jans ====
The bonus jan (jan de récompense) and powerless jan (jan qui ne peut) are umbrella categories consisting of events already mentioned. While the use of these terms is somewhat rare in practice, the categories are nonetheless valid and discussed in the literature.

A bonus jan is earned either by:

- Truly hitting the opponent's man; or by
- Hitting the corner.

A powerless jan is conceded (i.e. one's opponent earns points) either by:

- Falsely hitting the opponent's man; or by
- Being helpless or impotent (impuissant) to play the pips on one or both dice.

In the latter case, if the player is unable to move one or two men, his opponent scores 2 points per "impotent die/man" (dé impuissant or dame impuissante), whether the roll yielded singles or doubles.

If a player concedes points to his opponent for one or more impotent dice, but at the same time preserves his grand jan, the player still scores for keeping the grand jan. This is called 'preservation by impotence' (conserver par impuissance). The governing rule calls for playing both dice and, if only one can be played, playing the higher must always be observed, even at the cost of breaking up a filled quadrant.

==== Bearing off ====
A player who has moved all men to the last quadrant, may 'bear off' i.e. take them off the board. However, the rules of filling and preservation must be respected concerning the jan de retour.

Two methods of bearing off coexist:

- The 'slow', 'provincial', or 'French' method (as in bräde)
- The 'quick', 'Parisian', or 'English' method (as in backgammon)

Historically, the quick method prevailed. It follows these rules:

- The end rail next to the talons is considered as a point.
- A man landing on the rail is borne off.
- A die roll greater than that necessary to move the furthest man to the rail is said to be 'overshooting' (excédant) and allows this man to be borne off.
- If it is not possible to bear a man off, the player has to make normal board moves.

Being the first player to bear off fifteen men scores 4 points for singles or 6 points for doubles.

If on the last move there is only one man left to bear off and the amount of one die is sufficient, it does not affect the scoring and the second die is ignored. Once the points have been scored, the two players replace the men on the opposite talons. They therefore change the colour of their men with each pickup. If no hole is immediately won, the points acquired are retained by both players. The privilege of starting the next pickup (relevé) goes to the one who bore his men off first.

The provincial method consists of playing all that is playable on the board and allowing only the men furthest from the talon to be borne off, dice permitting. Exceptionally, a player who has filled a jan de retour may preserve it by bearing off his extra men, but only if they can be moved exactly onto the end rail. The player can 'preserve by privilege' (conserver par privilège) in this way up to three times.

==== Obsolete jans ====
Three ways to score points were in practice abandoned in the first half of the 17th century:

1. Meeting jan (jan de rencontre)
  - Feat: On the very first ply of each match, if the second player to move obtains the same result of the dice as the first to move and the lead was determined by simultaneous higher roll, a meeting jan takes place. (This jan is unique in that the opportunity to score it arises only once per match, under specific conditions, at a specific time only, as well as in that if it is not scored at that time, it is permanently missed.)
  - Score: 4 points (singles) or 6 points (doubles).
  - Notes: Lalanne suggests that this jan be retained in current practice. He justifies it by an appeal to fairness: the jan de rencontre, he claims, is ordered to restoring the odds between the player who had obtained the lead by chance and his opponent. He notes that this concern does not apply to subsequent relevés, because on those occasions, the lead is not due to chance but to play. The reason, according to Lalanne, that the meeting jan is not to be scored if lead is determined by the later "cup and dice" method is that, in exchange for the lead, it automatically handicaps the player who wins it by eliminating the 1-in-6 chance that he rolls doubles as well as having the advantage of the lead. Simultaneous prior roll, the opening generally practiced today, does not come with an automatic handicap; meeting jan exists, therefore, for compensatory purposes only.
2. Pile of misfortune (pile de malheur) or pile of misery (pile de misère)
  - Feat: If a player stacks 15 men on his or her resting corner owing to an opponent blocking the aftergame, this gives rise to a pile of misfortune.
  - Score: Establishing a pile of misfortune scores 4 points (singles) and 6 points (doubles). Much like a fill (plein), preserving one scores likewise every turn.
  - Notes: Lalanne suggests that this jan also be retained in current practice. Lalanne and Levy conjecture that the purpose of this jan was to pressure the opponent into opening the way; Lalanne also notes that, in practice, this jan is extremely rare and has an effectively negligible effect on strategy.
3. Margot la fendue ("Split-Tailed Margot")
  - Feat: When a player's roll (virtually) places his man on the only empty point between two blots of the opponent (that is, blot-space-blot), a Margot la fendue takes place.
  - Score: 2 points (singles) or 4 points (doubles) in favour of the opponent.
  - Notes: The aim of this jan is to punish the player for a near miss. The name of this jan showcases the game's sense of humour: Margot was at one time considered a prototypical name for a prostitute, and fente is colloquial French for the labia majora, leading to an analogy being drawn between the blots and the female vulva. Lalanne suggests that this jan was abandoned for reasons of modesty, although he counsels that it should remain purely unofficial due to the significant effect it has on the strategy of the game.

The former two are noted and generally considered to be valid in modern play; the term 'obsolete' is an atavism (i.e., a throwback to former times, when they were indeed considered obsolete).

=== Scoring summary table ===
The following summary table is based on Lalanne:

	Points by singles per way	Points by doubles per way	Number of possible ways	Scored by
RARE JANS				
Jan de six tables	4	n/a	1	Player
Jan de deux tables	4	6	1	Player
Jan de mézéas	4	6	1	Player
Contre jan de deux tables	4	6	1	Adversary
Contre jan de mézéas	4	6	1	Adversary
BONUS JANS				
True hit on man in outer table	2		1, 2 or 3	Player
True hit on man in outer table		4	1 or 2	Player
True hit on man in home table	4		1, 2 or 3	Player
True hit on man in home table		6	1 or 2	Player
Hitting opponent's corner	4	6	1	Player
POWERLESS JANS				
False hit on man in outer table	2	4	1	Adversary
False hit on man in home table	4	6	1	Adversary
For each impotent man (unplayable die)	2	2	n/a	Adversary
FILLING JANS				
Establishing a grand jan, petit jan or jan de retour	4		1, 2, or 3	Player
Establishing a grand jan, petit jan or jan de retour		6	1 or 2	Player
Preserving grand jan, petit jan or jan de retour	4	6	1	Player
OTHER				
Being first to bear off one's men	4	6	n/a	Player
Establishing a pile of misfortune	4	6	1	Player
Preserving a pile of misfortune	4	6	1	Player
Meeting jan (conditions apply)	4	6	n/a	Player
Split-tailed Margot (optional)	2		1, 2, or 3	Adversary
Split-tailed Margot (optional)		4	1 or 2	Adversary

(n/a = not applicable)

=== Aftergame ===
The aftergame (jeu de retour) begins when one of the players moves at least one of his men to the opponent's side. The movement of the men is restricted by the rules of proceeding to the aftergame (passer au retour):

- A player may not move any man onto the aftergame as long as the opponent has the chance of making a petit jan;
- When the opponent can no longer make a petit jan but is still able to make a grand jan, men may not be placed in the third quadrant, but any free points may be used to move men to the last quadrant;
- When the opponent can no longer achieve a petit jan or a grand jan, the player may place his men on any free point of the aftergame with the exception of the rest corner which can only be used, if empty, as an intermediate point. Tactically, the aftergame plays out differently from the foregame. The objectives consist of:
- Preserving the ''grand jan'' for as long as possible while making scoring hits;
- Spoiling the opponent’s game by slowing down his passage on the return run and by scoring for helpless men;
- Making and preserving the ''jan de retour'' for as long as possible;
- Bearing off all the men first.

It is always possible to interrupt the aftergame by going after winning a hole on a dice roll. The men on the aftergame can hit opposing men and vice versa.

=== Enfilade ===
An enfilade is a significant run of successful holes in succession in a single game, typically about five to six holes in a row. It is the most sought after achievement in the game. It is the source of the French expression 'to be enfiladed' (être enfilé or se faire enfiler). It is most often realised when a player has made a grand jan while having three extra men far enough back to preserve it as long as possible and to score false hits, and at the same time the opponent can no longer make his own grand jan leaving gaps for the opposing extra men. To avoid being enfiladed, it is important to plan for it and sacrifice several holes to get the opponent to "go", rather than losing the match [tour] by enfilade.

=== Infringements ===
Gaming infringements are of two types:

- "Fouls" i.e. incorrect moves of the men;
- "Schools" i.e. incorrect point scoring.

Fouls and schools are always handled by the opponent of the offender, each player refereeing the other.

==== Fouls ====
When a player makes an illegal move, it is a "foul" (fausse case). Generally speaking, a player is never allowed to retract a move. Picking up the men always signifies that you are 'going' after winning a partie. A player cannot commit a foul by hitting his opponent's men.

Fouls occur when:

1. a man has been moved by a number of points that do not match the value of one of the dice;
2. a man has been moved to a point beyond the one where it should have been moved for the sum of the two dice;
3. the rest corner was taken by force when it could have been taken by effect;
4. a quadrant was not filled when it could have been;
5. a filled quadrant was not preserved when it could have been;
6. the rules of passage on the return run were not respected in that a man was played into a quadrant that the opponent could still fill;
7. a player has placed a single man in either of the rest corners.

Due to the touch-move rule (dame touchée, dame jouée), it is not always necessary for a man to have actually been moved for a foul to occur. One just has to work out where it can end up.

The touch-move rule prohibits the player from changing the situation once the man has been let go of. All fouls must be corrected by the opponent in accordance with the rules of movement. The opponent is only master of those men that contributed to the wrong move.

The treatment of the foul depends on the situation:

1. A man has been moved a number of points that do not match the value of one of the dice:
  - If a man is placed on a point that does not correspond to any of the moves allowed by the dice, the opponent may leave the man where it is, or move it to where it should have gone;
  - If two men were wrongly played together, the opponent can leave them where they are or rectify the position of one or both men, by moving them by the minimum amount allowable by the values of the dice. The opponent can also return the two men to their initial position and have only one played for the sum of the two dice.
2. A man has been placed on a point beyond where it should have been for the sum of the two dice:
  - If it is the first man and the second has not yet been touched, the two dice are considered played and the opponent can prohibit the movement of a second man leaving the first as it is or by correcting its position for the sum of the two dice;
  - If two men have been played, one legally, the opponent may leave the other as it is or rectify the incorrectly played one based on the value of the second die.
3. A player took the rest corner by power when it could have been taken by effect:
  - The opponent can return a man to its original place and have the other moved for the sum of the two dice, subject to the rules around the return run;
  - If that is not possible, the opponent must return the two men to their original places and let the offender move as desired. However, the player is not allowed to take the rest corner on this go unless no other solution is possible.
4. If a player has not filled a quadrant when able, his opponent has the choice of leaving things as they are or forcing the player to fill it. The foul is counted the instant a man is touched and the quadrant can no longer be filled. In addition, the offender is 'sent to school'.
5. If a player did not preserve quadrant when able, the opponent can leave things as they are or let the offender replay as desired without breaking the quadrant. The foul is counted the instant the breaking man is touched. In addition, the offending player is sent to school.
6. The rules of the aftergame have not been respected:
  - If a player has moved a man that has progressed to the aftergame into a quadrant (petit jan or grand jan) that the opponent could still fill, the latter must if possible make the offender replay correctly
  - If, however, the offender realises his mistake before the opponent rolls the dice, it may be corrected without penalty;
  - If neither player has seen the foul in the third quadrant and the opponent only realises it after having thrown the dice, the offender may be forced to play the offending man on the next turn into the last quadrant. But once this next move is over, or the grand jan is no longer possible, the opponent can no longer enforce this;
  - If neither player has seen the foul in the fourth quadrant, the opponent having rolled his dice, it is no longer possible to take action;
  - If a player has touched a man that ends up in his empty rest corner or that of the opponent, the latter may force the player to move this man to the return run if that is possible or else let the player rethrow and replay as desired.
7. If a player has placed a single man in either empty rest corner, the opponent cannot leave it as it is and must have it replayed legally. If this is not possible the opponent simply puts it back in its original place and lets the player move another man.

The strict rules governing fouls are due to the fact that points scored by the dice roll affect the opponent as well as the player who rolled.

==== Schools ====
In trictrac a school (école) is any error in scoring points on one's own turn. The player at fault "loses" points (in fact, his opponent gains) corresponding to the difference between those actually scored and those that should have been scored. The opponent "schools him" without being required to give the reason. There are four basic cases:

1. Underscoring (l'école par moins) occurs when a player scores fewer points than earned. The school is claimed as soon as the player at fault touches one of his men or, on a jan which cannot, when the player has thrown the dice. The opponent sends the offending player to school and scores the point difference.
2. Overscoring (l'école par trop) occurs when a player scores more points than earned. The school is claimed as soon as the offending player has placed his man beyond the point it should have been moved to. The opponent sends the offender to school and scores the excess points.
3. A filling error (l'école liée au remplissage) occurs when a player does not fill a quadrant when able. The school is claimed as soon as the offending player touches one of his positioned men in such a way that the quadrant cannot be filled on that go. The offender has also made a foul and if the opponent forces the offender to fill, this does not affect the school penalty.
4. A preserving error (l'école liée à la conservation d'un plein) occurs when a player does not preserve a full quadrant when able. The school is claimed as soon as the offender touches a man that breaks up the quadrant. The opponent claims the points scored by the offending player and scores the points for preservation instead of the player. The offender has also made a foul and if the opponent forces the offender to keep his quadrant full, this does not affect the school penalty.

For greater clarity in the game, it is best to wait before scoring the school until the offending player has either touched one of his men or rolled the dice, as the case may be.

Any school can be contested by the player 'being schooled' according to a procedure which may include two phases:

1. False school (fausse école): when a player is in error in sending his opponent to school, the opponent goes to school instead. This is called a false school. The opponent then sends to the school the one who made the false school claim by deducting the points improperly scored replacing his own token in the original place and then adding the points for the false school.
2. School raise (l'augmentation d'école): if, following a declaration of "false school", the first player proves that there was indeed a valid school, that player scores a school raise, by restoring the tokens to the state of the first school and doubling the school points won. To avoid an escalation, the player applying the school increase is required to explain why there was a school and, if wrong, that player would submit to the rule of the false school one last time.

Schools should always benefit the one who did not commit them without being able to abuse them. With this in mind, three rules are applicable when dealing with schools:

- There is no "school of schools" (école d'école): players are never compelled to score a school, but may ignore it completely.
- It is acceptable to correct the opponent's mistake without scoring school points.
- School points must be scored in their entirety, a player who has been sent to school can force his opponent to do so if the opponent has made a mistake as well.

=== Game structure ===
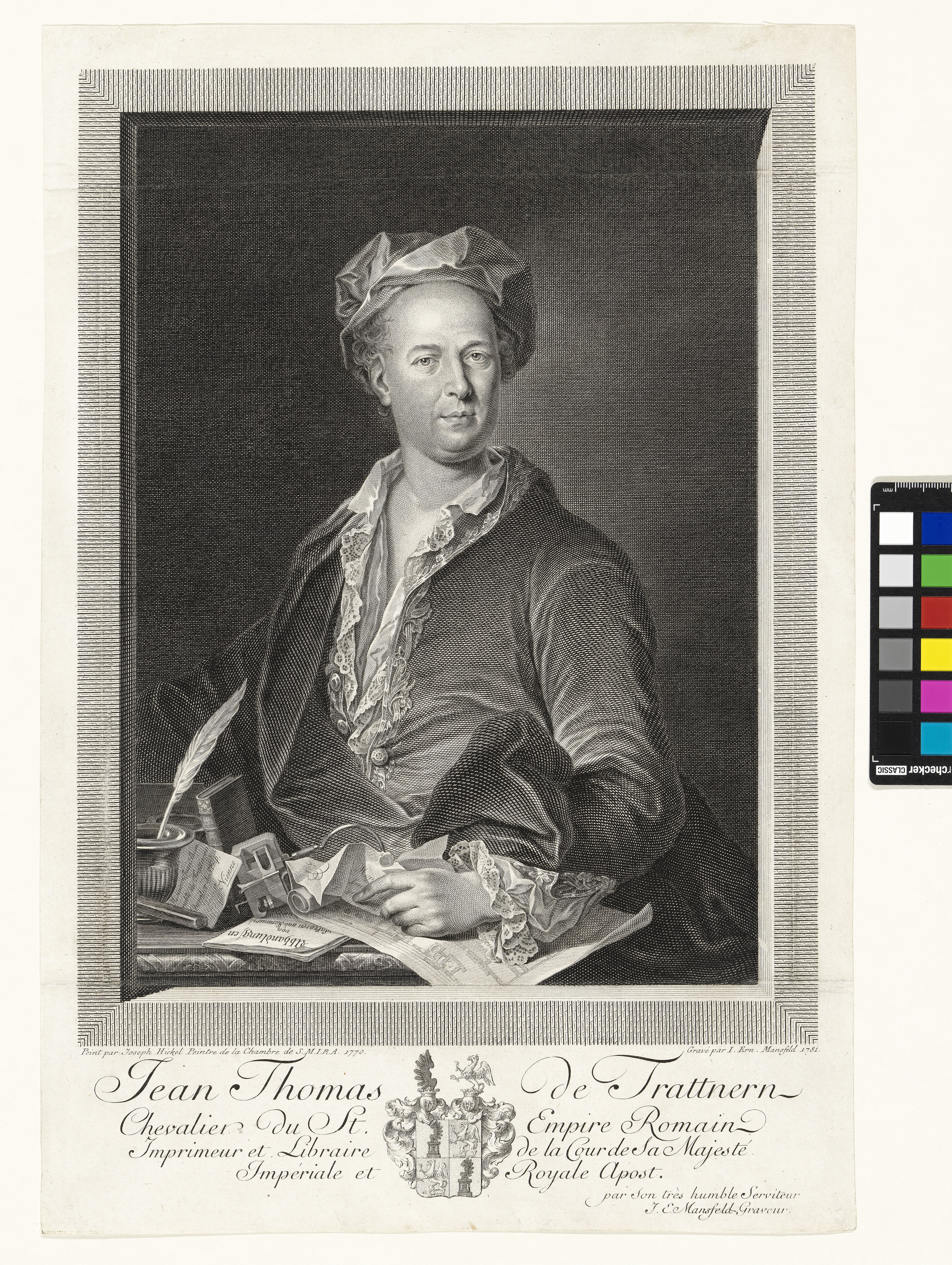
János Tamás Trattner

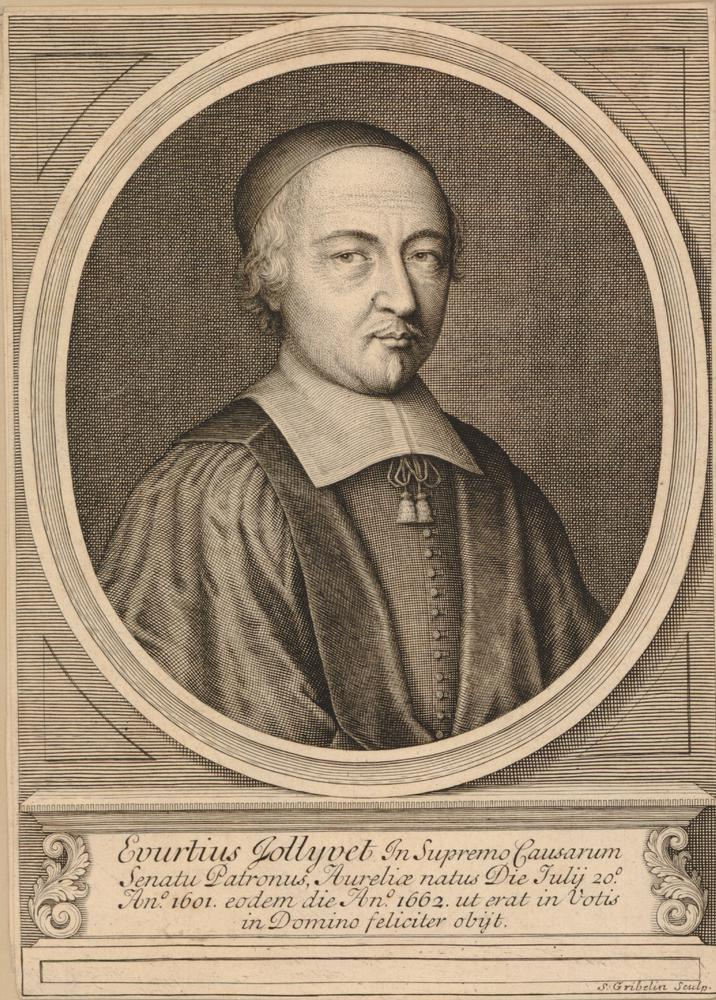
Euverte Jollivet

It is here that trictrac splits into the vicar's game (jeu de curé), trictrac à écrire, and trictrac combiné; the basic rules (as described above) are the same, but the structure laid on top is different in terms of scoring as well as in terms of gaming equipment (see above). (The terms vicar's game and à écrire are used by analogy with piquet, the former being to 100 points in that game.)

The balance of probabilities is that the vicar's game represents trictrac in its original codified form: many of the early authorities (Charpentier, Jollivet, and Soumille) discuss no other variation, and it is often what is meant by the term "trictrac" simpliciter.

Trictrac à écrire was first fully described in an anonymous pamphlet published by Hungarian János Tamás Trattner, printer and bookseller to the Habsburg monarchy, in Vienna in 1774; this pamphlet was later republished in numerous anthologies as the definitive rules of that game (i.e. trictrac à écrire). Fallavel also makes oblique mention of trictrac à écrire in his 1776 treatise.

Trictrac combiné represents an attempt at compromise between twelve-hole trictrac and trictrac à écrire; save for a few minor particulars, it consists of the vicar's game run on endless loop coterminously with a trictrac à écrire match. Because, in effect, two games are being run on the same board, additional equipment is needed to play: notably, four differently-coloured pegs per player and five neckties in total.

==== Vicar's game ====
The twelve-hole or vicar's game breaks down into elements or events:

- The round (tour) or match (partie entière) is made up of one or more games totalling 12 holes (the peg has to be moved forward by twelve holes to win a match);
- A game (relevé or reprise) = one or more parties. It starts when all men are returned to the talon because:
  - a player "goes" having won a partie; or
  - a player bears off all his men;
- A partie (partie) is when a player scores one or more holes;
- A hole (trou or partie simple) is obtained by scoring twelve points. (Likewise, scoring two holes is a partie double.)

===== Banner or necktie =====
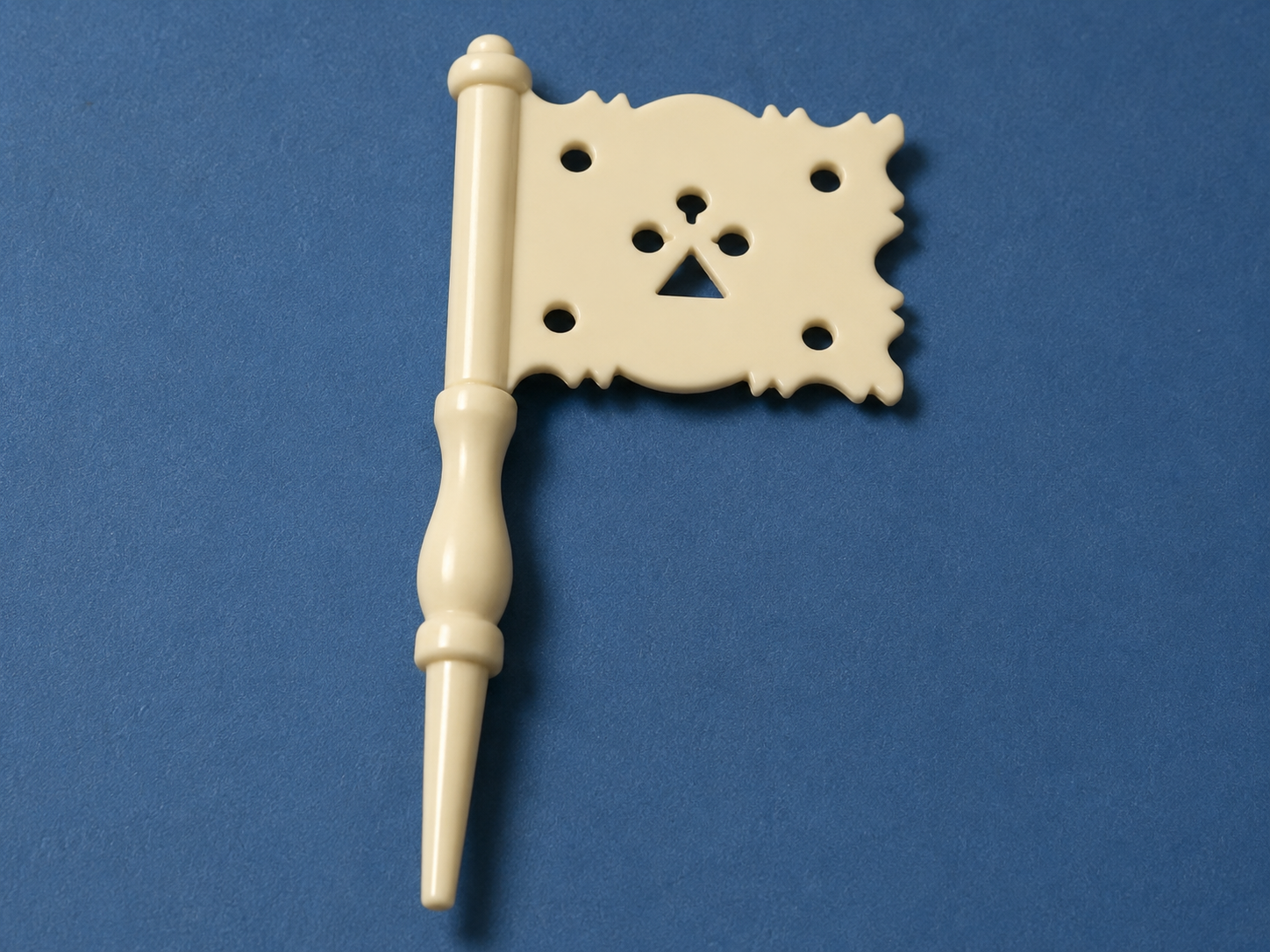
A trictrac banner in plastic with a stylized ermine flecking. It swivels around the shank to prevent breakage.

The 'pavilion' (pavillon) or 'banner' (étendard) is a small flag that plays the same role as the bredouille but for a whole match. At the very beginning of the match, the flag is placed between the two players' pegs on the talon bar.

When a player reaches the twelfth hole without the other having scored a single hole, this is called "winning a match-level lurch" (gagne le tour bredouille) or "winning a grand lurch" (gagner en grande bredouille). If the second player wins a hole before the first reaches the twelfth hole, the first is no longer able to win a grand lurch. However, the second player can now do so. To indicate this, the second player replaces his or her peg with the flag and continues to use it instead of the peg. If the second player reaches 12 holes before the first scores a hole again, the second player wins a grand lurch. But if the first prevents the 12-hole run by scoring a hole, the flag is removed and laid next to the board to indicate that neither player can win a grand lurch in that match.

Instead of a banner, a necktie (cravate) may be used; in this case, the necktie is simply placed around the original peg and travels with it for as long as the grand lurch is in effect. A manufactured necktie comes in the form of a plain washer; in its absence, a pierced scrap of paper or drilled coin can be substituted.

==== Winnings ====
The game is usually played for money and winning a match is valued at a multiple of the stake agreed between the players. The multiplier depends on the scoring scheme chosen:

The oldest:

- winning a normal game is worth a single stake.
- winning a grand lurch pays double;

The second:

- winning a normal game if the opponent has crossed the bridge (passé le pont) (Note: i.e. the opponent has not reached the 7th hole.) pays a single stake.
- winning a normal game if the opponent has not crossed the bridge is worth 1½ times the stake;
- winning a grand lurch pays double;

The last one, described in the 18th century as being played in Austria, spreading to France by the latest in the 19th century:

- winning a normal game if the opponent has reached the sixth hole is worth a single stake;
- winning a normal game if the opponent has not reached the sixth hole pays double;
- winning a grand lurch while in possession of the flag pays treble;
- winning a grand lurch without having obtained the flag pays quadruple.

This method, known as trictrac with honours (avec les honneurs) is more attractive because it gives the trailing player a chance to reduce the opponent's winnings up to the end. Nowadays, the stake is 1 point and a player's winnings are counted as a number of points depending on the method chosen.

==== Trictrac à écrire ====
Trictrac à écrire is a scoring system rather than a variant. The play itself uses the same point rules as the vicar's game, including the point-level lurch [la bredouille]. What changes is how holes are counted, how the banner is used, and how the agreed marks are settled.

A match is an agreed even number of marks, usually eight or twelve. Score each mark as it ends; settle the whole match after the last mark.

===== Duration =====
Trictrac à écrire takes anywhere from a quarter to three quarters of an hour to play per mark. Eight- or twelve-mark matches are most common, but by no means universal: any even number of marks from six to twenty-four is acceptable.

This implies that a trictrac à écrire series may take anywhere from 90 – 270 minutes for a six-mark series to 360 – 1,080 minutes for a twenty-four-mark series. The distribution skews far more towards the upper end than the lower.

In consideration for such lengths of play, it is not only not unheard of, but in fact routine, to adjourn and resume at a later date—and potentially to do so more than once. It is important to take note of all game state necessary for later resumption.

===== Marks =====
A player wins a mark [marqué] by being the first to reach the sixth hole [trou] on that player's own turn. If Alice reaches the sixth hole on Bob's turn because Bob falsely hits her [battu à faux], Alice must stay in [rester] and play on to the seventh hole. The same rule applies after the sixth: the winning hole must be made on the winner's own die. Earlier holes may be made on either player's die.

Reaching the winning hole is not enough. The winner must then keep the holes already won, pick up the game [lever le jeu], and go [s’en aller].

The loser counts their own holes and pays only the difference. If Alice has six holes and Bob has four, Bob loses by two holes.

Each lost hole is worth one round jeton. The winner also receives two jetons as consolation for the mark. The loser marks the lost mark with a jeton for the final match count.

Example: Alice takes three holes, Bob takes four, and Alice then takes three more. If Alice's last hole is made on her turn, she wins by two holes and marks Bob for two.

===== Obligatory hole =====
Until someone reaches the sixth hole, the obligatory hole [trou d’obligation], a player may pick up and restart from the talon after any hole made on that player's own turn.

Once either player reaches the sixth hole, whether on their own die or the opponent's die, use these rules:

- If the sixth hole is reached on the opponent's turn, the player must hold until making another hole on their own turn.
- If the sixth hole is reached on the player's own turn, the player may either:
  - go at once and secure the mark; or
  - continue in the same holding [tenue], without pickup [sans lever], to try for more holes.

Bearing off the men [sortie des dames] at a new reprise is allowed, but the player may not mark until another hole made on their own turn gives the right to go. Holes after the sixth are unlimited. After the twelfth hole, start the circuit again and keep holding as long as the position looks profitable.

If the opponent interrupts the run with intermediate holes, even in different reprises, those holes reduce the profit but do not stop the mark from being marked. When the player comes back into play, they must continue without pickup.

A player who has not reached six holes may still mark an opponent who has six or more. To do it, the player must overtake the opponent by one hole, and every hole needed to overtake must be made in the same holding, without pickup.

Example: Alice has four holes and Bob has seven. If Alice now takes a hole, she must continue without pickup until she reaches eight holes, one more than Bob. If Bob adds more holes in the meantime, Alice must beat Bob's new total.

A player who has already overtaken the opponent can still lose by pushing too far. If Alice passes Bob at eight holes but keeps going, and Bob then comes back and reaches nine holes without pickup, with the ninth made on Bob's turn, Alice loses the mark she could have won.

===== Do-over =====
A do-over [refait] happens when one player has six or more holes and the other catches up, with the equalising hole made on the catching player's own turn.

If continuing would be dangerous, the catching player may pick up and announce "refait". All holes on both sides are cancelled, the mark starts over, and the consolation is doubled in the proper proportion, whether the mark was ordinary, a petty lurch, or a grand lurch.

===== Conceding the mark =====
A player may concede the mark to avoid a larger loss.

Example: Alice has reached the sixth hole or beyond. Bob already had one hole, then comes back and makes two more, the last on his own turn. Bob cannot pick up, cannot overtake Alice, and risks an enfilade or a large loss if he holds. Bob may go instead, paying Alice the excess holes plus the consolation. Alice must respect this decision.

===== Petty lurch =====
To score a petty lurch [petite bredouille], all of these must be true:

1. The player takes six consecutive holes, with no opponent's hole between them.
2. The first of those holes is the first hole of the trictrac circuit.
3. The hole that ends the mark is made on the player's own turn. If not, the player must continue to the seventh hole, or farther, until a hole is made on their own turn.
4. The player stops with the holes won and picks up the game.

Up to the sixth hole, the player may pick up after any hole made on their own turn. If they have used that right, the result is a petty lurch with pickup [petite bredouille avec relevé]. If they have not picked up from the first hole through the mark-ending hole, the result is a petty lurch without pickup [petite bredouille sans lever]. Forced holdings caused by false hits [battu à faux] still count as without pickup.

(Note on avec relevé: in trictrac à écrire, a mark [marqué] is won with pickup [avec relevé] when the player has not held throughout and has picked up their men [levé ses dames].)

In a petty lurch with pickup, each hole is worth two jetons and the consolation is doubled. Six holes plus consolation are worth sixteen jetons.

In a petty lurch without pickup, each hole is worth three jetons and the consolation is trebled. Six holes give eighteen jetons, plus six for consolation, for a total of twenty-four.

A petty lurch can be made in arrears [en dernier], after the opponent has already taken holes. Example: Bob has five holes. Alice comes in and makes seven holes under petty-lurch conditions. Alice counts eighteen jetons with pickup or twenty-seven without pickup, but Bob deducts five jetons for the holes he had already taken.

A petty lurch can be carried as far as the eleventh hole of the board [trictrac], inclusive. With pickup, eleven holes are worth twenty-two jetons plus four consolation, for twenty-six total. Without pickup, they are worth thirty-nine total. In arrears, deduct one jeton for each hole the opponent had already taken.

In any petty lurch carried beyond six holes, whether in advance [en premier] or in arrears, every hole from the sixth onward, including the sixth, must be made in the same holding.

A player can lose the petty lurch by pushing too far. Suppose Bob reaches the sixth hole, but keeps holding for a richer result. If Alice then wins a single hole, on either player's turn, and Bob later comes back into play, Bob's first six holes count only as single holes. If Bob eventually has ten holes with that interruption, he is paid only ten jetons, minus Alice's intermediate holes.

The same limit applies to a conceded mark [marqué volontaire]. If Alice interrupts Bob's sequence with one or more holes, then stops to avoid a worse loss, she pays only the simple excess of holes and the consolation at the single rate.

A player who already has a petty lurch but keeps going may suffer one in return [l’essuyer]. Alice must surpass Bob by one hole: if Bob has six holes, Alice must reach seven; if Bob has eight, Alice must reach nine. Since Bob has reached the obligatory hole, Alice's holes must be made from the first hole in the same holding, without pickup. Bob's holes count only as single holes and are deducted from what he owes.

A petty lurch in arrears after a failed petty lurch in advance must be made without pickup. Its value is based on what the first player's lurch would have been worth: double if the first player's holes were made with pickup, and treble if they were made in one holding.

The same rule applies if Bob reached the sixth hole only because he was falsely hit, or if Bob reached later holes from the sixth onward on Alice's die and needed only a hole on his own turn to go. Alice must surpass Bob without pickup, and her petty lurch is double or treble according to whether Bob's holes were made with or without pickup.

Both players can lose their petty lurches by overreaching. Suppose Bob takes eight consecutive holes. Alice enters and takes nine uninterrupted holes. Bob then comes back and makes only two more, bringing himself to ten. Bob marks Alice for one single hole. Both petty lurches are ignored.

If Alice reaches the eighth hole and is tied with Bob but cannot safely surpass him, she may call a do-over instead. The whole mark is annulled.

===== Grand lurch =====
A grand lurch [grande bredouille] requires twelve uninterrupted holes, beginning with the first hole of the board. From the sixth hole onward, all holes must be made in the same holding, except for bearing off at the jan de retour. The last hole must be made on the winner's turn. If it is made on the opponent's turn, the player must continue to the thirteenth hole, or farther, until a hole is made on their own turn. Then the player must go.

Because the grand lurch requires no pickup only from the sixth hole onward, a player may pick up after any of the first five holes made on their own turn. A grand lurch can therefore be made with pickup or without pickup.

In a grand lurch with pickup, holes and consolation are counted quadruple. Twelve holes give forty-eight jetons, plus eight consolation, for a total of fifty-six.

In a grand lurch without pickup, holes and consolation are counted fivefold. Twelve holes give sixty jetons, plus ten consolation, for a total of seventy. The rate is fivefold, not sixfold.

After taking the twelfth hole on her own turn, Alice may keep the same holding and begin the circuit again if the position is still strong. When she stops, Bob pays for all Alice's holes at the grand-lurch rate. Twenty holes with pickup are worth eighty-eight jetons; twenty holes without pickup are worth one hundred and ten.

If Bob makes even one hole after Alice has taken twelve or more holes, whether on Bob's turn or Alice's, Alice loses the grand lurch. All her holes, before and after Bob's hole, count only single.

A grand lurch, like a petty lurch, can be made in arrears, with or without pickup. The opponent's earlier holes are deducted.

If the opponent has already reached the sixth hole or beyond, a grand lurch in arrears must be made from the first hole without interruption and in the same holding.

Even then, the grand lurch in arrears is fivefold only if the first player's holes up to the sixth hole, or beyond, were made without pickup. If the first player had picked up, the later grand lurch is only quadruple.

A grand lurch can also be made against a player who has already reached twelve holes and keeps going. Suppose Alice reaches the fourteenth hole. Bob then makes a hole and continues without interruption and without pickup to the fifteenth, surpassing Alice. Alice's fourteen holes count only single. After deducting those fourteen jetons, Alice pays Bob's holes at the quadruple or fivefold rate, according to Alice's missed grand lurch. The consolation uses the same rate.

Sometimes, especially in the jans de retour, a player takes the twelfth hole on the opponent's turn and therefore cannot pick up to mark the grand lurch. The run may continue for several holes, after which the opponent may enter and make a grand lurch. Treat this like the previous case: the later player must surpass the earlier player in the same holding, and the lurch's value is based on what the earlier player's grand lurch would have been worth.

The rule for two failed petty lurches also applies to two failed grand lurches: the mark may be won only as a single mark, even if each player in turn might have marked a grand lurch.

Conceded marks and do-overs work the same way for grand lurches as for petty lurches. On a conceded mark after interruption, the winner receives only the simple excess of holes. On a do-over, when the first grand lurch has failed and the second player cannot safely make the hole needed to surpass, equality of holes supplies the compensation.

===== The necktie and the banner =====
A petty or grand lurch in advance with pickup needs no special marker. The opponent has no holes, so the situation is clear when the player takes the first hole and later picks up to go.

A petty or grand lurch in advance without pickup is marked with the banner [étendard]. From the first hole, place the banner on the talon side in one of the board holes [tablier] used for marking games won. It does not matter whether the player is holding voluntarily or is forced to hold by a false hit.

Keep the banner until the end of the mark as long as the opponent does not interrupt and the player continues without pickup. Bearing off at a new reprise does not break it. If the player picks up without being interrupted, remove the banner but keep the right to a lurch with pickup. If the opponent interrupts, remove the banner and give up the lurch.

When a player interrupts the opponent and claims a later lurch with pickup, mark it with the necktie [cravate]. Attach it to the peg from that player's first hole. Remove it as soon as that player is interrupted in turn. If it remains until the mark ends, the lurch with pickup is established.

The necktie was formerly also called the ruff [fraise]. A stainless-steel washer or drilled coin works; the hole only has to fit the peg. If using a coin, use one that matches the coinage used for the point tokens and the point-level lurch marker [la bredouille]. If one doesn't have a washer or drilled coin, a pierced piece of paper is a suitable field expedient; some players prefer this method, despite its inelegance, because the paper travels with the peg.

If the player who interrupted the opponent does not pick up at the first hole, that player takes both the necktie and the banner. Keep both until the mark-ending hole, as long as there is no interruption and no pickup. If the player picks up without being interrupted, remove only the banner. If the player is interrupted, remove both the necktie and the banner, since the lurch is no longer possible.

In the exceptional cases where a later lurch's value is fixed by an earlier missed lurch, the player takes only the necktie.

A player who fails to take the banner or necktie from the first hole cannot claim it later.

===== Match settlement =====
A match of Trictrac à écrire uses an agreed even number of marks, commonly eight or twelve. Half the total number of marks is called complete [complet].

After losing a mark and paying the jetons due for holes, whether single, petty lurch, or grand lurch, the loser marks that mark with a jeton. The box holding the fish [fiches] separates the players' lost-mark jetons. Each player places jetons on the side of the box facing them, in rows of three.

At the end of the match, count each player's lost marks. The player marked more than complete, and therefore marked more often than the opponent, pays four jetons for each excess lost mark.

Example: in a twelve-mark match, Bob is marked (i.e. loses – derived from the French verb marquer) seven times and Alice five times. Bob is marked two marks more than Alice, so he pays Alice eight jetons.

These excess marks are called paris. The terms postilion [postillon] and Swiss [Suisse] refer to marks marked beyond complete. One postilion equals two paris.

In addition to the four jetons per pari, the player marked for more marks pays twenty jetons as the queue of paris.

If both players lose the same number of marks, each is only complete. No paris and no queue of paris are paid.

Each player's starting stake [prise] is twenty jetons.

A player who loses beyond their stake pays the surplus in fish drawn from the box. One fish is worth ten jetons. If Alice has won fish and then starts losing, she pays Bob by returning won fish to the box. If she owes more fish than she has won, for example four fish while holding only one, she returns that one fish and draws three more to settle the rest. The box, first charged to Bob, then passes to Alice; it may pass back again before the match ends.

When the match ends, first determine which player wins jetons from the other. That player takes the lost-mark marker jetons placed on both sides of the box: twelve in a twelve-mark match. If the players are equal, they split these jetons; this is the queue of jetons. For example, equality exists if each player has fourteen jetons left, or if one has one fish and four jetons while the other has twenty-four jetons, since exchanging and returning the fish leaves fourteen jetons each.

Only after that do the players settle the paris. The loser pays four jetons per pari plus twenty jetons for the queue of paris. Thus two paris, or one postilion, cost twenty-eight jetons; four paris cost thirty-six; six paris cost forty-four; and each additional postilion adds eight jetons.

Do not settle the paris before deciding the queue of jetons. Otherwise the queue of paris can wrongly affect the queue of jetons, to which the player winning the paris has no claim.

For easier end scoring, players may price the game by fish instead of by jetons. For example, one fish may be worth 100€. If the loser has six jetons left from the twenty-jeton stake, those six jetons count as a whole fish in that player's favour. If the loser has only four jetons left, they do not count; the player is treated as having lost the full twenty jetons, or two fish. Five jetons are decided double-or-nothing on the highest die.

===== Scoring with paper and pencil =====
Players may score without jetons and fish by writing each player's losses in two columns. After the agreed marks are played, add each column. To the column of the player who lost more jetons, add one jeton for each mark for which that player was marked. If the paris are unequal, add the lost paris and their queue to the column of the player who lost the paris. Subtract the smaller total from the larger. The remainder is the true loss in jetons; divide by ten to convert it to fish.

The following example shows how to score without jetons:

Marks		Points won	
	Nº of do-overs	Alice	Bob
1		21	
2		8	
3	1		31
4		25	
5	2		28
6		4	
Total (I)		58	59
Queue of jetons (II)			4
Settlement of paris
Paris (III)		16	8
Queue of paris (IV)		20	
Final result
I + II + III + IV		94	71
Gross		23	
Net		20	

Each player leads first on alternate marks. If Alice leads the first mark, she leads every odd-numbered mark. Bob leads every even-numbered mark.

If the match must be postponed, record the essential state like this:

	Paris	Jetons	Fish	Turn
Alice	3	15	7	
Bob	5	17	0	⬅︎

==== Trictrac combiné ====
===== Nature of the game =====
Trictrac combiné combines two games at once: Trictrac à écrire and twelve-hole trictrac with honours [Trictrac à la partie]. A hole [trou] usually counts for both games at the same time, but the two scores stay separate.

The two games often reward different decisions. When they do, a player may suspend one game and keep playing the other.

Use the rules of Trictrac à écrire above, including the higher payment for lurches made without pickup: a petty lurch [petite bredouille] is treble if made in the same holding [tenue] and double if made after pickup [relevé]; a grand lurch [grande bredouille] is worth five jetons per hole without pickup and four jetons per hole with pickup.

Twelve-hole trictrac with honours [avec les honneurs] can be won single, double, treble, or quadruple:

- Single: the winner reaches the twelfth hole after the opponent has passed the sixth.
- Double: the winner reaches the twelfth hole while the opponent has no more than six holes.
- Treble: the player who takes holes second reaches the twelfth without being interrupted by any new hole from the opponent.
- Quadruple: one player makes all twelve holes before the opponent takes any.

Continuation is added to the twelve-hole game. Without continuation, the twelfth hole ends the game: the winner must pick up and go, and any surplus hole from the same throw is ignored. With continuation, the twelfth hole still wins the honours game, but what happens next depends on whose die made it:

- If the twelfth hole is made on the winner's own turn, the winner may pick up and go, or may continue without pickup if the position is good.
- If the twelfth hole is made on the opponent's turn, the winner must stay in, no matter how risky the position looks.

Holes beyond the twelfth count toward the next honours game. If the winning throw also makes one extra hole, that extra hole becomes the first hole of the next honours game.

===== Suspending one game =====
When one game should be protected and the other should be pushed, suspend the game you want to protect. While a game is suspended, play affects only the continuing game. The suspended game keeps its hole count and its current prospects, including rights to double, treble, quadruple, petty lurch, or grand lurch.

A player may suspend a game only after making a hole on their own turn, at a moment when that player would otherwise be allowed to pick up and go. The player is treated as having gone for the suspended game, but remains in the same holding for the continuing game.

A suspension lasts until the first pickup [relevé] by either player after a hole made on that player's own turn. Bearing off the men [sortie des dames] in the return game [jeu de retour] does not count as a pickup.

Suspending Trictrac à écrire has two cases:

1. If the player has reached the sixth hole or beyond, score the à écrire mark at once. Pay the holes, whether single, petty lurch, or grand lurch, and have the opponent mark the lost mark. The rest of the holding affects only the honours game.
2. If the player has fewer than six holes, freeze the à écrire mark where it stands. Any right to a petty lurch is preserved, but it can pay only double: treble requires no pickup through the hole that ends the mark, and suspending à écrire counts as having gone.

Suspending the honours game has only one effect: it freezes exactly where it stands.

The pool [poule] belongs only to the honours game. Its rules are given below.

If a player scores the à écrire mark but keeps playing the honours game, that player stays at the board until the next pickup, then gives way to their partner. With more than two players, the dice belong to the player who remains at the board. With two players, the dice alternate as in Trictrac à écrire.

===== Pegs and equipment =====
Because the two games can drift apart, each player needs separate pegs [fichets]:

- a gold peg for Trictrac à écrire;
- a silver peg for the honours game;
- a bimetallic peg [fichet bimétallique] for holes that count for both games at once;
- a black peg for a suspended game.

Use the bimetallic peg whenever the same hole belongs to both games. Keep using it while the two games have the same hole count. Once one game ends, continues alone, or is suspended, replace it with the proper single-game peg.

Example: Alice reaches the sixth hole on her own turn and marks Bob in Trictrac à écrire. The à écrire mark is over, but the honours game is only at the sixth hole. Replace the bimetallic peg with the silver honours peg at the sixth hole. Alice's next hole is the seventh hole of the honours game and the first hole of the next à écrire mark.

When Alice moves the silver peg from the sixth hole to the seventh, the gold peg marks the first hole of the new à écrire mark. The games now advance six holes apart until another ending or suspension changes the gap.

Example continued: Alice marked Bob at the sixth hole. In the next à écrire mark, she marks him at the eighth hole. When that mark reached its sixth hole, the honours game reached its twelfth and ended. The seventh hole of the second à écrire mark became the first hole of the second honours game, and the eighth hole became the second. Alice's first new hole in the third à écrire mark is therefore also the third hole of the second honours game. The honours game now leads by two holes, not six.

If Bob then takes a hole while having no holes in either game, he takes the bimetallic peg. If he makes twelve holes without interruption, he wins the honours game treble and the à écrire game by grand lurch. The bimetallic peg serves through the twelfth hole, the last hole of both games. Since Alice's holes in both games are erased and Bob has no remaining holes in either game, the next mark also begins with the bimetallic peg.

The black peg marks a suspended game. Remove the suspended game's normal peg and put the black peg in that hole. The black peg records the suspended game's state for both players.

If the à écrire mark has already been scored and only the honours game continues, remove the à écrire peg entirely. That mark is not suspended; it is finished, and the next à écrire mark starts after the next pickup. To show this, put the black peg in the last hole on the resting-corner side [coin de repos]. Then mark only the honours game and leave the black peg still.

Sometimes the player who wants to suspend a game has the bimetallic peg, or the opponent has it. The bimetallic peg cannot be exchanged until the player who owns it makes a new hole. For the short interval before that happens, place the suspended game's peg in the hole immediately before the bimetallic peg. When the continuing game next makes a hole, remove both the bimetallic peg and the suspended-game peg. Replace the bimetallic peg with the black peg for the suspended game, and use the continuing game's peg to mark the new hole. The black peg stays put until a pickup brings the suspended game back.

One more case matters. Suppose the suspended game is farther advanced than the continuing game, and the continuing game catches up to the black peg. Example: Bob has three holes in the honours game and five in Trictrac à écrire. He suspends à écrire. Soon after, he takes two honours holes and reaches the fifth hole, where the black peg already sits.

While the two games share that hole, replace the black peg with the bimetallic peg and place the suspended game's peg in the previous hole. As soon as the continuing game advances again, use its own peg for the new hole, put the black peg back where the suspended game remains, and remove the temporary suspended-game peg.

===== Banner and necktie in trictrac combiné =====
The banner [étendard] marks a petty or grand lurch made in the same holding, without pickup from the first hole of the mark to the mark-ending hole. After the first hole, if the player chooses or is forced to hold, place the banner in a side-rail hole on the talon side. Keep it there while the player continues without pickup. If the player picks up after a later hole, remove the banner and give up the higher no-pickup rate.

Place the banner immediately after the first hole and before the next dice throw. A player who misses that moment cannot claim the banner later.

The necktie [cravate] is a pierced counter that fits over a peg. It serves both games:

- In Trictrac à écrire, it marks the right to a lurch in arrears [petite bredouille en dernier].
- In the honours game, it marks the right to win treble.

Attach the necktie to the peg immediately after the first hole. Keep it there until the opponent makes a new hole. If the necktie remains on the peg through the twelfth hole of the honours game, the honours game is won treble. If it remains through the final hole of a petty or grand lurch in Trictrac à écrire, the lurch pays two or four jetons per hole, unless the banner was also kept from the first hole; with the banner, the lurch pays treble or fivefold.

The necktie can sit on any of the four pegs. Use these cases as guides:

- If Alice has the bimetallic peg and Bob, who has no holes, takes his first hole second, Bob attaches the necktie to the bimetallic peg. It counts for both games. The same applies if Alice has separate gold and silver pegs but no necktie, and Bob has no holes.
- If Alice begins a new à écrire mark while also having three holes in the honours game, and Bob makes the first hole of the new mark, Bob takes the bimetallic peg with the necktie. The necktie counts only for the honours game, where it marks the treble. It does not count for Trictrac à écrire, because Bob's lurch there would be in advance [bredouille en premier].
- Suppose Alice has three honours holes and no à écrire holes, while Bob has the bimetallic peg with the necktie. If Alice makes a new hole that counts for both games, Bob's necktie comes off because Alice has interrupted his treble in the honours game. Alice now takes the necktie for Trictrac à écrire, because she is aiming at a lurch in arrears [en second = en dernier]. Bob's bimetallic peg now represents only simple holes, though he may still win the honours game double if Alice does not reach the seventh hole.
- Two neckties may be in use at once. Suppose Alice and Bob have both begun the honours game, and Bob has the necktie. Bob makes the first hole of a new à écrire mark and suspends the honours game to protect his necktie. Alice then takes a hole in the continuing à écrire game. Since Bob already has a hole there, Alice must take the necktie for à écrire. Bob keeps one necktie on the black peg for the suspended honours game; Alice uses the other for the continuing à écrire game.
- The same player may need two neckties. Suppose Alice has seven holes with the bimetallic peg, and Bob has two with the bimetallic peg plus the necktie, giving him the right to the honours treble and the à écrire lurch in arrears. Bob suspends the honours game by placing the honours peg in the hole before the bimetallic peg. When Bob later wins a new hole in the continuing à écrire game, replace the bimetallic peg with the black peg, remove the honours peg, and mark à écrire with its proper peg. Because Bob still preserves the necktie right in both games, attach one necktie to each peg.

For Trictrac combiné, have these pieces ready: four pegs for each player, one banner, five neckties, forty jetons, one box of fish for Trictrac à écrire, two boxes of different colours for the honours game, and a basket for the pool.

For convenience, keep the four pegs in side-rail holes on the talon side. Put the banner on the opposite rail so it is visible. Keep the jetons and honours boxes on the talon side; keep the à écrire box and the pool basket on the resting-corner side.

If a game is postponed, record the state like this:

	Trictrac à écrire			Trictrac with honours		Pool
	Paris	Fish	Jetons	Holes	Fish	Fish
Alice	3	6	18	4	7	12
Bob	5			5 (Necktie)		5
Total						17
Alice is at the pool; Bob has the dice. Game length 12 marks.

===== The pool =====
The pool [poule] concerns only the honours game.

At the start, each player puts two stake fish [fiches d’enjeu] into the basket. Whenever an honours game is lost, it is paid single, double, treble, or quadruple both to the winner and to the basket.

A player draws the pool by winning two honours games in a row.

After winning an honours game, place a contract marker [contrat] of that player's fish colour in front of the basket. If the same player wins the next honours game, that player takes the pool. If the opponent wins instead, remove the first marker and place the opponent's marker by the basket.

The pool keeps growing until someone wins two consecutive honours games. When the pool is drawn, begin a new pool with a renewed stake.

Because the honours game must end with the Trictrac à écrire match, do not begin a new pool during the last mark. This does not prevent a pool from being opened with the first mark; that opening pool belongs to the player who wins that game.

If a pool begun earlier ends during the last mark, and the winner of the last game was not already marked at the pool, the two players have equal rights to it. Divide the pool; if the number of fish is odd, the winner of the last game takes the larger half. If the pool had only just begun, it belongs to the winning basket and contains only the simple stake.

===== Example progression =====
This three-mark example shows how the pegs move. Follow it on a board, moving the pegs as listed. Not every special case appears; use the rules above for the missing cases.

The gold peg marks Trictrac à écrire. The silver peg marks the honours game.

First mark. Alice and Bob each put two stake fish, taken from the honours box, into the pool. Alice takes one hole with the bimetallic peg and goes. Bob takes two holes with the bimetallic peg, takes the necktie, and goes. Alice takes three holes and moves her peg from the first hole to the fourth, then goes. Bob gives up the necktie. Bob makes two holes; his peg occupies the fourth hole, and he substitutes the silver peg there. Alice takes two holes, reaches the sixth, marks, and substitutes the silver peg for the bimetallic peg at the sixth hole.

Second mark. Alice takes two holes with the gold peg, takes the banner, and moves the silver peg from the sixth to the eighth hole. Alice takes another hole with the gold peg, reaching the third, and moves the silver peg to the ninth. Bob takes two holes with the gold peg, reaches the fourth, gives up the banner, and goes; with the silver peg he reaches the eighth hole. Bob takes two holes with the gold peg, takes the necktie, removes Alice's banner in order to take it himself, and moves the silver peg from the fourth to the sixth hole. Alice takes two holes with the gold peg, moving it from the third hole to the fifth; the silver peg goes to the eleventh. Bob gives up the necktie. Alice takes two holes with the gold peg, reaches the seventh, marks, and suspends Trictrac à écrire; the silver peg passes from the eleventh hole to the first. Alice wins the honours game, places her contract marker by the pool, and places the black peg in the last hole to show that Trictrac à écrire is suspended. Bob withdraws his two pegs. Alice makes four holes in the honours game, reaches the fifth hole, and picks up. The two games begin together again in the next mark.

Third mark. Bob makes one hole with the bimetallic peg and takes the banner and the necktie. Alice makes two holes with the gold peg and takes the necktie and the banner; the silver peg moves from the fifth to the seventh hole. Bob gives up the necktie. Alice takes two holes with the gold peg, reaching the fourth, while the silver peg reaches the ninth; she goes and gives up the banner. Alice takes three holes with the gold peg, reaching the seventh, and the silver peg reaches the last hole. She wins the honours game single, draws the pool, goes, and marks. Bob picks up the bimetallic peg.

=== Multi-player trictrac ===
==== Multi-player vicar's game ====
Trictrac can be played in a pool [poule]. There are two ways of playing with a pool, by filling it [engraisser la poule] or by draining it [plumer la poule]. These are separate variants with different strategies. Trictrac, though a game of skill, is normally played for money; these rules, in particular, have been devised with stakes in mind. (Humorously, the French terms are barnyard puns—poule is also the word for the hen. A similar effect is here obtained by analogy with the other kind of pool.)

===== Filling the pool =====
An unlimited number of players may play this variation. It is most often played, however, where there is a number of players with only one board between them—or when high-stakes betting is the order of the day. Winnings, as well as playing time, are theoretically unlimited.

Lots are drawn for order of play. Thereafter, each player antes up a pre-agreed amount. Matches are then played, to six holes, against the first in line by the second, third, and so on. A player who defeats the first in line becomes, in turn, the first in line. A defeated player must yield his place and ante up again, joining the tail of the line. A player who wins against all of his opponents in succession is reckoned the winner of the tournament. When playing this pool-filling variation of trictrac, there is significant financial advantage to be gained by being last in line, because this place minimises downside exposure.

Example: Alice, Bob, Charlie, Daniel, and Erin play the filling game for an ante of £200, leaving the pot at £1000. They draw lots, yielding the order Charlie, Erin, Daniel, Alice, Bob. Charlie wins against Erin, who must ante £200 again—filling the pot to £1200—and Erin gets behind Bob. Charlie then loses against Daniel. Daniel takes Charlie's old seat (facing Alice next). Charlie must then ante £200, filling the pot to £1400, and get behind Erin. Daniel then wins against Alice, then Bob, then Erin, then Charlie, walking off with £2200 in total.

Suppose now that Alice, having beaten Daniel and Bob, also wins her matches against Charlie and Erin. She will have obviously won the tournament and thus the jackpot; it is equally obvious, though, that Bob will only have lost £200, because he will have anted but once, while Charlie and Erin will have lost £400 each, because they will have paid once to rejoin the queue.

===== Draining the pool =====
This variant caps the possible winnings as well as the total playing time; thus, it is well suited to a social setting where conversation takes priority over play (a long run of good luck leads to having to wait one's turn for play—if this space can be filled with something else, all the better). When playing trictrac with a draining pool, each player draws lots for order and, by agreement, the total is determined at the outset; each player then bets an equal portion of this to form the pot. By agreement is also the question of whether or not grand lurch is in effect. In the draining-pool game, winnings are per hole and fixed at five per cent of the total.

The number of holes, on the other hand, is variable. It can be no fewer than six; but it can be as great as the players' estimation of their chances of winning. One may hold on for twelve, twenty, or even thirty holes so long as one's luck holds. Winnings are in terms of the difference between hole scores (multiplied by the five per cent rate given above). The match continues until the pool is drained completely.

When playing the draining game, there is pecuniary advantage to being first in line, because if there is money left over after having gone one, two, or three complete rounds, the first has a greater chance of getting the remainder than the last.

Example: Alice, Bob, Charlie, and Daniel play the draining game, with the order chosen being Bob, Charlie, Alice, Daniel. Suppose that Bob wins ten holes and then goes, with Charlie having won four. If Bob's holes are not in grand lurch (i.e., in uninterrupted or once-interrupted sequence), Bob wins six holes. If Bob's holes are in grand lurch, they are reckoned double, i.e. 10 × 2 = 20 holes. Either way, Charlie's four are subtracted from the result, yielding two in the former case (2 × 5 = 10% of the total) and sixteen in the latter case (i.e., 16 × 5 = 80% of the total). The next matchups are between Charlie and Alice, then between the loser and Daniel, then between the third-game loser and Bob, so long as the depth of the pool does not reach zero.

==== Multi-player trictrac à écrire or combiné ====
For trictrac à écrire, with three players, use either chouette or round robin.

In chouette, one player plays against the other two. The two partners share one bank and play together against the chouette. They alternate two marks in a row against the chouette, while the chouette plays every mark. In a twelve-mark match, each partner picks up the men [relevé] three times. The chouette has the die on all odd-numbered marks.

In round robin [à la ronde], all three players have separate interests: Alice with Bob, Bob with Charlie, Charlie with Alice, then repeat.

A round-robin match [partie à tourner] must have a number of marks divisible by three. Nine and twelve marks both work. Each player plays the same number of marks: six marks in a nine-mark match, and eight in a twelve-mark match.

Complete is defined as one-third of the number of marks rather than one-half. It logically follows that if all three players are marked equally at the end, for example four marks each in a twelve-mark match, all are exactly complete. No paris and no queue of paris are paid.

When the paris are unequal, use the following patterns.

One player may be exactly complete. In a twelve-mark match where each player plays eight marks:

- Alice is marked for 2 marks, 2 short of complete
- Bob is marked for 4 marks, complete
- Charlie is marked for 6 marks, or 2 postilions
- Total: 12 marks

Bob neither wins nor loses paris: he has been marked as many times as he has marked the others. Charlie has been marked six times but has marked only twice, so he loses four paris to Alice, who has been marked only twice but has marked six times. Those four paris plus their queue are worth thirty-six jetons to Alice.

Two players may lose the paris:

- Alice is marked for 1 mark, 3 short of complete
- Bob is marked for 5 marks, or 1 postilion
- Charlie is marked for 6 marks, or 2 postilions
- Total: 12 marks

Alice has been marked only once but has marked seven times, giving her six paris. Bob loses two paris, worth eight jetons, because he is marked five times and has marked only three. Charlie loses four paris, worth sixteen jetons, because he is marked six times and has marked only twice. Bob and Charlie also split the twenty-jeton queue of paris, ten each. Alice receives eighteen jetons from Bob and twenty-six from Charlie, for forty-four total.

If Alice had been marked for two marks while Bob and Charlie were each marked for five, Bob and Charlie would each lose two paris to Alice. Alice would receive eighteen jetons from each, for thirty-six total.

Only one player may lose the paris:

- Alice is marked for 8 marks, or 4 postilions
- Bob is marked for 1 mark, 3 short of complete
- Charlie is marked for 3 marks, 1 short of complete
- Total: 12 marks

Alice has been marked in all eight marks she played, so she loses eight paris. Six go to Bob, who is marked once and has marked seven times; those six paris are worth twenty-four jetons. The other two go to Charlie, who is marked three times and has marked five; those two paris are worth eight jetons. Alice also pays the twenty-jeton queue of paris, split between Bob and Charlie. Alice loses fifty-two jetons total: thirty-four to Bob and eighteen to Charlie.

If Bob and Charlie were marked equally, two marks each, Alice's eight lost paris would be split equally. Bob and Charlie would each receive twenty-six jetons.

To choose the starting players, each of the three players rolls one die. If Alice rolls five, Bob three, and Charlie two, Alice begins with Bob, and Alice has the first move because her die is higher than Bob's.

After each mark, the player who was marked stays in and plays the idle player. The other active player sits out. The player who stays in always has the first turn. The player who marked the first mark, and therefore left the game, finishes the match with the player who did not play the first mark.

The idle player may advise against whichever active player is less marked.

At each mark, the loser pays the consolation, in all its proportions, both to the player who marked them and to the idle third player.

For three players, two stakes of twenty jetons and two boxes of different colours are enough. The two players in the first mark take jetons. The third player has no jeton stake and uses a box, drawing fish from it if they lose. During the match, the boxes pass from player to player as in the two-player game. If the player without a jeton stake ends with jetons, those jetons are winnings or reduce that player's loss.

If the match is postponed, record the state like this:

Alice without stake in jetons. 4 paris, 5 jetons.
Bob from Alice: 1 pari, 21 jetons, 8 fish
    from Charlie: 2 fish
Charlie 4 paris, 5 jetons
Charlie continues with Bob

With four players, play two against two. Each partnership counts as one player, and the two-player rules apply.

The two highest dice decide the starting players, as in the round-robin format. The marked player stays in and plays the second opponent. Example order:

Team A: Alice and Bob
Team B: Charlie and Daniel

Alice begins with Charlie
Alice is marked, and continues with Daniel
Daniel plays with Bob
Bob plays with Charlie
Charlie plays with Alice
Alice plays with Daniel, etc.

(Play follows four-handed piquet.)

Charlie marked Alice in the first mark and therefore sat out; by the same rotation, he must finish the match with Bob, who did not play the first mark.

Trictrac combiné may be played head to head, two against two, or two against the chouette. It cannot be played round-robin [à tourner].

With partners or chouette, players pick up from the game in the same order as in Trictrac à écrire. Completed à écrire marks decide who leaves the board; the honours game does not. A player entering for a partner inherits any honours game already in progress.

== Computer trictrac ==
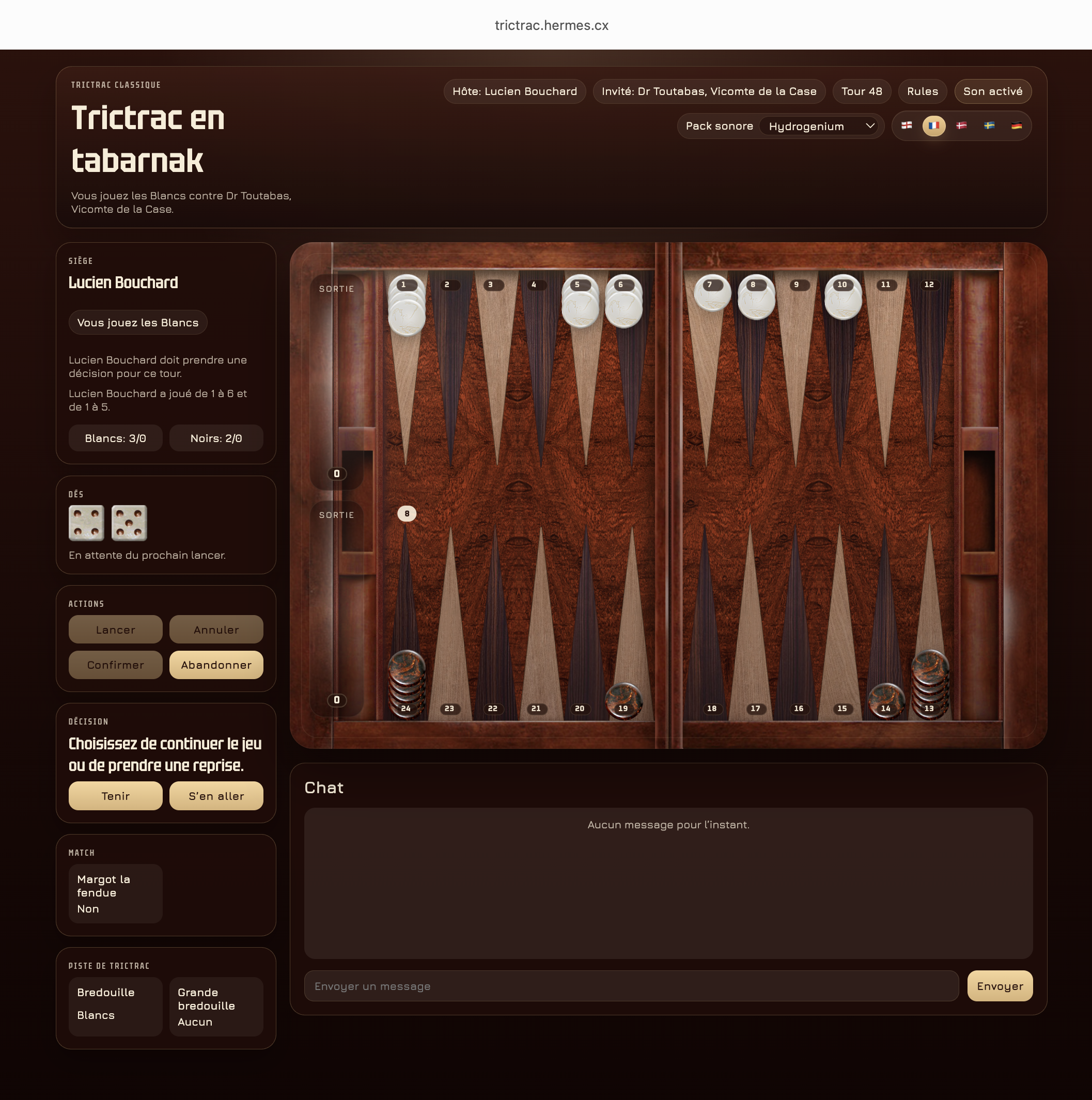
An online trictrac session between Lucien Bouchard and Dr Toutabas, Vicomte de la Case. Bouchard has just reached a set of 12 points, making a hole, and is now presented with the choice to hold on or to go (tenir or s'en aller).

As with most games in the Tables family, trictrac is a game that lends itself well to computer and mobile implementations; as such, multiple trictrac video games have been released for platforms including Android, Windows, and Web, from May 1998 to May 2026. Nevertheless, the fact of trictrac having been computerised results in changes to play simply by the very nature of video games generally; the rationale to this is tantamount to cribbage, which has likewise had many computer and mobile adaptations.

In over-the-board trictrac as in over-the-board cribbage, procedural errors (for example, illegal moves and incorrect scoring) are mitigated by the award of penalties to one's opponent (i.e. sending him to school). Computer games have the option of rejecting illegal moves entirely and tallying points without human intervention. In proportional terms, one can expect to score many fewer points (in fact, zero) due to procedural penalties and many more points due to strategic (maximising expected value) and tactical play (one-, two-, or three-move lookahead). Therefore, strategies that foreground the expectation of the opponent miscounting or moving illegally at a given rate become untenable, yielding their place to strategies that account for legal, properly scored moves only.

Conventional artificial intelligence/machine learning methods (such as reinforcement learning) lend themselves well to trictrac, but the subset of methods that assume some other game, even a seemingly similar game such as backgammon or verquere, may be deceptively non-transferable. At least one implementation is broadly based on AlphaZero, assuming a non-binary, differential win structure for training purposes (slightly differing from strict AlphaZero), but adds an "oracle" that it claims helps highlight promising local tactics for the trainer, which would otherwise optimise only for global strategy. By implication, expectiminimax is excluded as such an oracle.

== See also ==
- History of board games
- Tables games
- Backgammon
- Jacquet
- Libro de los juegos – one of the most important documents in the history of board games

== Literature ==
Treatises on trictrac

- de Jollivet, Euverte, sieur de Votilley (1656), L’Excellent Jeu du Tricque-trac, Paris: Jean Promé's widow, revision of the new 1st edn. of 1634). (ed. of 1635, ed. of 1639)

Note: On the title page of the Jean Promé edition, it states "de Jollivet", but on the following page, "Le libraire au reader", only "Monsieur Jollyvet" followed by "Sieur de Votilley".

- _ (1715), Le Jeu du Trictrac, Enrichi de Figures Avec les Jeux du Revertier, du Toute-Table, du Tourne-Case, des Dames Rabattues, du Plain, et du Toc., 3rd revised, corrected and expanded edn. Paris: Henry Charpentier (1st edn. 1698, 2nd edn. 1701).
- [Soumille, Bernard Laurent], Le Grand Trictrac, Giffart, Paris, 1756, edn. identical to the 1st ed. of 1738 at Avignon. (ed. of 1739).
- _, Principes du Jeu de Trictrac, Guillyn, Paris, 1749.
- M. L'Abbé S*** [Soumille, Bernard Laurent], Le Grand Trictrac, Alexandre Giroud, Avignon, 1756, 2nd rev. edn. (1st edn. 1738, Avignon F. Girard & D. Seguin).
- M. L'Abbé S*** [Soumille, Bernard Laurent], Le Grand Trictrac, de Hansy, 1766, reprint of the 1756 edn at Avignon.
- M.J.M.F. [Fallavel], Le Jeu du Trictrac, Nyon, Paris, 1776.
- s.n., Le Trictrac Combiné, s.l., s.d. (c. 1780).
- [Guiton, N.] (1822), Traité Complet du Jeu de Trictrac, 2nd rev. edn., Barrois l’Aîné (1st edn.. 1816).
- [Lepeintre, Pierre-Marie Michel] (1818), Cours Complet de Trictrac avec un Abrégé du Gammon, du Jacquet et du Garanguet., Paris: Guillaume.
- J.L. [Lelasseux-Lafosse, Julien], Le Jeu de Trictrac rendu facile, Ledoyen, Paris, 1852.

Other sources

- _ (1694) Dictionnaire de l’Académie Française, 1st edn.
- _ (1719). Mémoires du cardinal de Retz, Amsterdam: J. Frédéric Bernard et H. du Sauzet. Tome 1, Tome 2 and Tome 3.
- _ (1817). Journal des débats politiques et littéraires of 24 Oct 1817.
- Chambaud, Lewis (1815). A New Dictionary, English and French, and French and English. Vol. 2, Part 2. London: Cadell & Davis, and others.
- Cotton, Charles (1674). The Complete Gamester, London: A.M.
- Faligot, Urbain (2001). Comment jouer au Backgammon, au Jacquet et au Trictrac. 2nd edn. (1st edn. 1998). ISBN 9782732804446
- Fiske, Willard (1905). Chess in Iceland and Icelandic Literature: With Historical Notes on Other Table-Games. Florence: Florentine Typographical Society.
- Féraud, Jean-François (1787–1788). Dictionnaire critique de la langue française, Marseille: J. Mossy.
- Léchalet, Jacques (1987) Le Jacquet, Le Backgammon, Le Tric Trac, Le Solitaire, 2nd edn. (1st edn. 1979), Bornemann. 55 pp. ISBN 9782851820778
- Lhôte, Jean-Marie (1994). Histoire des Jeux de Société. Flammarion. 671 pp. ISBN 9782080109293
- de Monseignat, Charles (1853). Un Chapitre de la Révolution française ou Histoire des journaux en France de 1789 à 1799, Paris: L. Hachette et Cie.
- Montlosier, Comte de (1830). Mémoires de M. le comte de Montlosier, Paris: Dufey.
- Moreau, Célestin (1851). Bibliographie des mazarinades, Paris: J. Renouard et Cie.
- Murray, H. J. R. (2002) [1951]. A History of Board-Games Other Than Chess (Reprint ed.). Oxford: Oxbow Books. ISBN 0-19-827401-7. OCLC 1086243457..
- Nicot, Jean (1606) Thrésor de la langue française, Paris: David Douceur.
- Parlett, David (1999). The Oxford History of Board Games. Oxford: OUP, pp. 75–76 and 86. ISBN 9780192129987
- Sidredoulx, Épiphane (1878). La Friquassée crotestyllonnée. Paris: Librairie des Bibliophiles.
- Tarver, John Charles (1853). The Royal Phraseological English-French, French-English Dictionary. 2nd edn. London: Dulau & Co.
- Willughby, Francis. A Volume of Plaies. (Manuscript in the Middleton collection, University of Nottingham, shelfmark Li 113.) c. 1665–70.
