= Féraud (surname) =

Féraud or Feraud may refer to:

- M. Feraud, a French diplomat of the 18th century who went on a mission to resume official French East India Company contacts with Burma in 1769
- Albert Féraud (1921–2008), a French sculptor
- Anselm Féraud de Glandèves, a bishop in the ancient Diocese of Glandèves (1309 or 1316–1327 or 1328)
- Antoine Féraud, an actor in the 1895 Partie de cartes documentary film
- Daniel Feraud (born 1953), an Argentine fencer
- Hadrien Feraud (1984-), a French jazz-fusion bassist
- Jean-Bertrand Féraud (1759–1795), a deputy killed during the Prairial uprising during the French Revolution
- Jean Desire Feraud, a French vine planter in the Central Otago Wine Region, in New Zealand
- Jean-François Féraud (1725–1807), a French lexicographer (Dictionnaire critique de la langue française)
- J.-L. Féraud (1750–1809), a member of the French Egyptian Institute of Sciences and Arts
- Louis Féraud (1921–1999), a French fashion designer and artist
- Raymond Féraud, a Middle-Ages monk who composed a mythological life of Honoratus, Archbishop of Arles

Fictional characters

- a character in Le Roi d'Yvestot in The Little Theatre of Jean Renoir series
- Gabriel Féraud, a hussard in the 1977 Ridley Scott The Duellists film
