= Féraud de Nice =

Féraud de Nice (c. 970 in Chorges – 1044), was Bishop of Gap, France 1000–1044.
