= Jean-François Féraud =

French Jesuit and grammarian

Jean-François Féraud (17 April 1725 in Marseille – 8 February 1807 in Marseille) was a French Jesuit and grammarian.

== Publications ==
- Nouveau dictionnaire universel des arts et des sciences, français, latin et anglais : contenant la signification des mots de ces trois langues et des termes propres de chaque état et profession : avec l’explication de tout ce que renferment les arts et les sciences traduit de l’anglais de Thomas Dyche, Avignon, Vve Girard, 1756.
- Dictionnaire grammatical de la langue française, Avignon, Vve Girard; Paris, Vincent, 1768.
- Dictionnaire critique de la langue française. Tome premier, A-D, Marseille, Mossy, 1787.
- Dictionnaire critique de la langue française. Tome second, E-N, Marseille, Mossy, 1787.
- Dictionnaire critique de la langue française. Tome troisième, O-Z, Marseille, Mossy, 1788.

== Dictionary available online ==
- Dictionnaire critique de la langue française Marseille, Mossy, 1787-1788; rééd. Niemeyer Verlag, Tübingen, 1994.

== Sources ==
- François-Xavier de Feller, Biographie universelle ou Dictionnaire historique des hommes qui se sont fait un nom, t.4, Lyon, Rolland-Rusand, 1822, p. 537.
- Louis-François Jauffret, Ruche provençale, t.3, Marseille Joseph-François Achard, 1820, 243 p., p. 114-124.
- Joseph-François Michaud, Louis-Gabriel Michaud, Biographie universelle, ancienne et moderne ou, Histoire, par ordre alphabétique de la vie publique et privée de tous les hommes qui se sont fait remarquer par leurs écrits, leurs actions, leurs talents, leurs vertus ou leurs crimes, vol. 13, Paris, Charles Delagrave, 1815, p. 327-8.
