= Brede Mette =

Danish card game

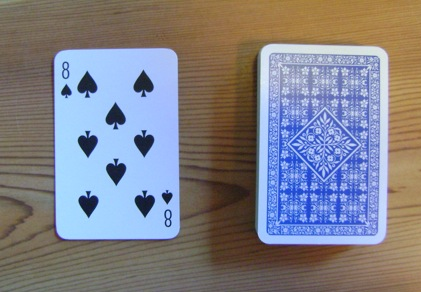
Stock and trump turnup

Brede Mette' or Bræ'e Mæt, is a Danish card game, originating in Funen for 2 or more players. It is reminiscent of the North Jutland game of Rakker. It has been played in Denmark since at least 1950.

== Cards ==
The Jokers are removed from a standard 52-card Danish pattern pack. Aces are high, 2s are low. The highest card is the trump Ace. The Queen of Diamonds cannot be beaten, only passed on or picked up.

== Preliminaries ==
The first dealer is chosen by any agreed means. The dealer shuffles the cards and deals each player 3 cards. The remainder are placed face down as the stock and the top card is turned face up and placed next to it. This upcard determines the trump suit. The cards of the trump suit can beat all the cards of any other suit except ♦Q.

== Play ==
First hand (i.e. the one to the left of the dealer), starts by placing one or more cards of equal rank on the table, e.g. two 5s. If any of the remaining players also have a card of that rank, in this case another 5, it (or they) may be added before second hand (card player) has played. Now second hand must either a) beat the cards played to the table individually (in this case ♥5 and ♣5) or b) holding a card of the same rank, e.g. ♦5, pass the pile of 3 cards back to first hand, or c) beat all 3 cards individually (if wanting, for example, to get rid of more cards). If unable to do any of these, second hand must pick up the card(s) and the turn goes to the next player. Every time a player has less than three cards in hand, more cards must be drawn to get back up to three again. This is done as soon as the number of cards drops below 3 which may occur several times during a turn. If there are not enough cards in stock, the player draws all the remainder.

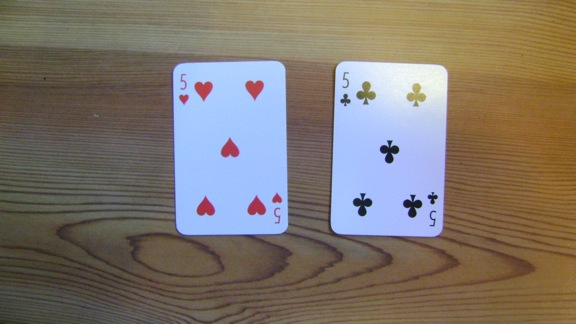
The game's schedule

== Exchanging ==
Exchanging works in this way. Suppose Clubs are trumps and first hand opens by playing ♥Q and ♠Q to the table. If second hand has, say, the ♣2 and ♣J, these trumps may be played on top of the Queens to beat them both individually. Having only one card left, second hand now draws 2 cards from stock and if they turn out to be the ♥K and ♠K, the trumps may be picked up again and the two Kings played on the Queens to beat them. In other words, after drawing fresh cards from the stock a player may choose one or more different cards with which to beat those of the earlier player, picking up those just played.

== Beating ==
To beat one or more cards, a player must either have a card of higher rank or have one that is a trump (however, if the earlier player has played a trump, this must be overtrumped – see illustration).

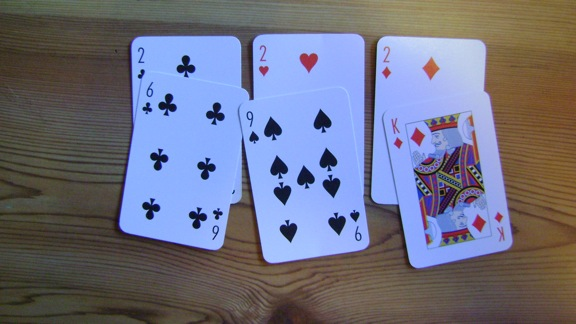
Trick of 3 cards

== Brede Mette ==
Brede Mette is the "Red Queen" (rutter dame or rutter dam) i.e. the ♦Q. She cannot be beaten or trumped, but can be passed on. Whoever ends up with this card at the end of the game is Brede Mette and has lost the game.

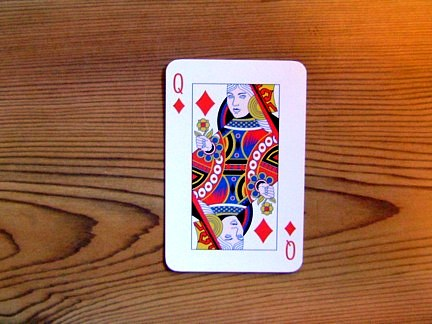
the Brede Mette

== Bibliography ==
- Dedichen, Herman, ed. (1971). Spillefuglen (10. ed.). Politikens Forlag. pp. 127–129.
- Schenkmanis, Ingalil og Ulf (1999). Bogen om kortspil (2. ed.). Aschehoug. pp. 97–98.
