= Spades (suit) =

Playing card suit

- Native name: French: Pique
- Deck: French-suited playing cards
- Invented: 15th century

Spades (♠) (French: Pique) is one of the four playing card suits in the standard French-suited playing cards. It has the same shape as the leaf symbol in German-suited playing cards but its appearance is more akin to that of an upside down black heart with a stalk at its base. It symbolises the pike or halberd, two medieval weapons, but is actually an adaptation of the German suit symbol of Leaves created when French suits were invented around 1480.

In bridge, spades rank as the highest suit. In skat and similar games, it is the second-highest suit.

== Name ==
The word "Spade" is probably derived from the Old Spanish spada meaning "sword" and suggests that Spanish suits were used in England before French suits.

The French name for this suit (pique) means a pike, a kind of spear. In German it is known as Pik. It corresponds to the suit of leaves (Laub, Grün, Schippen or, in Bavaria, Gras) in the German-suited playing cards. In Switzerland, the suit is known as Schuufle ('shovel') and in many German regions, e.g., the Rhineland, as Schüppe/Schippe ('shovel').

== Characteristics ==
The spade symbol is a very stylized spearhead shape, pointing upwards, the bottom widening into two arcs of a circle and sweeping towards the centre to then form a sort of foot.

Generally, spades are black so they can be used in some games as a pair with Clubs (suit), like Klondike (solitaire). They form one of the two major suits in bridge (with hearts). In the official skat tournament deck, spades are green, assuming the color of their German-deck equivalent.

The following gallery shows the spades in a standard 52-card deck of French-suited playing cards. Not shown is the Knight of Spades used in Tarot card games:

Ace

2

3

4

5

6

7

8

9

10

Jack

Queen

King

== Four-colour packs ==
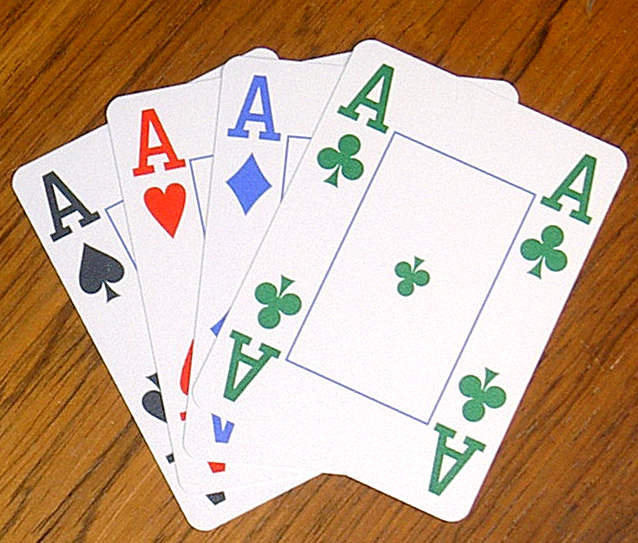
The four aces of a Four-color deck; here, Spades are black

Four-color decks are sometimes used in tournaments or online. In four-colour packs Spades may be:

- black in English bridge and poker packs and French and Swiss four-colour packs,
- green in German skat tournament packs or
- blue in some American poker decks

== Coding ==
The symbol ♠ is already in the computer code set CP437 and therefore also part of Windows WGL4. In Unicode a black ♠ and a white ♤ spade are defined:

Character information
Preview	♠		♤	
Unicode name	BLACK SPADE SUIT		WHITE SPADE SUIT	
Encodings	decimal	hex	dec	hex
Unicode	9824	U+2660	9828	U+2664
UTF-8	226 153 160	E2 99 A0	226 153 164	E2 99 A4
Numeric character reference	&#9824;	&#x2660;	&#9828;	&#x2664;
Named character reference	&spades;, &spadesuit;			
CP437	6	06		

== See also ==
- Spades (card game)

== Literature ==
- Allan, Elkan and Hannah Mackay (2007). The Poker Encyclopedia. London: Portico. ISBN 978-1906-03209-8
- Dummett, Sir Michael (1980). The Game of Tarot. Duckworth, London. ISBN 0 7156 1014 7
- Parlett, David (2008). The Penguin Book of Card Games. London, New York, Toronto: Penguin. ISBN 978-0-141-03787-5
