= Clubs (suit) =

Suit in French playing cards

- Native name: French: Trèfle
- Deck: French-suited playing cards
- Invented: 15th century

Clubs (♣) (French: Trèfle) is one of the four playing card suits in the standard French-suited playing cards. The symbol was derived from that of the suit of Acorns in a German deck when French suits were invented, around 1480.

In Skat and Doppelkopf, Clubs are the highest-ranked suit (whereas Diamonds and Bells are the trump suit in Doppelkopf). In Bridge, Clubs are the lowest suit.

== Name ==
Its original French name is Trèfle which means "clover" and the card symbol depicts a three-leafed clover leaf. The Italian name is Fiori ("flowers"). However, the English name "Clubs" is a translation of basto, the Spanish name for the suit of batons, suggesting that Spanish-suited cards were used in England before French suits were invented.

In Germany, this suit is known as Kreuz ("cross"), especially in the International Skat Regulations. In Austria, by contrast, it is also called Treff in reference to the French name, especially in the game of Bridge, where French names generally predominate. For example, Cœur is used instead of Herz.

== Characteristics ==
The symbol for the suit of Clubs depicts a very stylised three-leaf clover with its stalk oriented downwards.

Generally, the suit of Clubs is black in colour so they can be used in some games as a pair with Spades (suit), like Klondike (solitaire). However, the suit may also be green, for example as sometimes used in Bridge (where it is one of the two minor suits, along with Diamonds).

The gallery below shows a suit of Clubs from a French-suited playing cards of 52 cards. Not shown is the Knight of Clubs used in tarot card games:

Ace

2

3

4

5

6

7

8

9

10

Jack

Queen

King

== Four-colour packs ==
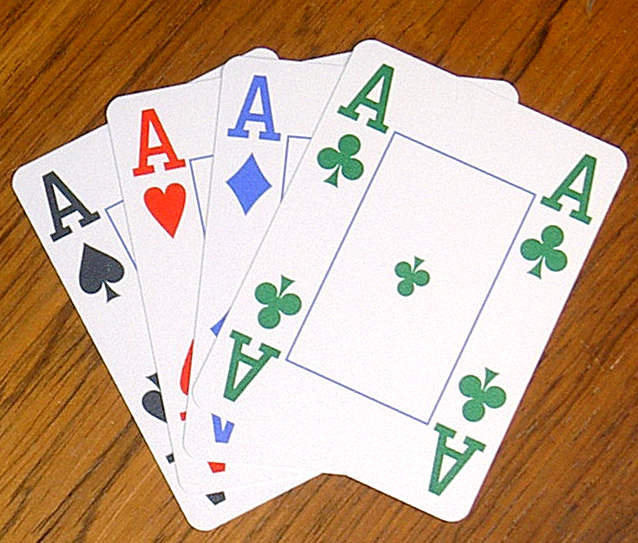
The four aces of a four-colour deck; here, Clubs are green.

Four-colour packs are sometimes used in tournaments or online. In four-colour packs, clubs may be:

- green in American Bridge and Poker, English Poker, French and Swiss four-colour decks,
- black in German Skat packs,
- blue in English Bridge and some American packs or
- pink in some other four-colour packs.

== Coding ==
The symbol ♣ is already in the CP437 and thus also part of Windows WGL4. In Unicode a black ♣ and a white ♧ Club symbol are defined:

Character information
Preview	♣		♧	
Unicode name	BLACK CLUB SUIT		WHITE CLUB SUIT	
Encodings	decimal	hex	dec	hex
Unicode	9827	U+2663	9831	U+2667
UTF-8	226 153 163	E2 99 A3	226 153 167	E2 99 A7
Numeric character reference	&#9827;	&#x2663;	&#9831;	&#x2667;
Named character reference	&clubs;, &clubsuit;			
CP437	5	05		

== Literature ==
- Allan, Elkan and Hannah Mackay. The Poker Encyclopedia. London: Portico ISBN 978-1906-03209-8
- Dummett, Michael (1980). The Game of Tarot. Duckworth, London. ISBN 0 7156 1014 7
- Parlett, David (2008). The Penguin Book of Card Games London: Penguin ISBN 978-0-141-03787-5
