= Hearts (suit) =

Suit in playing cards

- Native names: French: Cœur; German: Herz, Rot, Roth (arch.)
- Decks: French-suited playing cards; German-suited playing cards
- Invented: 15th century

Hearts (♥,) (French: Cœur, German: Herz) is one of the four playing card suits in a deck of French-suited and German-suited playing cards. However, the symbol is slightly different: is used in a French deck while is used in a German deck.

This suit was invented in 15th century Germany and is a survivor from a large pool of experimental suit signs created to replace the Latin suits. The standard German-suited system of leaves, acorns, hearts, and bells appears in the majority of cards from 1460 onwards. There is no evidence for this system prior to this point. The French design was created around 1480 when French suits were invented and was a simplified version of the existing German suit symbol for hearts in a German-suited pack.

In Swiss-suited playing cards, the equivalent suit is Roses, typically with the following suit symbol:.

== Name ==
In Bridge, for which in Germany the French deck is common, it is called by its French name, Cœur. In games using German-suited cards the suit of Hearts is often called "Red" (Rot), e.g. the Unter of Hearts would be the "Red Unter" (Rotunter or Rot-Unter) and the Nine of Hearts the "Red Nine" (Rotneun or Rot-Neun). In the game of Watten, the King of Hearts is the highest Trump. In Tiến Lên, Hearts are the highest-ranked suit.

The origin of the term "heart" to describe the symbol, which only very marginally resembles a true heart, is not known. In general, equivalents in other languages also mean "heart".

The heart in German suited cards

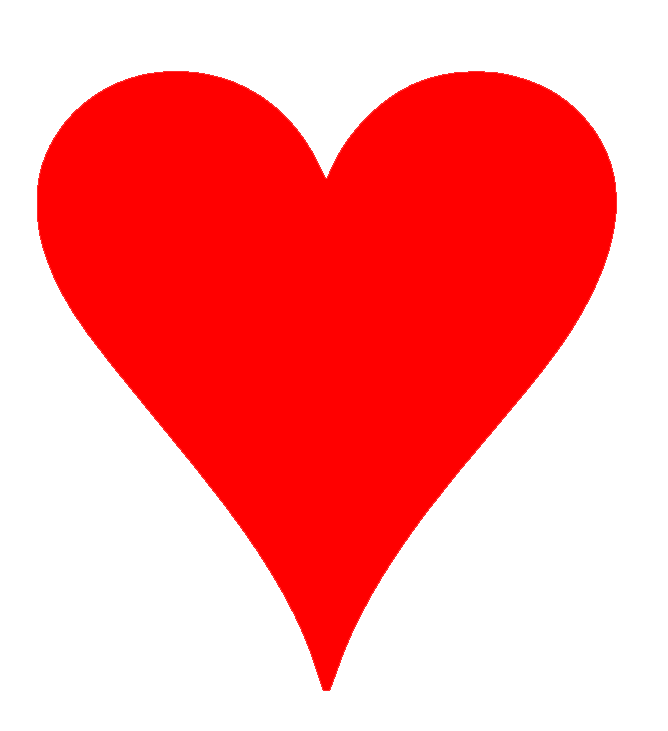
The heart in French suited cards

== Characteristics ==
The heart typically has a form of cardioid, the lower part of which ends in a point. The symbol is drawn with its tip down, the two lobes of the cardioid pointing upwards. Generally, the hearts are coloured red so they can be used in some games as a pair with Diamonds (suit), like Klondike (solitaire). They form one of the two major suits in bridge (with spades).

=== French pattern ===
The following gallery shows the hearts of a standard 52-card deck of French-suited playing cards. Not shown is the Knight of Hearts, used in tarot card games:

Ace

2

3

4

5

6

7

8

9

10

Jack

Queen

King

=== German pattern ===
The gallery below shows a suit of Hearts from a German-suited playing cards of 32 cards. The pack is of the Saxonian pattern:

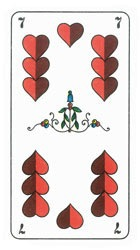
7

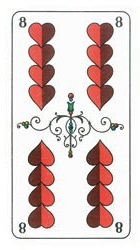
8

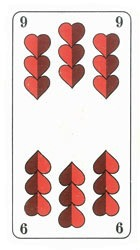
9

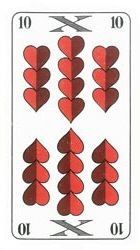
10

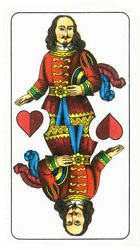
Unter

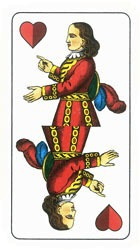
Ober

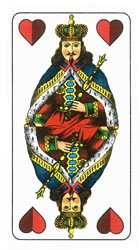
King

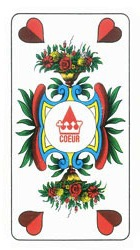
Deuce or Ace

== Four-colour packs ==
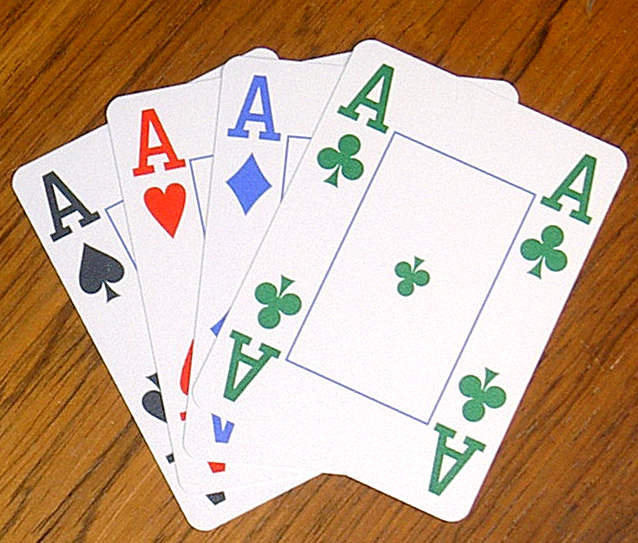
The four aces of a four-color deck; here, Hearts are red.

Four-color decks are sometimes used in tournaments or online. In such packs Hearts may be:

- red in almost all poker packs
- yellow in some other four-colour packs.

== Coding ==
The symbol ♥ is already in the CP437 and therefore also in the WGL4. In Unicode, a black heart ♥ and a white ♡ heart are defined:

Character information
Preview	♥		♡	
Unicode name	BLACK HEART SUIT		WHITE HEART SUIT	
Encodings	decimal	hex	dec	hex
Unicode	9829	U+2665	9825	U+2661
UTF-8	226 153 165	E2 99 A5	226 153 161	E2 99 A1
Numeric character reference	&#9829;	&#x2665;	&#9825;	&#x2661;
Named character reference	&hearts;, &heartsuit;			
CP437	3	03		

== See also ==
- Hearts (card game)
