= Diamonds (suit) =

Suit in French playing cards

- Native name: French: Carreau
- Deck: French-suited playing cards
- Invented: 15th century

Diamonds (♦) (French: Carreau) is one of the four playing card suits in the standard French-suited playing cards. Diamonds along with the other French suits were invented in around 1480. It is the only French suit to not have been adapted from the German deck, taking the place of the suit of Bells. There was one early French pack that used crescents instead of diamonds, which may explain this anomaly. Rough coloring techniques on the red stripe on the German bells may have caused the circles to appear as irregularly shaped dots, and French cardmakers may have decided to drop the details and straighten out the sides.

== Name ==
The original French name of the suit is Carreau; in German and Polish it is known as Karo.

In older German-language accounts of card games, Diamonds are frequently referred to as Eckstein ("cornerstone"). In Switzerland, the suit is still called Egge (Ecke i.e. "corner") today. The term "Karo" went into the German language in the 18th century from the French carreau, which goes back to the Latin word, quadrum, meaning "square" or "rectangle".

== Characteristics ==
The diamond typically has a lozenge shape, a parallelogram with four equal sides, placed on one of its points. The sides are sometimes slightly rounded and the four vertices placed in a square, making the sign look like an astroid.

Normally, diamonds are red in colour so they can be used in some games as a pair with Hearts, like Klondike. They can however be depicted in blue, which is the case for example in bridge (where it is one of the two minor suits along with Clubs). In the official Skat tournament deck, diamonds are yellow or orange, assuming the color of their German-deck equivalent, which are usually golden.

The following gallery shows the diamonds from a standard 52-card deck of French-suited playing cards. Not shown is the Knight of Diamonds used in the tarot card games:

Ace

2

3

4

5

6

7

8

9

10

Jack

Queen

King

== Four-colour packs ==
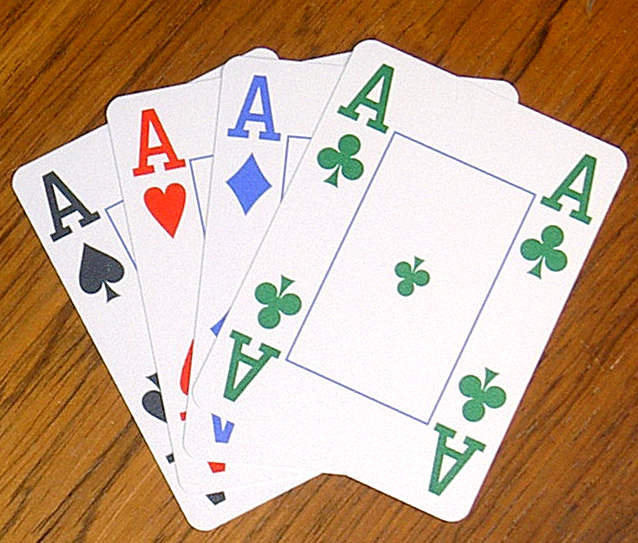
The four aces of a four-color deck; here, Diamonds are blue.

Four-color decks are sometimes used in tournaments or online. In such packs Diamonds may be:

- orange in English and German packs
- yellow in American decks and German Skat tournament packs or
- blue in English and American Poker decks, French and Swiss four-colour packs.

== Coding ==
The symbol ♦ is already in the CP437 and therefore also part of Windows WGL4. In Unicode a black ♦ and a white ♢ diamond have been defined:

Character information
Preview	♦		♢	
Unicode name	BLACK DIAMOND SUIT		WHITE DIAMOND SUIT	
Encodings	decimal	hex	dec	hex
Unicode	9830	U+2666	9826	U+2662
UTF-8	226 153 166	E2 99 A6	226 153 162	E2 99 A2
Numeric character reference	&#9830;	&#x2666;	&#9826;	&#x2662;
Named character reference	&diamondsuit;, &diams;			
CP437	4	04		

== Literature ==
- Allan, Elkan; Mackay, Hannah (2007). The poker encyclopedia : the definitive poker book. London: Portico. ISBN 978-1-906032-09-8. OCLC 156891597.
