= Five-suit bridge =

Late 1930s variation of contract bridge

- Type: Trick-taking game
- Players: 4
- Skills: Memory, tactics, probability, communication
- Cards: 65
- Deck: French deck (expanded)
- Rank (high→low): A K Q J 10 9 8 7 6 5 4 3 2
- Play: Clockwise
- Chance: Very Low

Related games
- Contract bridge, auction bridge, whist

Five-suit bridge is a late 1930s variation of contract bridge played with a deck of 65 playing cards divided into five suits.

== History ==
In the summer of 1937 in Vienna, Walter W. Marseille, with the help of Paul Stern, published rules for five-suit bridge which included a fifth suit of green Leaves, taken from German-suited William Tell cards. Printed by the local firm Piatnik, the court cards were adapted from the diamond suit of the Vienna pattern. This set off a fad for five-suited decks which would last until the middle of 1938.

De La Rue of London published packs called Five-Suit Bridge Playing Cards. This deck contained cards using blue crowns called Royals as a fifth suit. In the new suit, the court cards used the Paris pattern's heart suit designs. Waddingtons' print was like De La Rue's with the exception of more detailed Royal crown pips. They also published several decks that used green crowns but the face cards for that suit were a duplicate of other English pattern suits. Due to unpopularity, they were withdrawn in 1939. The decks became available at Selfridges department stores on 21 February 1938. Three days later, the purchase of a pair of decks by King George VI and Queen Elizabeth at the British Industries Fair (ran from 21 February to 4 March) elevated the profile of this game. These packs arrived in the US on 7 March 1938.

American manufacturers responded with a green Eagle as the fifth suit to avoid paying royalties as the Royals were copyrighted. The deck published by United States Playing Card Company (USPCC) had a green Eagle and the pips in the corner index were inside green circles. A second deck was by Russell Playing Cards (owned by the USPCC) used the same Eagle but in a darker shade and the pips in the corner index were devoid of the circle. These two decks reused the club courts for the new suit. A third deck was made by Arrco which had a different Eagle and reused the spade courts. At least six bridge books were subsequently published to support playing bridge with rules for this fifth suit by authors such as Oswald Jacoby, P. Hal Sims and Howard Schenken. It is more than likely the book that Arrco published was for their own deck. The title of a 1952 science-fiction novel by James Blish, Jack of Eagles, refers to the psychic protagonist's uniqueness.

Also in 1938, Parker Brothers created a five-suit bridge deck called Castle Bridge, in which the fifth suit of Castles looked like a Rook chess piece and was colored green. This pack reused the diamond courts for the new suit. The manual that came with this deck did not use Marseille's rules but Ammiel F. Decker's 1933 rules.

Ultimately, the complexity of adding a new suit to the game led to it falling out of popularity by the summer of 1938.

== Rules ==
The rules are similar to regular contract bridge but the new fifth suit is ranked higher than spades but lower than no trump in bidding. Decks usually came with one joker but this is discarded before play as it is not used. The original Piatnik deck did not have a joker but a manufacturer's name card. Sixteen cards are dealt to each player with the remaining 65th card (the widow or kitty) being dealt face up on the middle of the table. This card would go to whoever made the highest bid, who would then discard a card that must be exposed.
