= Miscellaneous Symbols =

Unicode block

- Range: U+2600..U+26FF (256 code points)
- Plane: BMP
- Scripts: Common
- Symbol sets: Weather; Astrological; Chess; Recycling; Map symbols
- Assigned: 256 code points
- Unused: 0 reserved code points
- Source standards: ARIB STD-B24

Unicode Version History
- 1.0.0 (1991): 106 (+106)
- 3.0 (1999): 109 (+3)
- 3.2 (2002): 133 (+24)
- 4.0 (2003): 145 (+12)
- 4.1 (2005): 175 (+30)
- 5.0 (2006): 176 (+1)
- 5.1 (2008): 191 (+15)
- 5.2 (2009): 250 (+59)
- 6.0 (2010): 256 (+6)

Unicode documentation
- Code chart ∣ Web page

Miscellaneous Symbols is a Unicode block (U+2600–U+26FF) containing graphemes representing concepts from a variety of categories: astrological, astronomical, chess, dice, musical notation, political symbols, recycling, religious symbols, trigrams, warning signs, and weather, among others.

== Tables ==
=== Compact table ===
Miscellaneous Symbols^{[1]} Official Unicode Consortium code chart (PDF)
	0	1	2	3	4	5	6	7	8	9	A	B	C	D	E	F
U+260x	☀	☁	☂	☃	☄	★	☆	☇	☈	☉	☊	☋	☌	☍	☎	☏
U+261x	☐	☑	☒	☓	☔	☕	☖	☗	☘	☙	☚	☛	☜	☝	☞	☟
U+262x	☠	☡	☢	☣	☤	☥	☦	☧	☨	☩	☪	☫	☬	☭	☮	☯
U+263x	☰	☱	☲	☳	☴	☵	☶	☷	☸	☹	☺	☻	☼	☽	☾	☿
U+264x	♀	♁	♂	♃	♄	♅	♆	♇	♈	♉	♊	♋	♌	♍	♎	♏
U+265x	♐	♑	♒	♓	♔	♕	♖	♗	♘	♙	♚	♛	♜	♝	♞	♟
U+266x	♠	♡	♢	♣	♤	♥	♦	♧	♨	♩	♪	♫	♬	♭	♮	♯
U+267x	♰	♱	♲	♳	♴	♵	♶	♷	♸	♹	♺	♻	♼	♽	♾	♿
U+268x	⚀	⚁	⚂	⚃	⚄	⚅	⚆	⚇	⚈	⚉	⚊	⚋	⚌	⚍	⚎	⚏
U+269x	⚐	⚑	⚒	⚓	⚔	⚕	⚖	⚗	⚘	⚙	⚚	⚛	⚜	⚝	⚞	⚟
U+26Ax	⚠	⚡	⚢	⚣	⚤	⚥	⚦	⚧	⚨	⚩	⚪	⚫	⚬	⚭	⚮	⚯
U+26Bx	⚰	⚱	⚲	⚳	⚴	⚵	⚶	⚷	⚸	⚹	⚺	⚻	⚼	⚽	⚾	⚿
U+26Cx	⛀	⛁	⛂	⛃	⛄	⛅	⛆	⛇	⛈	⛉	⛊	⛋	⛌	⛍	⛎	⛏
U+26Dx	⛐	⛑	⛒	⛓	⛔	⛕	⛖	⛗	⛘	⛙	⛚	⛛	⛜	⛝	⛞	⛟
U+26Ex	⛠	⛡	⛢	⛣	⛤	⛥	⛦	⛧	⛨	⛩	⛪	⛫	⛬	⛭	⛮	⛯
U+26Fx	⛰	⛱	⛲	⛳	⛴	⛵	⛶	⛷	⛸	⛹	⛺	⛻	⛼	⛽	⛾	⛿
Notes 1.As of Unicode version 17.0

=== Definitions ===
Miscellaneous Symbols Unicode block
Official name	Grapheme	Codepoint	HTML	Official description
Black sun with rays	☀	U+2600	&#9728;	Clear weather
Cloud	☁	U+2601	&#9729;	Cloud, cloudy weather
Umbrella	☂	U+2602	&#9730;	Umbrella, rainy weather
Snowman	☃	U+2603	&#9731;	Snowman, snowy weather
Comet	☄	U+2604	&#9732;	
Black star	★	U+2605	&#9733;	
White star	☆	U+2606	&#9734;	
Lightning	☇	U+2607	&#9735;	Lightning
Thunderstorm	☈	U+2608	&#9736;	Thunderstorm
Sun	☉	U+2609	&#9737;	Sun, gold
Ascending node	☊	U+260A	&#9738;	
Descending node	☋	U+260B	&#9739;	
Conjunction	☌	U+260C	&#9740;	Open circuit
Opposition	☍	U+260D	&#9741;	Closed circuit
Black telephone	☎	U+260E	&#9742;	
White telephone	☏	U+260F	&#9743;	
Ballot box	☐	U+2610	&#9744;	Check box, optional information
Ballot box with check	☑	U+2611	&#9745;	
Ballot box with X	☒	U+2612	&#9746;	
Saltire	☓	U+2613	&#9747;	
Umbrella with raindrops	☔︎	U+2614	&#9748;	Showery weather
Hot beverage	☕︎	U+2615	&#9749;	Tea, coffee, hot chocolate
White shogi piece	☖	U+2616	&#9750;	
Black shogi piece	☗	U+2617	&#9751;	
Shamrock	☘	U+2618	&#9752;	Good luck
Reversed rotated floral heart bullet	☙	U+2619	&#9753;	Binding signature mark
Black left pointing index	☚	U+261A	&#9754;	Directing left
Black right pointing index	☛	U+261B	&#9755;	Directing right
White left pointing index	☜	U+261C	&#9756;	
White up pointing index	☝	U+261D	&#9757;	
White right pointing index	☞	U+261E	&#9758;	
White down pointing index	☟	U+261F	&#9759;	
Skull and crossbones	☠	U+2620	&#9760;	Poison, death
Caution sign	☡	U+2621	&#9761;	
Radioactive sign	☢	U+2622	&#9762;	Toxic hazard, nuclear fallout
Biohazard sign	☣	U+2623	&#9763;	Disease, epidemic, pandemic
Caduceus	☤	U+2624	&#9764;	Trade
Ankh	☥	U+2625	&#9765;	Religious symbol
Orthodox cross	☦	U+2626	&#9766;	Patriarchal cross
Chi Rho	☧	U+2627	&#9767;	Labarum
Cross of Lorraine	☨	U+2628	&#9768;	Patriarchal cross
Cross of Jerusalem	☩	U+2629	&#9769;	Cross potent
Star and crescent	☪	U+262A	&#9770;	Emblem of Turkey; Islam
Farsi symbol	☫	U+262B	&#9771;	Emblem of Iran
Adi shakti	☬	U+262C	&#9772;	Khanda
Hammer and sickle	☭	U+262D	&#9773;	Communism
Peace symbol	☮	U+262E	&#9774;	Peace
Yin yang	☯	U+262F	&#9775;	Taoism, balance
Trigram for Heaven	☰	U+2630	&#9776;	
Trigram for Lake	☱	U+2631	&#9777;	
Trigram for Fire	☲	U+2632	&#9778;	
Trigram for Thunder	☳	U+2633	&#9779;	
Trigram for Wind	☴	U+2634	&#9780;	
Trigram for Water	☵	U+2635	&#9781;	
Trigram for Mountain	☶	U+2636	&#9782;	
Trigram for Earth	☷	U+2637	&#9783;	
Wheel of Dharma	☸	U+2638	&#9784;	
White frowning face	☹	U+2639	&#9785;	
White smiling face	☺	U+263A	&#9786;	
Black smiling face	☻	U+263B	&#9787;	
White sun with rays	☼	U+263C	&#9788;	Compass
First quarter moon	☽	U+263D	&#9789;	Silver, waxing crescent as seen north of tropics
Last quarter moon	☾	U+263E	&#9790;	Waning crescent as seen north of tropics
Mercury	☿	U+263F	&#9791;	Mercury (planet), mercury (element), Hermaphrodite
Venus	♀	U+2640	&#9792;	Venus (planet), copper, femininity, Woman
Earth	♁	U+2641	&#9793;	Antimony
Mars	♂	U+2642	&#9794;	Mars (planet), iron, masculinity, Man
Jupiter	♃	U+2643	&#9795;	Jupiter (planet), tin
Saturn	♄	U+2644	&#9796;	Saturn (planet), lead
Uranus	♅	U+2645	&#9797;	For the astronomical symbol see U+26E2
Neptune	♆	U+2646	&#9798;	Neptune (planet)
Pluto	♇	U+2647	&#9799;	Pluto
Aries	♈︎	U+2648	&#9800;	Aries (constellation)
Taurus	♉︎	U+2649	&#9801;	Taurus (constellation)
Gemini	♊︎	U+264A	&#9802;	Gemini (constellation)
Cancer	♋︎	U+264B	&#9803;	Cancer (constellation)
Leo	♌︎	U+264C	&#9804;	Leo (constellation)
Virgo	♍︎	U+264D	&#9805;	Virgo (constellation)
Libra	♎︎	U+264E	&#9806;	Libra (constellation)
Scorpius	♏︎	U+264F	&#9807;	Scorpius (constellation), minim
Sagittarius	♐︎	U+2650	&#9808;	Sagittarius (constellation)
Capricorn	♑︎	U+2651	&#9809;	Capricornus (constellation)
Aquarius	♒︎	U+2652	&#9810;	Aquarius (constellation)
Pisces	♓︎	U+2653	&#9811;	Pisces (constellation)
White chess king	♔	U+2654	&#9812;	
White chess queen	♕	U+2655	&#9813;	
White chess rook	♖	U+2656	&#9814;	
White chess bishop	♗	U+2657	&#9815;	
White chess knight	♘	U+2658	&#9816;	
White chess pawn	♙	U+2659	&#9817;	
Black chess king	♚	U+265A	&#9818;	
Black chess queen	♛	U+265B	&#9819;	
Black chess rook	♜	U+265C	&#9820;	
Black chess bishop	♝	U+265D	&#9821;	
Black chess knight	♞	U+265E	&#9822;	
Black chess pawn	♟	U+265F	&#9823;	
Black spade suit	♠	U+2660	&spades;	
White heart suit	♡	U+2661	&#9825;	
White diamond suit	♢	U+2662	&#9826;	
Black club suit	♣	U+2663	&clubs;	
White spade suit	♤	U+2664	&#9828;	
Black heart suit	♥	U+2665	&hearts;	
Black diamond suit	♦	U+2666	&diams;	
White club suit	♧	U+2667	&#9831;	
Hot springs	♨	U+2668	&#9832;	Onsen
Quarter note	♩	U+2669	&#9833;	Crotchet
Eighth note	♪	U+266A	&#9834;	Quaver
Beamed eighth notes	♫	U+266B	&#9835;	Linked quavers
Beamed sixteenth notes	♬	U+266C	&#9836;	Linked semi-quavers
Music flat sign	♭	U+266D	&#9837;	
Music natural sign	♮	U+266E	&#9838;	
Music sharp sign	♯	U+266F	&#9839;	
West Syriac cross	♰	U+2670	&#9840;	
East Syriac cross	♱	U+2671	&#9841;	
Universal recycling symbol	♲	U+2672	&#9842;	
Recycling symbol for type-1 plastics	♳	U+2673	&#9843;	
Recycling symbol for type-2 plastics	♴	U+2674	&#9844;	
Recycling symbol for type-3 plastics	♵	U+2675	&#9845;	
Recycling symbol for type-4 plastics	♶	U+2676	&#9846;	
Recycling symbol for type-5 plastics	♷	U+2677	&#9847;	
Recycling symbol for type-6 plastics	♸	U+2678	&#9848;	
Recycling symbol for type-7 plastics	♹	U+2679	&#9849;	
Recycling symbol for generic materials	♺	U+267A	&#9850;	
Black universal recycling symbol	♻	U+267B	&#9851;	
Recycled paper symbol	♼	U+267C	&#9852;	
Partially-recycled paper symbol	♽	U+267D	&#9853;	
Permanent paper sign	♾	U+267E	&#9854;	
Wheelchair symbol	♿︎	U+267F	&#9855;	
Die face-1	⚀	U+2680	&#9856;	
Die face-2	⚁	U+2681	&#9857;	
Die face-3	⚂	U+2682	&#9858;	
Die face-4	⚃	U+2683	&#9859;	
Die face-5	⚄	U+2684	&#9860;	
Die face-6	⚅	U+2685	&#9861;	
White circle with dot right	⚆	U+2686	&#9862;	
White circle with two dots	⚇	U+2687	&#9863;	
Black circle with white dot right	⚈	U+2688	&#9864;	
Black circle with two white dots	⚉	U+2689	&#9865;	
Monogram for yang	⚊	U+268A	&#9866;	
Monogram for yin	⚋	U+268B	&#9867;	
Digram for greater yang	⚌	U+268C	&#9868;	
Digram for lesser yin	⚍	U+268D	&#9869;	
Digram for lesser yang	⚎	U+268E	&#9870;	
Digram for greater yin	⚏	U+268F	&#9871;	
White flag	⚐	U+2690	&#9872;	From KPS 9566. Map symbol for a battle site.
Black flag	⚑	U+2691	&#9873;	From KPS 9566. Map symbol for a battle site.
Hammer and pick	⚒	U+2692	&#9874;	Mining, working day
Anchor	⚓︎	U+2693	&#9875;	Nautical term, harbor
Crossed swords	⚔	U+2694	&#9876;	Military term, battleground, killed in action
Rod of Asclepius	⚕	U+2695	&#9877;	Medical term
Scales	⚖	U+2696	&#9878;	Legal term, jurisprudence
Alembic	⚗	U+2697	&#9879;	Chemical term, chemistry
Flower	⚘	U+2698	&#9880;	Botanical term
Gear	⚙	U+2699	&#9881;	Technology, tools
Staff of Hermes	⚚	U+269A	&#9882;	Caduceus, commercial term, commerce
Atom symbol	⚛	U+269B	&#9883;	Nuclear installation
Fleur-de-lis	⚜	U+269C	&#9884;	France, Quebec, Trinity, Scouting
Outlined white star	⚝	U+269D	&#9885;	Coat of arms of Morocco
Three lines converging right	⚞	U+269E	&#9886;	Someone speaking closed captioning symbol (from ARIB STD B24)
Three lines converging left	⚟	U+269F	&#9887;	Background speaking closed captioning symbol (from ARIB STD B24)
Warning sign	⚠	U+26A0	&#9888;	
High voltage sign	⚡︎	U+26A1	&#9889;	
Doubled female sign	⚢	U+26A2	&#9890;	Female homosexuality
Doubled male sign	⚣	U+26A3	&#9891;	Male homosexuality
Interlocked female and male sign	⚤	U+26A4	&#9892;	Male or Female bisexuality
Male and female sign	⚥	U+26A5	&#9893;	Male or Female heterosexuality, Hermaphrodite (in entomology)
Male with stroke sign	⚦	U+26A6	&#9894;	Transgender
Male with stroke and male and female sign Transgender symbol (Emoji 13.0)	⚧	U+26A7	&#9895;	Transgender
Vertical male with stroke sign	⚨	U+26A8	&#9896;	Iron(II) sulfate
Horizontal male with stroke sign	⚩	U+26A9	&#9897;	Magnesium
Medium white circle	⚪︎	U+26AA	&#9898;	Asexuality, sexless, genderless, engaged, betrothed
Medium black circle	⚫︎	U+26AB	&#9899;	Symbol for record function
Medium small white circle	⚬	U+26AC	&#9900;	Engaged, betrothed
Marriage symbol	⚭	U+26AD	&#9901;	
Divorce symbol	⚮	U+26AE	&#9902;	
Unmarried partnership symbol	⚯	U+26AF	&#9903;	
Coffin	⚰	U+26B0	&#9904;	Buried (genealogy)
Funeral urn	⚱	U+26B1	&#9905;	Cremated (genealogy)
Neuter	⚲	U+26B2	&#9906;	
Ceres	⚳	U+26B3	&#9907;	1 Ceres (dwarf planet)
Pallas	⚴	U+26B4	&#9908;	2 Pallas
Juno	⚵	U+26B5	&#9909;	3 Juno
Vesta	⚶	U+26B6	&#9910;	4 Vesta
Chiron	⚷	U+26B7	&#9911;	2060 Chiron
Black moon Lilith	⚸	U+26B8	&#9912;	
Sextile	⚹	U+26B9	&#9913;	Sal ammoniac
Semisextile	⚺	U+26BA	&#9914;	
Quincunx	⚻	U+26BB	&#9915;	
Sesquiquadrate	⚼	U+26BC	&#9916;	
Soccer ball	⚽︎	U+26BD	&#9917;	
Baseball	⚾︎	U+26BE	&#9918;	
Squared key	⚿	U+26BF	&#9919;	Parental lock (from ARIB STD B24)
White draughts man	⛀	U+26C0	&#9920;	
White draughts king	⛁	U+26C1	&#9921;	
Black draughts man	⛂	U+26C2	&#9922;	
Black draughts king	⛃	U+26C3	&#9923;	
Snowman without snow	⛄︎	U+26C4	&#9924;	Light snow (from ARIB STD B24)
Sun behind cloud	⛅︎	U+26C5	&#9925;	Partly cloudy (from ARIB STD B24)
Rain	⛆	U+26C6	&#9926;	Rainy weather (from ARIB STD B24)
Black snowman	⛇	U+26C7	&#9927;	Heavy snow (from ARIB STD B24)
Thunder cloud and rain	⛈	U+26C8	&#9928;	Thunderstorm (from ARIB STD B24)
Turned white shogi piece	⛉	U+26C9	&#9929;	From ARIB STD B24
Turned black shogi piece	⛊	U+26CA	&#9930;	From ARIB STD B24
White diamond in square	⛋	U+26CB	&#9931;	From ARIB STD B24
Crossing lanes	⛌	U+26CC	&#9932;	Accident (from ARIB STD B24)
Disabled car	⛍	U+26CD	&#9933;	From ARIB STD B24
Ophiuchus	⛎︎	U+26CE	&#9934;	Ophiuchus (astrology), new in Unicode 6
Pick	⛏	U+26CF	&#9935;	Under construction (from ARIB STD B24)
Car sliding	⛐	U+26D0	&#9936;	Icy road (from ARIB STD B24)
Helmet with white cross	⛑	U+26D1	&#9937;	Maintenance (from ARIB STD B24)
Circled crossing lanes	⛒	U+26D2	&#9938;	Road closed (from ARIB STD B24)
Chains	⛓	U+26D3	&#9939;	Tyre chains required (from ARIB STD B24)
No entry	⛔︎	U+26D4	&#9940;	From ARIB STD B24
Alternate one-way left way traffic	⛕	U+26D5	&#9941;	From ARIB STD B24
Black two-way left way traffic	⛖	U+26D6	&#9942;	From ARIB STD B24
White two-way left way traffic	⛗	U+26D7	&#9943;	From ARIB STD B24
Black left lane merge	⛘	U+26D8	&#9944;	From ARIB STD B24
White left lane merge	⛙	U+26D9	&#9945;	From ARIB STD B24
Drive slow sign	⛚	U+26DA	&#9946;	From ARIB STD B24
Heavy white down-pointing triangle	⛛	U+26DB	&#9947;	Drive slow (from ARIB STD B24)
Left closed entry	⛜	U+26DC	&#9948;	From ARIB STD B24
Squared saltire	⛝	U+26DD	&#9949;	Closed entry (from ARIB STD B24)
Falling diagonal in white circle in black square	⛞	U+26DE	&#9950;	Closed to large vehicles (from ARIB STD B24)
Black truck	⛟	U+26DF	&#9951;	Closed to large vehicles, alternate (from ARIB STD B24)
Restricted left entry-1	⛠	U+26E0	&#9952;	From ARIB STD B24
Restricted left entry-2	⛡	U+26E1	&#9953;	From ARIB STD B24
Astronomical symbol for Uranus	⛢	U+26E2	&#9954;	New in Unicode 6
Heavy circle with stroke and two dots above	⛣	U+26E3	&#9955;	Public office (from ARIB STD B24)
Pentagram	⛤	U+26E4	&#9956;	New in Unicode 6
Right-handed interlaced pentagram	⛥	U+26E5	&#9957;	New in Unicode 6
Left-handed interlaced pentagram	⛦	U+26E6	&#9958;	New in Unicode 6
Inverted pentagram	⛧	U+26E7	&#9959;	New in Unicode 6
Black cross on shield	⛨	U+26E8	&#9960;	Hospital (from ARIB STD B24)
Shinto shrine	⛩	U+26E9	&#9961;	Torii (from ARIB STD B24)
Church	⛪︎	U+26EA	&#9962;	From ARIB STD B24
Castle	⛫	U+26EB	&#9963;	From ARIB STD B24
Historic site	⛬	U+26EC	&#9964;	From ARIB STD B24
Gear without hub	⛭	U+26ED	&#9965;	Factory (from ARIB STD B24)
Gear with handles	⛮	U+26EE	&#9966;	Power plant, power substation (from ARIB STD B24)
Map symbol for lighthouse	⛯	U+26EF	&#9967;	From ARIB STD B24
Mountain	⛰	U+26F0	&#9968;	From ARIB STD B24
Umbrella on ground	⛱	U+26F1	&#9969;	Bathing beach (from ARIB STD B24)
Fountain	⛲︎	U+26F2	&#9970;	Park (from ARIB STD B24)
Flag in hole	⛳︎	U+26F3	&#9971;	Golf course (from ARIB STD B24)
Ferry	⛴	U+26F4	&#9972;	Ferry boat terminal (from ARIB STD B24)
Sailboat	⛵︎	U+26F5	&#9973;	Marina or yacht harbour (from ARIB STD B24)
Square four corners	⛶	U+26F6	&#9974;	Intersection (from ARIB STD B24)
Skier	⛷	U+26F7	&#9975;	Ski resort (from ARIB STD B24)
Ice skate	⛸	U+26F8	&#9976;	Ice skating rink (from ARIB STD B24)
Person with ball	⛹	U+26F9	&#9977;	Track and field, gymnasium (from ARIB STD B24)
Tent	⛺︎	U+26FA	&#9978;	Camping site (from ARIB STD B24)
Japanese bank symbol	⛻	U+26FB	&#9979;	From ARIB STD B24
Headstone graveyard symbol	⛼	U+26FC	&#9980;	Graveyard, memorial park, cemetery (from ARIB STD B24)
Fuel pump	⛽︎	U+26FD	&#9981;	Petrol station, gas station (from ARIB STD B24)
Cup on black square	⛾	U+26FE	&#9982;	Drive-in restaurant (from ARIB STD B24)
White flag with horizontal middle black stripe	⛿	U+26FF	&#9983;	Japanese self-defense force site (from ARIB STD B24)

== Emoji ==
The Miscellaneous Symbols block contains 83 emoji: U+2600–U+2604, U+260E, U+2611, U+2614–U+2615, U+2618, U+261D, U+2620, U+2622–U+2623, U+2626, U+262A, U+262E–U+262F, U+2638–U+263A, U+2640, U+2642, U+2648–U+2653, U+265F–U+2660, U+2663, U+2665–U+2666, U+2668, U+267B, U+267E–U+267F, U+2692–U+2697, U+2699, U+269B–U+269C, U+26A0–U+26A1, U+26A7, U+26AA–U+26AB, U+26B0–U+26B1, U+26BD–U+26BE, U+26C4–U+26C5, U+26C8, U+26CE–U+26CF, U+26D1, U+26D3–U+26D4, U+26E9–U+26EA, U+26F0–U+26F5, U+26F7–U+26FA and U+26FD.

The block has 166 standardized variants defined to specify emoji-style (U+FE0F VS16) or text presentation (U+FE0E VS15) for the following 83 base characters: U+2600–U+2604, U+260E, U+2611, U+2614–U+2615, U+2618, U+261D, U+2620, U+2622–U+2623, U+2626, U+262A, U+262E–U+262F, U+2638–U+263A, U+2640, U+2642, U+2648–U+2653, U+265F–U+2660, U+2663, U+2665–U+2666, U+2668, U+267B, U+267E–U+267F, U+2692–U+2697, U+2699, U+269B–U+269C, U+26A0–U+26A1, U+26A7, U+26AA–U+26AB, U+26B0–U+26B1, U+26BD–U+26BE, U+26C4–U+26C5, U+26C8, U+26CE–U+26CF, U+26D1, U+26D3–U+26D4, U+26E9–U+26EA, U+26F0–U+26F5, U+26F7–U+26FA and U+26FD.

Emoji variation sequences
U+	2600	2601	2602	2603	2604	260E	2611	2614	2615	2618	261D	2620
default presentation	text	text	text	text	text	text	text	emoji	emoji	text	text	text
base code point	☀	☁	☂	☃	☄	☎	☑	☔	☕	☘	☝	☠
base+VS15 (text)	☀︎	☁︎	☂︎	☃︎	☄︎	☎︎	☑︎	☔︎	☕︎	☘︎	☝︎	☠︎
base+VS16 (emoji)	☀️	☁️	☂️	☃️	☄️	☎️	☑️	☔️	☕️	☘️	☝️	☠️
U+	2622	2623	2626	262A	262E	262F	2638	2639	263A	2640	2642	2648
default presentation	text	text	text	text	text	text	text	text	text	text	text	emoji
base code point	☢	☣	☦	☪	☮	☯	☸	☹	☺	♀	♂	♈
base+VS15 (text)	☢︎	☣︎	☦︎	☪︎	☮︎	☯︎	☸︎	☹︎	☺︎	♀︎	♂︎	♈︎
base+VS16 (emoji)	☢️	☣️	☦️	☪️	☮️	☯️	☸️	☹️	☺️	♀️	♂️	♈️
U+	2649	264A	264B	264C	264D	264E	264F	2650	2651	2652	2653	265F
default presentation	emoji	emoji	emoji	emoji	emoji	emoji	emoji	emoji	emoji	emoji	emoji	text
base code point	♉	♊	♋	♌	♍	♎	♏	♐	♑	♒	♓	♟
base+VS15 (text)	♉︎	♊︎	♋︎	♌︎	♍︎	♎︎	♏︎	♐︎	♑︎	♒︎	♓︎	♟︎
base+VS16 (emoji)	♉️	♊️	♋️	♌️	♍️	♎️	♏️	♐️	♑️	♒️	♓️	♟️
U+	2660	2663	2665	2666	2668	267B	267E	267F	2692	2693	2694	2695
default presentation	text	text	text	text	text	text	text	emoji	text	emoji	text	text
base code point	♠	♣	♥	♦	♨	♻	♾	♿	⚒	⚓	⚔	⚕
base+VS15 (text)	♠︎	♣︎	♥︎	♦︎	♨︎	♻︎	♾︎	♿︎	⚒︎	⚓︎	⚔︎	⚕︎
base+VS16 (emoji)	♠️	♣️	♥️	♦️	♨️	♻️	♾️	♿️	⚒️	⚓️	⚔️	⚕️
U+	2696	2697	2699	269B	269C	26A0	26A1	26A7	26AA	26AB	26B0	26B1
default presentation	text	text	text	text	text	text	emoji	text	emoji	emoji	text	text
base code point	⚖	⚗	⚙	⚛	⚜	⚠	⚡	⚧	⚪	⚫	⚰	⚱
base+VS15 (text)	⚖︎	⚗︎	⚙︎	⚛︎	⚜︎	⚠︎	⚡︎	⚧︎	⚪︎	⚫︎	⚰︎	⚱︎
base+VS16 (emoji)	⚖️	⚗️	⚙️	⚛️	⚜️	⚠️	⚡️	⚧️	⚪️	⚫️	⚰️	⚱️
U+	26BD	26BE	26C4	26C5	26C8	26CE	26CF	26D1	26D3	26D4	26E9	26EA
default presentation	emoji	emoji	emoji	emoji	text	emoji	text	text	text	emoji	text	emoji
base code point	⚽	⚾	⛄	⛅	⛈	⛎	⛏	⛑	⛓	⛔	⛩	⛪
base+VS15 (text)	⚽︎	⚾︎	⛄︎	⛅︎	⛈︎	⛎︎	⛏︎	⛑︎	⛓︎	⛔︎	⛩︎	⛪︎
base+VS16 (emoji)	⚽️	⚾️	⛄️	⛅️	⛈️	⛎️	⛏️	⛑️	⛓️	⛔️	⛩️	⛪️
U+	26F0	26F1	26F2	26F3	26F4	26F5	26F7	26F8	26F9	26FA	26FD	
default presentation	text	text	emoji	emoji	text	emoji	text	text	text	emoji	emoji	
base code point	⛰	⛱	⛲	⛳	⛴	⛵	⛷	⛸	⛹	⛺	⛽	
base+VS15 (text)	⛰︎	⛱︎	⛲︎	⛳︎	⛴︎	⛵︎	⛷︎	⛸︎	⛹︎	⛺︎	⛽︎	
base+VS16 (emoji)	⛰️	⛱️	⛲️	⛳️	⛴️	⛵️	⛷️	⛸️	⛹️	⛺️	⛽️	

=== Emoji modifiers ===
The Miscellaneous Symbols block has two emoji that represent people or body parts. They can be modified using U+1F3FB–U+1F3FF to provide for a range of human skin color using the Fitzpatrick scale:

Human emoji
U+	261D	26F9
emoji	☝️	⛹️
FITZ-1-2	☝️🏻	⛹🏻
FITZ-3	☝️🏼	⛹🏼
FITZ-4	☝️🏽	⛹🏽
FITZ-5	☝️🏾	⛹🏾
FITZ-6	☝️🏿	⛹🏿

Additional human emoji can be found in other Unicode blocks: Dingbats, Emoticons, Miscellaneous Symbols and Pictographs, Supplemental Symbols and Pictographs, Symbols and Pictographs Extended-A and Transport and Map Symbols.

== History ==
In Unicode 1.0 (1991) the same block was named Miscellaneous Dingbats (not to be confused with current "Dingbats" block, which was then named "Zapf Dingbats").

The following Unicode-related documents record the purpose and process of defining specific characters in the Miscellaneous Symbols block:

Version	Final code points (Note: Proposed code points and characters names may differ from final code points and names)	Count	L2 ID	WG2 ID	Document
1.0.0	U+2600..2613, 261A..266F	106			(to be determined)
1.0.0	U+2600..2613, 261A..266F	106	L2/11-438 (Note: See also L2/10-458, L2/11-414, L2/11-415, and L2/11-429) (Note: Refer to the history section of the Miscellaneous Symbols and Pictographs block for additional emoji-related documents)	N4182	Edberg, Peter (2011-12-22), Emoji Variation Sequences (Revision of L2/11-429)
1.0.0	U+2600..2613, 261A..266F	106	L2/15-050R (Note: See also L2/13-207, L2/14-054, L2/14-063, L2/15-051A, L2/15-051B)		Davis, Mark; et al. (2015-01-29), Additional variation selectors for emoji
1.0.0	U+2600..2613, 261A..266F	106	L2/15-301 (Note: See also L2/15-198 and L2/15-275)		Pournader, Roozbeh (2015-11-01), A proposal for 278 standardized variation sequences for emoji
1.0.0	U+2600..2613, 261A..266F	106	L2/16-036		Davis, Mark (2016-01-24), Nameslist.txt suggestions
1.0.0	U+2600..2613, 261A..266F	106	L2/16-281		Burge, Jeremy; Hunt, Paul (2016-10-17), Emoji Glyph Updates
1.0.0	U+2600..2613, 261A..266F	106	L2/16-361		Pournader, Roozbeh; Felt, Doug (2016-11-07), Add text and emoji standardized variation sequences for 96 symbols
1.0.0	U+2600..2613, 261A..266F	106	L2/17-232		Buff, Charlotte (2017-06-28), Proposal for Fully Gender-Inclusive Emoji
1.0.0	U+2600..2613, 261A..266F	106	L2/17-287		Davis, Mark; Edberg, Peter (2017-08-08), "Gender Sign Sequences", Recommendations from ESC for 2018, part 2
1.0.0	U+2600..2613, 261A..266F	106	L2/18-018		Abdul, Juber Moulvi (2017-10-04), Chess Emoji Submission
1.0.0	U+2600..2613, 261A..266F	106	L2/17-401		Ad Hoc recommendations for Emoji 6, 2017-10-26
1.0.0	U+2600..2613, 261A..266F	106	L2/18-023		"2.2", ESC Recommendations for Emoji 11.0, 2018-01-18
1.0.0	U+2600..2613, 261A..266F	106	L2/18-007		Moore, Lisa (2018-03-19), "E.1.1", UTC #154 Minutes
1.0.0	U+2600..2613, 261A..266F	106	L2/17-362		Moore, Lisa (2018-02-02), "Consensus 153-C34", UTC #153 Minutes
1.0.0	U+2600..2613, 261A..266F	106	L2/18-059		Burge, Jeremy; Haggerty, Bryan (2018-02-02), Proposal for new RGI Emoji Sequence, Pirate Flag Emoji
1.0.0	U+2600..2613, 261A..266F	106	L2/18-313		Singh, Amandeep (2018-09-30), Correcting the name and position of U+262C currently labeled as ADI SHAKTI
1.0.0	U+2600..2613, 261A..266F	106	L2/19-047		Anderson, Deborah; et al. (2019-01-13), "21. Adi Shakti", Recommendations to UTC #158 January 2019 on Script Proposals
1.0.0	U+2600..2613, 261A..266F	106	L2/19-008		Moore, Lisa (2019-02-08), "D.5 Correcting the name and position of U+262C", UTC #158 Minutes
1.0.0	U+2600..2613, 261A..266F	106	L2/19-078		Daniel, Jennifer (2019-03-05), Using Gender Inclusive Designs
1.0.0	U+2600..2613, 261A..266F	106	L2/19-231R		Daniel, Jennifer (2019-07-23), Recommendations for Gendered Emoji ZWJ Sequences for Unicode 13.0, Phase 2
1.0.0	U+2600..2613, 261A..266F	106	L2/19-270		Moore, Lisa (2019-10-07), "E.1.1.1", UTC #160 Minutes
3.0	U+2619	1	L2/98-215	N1748	Everson, Michael (1998-05-25), Additional signature mark characters for the UCS
3.0	U+2619	1	L2/98-281R (pdf, html)		Aliprand, Joan (1998-07-31), "Signature Marks (IV.C.7)", Unconfirmed Minutes – UTC #77 & NCITS Subgroup L2 # 174 JOINT MEETING, Redmond, WA -- July 29-31, 1998
3.0	U+2619	1	L2/98-292R (pdf, html, Figure 1)		"2.7", Comments on proposals to add characters from ISO standards developed by ISO/TC 46/SC 4, 1998-08-19
3.0	U+2619	1	L2/98-292	N1840	"2.7", Comments on proposals to add characters from ISO standards developed by ISO/TC 46/SC 4, 1998-08-25
3.0	U+2619	1	L2/98-301	N1847	Everson, Michael (1998-09-12), Responses to NCITS/L2 and Unicode Consortium comments on numerous proposals
3.0	U+2619	1	L2/98-372	N1884R2 (pdf, doc)	Whistler, Ken; et al. (1998-09-22), Additional Characters for the UCS
3.0	U+2619	1	L2/98-329	N1920	Combined PDAM registration and consideration ballot on WD for ISO/IEC 10646-1/Amd. 30, AMENDMENT 30: Additional Latin and other characters, 1998-10-28
3.0	U+2619	1	L2/99-010	N1903 (pdf, html, doc)	Umamaheswaran, V. S. (1998-12-30), "8.1.5.1", Minutes of WG 2 meeting 35, London, U.K.; 1998-09-21--25
3.0	U+2670..2671	2		N1719	Proposal to add Syriac crosses to miscellaneous symbols, 1998-03-06
3.0	U+2670..2671	2	L2/98-286	N1703	Umamaheswaran, V. S.; Ksar, Mike (1998-07-02), "8.24", Unconfirmed Meeting Minutes, WG 2 Meeting #34, Redmond, WA, USA; 1998-03-16--20
3.0	U+2670..2671	2	L2/98-321	N1905	Revised text of 10646-1/FPDAM 23, AMENDMENT 23: Bopomofo Extended and other characters, 1998-10-22
3.2	U+2616..2617	2	L2/99-238		Consolidated document containing 6 Japanese proposals, 1999-07-15
3.2	U+2616..2617	2		N2092	Addition of forty eight characters, 1999-09-13
3.2	U+2616..2617	2	L2/99-365		Moore, Lisa (1999-11-23), Comments on JCS Proposals
3.2	U+2616..2617	2	L2/99-260R		Moore, Lisa (2000-02-07), "JCS Proposals", Minutes of the UTC/L2 meeting in Mission Viejo, October 26-28, 1999
3.2	U+2616..2617	2	L2/00-297	N2257	Sato, T. K. (2000-09-04), JIS X 0213 symbols part-1
3.2	U+2616..2617	2	L2/00-342	N2278	Sato, T. K.; Everson, Michael; Whistler, Ken; Freytag, Asmus (2000-09-20), Ad hoc Report on Japan feedback N2257 and N2258
3.2	U+2616..2617	2	L2/01-050	N2253	Umamaheswaran, V. S. (2001-01-21), "7.16 JIS X0213 Symbols", Minutes of the SC2/WG2 meeting in Athens, September 2000
3.2	U+2616..2617	2	L2/01-114	N2328	Summary of Voting on SC 2 N 3503, ISO/IEC 10646-1: 2000/PDAM 1, 2001-03-09
3.2	U+2672..267D	12	L2/98-025	N1661	Everson, Michael (1997-12-08), Proposal to encode two ecological symbols in ISO/IEC 10646
3.2	U+2672..267D	12	L2/98-070		Aliprand, Joan; Winkler, Arnold, "4.C.4", Minutes of the joint UTC and L2 meeting from the meeting in Cupertino, February 25-27, 1998
3.2	U+2672..267D	12	L2/98-286	N1703	Umamaheswaran, V. S.; Ksar, Mike (1998-07-02), "8.7", Unconfirmed Meeting Minutes, WG 2 Meeting #34, Redmond, WA, USA; 1998-03-16--20
3.2	U+2672..267D	12	L2/00-292	N2240	Everson, Michael; Freytag, Asmus (2000-08-27), Proposal to add 8 recycling characters to the UCS
3.2	U+2672..267D	12	L2/01-005	N2310	Everson, Michael; Freytag, Asmus (2000-12-22), Background information on Recycling Symbols
3.2	U+2672..267D	12	L2/01-050	N2253	Umamaheswaran, V. S. (2001-01-21), "7.9 Proposal to add 8 recycling symbols", Minutes of the SC2/WG2 meeting in Athens, September 2000
3.2	U+2672..267D	12	L2/00-324		Moore, Lisa (2001-01-29), "Motion 85-M8", Minutes from UTC #85, San Diego
3.2	U+2672..267D	12	L2/01-146	N2342	Everson, Michael; Freytag, Asmus (2001-04-02), Background information on Recycling Symbols
3.2	U+2672..267D	12	L2/01-012R		Moore, Lisa (2001-05-21), "Motion 86-M15 and 86-M16", Minutes UTC #86 in Mountain View, Jan 2001
3.2	U+2672..267D	12	L2/01-227		Whistler, Ken (2001-05-22), "ITEM 1", WG2 Consent Docket for UTC #87
3.2	U+2672..267D	12	L2/01-184R		Moore, Lisa (2001-06-18), "Motion 87-M16, ITEM 1", Minutes from the UTC/L2 meeting
3.2	U+2672..267D	12	L2/01-344	N2353 (pdf, doc)	Umamaheswaran, V. S. (2001-09-09), "Resolution M40.5", Minutes from SC2/WG2 meeting #40 -- Mountain View, April 2001
3.2	U+2672..267D	12	L2/02-154	N2403	Umamaheswaran, V. S. (2002-04-22), "7.7", Draft minutes of WG 2 meeting 41, Hotel Phoenix, Singapore, 2001-10-15/19
3.2	U+2672..267D	12	L2/10-088	N3776	DoCoMo Input on Emoji, 2010-03-08
3.2	U+2680..2689	10	L2/01-142 (Note: Refer to the history section of the Miscellaneous Mathematical Symbols-B block for additional math-related documents)	N2336	Beeton, Barbara; Freytag, Asmus; Ion, Patrick (2001-04-02), Additional Mathematical Symbols
3.2	U+2680..2689	10	L2/01-156	N2356	Freytag, Asmus (2001-04-03), Additional Mathematical Characters (Draft 10)
3.2	U+2680..2689	10	L2/01-344	N2353 (pdf, doc)	Umamaheswaran, V. S. (2001-09-09), "7.7 Mathematical Symbols", Minutes from SC2/WG2 meeting #40 -- Mountain View, April 2001
3.2	U+2680..2689	10	L2/16-036		Davis, Mark (2016-01-24), Nameslist.txt suggestions
4.0	U+2614..2615, 2690..2691, 26A0..26A1	6	L2/99-353	N2056	"3", Amendment of the part concerning the Korean characters in ISO/IEC 10646-1:1998 amendment 5, 1999-07-29
4.0	U+2614..2615, 2690..2691, 26A0..26A1	6	L2/99-380		Proposal for a New Work item (NP) to amend the Korean part in ISO/IEC 10646-1:1993, 1999-12-07
4.0	U+2614..2615, 2690..2691, 26A0..26A1	6	L2/99-380.3		Annex B, Special characters compatible with KPS 9566-97 (To be extended), 1999-12-07
4.0	U+2614..2615, 2690..2691, 26A0..26A1	6	L2/00-084	N2182	"3", Amendment of the part concerning the Korean characters in ISO/IEC 10646-1:1998 amendment 5 (Cover page and outline of proposal L2/99-380), 1999-12-07
4.0	U+2614..2615, 2690..2691, 26A0..26A1	6	L2/99-382		Whistler, Ken (1999-12-09), "2.3", Comments to accompany a U.S. NO vote on JTC1 N5999, SC2 N3393, New Work item proposal (NP) for an amendment of the Korean part of ISO/IEC 10646-1:1993
4.0	U+2614..2615, 2690..2691, 26A0..26A1	6	L2/00-066	N2170 (pdf, doc)	"3", The technical justification of the proposal to amend the Korean character part of ISO/IEC 10646-1 (proposed addition of 79 symbolic characters), 2000-02-10
4.0	U+2614..2615, 2690..2691, 26A0..26A1	6	L2/00-073	N2167	Karlsson, Kent (2000-03-02), Comments on DPRK New Work Item proposal on Korean characters
4.0	U+2614..2615, 2690..2691, 26A0..26A1	6	L2/00-285	N2244	Proposal for the Addition of 82 Symbols to ISO/IEC 10646-1:2000, 2000-08-10
4.0	U+2614..2615, 2690..2691, 26A0..26A1	6	L2/00-291		Everson, Michael (2000-08-30), Comments to Korean proposals (L2/00-284 - 289)
4.0	U+2614..2615, 2690..2691, 26A0..26A1	6		N2282	Report of the meeting of the Korean script ad hoc group, 2000-09-21
4.0	U+2614..2615, 2690..2691, 26A0..26A1	6	L2/01-349	N2374R	Proposal to add of 70 symbols to ISO/IEC 10646-1:2000, 2001-09-03
4.0	U+2614..2615, 2690..2691, 26A0..26A1	6	L2/01-387	N2390	Kim, Kyongsok (2001-10-13), ROK's Comments about DPRK's proposal, WG2 N 2374, to add 70 symbols to ISO/IEC 10646-1:2000
4.0	U+2614..2615, 2690..2691, 26A0..26A1	6	L2/01-388	N2392	Kim, Kyongsok (2001-10-16), A Report of Korean Script ad hoc group meeting on Oct. 15, 2001
4.0	U+2614..2615, 2690..2691, 26A0..26A1	6	L2/01-420		Whistler, Ken (2001-10-30), "f. Miscellaneous symbol additions from DPRK standard", WG2 (Singapore) Resolution Consent Docket for UTC
4.0	U+2614..2615, 2690..2691, 26A0..26A1	6	L2/01-458	N2407	Umamaheswaran, V. S. (2001-11-16), Request to Korean ad hoc group to generate mapping tables between ROK and DPRK national standards
4.0	U+2614..2615, 2690..2691, 26A0..26A1	6	L2/02-372	N2453 (pdf, doc)	Umamaheswaran, V. S. (2002-10-30), "M42.14", Unconfirmed minutes of WG 2 meeting 42
4.0	U+2614..2615, 2690..2691, 26A0..26A1	6	L2/17-401		Ad Hoc recommendations for Emoji 6, 2017-10-26
4.0	U+2614..2615, 2690..2691, 26A0..26A1	6	L2/17-362		Moore, Lisa (2018-02-02), "Consensus 153-C34", UTC #153 Minutes
4.0	U+268A..268F	6	L2/01-283	N2363	Cook, Richard; Everson, Michael; Jenkins, John H. (2001-07-25), Proposal to add monogram, digram and hexagram characters to the UCS
4.0	U+268A..268F	6	L2/01-295R		Moore, Lisa (2001-11-06), "Motion 88-M4", Minutes from the UTC/L2 meeting #88
4.0	U+268A..268F	6	L2/01-405R		Moore, Lisa (2001-12-12), "Consensus 89-C24", Minutes from the UTC/L2 meeting in Mountain View, November 6-9, 2001, "The UTC confirms the reassignment of the Yijing Monograms to 268A..268F."
4.0	U+268A..268F	6	L2/02-154	N2403	Umamaheswaran, V. S. (2002-04-22), "7.3", Draft minutes of WG 2 meeting 41, Hotel Phoenix, Singapore, 2001-10-15/19
4.1	U+2618, 267E..267F, 269B..269C	5	L2/03-214		Whistler, Ken (2003-06-30), Code point conflict for new symbols
4.1	U+2618, 267E..267F, 269B..269C	5	L2/03-163R2	N2586R	Everson, Michael (2003-09-04), Proposal to encode five miscellaneous symbols in the UCS
4.1	U+2618, 267E..267F, 269B..269C	5	L2/15-050R		Davis, Mark; et al. (2015-01-29), Additional variation selectors for emoji
4.1	U+2618, 267E..267F, 269B..269C	5	L2/15-301		Pournader, Roozbeh (2015-11-01), A proposal for 278 standardized variation sequences for emoji
4.1	U+2618, 267E..267F, 269B..269C	5	L2/17-343		Álvarez, Onelia; Alonso, Gonzalo (2017-02-03), Infinity Emoji Submission
4.1	U+2618, 267E..267F, 269B..269C	5	L2/17-380R		Emoji Subcommittee Report Q3 2017, 2017-10-23
4.1	U+2618, 267E..267F, 269B..269C	5	L2/17-401		Ad Hoc recommendations for Emoji 6, 2017-10-26
4.1	U+2618, 267E..267F, 269B..269C	5	L2/17-362		Moore, Lisa (2018-02-02), "Consensus 153-C34", UTC #153 Minutes
4.1	U+2692..269A	9	L2/03-354	N2655	Freytag, Asmus (2003-10-10), Proposal -- Symbols used in Dictionaries
4.1	U+2692..269A	9	L2/03-356R2		Moore, Lisa (2003-10-22), "Consensus 97-C15", UTC #97 Minutes
4.1	U+2692..269A	9	L2/15-301		Pournader, Roozbeh (2015-11-01), A proposal for 278 standardized variation sequences for emoji
4.1	U+2692..269A	9	L2/16-361		Pournader, Roozbeh; Felt, Doug (2016-11-07), Add text and emoji standardized variation sequences for 96 symbols
4.1	U+26A2..26B1	16	L2/03-120	N2580	Everson, Michael (2003-03-26), Proposal to encode symbols for genealogy and gender studies in the UCS
4.1	U+26A2..26B1	16	L2/03-164	N2587	Everson, Michael (2003-05-24), Revised proposal to encode symbols for genealogy and gender studies in the UCS
4.1	U+26A2..26B1	16	L2/03-364	N2663	Everson, Michael (2003-10-17), Second revised proposal to encode symbols for genealogy and gender studies in the UCS
4.1	U+26A2..26B1	16	L2/03-356R2		Moore, Lisa (2003-10-22), "Consensus 97-C11", UTC #97 Minutes
4.1	U+26A2..26B1	16	L2/11-438	N4182	Edberg, Peter (2011-12-22), Emoji Variation Sequences (Revision of L2/11-429)
4.1	U+26A2..26B1	16	L2/15-301		Pournader, Roozbeh (2015-11-01), A proposal for 278 standardized variation sequences for emoji
5.0	U+26B2	1	L2/04-406		Freytag, Asmus; Sargent, Murray; Beeton, Barbara; Carlisle, David (2004-11-15), Progress report on Mathematical Symbols
5.0	U+26B2	1	L2/04-410		Freytag, Asmus (2004-11-18), Twenty six mathematical characters
5.1	U+269D	1	L2/05-318		Lazrek, Azzeddine (2005-10-24), Proposals for Unicode Consortium [Arabic mathematical symbols]
5.1	U+269D	1	L2/05-320		Lazrek, Azzeddine (2005-07-10), Arabic Mathematical Diverse Symbols, Additional characters proposed to Unicode
5.1	U+269D	1	L2/06-125	N3086-1, N3086	Lazrek, Azzeddine (2006-03-30), Diverse Arabic Mathematical Symbols
5.1	U+269D	1	L2/06-108		Moore, Lisa (2006-05-25), "C.16", UTC #107 Minutes
5.1	U+269D	1		N3103 (pdf, doc)	Umamaheswaran, V. S. (2006-08-25), "8.14", Unconfirmed minutes of WG 2 meeting 48, Mountain View, CA, USA; 2006-04-24/27
5.1	U+269D	1		N3153 (pdf, doc)	Umamaheswaran, V. S. (2007-02-16), "M49.7", Unconfirmed minutes of WG 2 meeting 49 AIST, Akihabara, Tokyo, Japan; 2006-09-25/29
5.1	U+269D	1	L2/09-185R2	N3674	Lazrek, Azzeddine; Anderson, Deborah (2009-05-14), Proposal for PENTAGRAM characters
5.1	U+26B3..26BC	10	L2/06-171	N3110	Faulks, David (2006-05-09), Proposal to add some Western Astrology Symbols to the UCS
5.1	U+26B3..26BC	10	L2/06-108		Moore, Lisa (2006-05-25), "C.19", UTC #107 Minutes
5.1	U+26B3..26BC	10		N3153 (pdf, doc)	Umamaheswaran, V. S. (2007-02-16), "M49.6", Unconfirmed minutes of WG 2 meeting 49 AIST, Akihabara, Tokyo, Japan; 2006-09-25/29
5.1	U+26C0..26C3	4	L2/04-163	N2760	Everson, Michael (2004-05-18), Proposal to encode dominoes and other game symbols in the UCS
5.1	U+26C0..26C3	4	L2/06-288		Pentzlin, Karl (2006-08-06), Comments on L2/04-163 - Domino tiles and other game symbols
5.1	U+26C0..26C3	4	L2/06-306	N3147	Everson, Michael (2006-09-12), Proposal to encode Mahjong, Domino, and Draughts symbols in the UCS
5.1	U+26C0..26C3	4	L2/07-171	N3171	Chen, Zhuang; Everson, Michael; Lu, Qin; Sekiguchi, Masuhiro; Shih-Shyeng, Tseng; Wei, Lin-Mei; West, Andrew (2006-09-27), Proposal to encode Mahjong, Domino, and Draughts symbols in the UCS
5.1	U+26C0..26C3	4		N3153 (pdf, doc)	Umamaheswaran, V. S. (2007-02-16), "M49.14", Unconfirmed minutes of WG 2 meeting 49 AIST, Akihabara, Tokyo, Japan; 2006-09-25/29
5.1	U+26C0..26C3	4	L2/06-324R2		Moore, Lisa (2006-11-29), "Consensus 109-C3", UTC #109 Minutes
5.2	U+269E..269F, 26BE..26BF, 26C4..26CD, 26CF..26E1, 26E3, 26E8..26FF	58		N3353 (pdf, doc)	Umamaheswaran, V. S. (2007-10-10), "M51.32", Unconfirmed minutes of WG 2 meeting 51 Hanzhou, China; 2007-04-24/27
5.2	U+269E..269F, 26BE..26BF, 26C4..26CD, 26CF..26E1, 26E3, 26E8..26FF	58	L2/07-259		Suignard, Michel (2007-08-02), Japanese TV Symbols
5.2	U+269E..269F, 26BE..26BF, 26C4..26CD, 26CF..26E1, 26E3, 26E8..26FF	58	L2/07-391	N3341	Suignard, Michel (2007-09-18), Japanese TV Symbols
5.2	U+269E..269F, 26BE..26BF, 26C4..26CD, 26CF..26E1, 26E3, 26E8..26FF	58	L2/08-077R2	N3397	Suignard, Michel (2008-03-11), Japanese TV symbols
5.2	U+269E..269F, 26BE..26BF, 26C4..26CD, 26CF..26E1, 26E3, 26E8..26FF	58	L2/08-128		Iancu, Laurențiu (2008-03-22), Names and allocation of some Japanese TV symbols from N3397
5.2	U+269E..269F, 26BE..26BF, 26C4..26CD, 26CF..26E1, 26E3, 26E8..26FF	58	L2/08-158		Pentzlin, Karl (2008-04-16), Comments on L2/08-077R2 "Japanese TV Symbols"
5.2	U+269E..269F, 26BE..26BF, 26C4..26CD, 26CF..26E1, 26E3, 26E8..26FF	58	L2/08-188	N3468	Sekiguchi, Masahiro (2008-04-22), Collected comments on Japanese TV Symbols (WG2 N3397)
5.2	U+269E..269F, 26BE..26BF, 26C4..26CD, 26CF..26E1, 26E3, 26E8..26FF	58	L2/08-077R3	N3469	Suignard, Michel (2008-04-23), Japanese TV symbols
5.2	U+269E..269F, 26BE..26BF, 26C4..26CD, 26CF..26E1, 26E3, 26E8..26FF	58	L2/08-215		Pentzlin, Karl (2008-05-07), Comments on L2/08-077R2 "Japanese TV Symbols"
5.2	U+269E..269F, 26BE..26BF, 26C4..26CD, 26CF..26E1, 26E3, 26E8..26FF	58	L2/08-289		Pentzlin, Karl (2008-08-05), Proposal to rename and reassign some Japanese TV Symbols from L2/08-077R3
5.2	U+269E..269F, 26BE..26BF, 26C4..26CD, 26CF..26E1, 26E3, 26E8..26FF	58	L2/08-292		Stötzner, Andreas (2008-08-06), Improvement suggestions for n3469
5.2	U+269E..269F, 26BE..26BF, 26C4..26CD, 26CF..26E1, 26E3, 26E8..26FF	58	L2/08-307		Scherer, Markus (2008-08-08), Feedback on the Japanese TV Symbols Proposal (L2/08-077R3)
5.2	U+269E..269F, 26BE..26BF, 26C4..26CD, 26CF..26E1, 26E3, 26E8..26FF	58	L2/08-318	N3453 (pdf, doc)	Umamaheswaran, V. S. (2008-08-13), "M52.14", Unconfirmed minutes of WG 2 meeting 52
5.2	U+269E..269F, 26BE..26BF, 26C4..26CD, 26CF..26E1, 26E3, 26E8..26FF	58	L2/08-253R2		Moore, Lisa (2008-08-19), "B.15.3", UTC #116 Minutes
5.2	U+269E..269F, 26BE..26BF, 26C4..26CD, 26CF..26E1, 26E3, 26E8..26FF	58	L2/08-161R2		Moore, Lisa (2008-11-05), "Consensus 115-C17", UTC #115 Minutes, "Approve 186 Japanese TV symbols for encoding in a future version of the standard."
5.2	U+269E..269F, 26BE..26BF, 26C4..26CD, 26CF..26E1, 26E3, 26E8..26FF	58	L2/08-361		Moore, Lisa (2008-12-02), "Consensus 117-C23", UTC #117 Minutes, "Change the name of U+26EF LIGHTHOUSE to U+26EF MAP SYMBOL FOR LIGHTHOUSE."
5.2	U+269E..269F, 26BE..26BF, 26C4..26CD, 26CF..26E1, 26E3, 26E8..26FF	58	L2/09-064		Scherer, Markus (2009-01-29), Request to change some ARIB/AMD6 character names and a code point
5.2	U+269E..269F, 26BE..26BF, 26C4..26CD, 26CF..26E1, 26E3, 26E8..26FF	58	L2/11-438	N4182	Edberg, Peter (2011-12-22), Emoji Variation Sequences (Revision of L2/11-429)
5.2	U+269E..269F, 26BE..26BF, 26C4..26CD, 26CF..26E1, 26E3, 26E8..26FF	58	L2/15-050R		Davis, Mark; et al. (2015-01-29), Additional variation selectors for emoji
5.2	U+269E..269F, 26BE..26BF, 26C4..26CD, 26CF..26E1, 26E3, 26E8..26FF	58	L2/15-201		Allow emoji modifiers for 2 existing and 1 proposed characters, 2015-07-31
5.2	U+269E..269F, 26BE..26BF, 26C4..26CD, 26CF..26E1, 26E3, 26E8..26FF	58	L2/15-187		Moore, Lisa (2015-08-11), "Consensus 144-C17", UTC #144 Minutes, "Give emoji modifier status secondary to U+26F9 PERSON WITH BALL and U+1F3CB WEIGHT LIFTER, for the next revision of UTR #51."
5.2	U+269E..269F, 26BE..26BF, 26C4..26CD, 26CF..26E1, 26E3, 26E8..26FF	58	L2/15-301		Pournader, Roozbeh (2015-11-01), A proposal for 278 standardized variation sequences for emoji
5.2	U+269E..269F, 26BE..26BF, 26C4..26CD, 26CF..26E1, 26E3, 26E8..26FF	58	L2/16-228		Constable, Peter; Safran-Aasen, Judy; Coady, Michele; Bjornstad, Shelley (2016-08-04), Proposed Additions to Emoji_Modifier_Base
5.2	U+269E..269F, 26BE..26BF, 26C4..26CD, 26CF..26E1, 26E3, 26E8..26FF	58	L2/16-281		Burge, Jeremy; Hunt, Paul (2016-10-17), Emoji Glyph Updates
5.2	U+269E..269F, 26BE..26BF, 26C4..26CD, 26CF..26E1, 26E3, 26E8..26FF	58	L2/23-036		Daniel, Jennifer (2022-07-14), Chain with Broken Link Proposal [Affects U+26D3]
5.2	U+269E..269F, 26BE..26BF, 26C4..26CD, 26CF..26E1, 26E3, 26E8..26FF	58	L2/23-037R		Daniel, Jennifer (2023-01-25), Recommendations for ZWJ Sequences, Unicode 15.1 [Affects U+26D3]
5.2	U+269E..269F, 26BE..26BF, 26C4..26CD, 26CF..26E1, 26E3, 26E8..26FF	58	L2/23-005		Constable, Peter (2023-02-01), "G.1.1 Emoji 15.1 Recommendations", UTC #174 Minutes
5.2	U+26BD	1	L2/08-135		Pentzlin, Karl (2008-04-02), Proposal to encode a SOCCER BALL symbol
5.2	U+26BD	1	L2/08-253R2		Moore, Lisa (2008-08-19), "B.15.3", UTC #116 Minutes
5.2	U+26BD	1	L2/08-412	N3553 (pdf, doc)	Umamaheswaran, V. S. (2008-11-05), "M53.08", Unconfirmed minutes of WG 2 meeting 53
6.0	U+26CE	1	L2/08-253R2		Moore, Lisa (2008-08-19), "B.15.3", UTC #116 Minutes
6.0	U+26CE	1	L2/09-025R2	N3582 (Note: Japanese translation of N3582 is available as N3621)	Scherer, Markus; Davis, Mark; Momoi, Kat; Tong, Darick; Kida, Yasuo; Edberg, Peter (2009-03-05), Proposal for Encoding Emoji Symbols
6.0	U+26CE	1	L2/09-026R	N3583	Scherer, Markus; Davis, Mark; Momoi, Kat; Tong, Darick; Kida, Yasuo; Edberg, Peter (2009-02-06), Emoji Symbols Proposed for New Encoding
6.0	U+26CE	1	L2/09-027R2	N3681	Scherer, Markus (2009-09-17), Emoji Symbols: Background Data
6.0	U+26CE	1	L2/10-132		Scherer, Markus; Davis, Mark; Momoi, Kat; Tong, Darick; Kida, Yasuo; Edberg, Peter (2010-04-27), Emoji Symbols: Background Data
6.0	U+26CE	1	L2/22-229R		Leroy, Robin; Davis, Mark (2022-10-28), Proposed changes to Unicode properties and reports for source code handling, "Add to the file emoji-variation-sequences.txt any code points from the following set that are not already in it..."
6.0	U+26CE	1	L2/22-241		Constable, Peter (2022-11-09), "Consensus 173-C29", Approved Minutes of UTC Meeting 173, "Accept the proposals in L2/22-229R"
6.0	U+26E2	1	L2/09-208		Anderson, Deborah; Iancu, Laurențiu; Sargent, Murray (2009-05-10), Preliminary Proposal to Encode Characters from the STIX PUA Collection
6.0	U+26E2	1	L2/09-261		Iancu, Laurențiu; Sargent, Murray (2009-07-31), Preliminary proposal to encode characters from the STIX PUA collection, Part 1
6.0	U+26E2	1	L2/09-262		Anderson, Deborah; Iancu, Laurențiu; Sargent, Murray (2009-07-31), Preliminary proposal to encode characters from the STIX PUA collection, Part 2
6.0	U+26E2	1	L2/09-300	N3672	Iancu, Laurențiu; Sargent, Murray (2009-08-14), Proposal to encode astronomical symbol for Uranus
6.0	U+26E2	1	L2/09-304		Anderson, Deborah (2009-08-15), "T.2. Miscellaneous Symbols", US Position on PDAM 8
6.0	U+26E2	1	L2/09-225R		Moore, Lisa (2009-08-17), "120-C22", UTC #120 / L2 #217 Minutes
6.0	U+26E2	1		N3703 (pdf, doc)	Umamaheswaran, V. S. (2010-04-13), "M55.9g", Unconfirmed minutes of WG 2 meeting no. 55, Tokyo 2009-10-26/30
6.0	U+26E4..26E7	4	L2/09-185R2	N3674	Lazrek, Azzeddine; Anderson, Deborah (2009-05-14), Proposal for PENTAGRAM characters
6.0	U+26E4..26E7	4	L2/09-104		Moore, Lisa (2009-05-20), "D.2", UTC #119 / L2 #216 Minutes
6.0	U+26E4..26E7	4		N3703 (pdf, doc)	Umamaheswaran, V. S. (2010-04-13), "M55.9a", Unconfirmed minutes of WG 2 meeting no. 55, Tokyo 2009-10-26/30
6.0	U+26E4..26E7	4	L2/09-335R		Moore, Lisa (2009-11-10), "Consensus 121-C13", UTC #121 / L2 #218 Minutes

== See also ==
- Unicode Symbols
- Apple Symbols – typeface that supports this character set.
- Astronomical symbols
- Cultural, political, and religious symbols in Unicode
- Wingdings
- Semi graphical characters
