= Playing card suit =

Categories into which the cards of a deck are divided

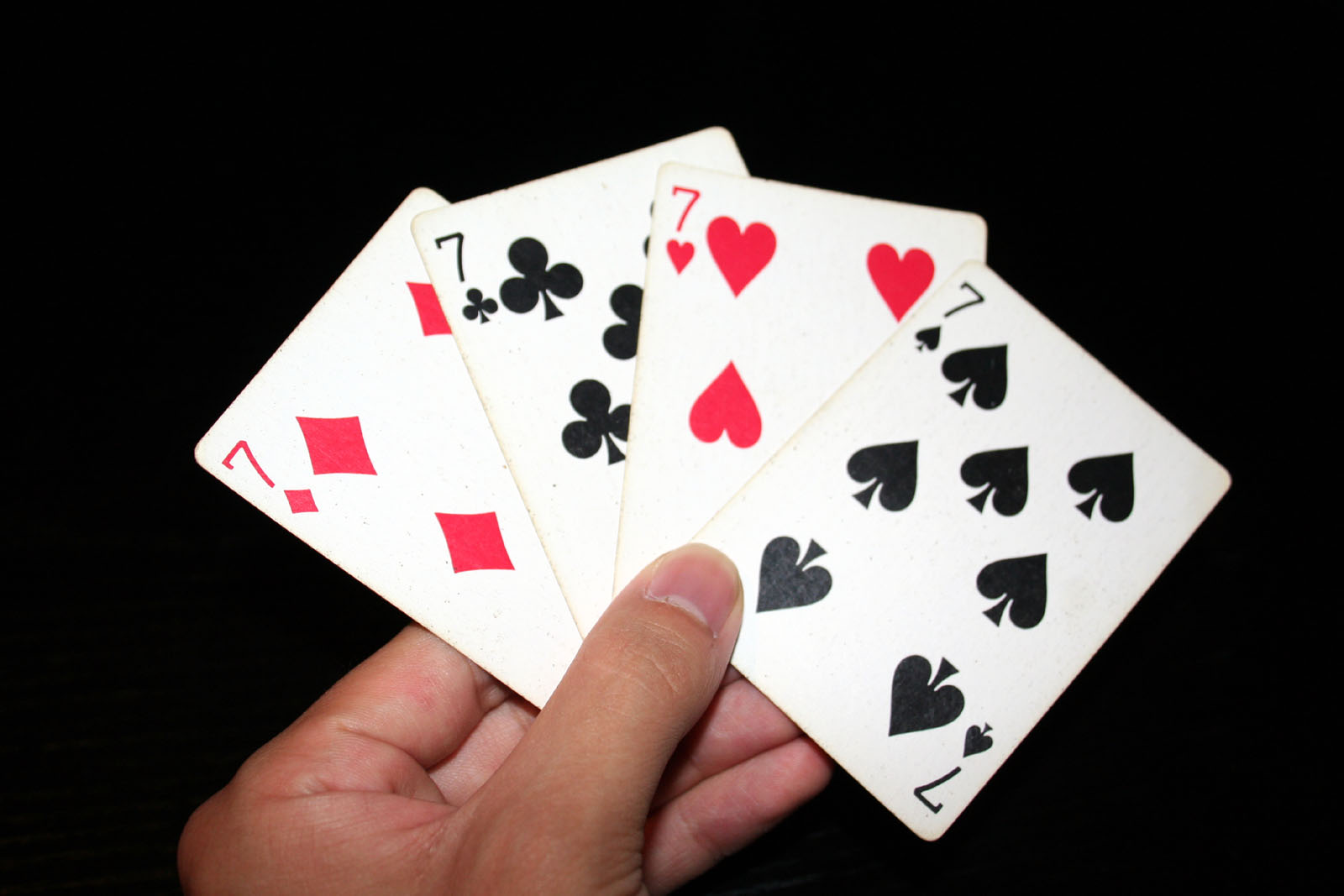
The four French card suits used in the English-speaking world: diamonds (♦), clubs (♣), hearts (♥) and spades (♠)

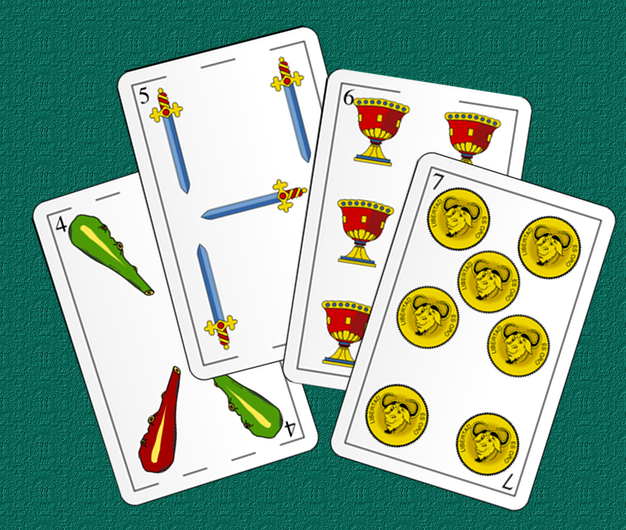
Traditional Spanish suits – clubs, swords, cups and coins – are found in Spain, as well as Hispanic America, Italy, parts of France, and the Philippines

In playing cards, a suit is one of the categories into which the cards of a deck are divided. Most often, each card bears one of several pips (symbols) showing to which suit it belongs; the suit may alternatively or additionally be indicated by the color printed on the card. The rank for each card is determined by the number of pips on it, except on face cards. Ranking indicates which cards within a suit are better, higher or more valuable than others, whereas there is no order between the suits unless defined in the rules of a specific card game. In most decks, there is exactly one card of any given rank in any given suit. A deck may include special cards that belong to no suit, often called jokers.

While English-speaking countries traditionally use cards with the French suits of clubs, spades, hearts and diamonds, many other countries have their own traditional suits. Much of central Europe uses the Germanic suits of acorns, leaves, hearts and bells; Spain and parts of Italy and South America use the Latin suits of swords, batons, cups and coins; German Switzerland uses the Swiss suits of acorns, shields, yellow roses and bells. Asian countries such as China and Japan also have their own traditional suits. Tarot card packs have a set of distinct picture cards alongside the traditional four suits.

== History ==
Modern Western playing cards are generally divided into two or three general suit-systems. The older Latin suits are subdivided into the Italian and Spanish suit-systems. The younger Germanic suits are subdivided into the German and Swiss suit-systems. The French suits are a derivative of the German suits but are generally considered a separate system.

=== Origin and development of the Latin suits ===
The earliest card games were trick-taking games and the invention of suits increased the level of strategy and depth in these games. A card of one suit cannot beat a card from another regardless of its rank. The concept of suits predates playing cards and can be found in Chinese dice and domino games such as Tien Gow.

Chinese money-suited cards are believed to be the oldest ancestor to the Latin suit system. The money-suit system is based on denominations of currency: Coins, Strings of Coins, Myriads of Strings (or of coins), and Tens of Myriads. Old Chinese coins had holes in the middle to allow them to be strung together. A string of coins could easily be misinterpreted as a stick to those unfamiliar with them.

By then the Islamic world had spread into Central Asia and had contacted China, and had adopted playing cards. The Muslims renamed the suit of myriads as cups; this may have been due to seeing a Chinese character for "myriad" (萬) upside-down. The Chinese numeral character for Ten (十) on the Tens of Myriads suit may have inspired the Muslim suit of swords. Another clue linking these Chinese, Muslim, and European cards are the ranking of certain suits. In many early Chinese games like Madiao, the suit of coins was in reverse order so that the lower ones beat the higher ones. In the Indo-Persian game of Ganjifa, half the suits were also inverted, including a suit of coins. This was also true for the European games of Tarot and Ombre. The inverting of suits had no purpose in terms of play but was an artifact from the earliest games.

These Turko-Arabic cards, called Kanjifa, used the suits coins, clubs, cups, and swords, but the clubs represented polo sticks; Europeans changed that suit, as polo was an obscure sport to them.

The Latin suits are coins, clubs, cups, and swords. They are the earliest suit-system in Europe, and were adopted from the cards imported from Mamluk Egypt and Moorish Granada in the 1370s.

There are four types of Latin suits: Italian, Spanish, Portuguese, (Note: "Portuguese" is slightly misleading nomenclature. The suit system may have originated in Catalonia and spread out through the western Mediterranean before being replaced by the "Spanish" system. The association with Portugal comes from the fact that they continued to use it until completely going over to French suits at the beginning of the 20th century.) and an extinct archaic type. The systems can be distinguished by the pips of their long suits: swords and clubs.

- Northern Italian swords are curved outward and the clubs appear to be batons. They intersect one another.
- Southern Italian and Spanish swords are straight, and the clubs appear to be knobbly cudgels. They do not cross each other (except in the three of clubs).
- Portuguese pips are like the Spanish, but they intersect like Northern Italian ones. They sometimes have dragons on the aces. This system lingers on only in the Tarocco Siciliano and the Unsun Karuta and Komatsufuda of Japan. Unsun Karuta additionally has a fifth Guru suit (circular whirls).
- The archaic system (Note: Probably associated with the Duchy of Ferrara and likely abandoned after the 15th century.) is like the Northern Italian one, but the swords are curved inward so they touch each other without intersecting.
- Minchiate (a game that used a 97-card deck) used a mixed system of Italian clubs and Portuguese swords.

Despite a long history of trade with China, Japan was not introduced to playing cards until the arrival of the Portuguese in the 1540s. (Note: The only users of Chinese cards during the Edo period were the expat community in Nagasaki.) Early locally made cards, Karuta, were very similar to Portuguese decks. Increasing restrictions by the Tokugawa shogunate on gambling, card playing, and general foreign influence, resulted in the Hanafuda deck that today is used most often for fishing-type games and the Komatsufuda and Kabufuda decks that are used for gambling. In hanafuda, the role of rank and suit in organizing cards became switched, so the deck has 12 suits, each representing a month of the year, and each suit has 4 cards, most often two normal, one Ribbon and one Special (though August, November and December each differ uniquely from this convention). In komatsufuda and kabufuda, the designs of the suits became much more abstract; kabufuda eventually lost all distinctions of suit, with the deck having four identical copies of each rank. Unsun karuta did not face the same restrictions and instead developed an additional suit and additional ranks.

=== Invention of German and French suits ===
During the 15th-century, manufacturers in German speaking lands experimented with various new suit systems to replace the Latin suits. One early deck had five suits, the Latin ones with an extra suit of shields. The Swiss-Germans developed their own suits of shields, roses, acorns, and bells around 1450. Instead of roses and shields, the Germans settled with hearts and leaves around 1460. The French derived their suits of trèfles (clovers or clubs ♣), carreaux (tiles or diamonds ♦), cœurs (hearts ♥), and piques (pikes or spades ♠) from the German suits around 1480. French suits correspond closely with German suits with the exception of the tiles with the bells but there is one early French deck that had crescents instead of tiles. The English names for the French suits of clubs and spades may simply have been carried over from the older Latin suits.

=== Tarot cards ===
Beginning around 1440 in northern Italy, some decks started to include an extra suit of (usually) 21 numbered cards known as trionfi or trumps, to play tarot card games. Always included in tarot decks is one card, the Fool or Excuse, which may be part of the trump suit depending on the game or region. These cards do not have pips or face cards like the other suits. Most tarot decks used for games come with French suits but Italian suits are still used in Piedmont, Bologna, and pockets of Switzerland. A few Sicilian towns use the Portuguese-suited Tarocco Siciliano, the only deck of its kind left in Europe.

The esoteric use of Tarot packs emerged in France in the late 18th century, since when special packs intended for divination have been produced. These typically have the suits cups, pentacles (based on the suit of coins), wands (based on the suit of batons), and swords. The trump cards and Fool of traditional card playing packs were named the Major Arcana; the remaining cards, often embellished with occult images, were the Minor Arcana. Neither term is recognised by card players.

== Suits ==
=== Divination symbols ===
In divinatory, esoteric and occult tarot, the Minor Arcana, and the suits by extension, are believed to represent relatively mundane features of life. The court cards may represent the people whom one meets.

Each suit also has distinctive characteristics and connotations commonly held to be as follows:

Latin suit	Element	Class	Faculty
Wands, batons, clubs, staves	Fire	Artisans	Will and creativity
Swords, blades	Air	Nobility and military	Reason or logic, wisdom, and intellect
Cups, chalices, goblets, vessels	Water	Clergy	Spiritual matters, or emotions and love
Pentacles, coins, disks, rings	Earth	Merchants	Material matters, or possessions and career

=== Comparisons between suits ===
Origin	Suits												
Latin card suits
Italian (Note: Sample pips come from the Venetian pattern)	Clubs (Bastoni)	Cups (Coppe)	Swords (Spade)	Coins (Denari)									
Spanish (Note: Sample pips come from the Castilian pattern)	Clubs (Bastos)	Cups (Copas)	Swords (Espadas)	Coins (Oros)									
Portuguese	Clubs (Paus)	Cups (Copas)	Swords (Espadas)	Coins (Ouros)									
Comparison of German, Polish, French and Swiss suits (Note: The French suit system is generally considered to be separate from the German and Swiss due to its different set of face cards. However, when comparing only the pips, it is German in origin.)
Swiss-German (Note: There does not appear to be a single universal system of correspondences between Swiss-German and French suits. Cards combining the two suit systems are manufactured in different versions with different combinations of suits.)	Acorns (Note: Swiss-German: Eichel)(Eichel)	Shields (Note: Swiss-German: Schilten)(Schilten)	Roses (Note: Swiss-German: Rosen)(Rosen)	Bells (Note: Swiss-German: Schellen)(Schellen)									
German/Polish	Acorns (Note: German/Polish: Eichel/Żołądź (acorn), Ecker (beechnut), Hungarian: Makk (acorn), Czech: Žaludy (acorns))(Eichel/Żołądź ) /	Hearts (Note: German/Polish: Herz/Czerwień (heart), Rot (red), Hungarian: Piros (red), Czech: Srdce (heart), Červené (red))(Herz/Czerwień) /	Leaves (Note: German/Polish: Laub/Wino (leaves), Grün (green), Gras (grass), Blatt (leaf) Hungarian: Zöld (green), Czech: Listy (leaves), Zelené (green))(Blätter/Wino) /	Bells (Note: German/Polish: Schellen/Dzwonek (bells), Hungarian: Tök (pumpkin), Czech: Kule (balls))(Schellen/Dzwonek) /									
French	Clover (Clubs) (Note: The shape of the clubs symbol is believed to be an adaptation of the German suit of acorns. Clubs are also known as clovers, flowers and crosses. The French name for the suit is trèfles meaning clovers, the Italian name for the suit is fiori meaning flowers and the German name for the suit is Kreuz meaning cross.)(Trèfle)	Hearts (Cœur)	Pikes (Spades) (Note: In German-speaking countries the spade was the symbol associated with the blade of a spade. The English term spade originally did not refer to the tool but was derived from the Spanish word espada meaning sword from the Spanish suit. Those symbols were later changed to resemble the digging tool instead to avoid confusion. In German and Dutch the suit is alternatively named Schippen and schoppen respectively, meaning shovels.)(Piques)	Tiles (Diamonds) (Carreaux)									
Karuta suits
Komatsufuda	Clubs (パオ)	Cups (コツ)	Swords (イス)	Coins (オウル)									
Unsun Karuta	Clubs (パオ)	Cups (コツ)	Swords (イス)	Coins (オウル)	Guru (クル)								
Kabufuda/Hanafuda (Note: In Hanafuda, each of the 12 suits is associated with a month of the year. The traditional month associations differ from region to region. In modern usage, Korean decks switch the suits for November and December compared to the standard Japanese order.)	Clubs (パオ)	Pine (Note: Japanese: matsu (松, pine), Korean: 송학; 松鶴; songhak; lit. 'pine crane'. Associated with the month January.)(松)	Plum (Note: Japanese: ume (梅, plum blossom), Korean: 매조; 梅鳥; maejo; lit. 'plum bird'. Associated with the month February.)(梅)	Cherry (Note: Japanese: sakura (桜, cherry blossom), Korean: 벚꽃; beotkkot; lit. 'cherry blossom' or 사쿠라; sakura. Associated with the month March.)(桜)	Wisteria (Note: Japanese: fuji (藤, wisteria), Korean: 흑싸리; heugssali; lit. 'black bush clover'. Associated with the month April.)(藤)	Iris (Note: Japanese: ayame (菖蒲, iris) or kakitsubata (杜若, Iris laevigata), Korean: 난초; 蘭草; nancho; lit. 'orchid'. Associated with the month May.)(虹彩)	Peony (Note: Japanese: botan (牡丹, peony), Korean: 모란; 牡丹; moran; lit. 'peony'. Associated with the month June.)(牡丹)	Bush Clover (Note: Japanese: hagi (萩, bush clover), Korean: 홍싸리; hongssari; lit. 'red bush clover'. Associated with the month July.)(萩)	Susuki Grass (Note: Japanese: susuki (芒, Japanese silver grass) or bōzu (坊主, Buddhist monk, shorn head), Korean: 공산; 空山; gongsan; lit. 'empty mountain'. Associated with the month August.)(スズキ)	Chrysanthemum (Note: Japanese: kiku (菊, chrysanthemum), Korean: 국진; gukjin. Associated with the month September.)(菊)	Maple (Note: Japanese: momiji (紅葉, maple, red leaves), Korean: 단풍; 丹楓; danpung; lit. 'maple, autumn leaves'. Associated with the month October.)(カエデ)	Willow (Note: Japanese: yanagi (柳, willow) or ame (雨, rain), Korean: 비; bi; lit. 'rain'. Associated with the month November in Japan and December in Korea.)(柳)	Paulownia (Note: Japanese: kiri (桐, paulownia), Korean: 오동; odong; lit. 'paulownia'. Associated with the month December in Japan and November in Korea.)(キリ

== Suits in games with traditional decks ==
=== Trumps ===
In a large and popular category of trick-taking games, one suit may be designated in each deal to be trump and all cards of the trump suit rank above all non-trump cards, and automatically prevail over them, losing only to a higher trump if one is played to the same trick. Non-trump suits are called plain suits.

=== Special suits ===
Some games treat one or more suits as being special or different from the others. A simple example is Spades, which uses spades as a permanent trump suit. A less simple example is Hearts, which is a kind of point trick game in which the object is to avoid taking tricks containing hearts. With typical rules for Hearts (rules vary slightly) the queen of spades and the two of clubs (sometimes also the jack of diamonds) have special effects, with the result that all four suits have different strategic value. Tarot decks have a dedicated trump suit.

=== Chosen suits ===
Games of the Karnöffel Group have between one and four chosen suits, sometimes called selected suits or, misleadingly, trump suits. The chosen suits are typified by having a disrupted ranking and cards with varying privileges which may range from full to none and which may depend on the order they are played to the trick. For example, chosen Sevens may be unbeatable when led, but otherwise worthless. In Swedish Bräus some cards are even unplayable. In games where the number of chosen suits is less than four, the others are called unchosen suits and usually rank in their natural order.

=== Ranking of suits ===
Whist-style rules generally preclude the necessity of determining which of two cards of different suits has higher rank, because a card played on a card of a different suit either automatically wins or automatically loses depending on whether the new card is a trump. However, some card games also need to define relative suit rank. An example of this is in auction games such as bridge, where if one player wishes to bid to make some number of heart tricks and another to make the same number of diamond tricks, there must be a mechanism to determine which takes precedence in the bidding order.

There is no standard order for the four suits and so there are differing conventions among games that need a suit hierarchy. Examples of suit order are (from highest to lowest):

High → low				Games	Mnemonic
♠	♥	♦	♣	Bridge for bidding and scoring Poker occasionally Taiwanese version of Big Two	Alphabetical order reversed: S, H, D, C
♠	♥	♣	♦	Big Two outside Taiwan	1 tip, 2 halves, 3 leaves, 4 corners
♥	♦	♣	♠	Preferans only used for bidding Five Hundred for bidding and scoring Thirteen	
♥	♦	♠	♣	Préférence only used for bidding	
♣	♠	♥	♦	Skat for bidding (valued 12, 11, 10, 9) and to determine which Jack beats which in play Other European games such as Bruus	
♣	♠	♥	♦	Cego for determining highest card in certain situations	
♣	♥	♠	♦	Ninety-nine for scoring	3, 2, 1, 0 lobes

=== Pairing or ignoring suits ===
The pairing of suits is a vestigial remnant of Ganjifa, a game where half the suits were in reverse order, the lower cards beating the higher. In Ganjifa, progressive suits were called "strong" while inverted suits were called "weak". In Latin decks, the traditional division is between the long suits of swords and clubs and the round suits of cups and coins. This pairing can be seen in Ombre and Tarot card games. German and Swiss suits lack pairing but French suits maintained them and this can be seen in the game of Spoil Five.

In some games, such as blackjack, suits are ignored. In other games, such as Canasta, only the color (red or black) is relevant. In yet others, such as bridge, each of the suit pairings are distinguished.

In contract bridge, there are three ways to divide four suits into pairs: by color, by rank and by shape resulting in six possible suit combinations.

- Color is used to denote the red suits (hearts and diamonds) and the black suits (spades and clubs).
- Rank is used to indicate the major (spades and hearts) versus minor (diamonds and clubs) suits.
- Shape is used to denote the pointed (diamonds and spades, which visually have a sharp point uppermost) versus rounded (hearts and clubs) suits. This is used in bridge as a mnemonic.

=== Four-color suits ===
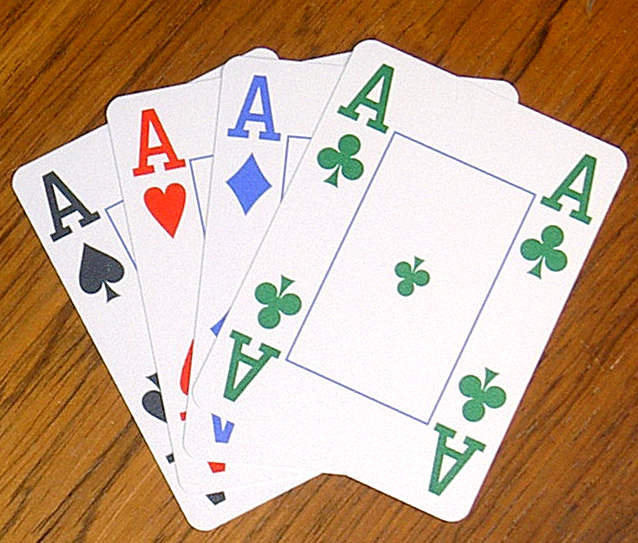
The aces of a four-color deck

Some decks, while using the French suits, give each suit a different color to make the suits more distinct from each other. In bridge, such decks are known as no-revoke decks, and the most common colors are black spades, red hearts, blue diamonds and green clubs, although in the past the diamond suit usually appeared in a golden yellow-orange. A pack occasionally used in Germany uses green spades (comparable to leaves), red hearts, yellow diamonds (comparable to bells) and black clubs (comparable to acorns). This is a compromise deck devised to allow players from East Germany (who used German suits) and West Germany (who adopted the French suits) to be comfortable with the same deck when playing tournament Skat after the German reunification.

The poker-inspired video game Balatro also has a high-contrast setting to make suits more distinguishable. With this setting, clubs are blue and diamonds are yellow.

== Other suited decks ==
=== Swiss-German experimental suit systems ===
This is a list of suit systems devised by Swiss-German cardmakers. Most of them consist of cardmakers early in the timeline of these playing cards:

15th–16th Century Swiss-German suit systems
Name	Time	Suit 1	Suit 2	Suit 3	Suit 4	Other Suits
Mentioned by Michael Dummett
Stuttgart pack	c. 1427–1431	Stags	Hounds	Ducks	Falcons	
Cards from Shields suit (presumed Swiss suit system)	c. 1433–1451	Acorns (presumed)	Shields	Roses (presumed)	Bells (presumed)	
Ambraser Hofjagdspiel	c. 1440–1445	Falcons	Lures	Hounds	Herons	
Liechtenstein pack	c. 1440–1450, c. 1494–1500 (disputed)	Batons (or polosticks)	Cups	Swords	Coins	Shields
Listed by Dominican Meister Ingold	1450	Pennies	Crowns	Roses	Rings	
Fragmentary sheet of Maihinger pack	c. 1450	Lions	Bears	Dogs		
Several incomplete packs from Basel	c. 1470 to 1529	Feathers	Shields	Hats	Bells	
Set of mutilated cards from Alsace	c. 1480	Acorns	Shields	Crowns	Bells	
2 fragmentary sheets from the Upper Rhine	16th century (1500s)	Beans	Birds	Carnations		
Pack by Thomas Murner for teaching logic	1509	Acorns	Shields	Hearts	Bells	Crowns, et al. (total 16 suits)
Pack by Thomas Murner for teaching law	1515	Acorns	Shields	Hearts	Bells	Crowns, et al. (total 12 suits)
Pack by Hans Sebald Beham	c. 1523	Acorns	Leaves	Roses	Pomegranates	
Incomplete sheet from Basel	c. 1531	Purses	Keys			
Pack by Hopfer of Nuremberg	c. 1536–1539	Batons (arranged as spokes of a wheel)	Cups	Swords (arranged as spokes of a wheel)	Coins	
Pack by Virgil Solis	c. 1540–1545	Lions	Apes	Parrots	Peacocks	
2 packs by Heinrich Hauk of Frankfurt	1585 and 1588	Acorns	Birds	Roses	Bells	
Pack perhaps by Heinrich Hauk		Lions	Apes	Parrots	Eagles	
Pack attributed to Hans Sebald Beham		Acorns	Bells	Roses	Parrots	
Other Suit systems
Pack by Master of the Playing Cards	c. 1455	Flowers	Wild men	Beasts of prey	Stags	Herons
Hofämterspiel	c. 1460	Shields (France)	Shields (Germany)	Shields (Bohemia)	Shields (Hungary)	
Flemish Hunting Deck	c. 1475–1480	Dog collars	Dog tethers	Gaming nooses	Hunting horns	
Pack by south German engraver	c. 1496	Batons	Cups	Swords	Pomegranates (Note: Possibly alludes to the kingdom of Granada.)	
Pack by Master P. W.	c. 1500	Hares	Parrots	Carnations	Columbines	Roses
Pack by Jost Amman	1588	Books	Cups	Ink pads	Pots	

=== Extended French suit systems ===
This is a list of suit systems devised by modern cardmakers.

20th–21st Century French suit systems
Name	Time	Suit 1	Suit 2	Suit 3	Suit 4	Other Suits
Five-Suit Bridge Playing Cards by Walter W. Marseille	1937	Hearts	Diamonds	Clubs	Spades	Leaves
Five-Suit Bridge Playing Cards by De La Rue	1938	Hearts	Diamonds	Clubs	Spades	Crowns (Royals)
Five-Suit Bridge Playing Cards by USPCC	1938	Hearts	Diamonds	Clubs	Spades	Eagles
Five-Suit Bridge Playing Cards by Parker Brothers	1938	Hearts	Diamonds	Clubs	Spades	Castles
Estate Playing Cards by Keith Wilson	2006	Hearts (The Church)	Diamonds (Corporations)	Clubs (The Community)	Spades (The Military)	Waves (The Media/Communication)

=== Suited-and-ranked decks ===
A large number of games are based around a deck in which each card has a rank and a suit (usually represented by a color), and for each suit there is exactly one card having each rank, though in many cases the deck has various special cards as well.

Color suits used by some modern card games
Games	Suits	red	orange brown	yellow gold	green	cyan teal	blue	purple	magenta pink	black grey white
DUO	4									
UNO, Phase 10	4									
UNO Flip	8									
4-Colour Suits	4									
4-Colour Suits (Old)	4									
Rook, 4-Colour Suits (German)	4									
Sticheln	5									
Mü	5									
Rage, Level 8	6									
Schotten Totten	6									

=== Other modern decks ===
Decks for some games are divided into suits, but otherwise bear little relation to traditional games. An example would be the board game Taj Mahal, in which each card has one of four background colors, the rule being that all the cards played by a single player in a single round must be the same color. The selection of cards in the deck of each color is approximately the same and the player's choice of which color to use is guided by the contents of their particular hand.

In the trick-taking card game Flaschenteufel ("The Bottle Imp"), all cards are part of a single sequence ranked from 1 to 37 but split into three suits depending on its rank. players must follow the suit led, but if they are void in that suit they may play a card of another suit and this can still win the trick if its rank is high enough. For this reason every card in the deck has a different number to prevent ties. A further strategic element is introduced since one suit contains mostly low-ranking cards and another, mostly high-ranking cards.

Whereas cards in a traditional deck have two classifications—suit and rank—and each combination is represented by one card, giving for example 4 suits × 13 ranks = 52 cards, each card in a Set deck has four classifications each into one of three categories, giving a total of 3 × 3 × 3 × 3 = 81 cards. Any one of these four classifications could be considered a suit, but this is not really enlightening in terms of the structure of the game.

==== Role-playing games ====
Several table-top role-playing games use cards in place of, or in addition to, the more traditional dice. In most cases, they are merely informational or replacements for a table roll, and thus lack suiting; others use them as a dice replacement without suit, most notably Everway, or to modify the task resolution, as in Masterbook or Torg. When used as the primary resolution method, the term "card driven" is used, borrowed from the boardgaming hobby's jargon.

Some card-driven games use traditional bridge/poker decks in French suits, including both jokers, such as Deadlands and Savage Worlds, and Castle Falkenstein. Castle Falkenstein uses cards only, and thus uses them for all mechanical randomness uses. Deadlands uses cards for initiative and the magic system. Savage Worlds uses the cards for initiative and for extended tasks, such as chases.

Certain games have used custom decks. The most notable are DragonLance Fifth Age and Marvel Super Heroes Adventure Game.

TSR Hobbies' DragonLance Fifth Age uses a 9-suited deck, numbered 1–9 in the suits of Shields, Arrows, Helms, Swords, Crescent Moons, Orbs, Hearts, and Crowns, each tied to one of the 8 attributes, and one suit, Dragons, numbered 1–10. Trump is set by the action's governing attribute, and playing trump grants adding a card drawn from the deck to the total. The cards also have several other elements on them, including initiative, a color (not tied to suit; white red, or black), and an image of a character from the novels.

Marvel Super Heroes Adventure Game, a stablemate to DragonLance: Fifth Age, uses five suits; four are attribute-based, Strength, Agility, Intellect and Willpower, with duplicated values (1×, 1×2, 2×3, 4×4, 4×5, 4×6, 4×7, 2×8, 2×9 each), each showing a different Marvel character, and having the same White, Red, and Black coding not linked to suit. The fifth suit, Doom, has a different distribution (1×1, 1×2, 2×3, 2×4, 2×5, 2×6, 2×8, 1×9, 1×10). Aside from differences of suit, the resolution is the same.

Both TSR's card-driven games use card draws not just for task resolution, but also Initiative determination, use as a yes/no (using the initiative indicators) or all/partial/none oracle (using the White, Red, Black indicator) for play with or without a gamemaster, and for character generation.

== Uses of playing card suit symbols ==
Card suit symbols occur in places outside card playing:

- The four suits were famously employed by the United States' 101st Airborne Division during World War II to distinguish its four constituent regiments:
  - Clubs (♣) identified the 327th Glider Infantry Regiment; currently worn by the 1st Brigade Combat Team.
  - Diamonds (♦) identified the 501st PIR. 1st Battalion, 501st Infantry Regiment is now part of the 4th Brigade (ABN), 25th Infantry Division in Alaska; the Diamond is currently used by the 101st Combat Aviation Brigade.
  - Hearts (♥) identified the 502nd PIR; currently worn by the 2nd Brigade Combat Team.
  - Spades (♠) identified the 506th PIR; currently worn by the 4th Brigade Combat Team.

== Character encodings ==
In computer and other digital media, suit symbols can be represented with character encoding, notably in the ISO and Unicode standards, or with Web standard (SGML's named entity syntax). Unicode is the most frequently used encoding standard, and suits are in Unicode's Miscellaneous Symbols Block (2600–26FF). Unicode uses the terms "black" and "white" to mean solid or outlined, with the actual colour left to the user. Thus, for example, U+2660 ♠ BLACK SPADE SUIT and U+2665 ♥ BLACK HEART SUIT can be displayed as ♠ and ♥, as ♠ and ♥ or even as ♠ and ♥.

Playing card characters in Unicode
Codepoint:	U+2660 (9824_{dec})	U+2665 (9829_{dec})	U+2666 (9830_{dec})	U+2663 (9827_{dec})
Symbol:	♠	♥	♦	♣
Name:	Black Spade Suit	Black Heart Suit	Black Diamond Suit	Black Club Suit
Entity:	&spades;	&hearts;	&diams;	&clubs;
Codepoint:	U+2664 (9828_{dec})	U+2661 (9825_{dec})	U+2662 (9826_{dec})	U+2667 (9831_{dec})
Symbol:	♤	♡	♢	♧
Name:	White Spade Suit	White Heart Suit	White Diamond Suit	White Club Suit
Codepoints are expressed by the Unicode code point "U+hexadecimal number" syntax, and in parentheses the equivalent decimal number. Symbols are expressed here as they are in the web browser's HTML renderization. Name is the formal name adopted in the standard specifications.

It is recommended to use stylistic fonts for regional variations of the French suits. Though fleurons (e.g. ✿/❀) can be used for the flower suit, and stars (e.g. ★/☆) can be used for a fifth suit such as for Five Crowns.

== Metaphorical uses ==
In some card games the card suits have a dominance order, for example: club (lowest) - diamond - heart - spade (highest). That led to in spades being used to mean more than expected, in abundance, very much.

Other expressions drawn from bridge and similar games include strong suit (any area of personal strength) and to follow suit (to imitate another's actions).

== See also ==
- Hearts (card game)
- Spades (card game)
- Stripped deck
- Five-suit bridge
- Russian playing cards
