= Standard 52-card deck =

Playing card deck used in English-speaking countries

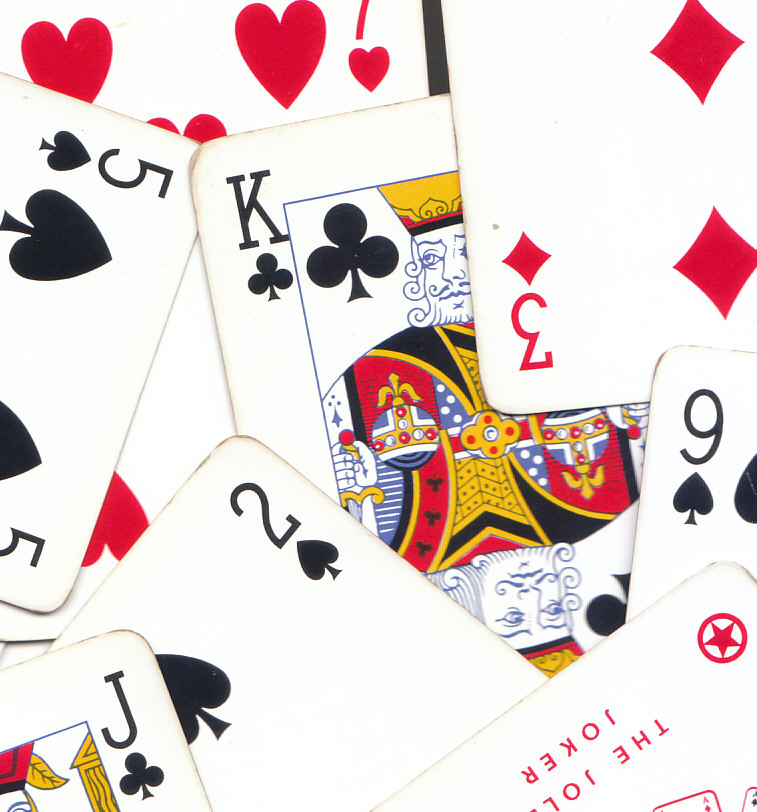
Cards from a standard, Anglo-Saxon or Anglo-American pattern, deck

The standard 52-card deck of French-suited playing cards is the most common pack of playing cards used today. A key feature of most playing card decks is their double-sided design: the backs of all cards are identical, helping to conceal each card's identity during play, while the faces are unique and display a suit and rank used in game mechanics. In English-speaking countries, the 52-card French-suited deck is the predominant traditional pack used for card games, although other types of playing card decks, such as tarot and specialty packs, are also available. Worldwide, the most common design for French-suited cards is the English pattern, while several other regional patterns, including the Belgian–Genoese pattern, are widely used in parts of Europe, North Africa, the Middle East, and the Balkans. In addition, many countries continue to use traditional decks with different suit systems, such as German-, Italian-, Spanish-, and Swiss-suited cards. Standard deck sizes also vary by region, with 36-, 40-, 48-, and 52-card packs commonly used depending on local playing card traditions.

Some decks also include one or more Jokers, although these are not part of the standard 52 cards and are used only in games that specifically require them. The number of cards used can also vary by game, as some formats remove certain ranks from the deck before play begins. For example, many traditional European card games use shortened decks containing 32 or 36 cards.

== Composition ==
A standard 52-card French-suited deck comprises 13 ranks in each of the four suits: clubs (♣), diamonds (♦), hearts (♥) and spades (♠). Each suit includes three court cards (face cards), King, Queen and Jack, with reversible (i.e. double headed) images. Each suit also includes ten numeral cards or pip cards, from one to ten. The card with one pip is known as an Ace. Each pip card displays the number of pips (symbols of the suit) corresponding to its number, as well as the appropriate numeral (except "A" for the Ace) in at least two corners.

In addition, commercial decks often include from one to six Jokers; most commonly two or three since the mid-20th century. The Jokers are often distinguishable from one another, either in design or color, as some card games require these extra cards. The Jokers can also be used as replacements for lost or damaged cards.

There are 52! or exactly 80,658,175,170,943,878,571,660,636,856,403,766,975,289,505,440,883,277,824,000,000,000,000 (approximately 8.0658×10^{67}) possible arrangements when shuffling a standard 52-card deck.

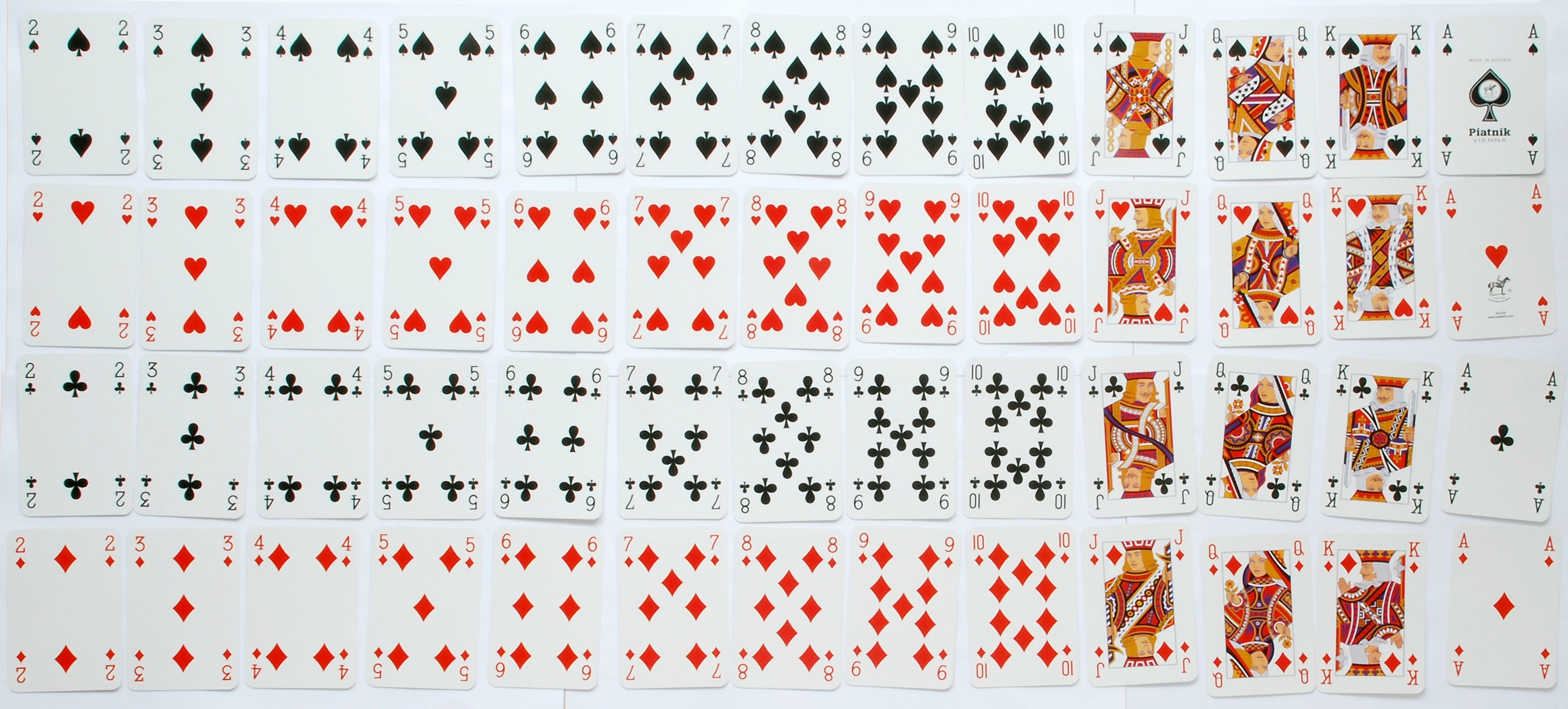
English pattern pack by Piatnik of Austria. The English pattern is also known as the Anglo-American or International pattern.

== New-deck order (NDO) ==
Major playing card manufacturers often deliver new standard decks of playing cards arranged in "New Deck Order" (NDO) or a very close variation of it. It starts with the two Jokers (if any), then ascending the Ace-to-King of Spades, Ace-to-King of Diamonds, then descending King-to-Ace of Clubs, and finally King-to-Ace of Hearts.

NDO has three benefits:

- Standardized ordering simplifies quality control
- Perception of untouched freshness and newness: Consumers, gamblers and collectors expect and appreciate a neutral, unshuffled starting point (Incidentally, casino decks are pre-shuffled, and finally punched or stamped to prevent re-use)
- This order is useful for many card tricks and effects, by ensuring memorability, facilitating sleight-of-hand and false shuffles, and the ascending-then-descending order allows for tricks that depend on palindromic or cyclic structures.

There are other popular orders, such as Mnemonica, also known as Tamariz because of its popularization by Spanish magician Juan Tamariz. David Blaine's Lion series frequently comes in the Mnemonica order.

== Design ==
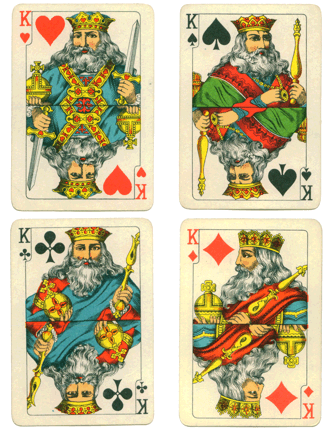
Dondorf Rhineland pattern

The most popular standard pattern of the French deck is the English pattern (Note: 'English pattern' is the name recommended by the IPCS.) (pictured above), sometimes referred to as the International pattern or Anglo-American pattern. The second most common is the Belgian-Genoese pattern, which was designed in France for export and spread to Spain, Italy, the Ottoman Empire, the Balkans and much of North Africa and the Middle East. There are also numerous others such as the Berlin pattern, Nordic pattern, Dondorf Rhineland pattern (pictured right) and the variants of the European pattern.

Modern playing cards carry index labels on opposite corners or in all four to facilitate identifying the cards when they overlap and so that they appear identical for players on opposite sides. For the Ace and court cards, this label is the initial letter or letters of the name of that card. In English-speaking countries they are lettered A, K, Q and J for Ace, King, Queen and Jack. In other countries the letters may vary, although the English versions are also sometimes used. Germany uses A, K, D and B (Ass, (Note: Formerly Aß or As.) König, Dame and Bube); Russia uses the Cyrillic letters Т, К, Д and В (Tuz, Korol, Dama and Valet); Sweden uses E, K, D and Kn (Ess, Kung, Dam and Knekt) and France uses 1, R, D, V (As, Roi, Dame, and Valet). Some older Finnish cards used to have numbers 1-13.

All early playing cards were single headed (also called single ended). During the 19th century, card manufacturers began designing double-headed cards so that the cards could be readily identified whichever way up they were. In the case of court cards, this entailed cutting off the lower half of the image and replacing it with an inverted copy of the top half usually, but not always, with a horizontal or sloping dividing line between the two halves. Today, while single headed patterns of German-suited and Latin-suited cards still exist, modern French-suited cards are invariably double-headed.

Although French-suited, 52-card packs are the most common playing cards used internationally, there are many countries or regions where the traditional pack size is only 36 (Russia, Bavaria) or 32 (north and central Germany, Austria) or where regional cards with smaller packs are preferred for many games. For example, 40- or 48-card Italian-suited packs are common in Italy; 40- and 48-card Spanish-suited packs on the Iberian peninsula; and 36-card German-suited packs are very common in Bavaria and Austria. In addition, tarot cards are required for games such as French Tarot (78 cards), which is widely played in France, and the Tarock family of games (42 or 54 cards) played in countries like Austria and Hungary.

== History ==
The English pattern pack originated in Britain, which was importing French playing cards from Rouen and Antwerp by 1480. The earliest cards of the English pattern date to around 1516. Britain only started manufacturing its own cards towards the end of the 16th century, when card production began in London. These were based on the Rouen pattern, but unlike the traditional French cards, they dropped the names on the court cards. The English pattern evolved, in the process losing "some of its Rouen flavour and elegance and became more and more stylised. The figures took more space in the cards and many details were distorted."

All early cards of this type were single headed, but around 1860, the double-headed cards, universally used on modern decks, appeared. Corner indices were added around 1880. During the 19th century, the English pattern spread all over the world and is now used almost everywhere, even in countries where traditional patterns and other suits are popular. In America, the English pattern was copied onto wider cards.

The fanciful design and manufacturer's logo commonly displayed on the ace of spades began under the reign of James I of England, who passed a law requiring an insignia on that card as proof of payment of a tax on local manufacture of cards.

Until August 4, 1960, decks of playing cards printed and sold in the United Kingdom were liable for taxable duty and the ace of spades carried an indication of the name of the printer and the fact that taxation had been paid on the cards. (Note: The Stamp Act 1765 imposed a tax on playing cards.) The packs were also sealed with a government duty wrapper.

== Card size ==
Card sizes by manufacturer
Manufacturer	Country	Marketed as	Length		Width	
Manufacturer	Country	Marketed as	in	mm	in	mm
De La Rue (c. 1870)	UK	not specified	3.7	94	2.5	64
Kem	US	Poker (Note: Kem Poker cards are close to the B8 (88 x 62 mm) size of ISO 216.) (wide)	3.5	89	2.5	64
Piatnik	Austria	Classic Poker, Poker Pro (wide)	3.5	88	2.5	63
Bicycle	US	Poker	3.5	88	2.5	63
Cartamundi	Belgium	Poker	3.5	88	2.5	63
Cartamundi	Belgium	Bridge	3.4	87	2.2	56
Handa	Denmark	not specified (wide) (Note: Taken from a pack with a tourist motif, so may have been aimed at American market.)	3.6	91	2.4	62
De La Rue (c. 1890)	UK	not specified (Pneumatic Series F (Thin))	3.5	90	2.4	62
Ravensburger	Germany	Poker	3.6	92	2.3	59
ASS Altenburger	Germany	Poker, Rummy	3.6	91	2.3	59
Piatnik	Austria	Bridge, Poker, Whist (narrow)	3.5	89	2.3	58
Waddingtons	UK	Bridge	3.5	88	2.3	58
Kem	US	Bridge (narrow)	3.5	89	2.25	57
Handa	Denmark	not specified (narrow)	3.4	87	2.2	56
Oberg	Sweden	Poker	3.4	87	2.2	56

Comparison of dimensions of common playing card sizes

Historically the size of playing cards was down to the printer, but during the 19th century sizes became standardised, initially to a size of 3½ × 2½ inches. Today these are often referred to as "wide" cards or "poker-sized" cards. Wider playing cards had advantages: it was harder to cheat and, if packs were unavailable, dog-eared cards could be trimmed smaller. Narrower cards, known as "whist-sized" or "bridge-sized" cards, probably first appeared in Europe and enabled players to handle the larger numbers of cards required for games like bridge.

However, there is no formal requirement for precise adherence and minor variations are produced by various manufacturers in different countries. In Germany, for example, standard Poker and Rummy packs by ASS Altenburger and Ravensburger measure 92 × 59 mm. Austria's Piatnik sells packs marketed for Bridge, Poker and Whist measuring 89 × 58 mm; while Britain's Waddingtons produce generic packs sized at 88 × 58 mm.

Other sizes are also available, such as a medium size (usually 67 × 42 mm or 2.6 × 1.7 in) and a miniature size (typically 45 × 32 mm or 1.8 × 1.3 in). These are often intended for playing patience or solitaire games. Larger "jumbo" cards are produced for card tricks and those with poor eyesight.

The thickness and weight of modern playing cards are subject to numerous variables related to their purpose of use and associated material design for durability, stiffness, texture and appearance.

== Markings ==
Some decks include additional design elements. Casino blackjack decks may include markings intended for a machine to check the ranks of cards, or shifts in rank location to allow a manual check via an inlaid mirror. Many casino decks and solitaire decks have four indices instead of just two. Some modern decks have bar code markings on the edge of the face to enable them to be sorted by machine (for playing duplicate bridge, especially simultaneous events where the same hands may be played at many different venues). Some decks have large indices for clarity. These are sometimes sold as "seniors" cards for older people with limited eyesight, but may also be used in games like stud poker, where being able to read cards from a distance is a benefit and hand sizes are small.

== Four-colour packs ==
The standard French-suited pack uses black for the spades and clubs, and red for the hearts and diamonds. However, some packs use four colours for the suits in order to make it easier to tell them apart. There are several schemes: a common one is the English Poker format with black spades (♠), red hearts (♥), blue diamonds (♦), and green clubs (♣). Another common system is based on the German suits and uses green spades (♠), yellow diamonds (♦), red hearts (♥), and black clubs (♣).

== Nomenclature ==
When giving the full written name of a specific card, the rank is given first followed by the suit, e.g., "Seven of clubs" or "Seven of Clubs". (Note: Sources vary as to the capitalization used with American sources tending to favor lower case and British sources tending towards capitals, but there are numerous exceptions and some sources combine them e.g "Seven of clubs".) Shorthand notation may reflect this by listing the rank first, "7♣︎"; this is common usage when discussing poker; but it is equally common in more general sources to find the suit listed first, as in "♠K" for a single card or "♠AKQ" for multiple cards. This is common practice when writing about bridge as it helps differentiate between the card(s) and the contract (e.g. "4♥", a contract of four hearts). Tens may be either abbreviated to T or written as 10.

== Terminology ==
Common collective and individual terms for playing cards that are relevant, but not exclusive to, the 52-card pack are:

- Face card or court card – a jack, queen or king.
- Honour card – a card that attracts a special bonus or payment for being held or captured in play. In bridge, honours are the aces, the court cards and tens (A, K, Q, J, 10); in whist and related games, the aces and courts (A, K, Q, J).
- Wild card – a card that may be designated by the owner to represent any other card.
- Numerals or pip cards – cards numbered from 2 to 10.
- "1" cards are almost always known as aces.
- "2" cards are also known as deuces.
- "3" cards are also known as treys.

== Nicknames ==
Certain cards have acquired nicknames over time. The following common nicknames for cards of the English pattern pack only. Other patterns are different and may have other nicknames in the countries where they are used:

- One-eyed Jacks – the jack of spades and the jack of hearts are depicted in profile, while the others are shown in full or oblique face.
- One-eyed Royals – are the king of diamonds as well as the one-eyed jacks. The rest of the courts are shown in full or oblique face.
- Suicide Kings – The king of hearts is typically shown with a sword behind his head, making him appear to be stabbing himself. Similarly, the one-eyed king of diamonds is typically shown with an axe behind his head with the blade facing toward him. These depictions, and their blood-red colour, inspired this nickname.
- The king of diamonds is traditionally armed with an axe, while the other three kings are armed with swords; thus, the king of diamonds is sometimes referred to as "the man with the axe". This is the basis of the trump "one-eyed jacks and the man with the axe". Poker may be played with wild cards, often "Aces, Jacks, and the King with the Axe".
- The ace of spades, unique in its large, ornate spade, is sometimes said to be the death card or the picture card, and in some games is used as a trump card. It has the nicknames Old Frizzle and Spadille.
- The queen of spades usually holds a sceptre and is sometimes known as "the bedpost queen", though more often she is called the "black lady". She is the only queen facing right.
- In many decks, the queen of clubs holds a flower. She is thus known as the "flower queen", though this design element is among the most variable; the Bicycle Poker deck depicts all queens with a flower styled according to their suit.

== Computer representations ==
=== SVG ===
Example set of 52 playing cards; 13 of each suit: clubs, diamonds, hearts, and spades
	Ace (1)	2	3	4	5	6	7	8	9	10	Jack (11)	Queen (12)	King (13)
Clubs	Ace of clubs	2 of clubs	3 of clubs	4 of clubs	5 of clubs	6 of clubs	7 of clubs	8 of clubs	9 of clubs	10 of clubs	Jack of clubs	Queen of clubs	King of clubs
Diamonds	Ace of diamonds	2 of diamonds	3 of diamonds	4 of diamonds	5 of diamonds	6 of diamonds	7 of diamonds	8 of diamonds	9 of diamonds	10 of diamonds	Jack of diamonds	Queen of diamonds	King of diamonds
Hearts	Ace of hearts	2 of hearts	3 of hearts	4 of hearts	5 of hearts	6 of hearts	7 of hearts	8 of hearts	9 of hearts	10 of hearts	Jack of hearts	Queen of hearts	King of hearts
Spades	Ace of spades	2 of spades	3 of spades	4 of spades	5 of spades	6 of spades	7 of spades	8 of spades	9 of spades	10 of spades	Jack of spades	Queen of spades	King of spades

=== Unicode ===
As of Unicode 7.0, playing cards are now represented. Note that the following chart ("Cards", Range: 1F0A0–1F0FF) includes cards from the Tarot Nouveau deck, as well as the standard 52-card deck.

Playing Cards^{[1]}^{[2]} Official Unicode Consortium code chart (PDF)
	0	1	2	3	4	5	6	7	8	9	A	B	C	D	E	F
U+1F0Ax	🂠	🂡	🂢	🂣	🂤	🂥	🂦	🂧	🂨	🂩	🂪	🂫	🂬	🂭	🂮	
U+1F0Bx		🂱	🂲	🂳	🂴	🂵	🂶	🂷	🂸	🂹	🂺	🂻	🂼	🂽	🂾	🂿
U+1F0Cx		🃁	🃂	🃃	🃄	🃅	🃆	🃇	🃈	🃉	🃊	🃋	🃌	🃍	🃎	🃏
U+1F0Dx		🃑	🃒	🃓	🃔	🃕	🃖	🃗	🃘	🃙	🃚	🃛	🃜	🃝	🃞	🃟
U+1F0Ex	🃠	🃡	🃢	🃣	🃤	🃥	🃦	🃧	🃨	🃩	🃪	🃫	🃬	🃭	🃮	🃯
U+1F0Fx	🃰	🃱	🃲	🃳	🃴	🃵										
Notes 1.As of Unicode version 18.0 2.Grey areas indicate non-assigned code points

== See also ==
- 500 decks coming with extra ranks
- Stripped decks come with fewer ranks.
- Tarot Nouveau, the most common French-suited tarot game deck

== Bibliography ==
- Arnold, Peter (1988). The Book of Card Games, 2nd edn. London: Barnes & Noble. ISBN 1-56619-950-6
- Parlett, David (2008), The Penguin Book of Card Games, London: Penguin, ISBN 978-0-141-03787-5
- Phillips, Hubert (1957), ed. Culbertson's Card Games Complete. Watford: Arco.
