= Four-color deck =

French playing card variation

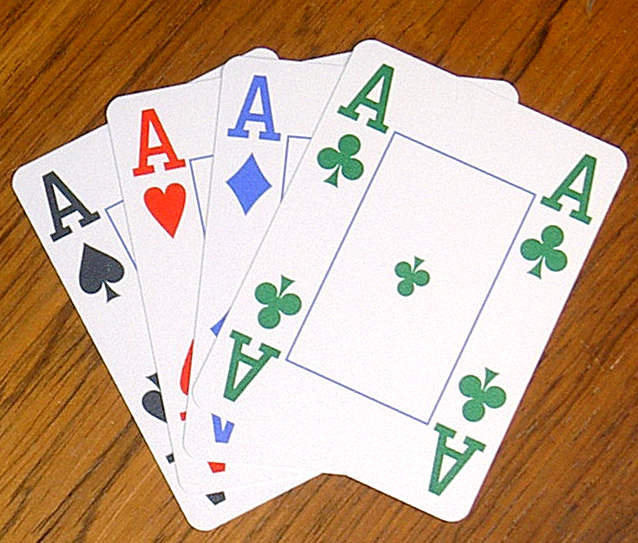
A four-color deck with a color scheme commonly seen in poker

Four-color deck variants
Set	♣	♦	♥	♠	Citation
English four-color Poker decks use black spades, green clubs, red hearts, and blue diamonds. (Caro, Multicolor, Avonmore, Copag, Modiano)	Green	Blue	Red	Black	
German four-color Skat decks use black clubs, green spades, red hearts, and yellow diamonds.	Black	Yellow	Red	Green	
English four-color Bridge decks use black spades, red hearts, orange diamonds, and purple clubs.	Purple	Orange	Red	Black	
(American Centennial, Mauger)	Blue	Yellow	Red	Black	
	Green	Orange	Red	Black	
Seminole Wars no-revoke Bridge deck with blue spades, red hearts, orange-yellow diamonds and green clubs. (Humphreys, Spectrum, Hesslers)	Green	Yellow	Red	Blue	
Bridge (Avoid)	Pink	Orange	Red	Black	
Summer Color (Bridge) deck	Pink	Yellow	Orange	Cyan	

A four-color deck (US) or four-colour pack (UK) is a deck of playing cards identical to the standard French deck except for the color of the suits. In a typical English four-color deck, hearts are red and spades are black as usual, but clubs are green and diamonds are blue. However, other color combinations have been used over the centuries, in other areas or for certain games.

== No-revoke decks ==
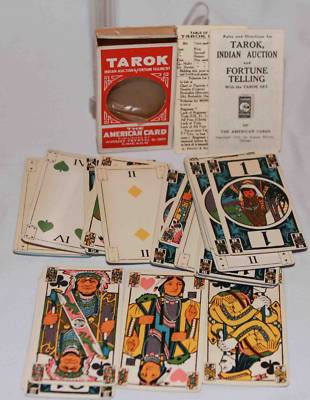
Tarock deck by Petrtyl & Son

Four-color decks made for trick-taking games such as bridge, whist, or jass are often called no-revoke decks because they are perceived to reduce the risk of a player accidentally revoking (illegally playing a card of a suit other than that led). Dozens of card manufacturers have developed four-colored suit cards for bridges during the 1900s and continue into this century.

The earliest such deck in the US is by J. Y. Humphreys who created the "Seminole Wars Deck" in 1819, which had four colored suits of blue spades, green clubs, red hearts and yellow diamonds.

In the German game of skat the official tournament standard since the 1990s is to use a no-revoke deck known as a Turnierbild deck. In these decks, spades are green and diamonds are yellow, the clubs and hearts being respectively black and red as normal, which also reflects the suit order: clubs, spades, hearts, diamonds. This is intended as a compromise for players (typically from former East Germany) who prefer German suits over French; the green spades translate to leaves and the yellow diamonds to bells in the German suits.

In 1922, August Petryl & Son produced a tarock deck with black clubs, yellow diamonds, pink hearts, and green spades in the United States. They were sold in two versions, a full 78-card deck and a 54-card deck. The smaller deck is structured the same as Industrie und Glück decks as it was designed to play a variant of Königrufen.

The basic principle of this is to forestall any confusion of suits, especially in trick playing games in which following of suit led properly is a necessity, by altering one black suit and one red suit in some manner. The usual method of accomplishing this means is by alteration of color. Historically, the usual changes have been with diamonds yellow or orange and clubs green, although in more recent times, an increasingly large number of such decks have been produced in which diamonds are blue. Over the years, numerous other color changes have been used.

While change of color is the most usual method, other methods have been used. Below are some examples:

In 1906, the Willis W. Russell Co. of Milltown, N.J. produced a line of decks entitled, "Russell's Regulars," "Regents" and "Recruits" in which the spades and hearts had shaded out centers, with the suit symbols merely outlined. This was advertised as the "Decks with the Long Distance Pips," designed for a declarer at a game of Bridge playing from a dummy. However, the indexes were not included in this modification. As these decks were also produced in Pinochle format, it is difficult to see the advantages as this deck was designed.

The Le Febure Co. produced a deck in 1926 entitled "Nufashion" aimed at resolving this issue. In this deck the diamonds and clubs had hollowed out centers that could be very clearly seen' in addition, the indexes were included in this modification.

This was followed by John Waddington of London in 1936, with a deck in which the centers were shaded out, with miniature squares within the outlines of the diamonds and clubs. Also in 1936, the Universal Playing Card Co. of Leeds, in its Crown Point Works, produced a similar deck in which it was the hearts and clubs that exhibited shaded out centers, with the symbols merely outlined.

Yet other methods have been used to the same ends. In 1926, the United States Playing Card Co. produced its New Index Self Sorting deck, in which the indexes were altered so that on the spades and hearts the positioning of the designations were reversed; i.e., the suit symbol on those suits appeared above the rank rather than in the normal position below. On older editions of these cards, the full designation appears on each card around the edges as well as in the corner indexes.

The Household Paper Products Co. in its Western Playing Card Co. line produced a deck in 1935 in which the corners where the indexes are situated on the diamonds and clubs were shaded diagonally around the corners across the indexes, with pink shading on the diamonds and gray shading on the clubs. This was advertised as "The Deck with the Danger Signals."

More recently, in 1973, Öbergs of Sweden produced a deck in which the entire backgrounds of the diamond and club suit cards were flesh colored. However, the backs of these cards were variously numbered as 1 to 4 so this must have been intended for a special game.

In 1933, Grimaud of France, in its Olympic Piquet deck (32 cards, 7 low) produced a deck in which the indexes were enclosed in oblong boxes appearing in reverse shading, with white designations on a black or red background, on the spades and diamonds.

The Turbo deck currently on sale carries this idea a step further by modifying the entire face of the card in this manner, on the clubs and diamonds.

Much of this latter information was obtained by copying information from the playing card collection of Albert W. Field.

== Poker ==
A four-color deck for poker using the black spades, red hearts, green clubs, and blue diamonds was developed and publicized by Mike Caro. It was introduced at his World Poker Finals at Foxwoods Resort Casino in 1992. His original design was not a success as the colors were a surprise to players. The World Poker Tour uses the same colors as Caro's deck to display the players' cards for increased visibility on small television screens.

Four-color decks have become a somewhat popular option in online poker software interfaces since often each player may use their preferred design of playing cards without affecting others' experience, and since visibility is not as good on a small screen as in face-to-face play, especially as many online players play multiple tables simultaneously, with shorter time limits in which to make decisions. Having each suit represented by a different color can make it easier for players to recognize a flush.
