= French-suited playing cards =

Card deck using suits of clubs, diamonds, hearts, and spades

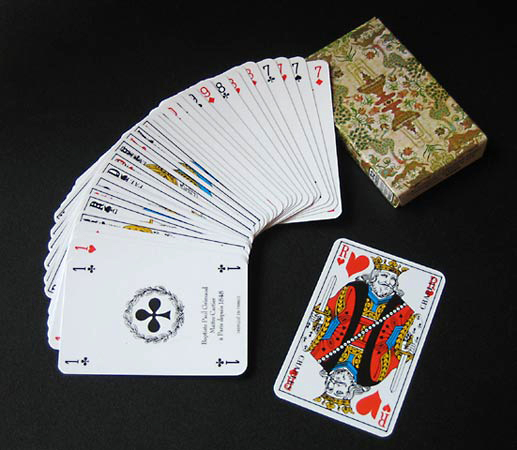
Standard 32-card deck of the Paris pattern

French-suited playing cards or French-suited cards are cards that use the French suits of trèfles (clovers or clubs ♣), carreaux (tiles or diamonds ♦), cœurs (hearts ♥), and piques (pikes or spades ♠). Each suit contains three or four court cards. In a standard 52-card deck these are the valet (knave or jack), the dame (lady or queen), and the roi (king). In addition, in Tarot packs, there is a cavalier (knight) ranking between the queen and the jack. Aside from these aspects, decks can include a wide variety of regional and national patterns, which often have different deck sizes. In comparison to Spanish, Italian, German, and Swiss playing cards, French cards are the most widespread due to the geopolitical, commercial, and cultural influence of France, the United Kingdom, and the United States in the 19th and 20th centuries. Other reasons for their popularity were the simplicity of the suit insignia, which simplifies mass production, and the popularity of whist and contract bridge. The Anglo-Saxon pattern of French-suited cards is so widespread that it is also known as the International or Anglo-American pattern.

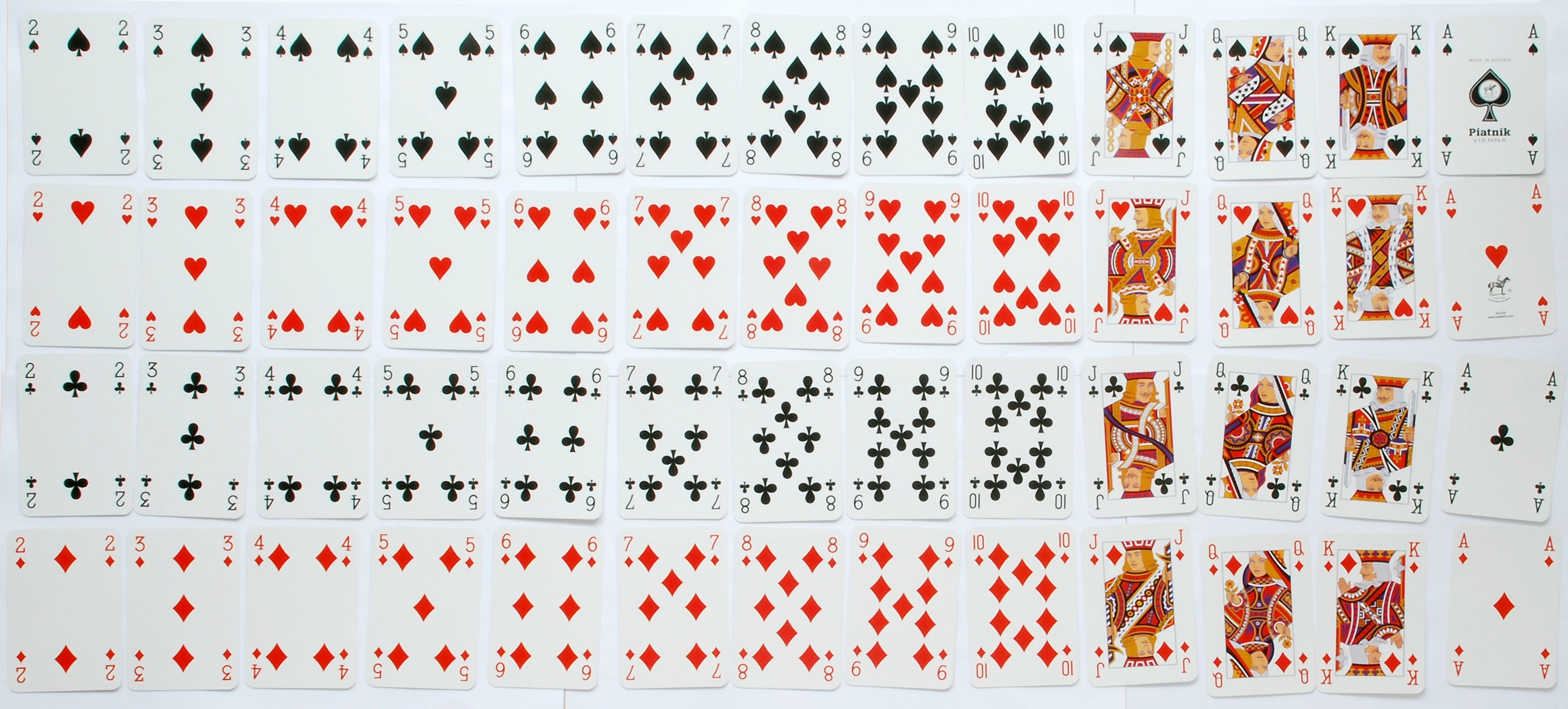
The standard Anglo-Saxon (Anglo-American or International) pack uses French suit symbols. Cards by Piatnik

== History ==
Playing cards arrived in Europe from Mamluk Egypt around 1370 and were already reported in France in 1377. The French suit insignia was derived from German suits around 1480. Between the transition from the suit of bells to tiles there was a suit of crescents.

One of the most distinguishing features of the French cards is the queen. Mamluk cards and their derivatives, the Latin-suited and German-suited cards, all have three male face cards. Queens began appearing in Italian tarot decks in the mid-15th century and some German decks replaced two kings with queens. While other decks abandoned the queen in non-tarot decks, the French kept them and dropped the knight as the middle face card. Face card design was heavily influenced by Spanish cards that used to circulate in France. One of the most obvious traits inherited from Spain are the standing kings; kings from Italian, Portuguese, or Germanic cards are seated. Spanish-suited cards are still used in France, mostly in Northern Catalonia, and Brittany and the Vendée with the latter two using the archaic Aluette cards.

In the 19th century, corner indices and rounded corners were added and cards became reversible, relieving players from having to flip face cards right-side up. The index for aces and face cards usually follow the local language but most decks of the Paris pattern use the numeral "1" for aces.

Suit	Hearts	Diamonds	Clubs	Spades
German (Germany)	Hearts (Note: German: Herz (heart), Rot (red), Hungarian: Piros (red), Czech: Srdce (heart), Červené (red)) (Herzen)	Bells (Note: German: Schellen (bells), Hungarian: Tök (pumpkin), Czech: Kule (balls)) (Glocken)	Acorns (Note: German: Eichel (acorn), Ecker (beechnut), Hungarian: Makk (acorn), Czech: Žaludy (acorns)) (Eicheln)	Leaves (Note: German: Laub (leaves), Grün (green), Gras (grass), Blatt (leaf) Hungarian: Zöld (green), Czech: Listy (leaves), Zelené (green)) (Blätter)
French (France)	Hearts (Cœurs)	Tiles (Carreaux)	Clover (Note: The shape of the clubs symbol is believed to be an adaptation of the German suit of acorns. Clubs are also known as clovers, flowers and crosses. The French name for the suit is trèfles meaning clovers, the Italian name for the suit is fiori meaning flowers and the German name for the suit is Kreuz meaning cross.) (Trèfles)	Pikes (Note: In German-speaking countries the spade was the symbol associated with the blade of a spade. The English term spade originally did not refer to the tool but was derived from the Spanish word espada meaning sword from the Spanish suit. Those symbols were later changed to resemble the digging tool instead to avoid confusion. In German and Dutch the suit is alternatively named Schippen and schoppen respectively, meaning shovels.) (Piques)
Spanish (Spain)	Cups (Copas)	Coins (Oros)	Batons (Bastos)	Swords (Espadas)

	Ace	King	Queen	Jack	Notes
(United Kingdom)	A	K	Q	J	
(France)	1	R	D	V	(Note: French roi (king), dame (dame, lady), valet (knave, servant); French name for ace is as; however, the French-made aces are traditionally labeled with the digit 1.)
(Germany)	A	K	D	B	(Note: German Ass (ace), König (king), Dame (dame, lady), Bube (boy) or Bauer (peasant, farmer))
(Poland)	A	K	D	W	(Note: Polish as (ace), król (king), dama (dame, lady), walet (valet))
(Denmark)	A or Es	K	D	B or Kn	(Note: Danish es (ace), konge (king), dame (woman, lady), bonde (peasant, farmer) or knægt (boy, married man, servant))
(Netherlands)	A	H	V	B	(Note: Dutch aas (ace), heer (lord, gentleman), vrouw (woman, wife, lady), boer (peasant, farmer))
(Iceland)	A	K	D	G	(Note: Icelandic ás (ace), kóngur (king), drottning (queen), gosi (knave))
(Sweden)	E	K	D	Kn	(Note: Swedish ess (ace), kung (king), dam (dame, lady), knekt (knave, servant))
(Latvia)	1	K	D	S	(Note: Latvian karalis (king), dāma (dame, lady), samdinys (mercenary) or kalps (servant); Latvian name for ace is dūzis (deuce))
(Russia)	Т	К	Д	В	(Note: Russian туз (ace or deuce), король (king), дама (dame, lady), валет (valet))
(Albania)	A	D	Ç	F	(Note: Albanian as (ace), derr (king), çup (girl), fant (soldier))

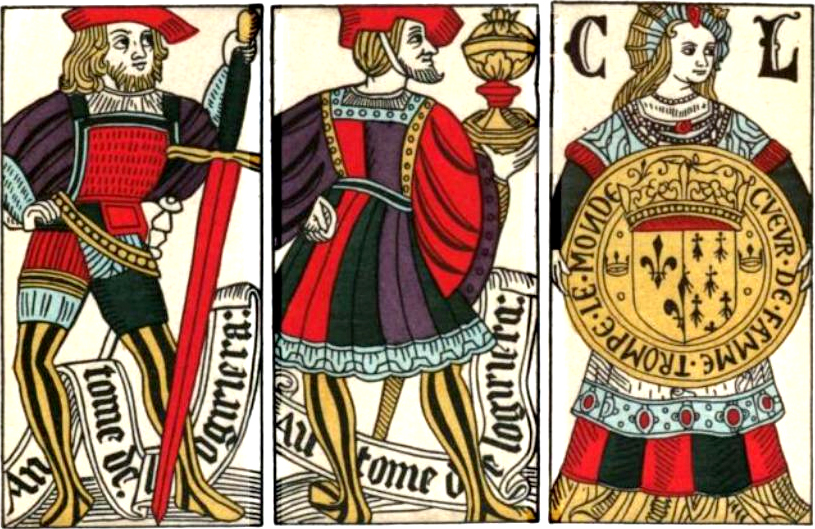
Deck celebrating the union of Brittany and France with Spanish suits but has queens instead of knights (Antoine de Logiriera of Toulouse, c. 1500) (Note: The penny here depicted has the arms of Anne of Brittany as queen of France with the legend Cueur de femme trompe le monde (Woman's heart deceives the world).)

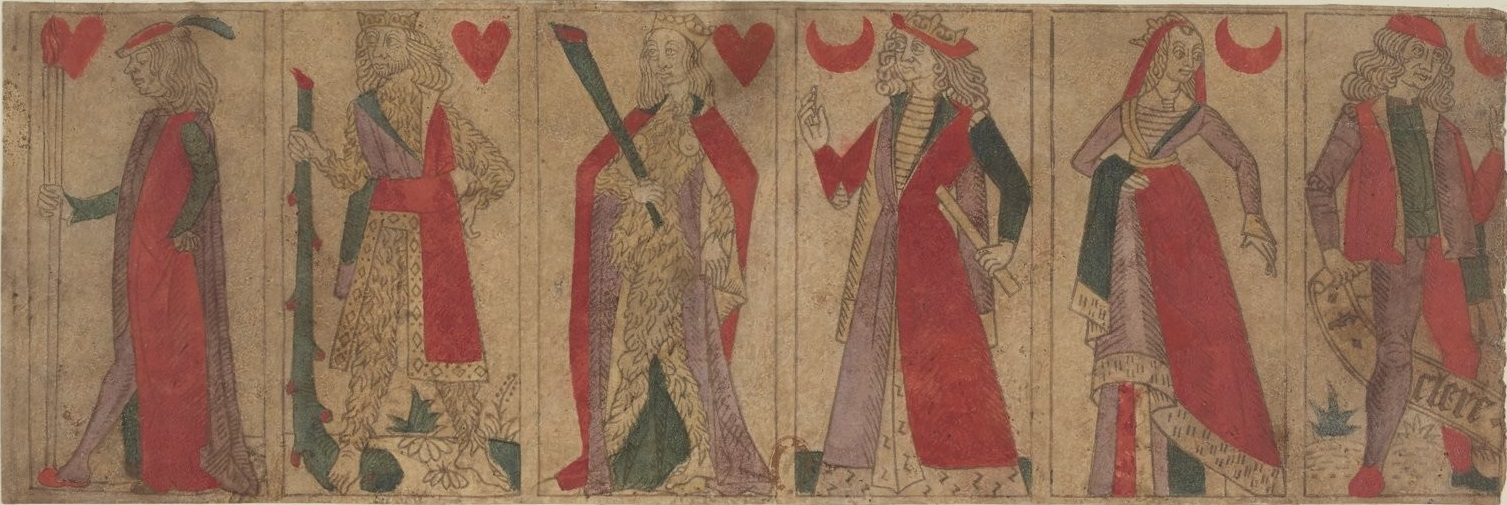
A transitional deck with suits of hearts and crescents (François Clerc of Lyon, late 15th century)

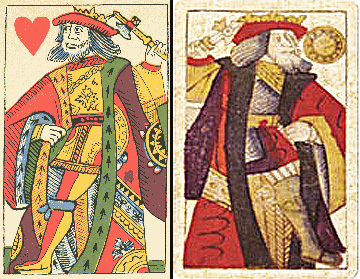
French Rouen pattern on the left, Spanish Toledo pattern on the right

== Current standard patterns ==
The French suited pack has spawned many regional variations known as standard patterns based on their artwork and deck size. The Paris pattern was heavily exported throughout continental Europe which is why most French-suited patterns share a similar appearance. The English pattern, based on the extinct Rouennais pattern, is the most well known pattern in the world. It is also called the International or Anglo-American pattern.

Patterns do not factor in Jokers, which came about in the early 20th century. Almost all 52-card packs produced in the present will contain at least two jokers, sometimes more. In Germany, packs produced for the game of Zwicker have six jokers.

=== Paris pattern ===
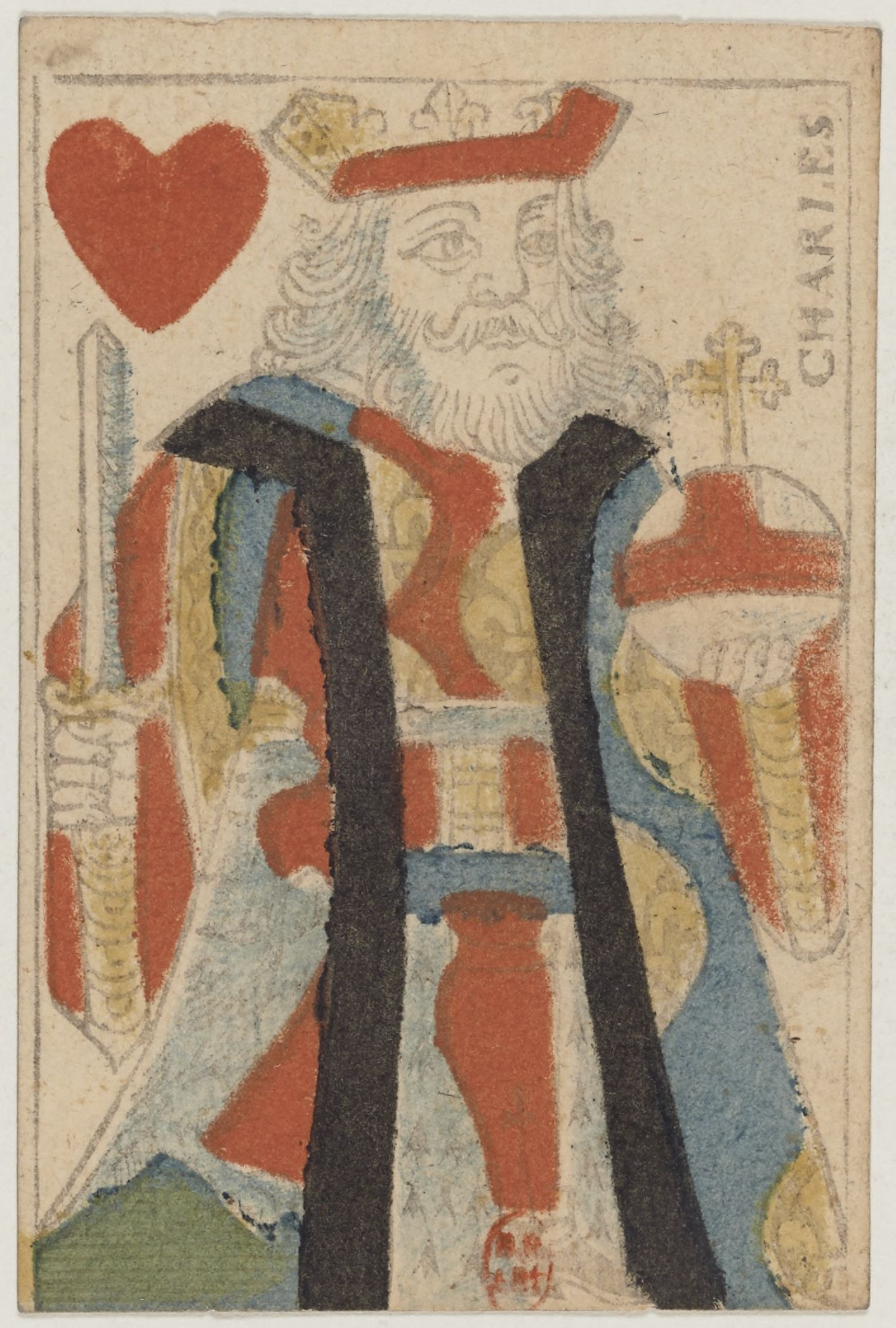
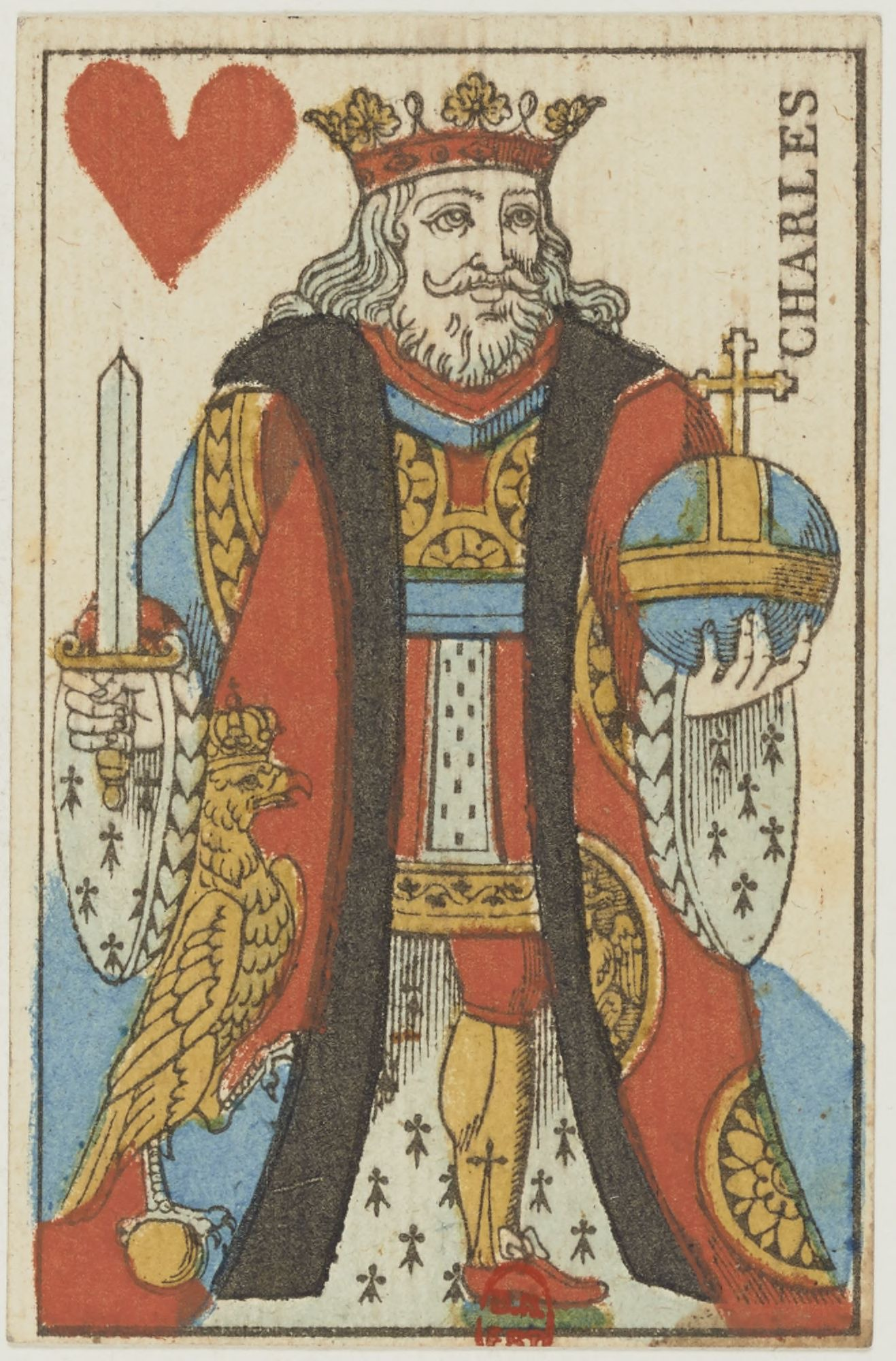
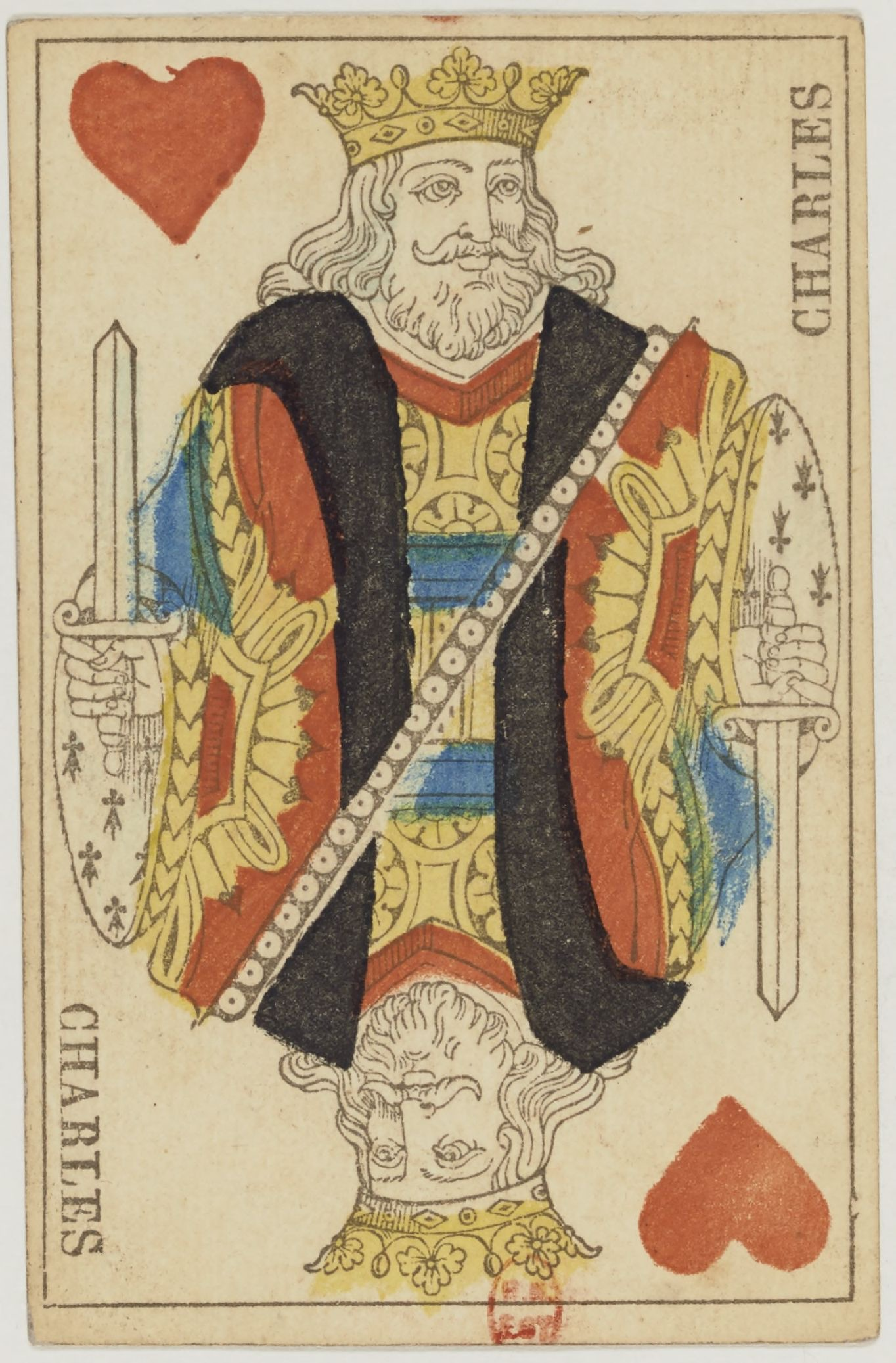
Charlemagne, King of Hearts in the portrait officiel

The Paris pattern came to dominate in France around 1780 and became known as the portrait officiel. From the 19th century to 1945, the appearance of the cards used for domestic consumption was regulated by the French government. All cards were produced on watermarked paper made by the state to show payment of the stamp tax. The most common deck sold in France is the 32-card deck with the 2 to 6 removed and 1s as the index for aces. 52-card packs are also popular. The French have a unique habit of associating their face cards with historical or mythical characters (Note: A feature also found in the Boiardo–Viti and Sola Busca tarots; see also nine worthies.) which survives only in the portrait officiel.

Suit Rank	Spades	Hearts	Diamonds	Clubs
King	David (Note: King Arthur is absent, but two of his knights of the round table feature as jacks.)	Charlemagne (Note: Possibly Charlemagne, or Charles VII, in which case Rachel (see below) would be the pseudonym of his mistress, Agnès Sorel.)	Julius Caesar (Note: Also found in the medieval Boiardo–Viti tarot.)	Alexander the Great (Note: The king of swords in the medieval Sola Busca tarot.)
Queen	Pallas Athena (Note: The queen of wands in the medieval Sola Busca tarot, also found in da Tortona's deck.)	Judith (Note: The queen of cups in the medieval Boiardo–Viti tarot.)	Rachel (Note: Either biblical or historical; see Charlemagne above.)	Argine (Note: Possibly an anagram of regina, which is Latin for queen, or perhaps Argia, wife of Polybus and mother of Argus.)
Jack	Hogier (Note: A knight of Charlemagne.)	Étienne de Vignolles (Note: Comrade-in-arms to Joan of Arc, and member of Charles VII's court.)	Hector of the Fens	Lancelot du Lac (Note: Since 1813; between 1613–1813, this card carried the manufacturer's name; before 1613, it depicted Judas (Maccabeus).)

==== Belgian-Genoese pattern ====
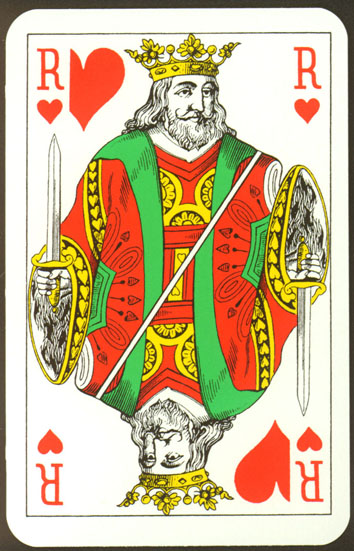
Belgian pattern

The Belgian-Genoese pattern is very similar to its Parisian parent and is basically an export version not subject to France's domestic stamp tax. Hence they lack the usual French court card names such as Alexander, Judith and Lancelot. Other differences from the portrait officiel are that: the jack of clubs has a triangular shield bearing the coat of arms of the former Spanish Netherlands (this is the main distinguishing feature); blue is usually replaced with green in the portraits and the diagonal dividing line lacks the beads. When the Ottoman Empire relaxed the ban against playing cards, Belgian type cards flooded their territory and are now found throughout the Balkans, North Africa, and the Middle East. They are also commonly found in France's former colonies. Within Belgium, the Francophone Walloons are the primary users of this pattern, while the Flemish prefer the Dutch pattern. This is the second most common pattern in the world after the English pattern. Belgian packs come in either 32 or 52 cards as they do in France. It was named the Belgian-Genoese pattern because of its popularity in both places and is the national pattern of Belgium.

Genoese type cards are identical to Belgian ones and often lack corner indices. They come in 36 (lacking 2s to 5s), 40 (lacking 8s to 10s) or 52-card packs.

==== Piedmontese pattern ====
The Piedmontese pattern is similar to the Genoese packs but its face cards have a horizontal instead of diagonal dividing line and the aces are found in a decorative garland. They also come in the same number of cards as Genoese ones. The Piedmontese pattern was once used in neighboring Savoy as both were previously united until France annexed the latter in 1860. A 78-card tarot version of the Piedmontese pattern, complete with knights, the fool, a suit of trumps depicting flowers, and corner indices, was printed in 1902 for Savoyard players. It was discontinued some time after 1910 but reproductions have been in print since 1984. The Chambéry rules that come with the deck are similar to Piedmontese tarot games but the ace ranked between the jack and the 10 like in Triomphe. Another playing card deck named after Piedmont is the Italian-suited Tarocco Piemontese, used in Tarot card games.

==== Bavarian derivatives ====
A Parisian variant appeared in Bavaria in the mid-18th century where the king of diamonds wore a turban. This originates from the German-suited Old Bavarian pattern. The king of spades, who represents David in the older decks, does not hold a harp. This group is closely associated with animal tarots.

===== Russian pattern =====
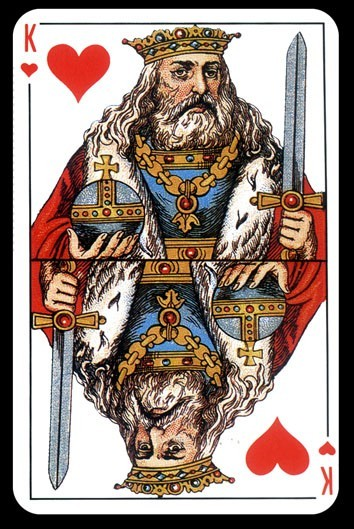
Russian pattern

The Russian pattern created during the early 19th-century is based on a Baltic version of a Bavarian derivative. The current appearance was finalized by Adolf Charlemagne. It usually contains 52 or 36 cards, the latter lacking ranks 2 to 5. The stripped deck is used to play Durak. They can be found in many countries that were once part of the Russian Empire or Soviet Union.

===== Adler Cego =====
Adler-Cego is the last remaining animal tarot and is used in Germany's Black Forest to play Cego. The courts are based on a Frankfurt version of a Bavarian derivative. It is sold with 54 cards; the 5 to 10 of the red suits and the 1 to 6 of the black suits are removed. Real and fictional animals are displayed on the trump suit. Trumps have a pink panel in each end with an Arabic numeral to show its rank.

===== Industrie und Glück =====
The Industrie und Glück ("Diligence and Fortune") tarock deck of Central Europe uses Roman numerals for the trumps. It is organized in the same manner as the Adler-Cego decks. Its trumps feature a newer pattern of more mundane scenes, such as depictions of rural life, than the traditional allegorical motifs found in Italian tarocchi decks. The turban wearing king is now in the suit of spades.

==== Hamburg pattern and derivatives ====
French-suited cards are popular in Central Europe and compete very well against local German-suited playing cards. Hamburg was once a major card-producing hub where makers began revising the Paris pattern to create the Hamburg pattern. Early examples were made by Suhr (1814–28) in Hamburg itself, while other manufacturers of the pattern were based elsewhere in the German Empire, in Austria, Belgium, France, Sweden and Switzerland. The Hamburg cards generated a family of similar patterns, all of which have the King of Spades holding David's harp, with the other hand holding a sceptre.

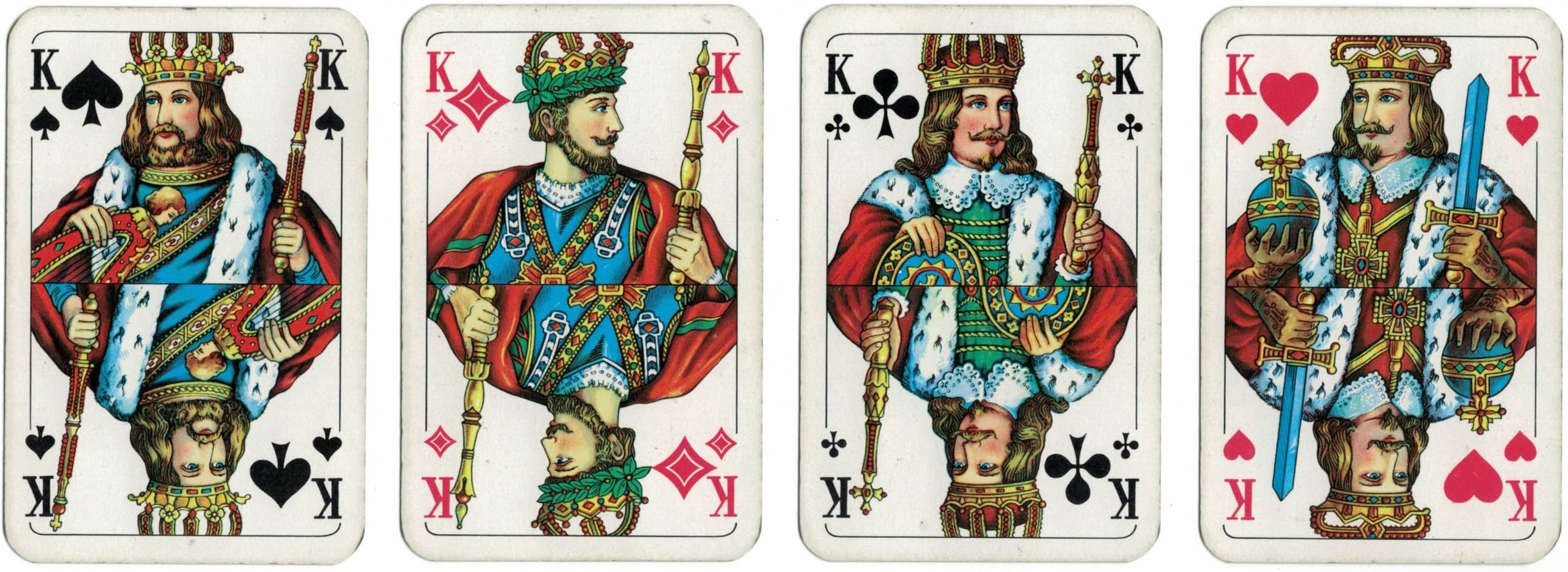
North German pattern: the Kings

The North-German pattern was created in Stralsund from a Hamburg derivative. It is familiarly known as the Berlin pattern, although this name arose from a misunderstanding about the origin of the cards which were formerly labelled as Berliner Spielkarten based on a finishing process used by that company. The crownless queens' hairstyles reflect the Biedermeier fashions of the day. They are usually in decks of 32 cards with the twos to sixes missing since skat, Germany's most popular card game, does not require a full deck. Decks of 36 cards (with the sixes) are for jass and tapp, a game played in Baden-Württemberg. Decks of 52 cards usually include three jokers but Zwickern decks have six jokers.

The French-Swiss pattern shares the same descent from the North-German pattern's Hamburg parent but their most distinguishing characteristic is that instead of having corner indices, white Arabic numerals are found within the pips closest to the corner. French-Swiss cards come only in decks of 36 with no ranks from two to five.

The Modern Portuguese pattern is a Parisian derivative from Germany. When it arrived in Portugal, the kings and jacks in hearts and diamonds swapped suits. The composition consists of 52 cards or until recently 40 cards. The latter had an unusual ranking (ace, king, jack, queen, eight, six–two). The jack ranking higher than the queen comes from the older Portuguese-suited games where a female knave was outranked by the knight. They also use French-language indices.

The Dutch pattern originates from Germany and shares the same parent as the Modern Portuguese pattern, but with different queens, and has been produced for the Netherlands by Belgian card makers since the 19th century. It has rarely been produced in the Netherlands itself. Its most distinguishing feature are scenic aces. Also found in Flanders, they come in decks of 32 (no twos to sixes) or 52 cards.

The Trente et Quarante pattern is named after the game it is associated with. Unlike other patterns, it is usually found only in casinos. Although of German origin, this pattern is now produced only in Italy. They consist of 52 cards and no indices.

==== Dondorf Rhineland pattern ====
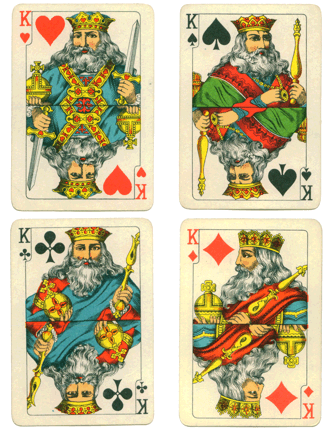
Dondorf Rhineland pattern

Around 1870, Dondorf of Frankfurt produced the Rhineland pattern. The kings have very thick beards. They have fallen out of popularity in Germany but are very common in Poland, Austria, the Netherlands, Denmark, and the Baltic states. They come in decks of 24 (no 2s to 8s), 32 (no 2s to 6s), or 52 cards, the latter of which may have up to three jokers in some countries.

==== Nordic pattern ====
In 1895, Dondorf produced a deck on behalf of Adolph Wulff of Denmark. The king of diamonds holds an orb while the other kings hold scepters. Many of the court designs were altered or swapped for the Swedish market. Presently, this pattern is printed only by Piatnik of Austria for export to Finland, which is why it is also known as the Finnish pattern. It is an amalgam of the original Dondorf and revised Swedish designs with the court indices numbered from 11 to 13. It comes in 52-card decks with three jokers.

==== Bourgeois Tarot ====
The Bourgeois Tarot was designed by C.L. Wüst of Frankfurt in the mid-19th century. It is popular in Francophone Europe and Quebec and is also used in Denmark to play tarot games that require the full 78-card deck. Like the Industrie und Glück, the trumps depict genre scenes but modern editions use Arabic numerals instead of Roman ones. A 54-card version with different trump designs is used in Baden to play Cego.

==== Modern Swedish pattern ====
Swedes used to use Bavarian-derived patterns. In the early 20th century, the firm Öberg & Son invented a new pattern unrelated to the old ones. This pattern has spread to neighboring Finland. The clothing for the figures in the court cards are color coordinated; green for spades, red for hearts, purple for clubs, and blue for diamonds. They are used in the standard 52-card format.

=== English pattern ===
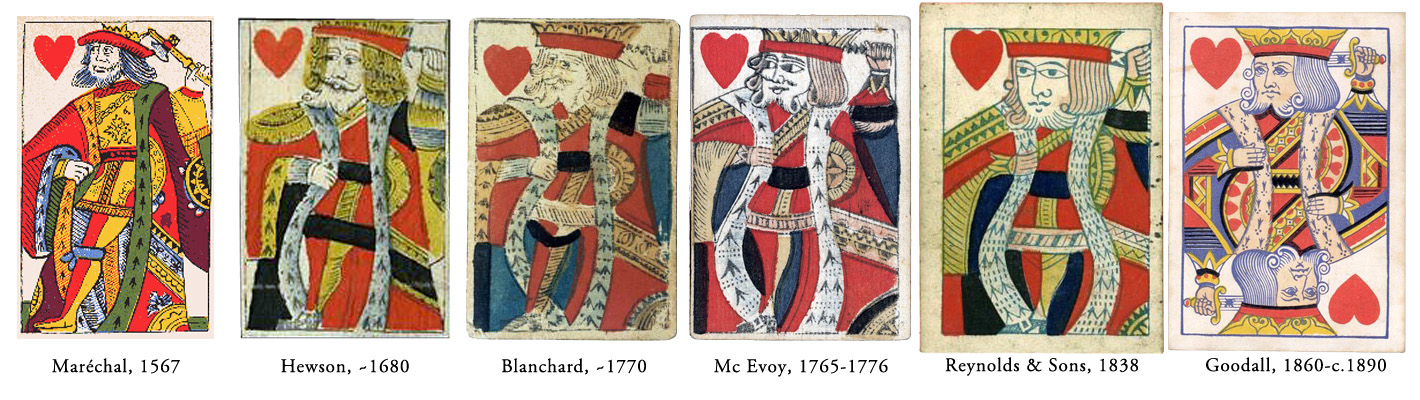
Evolution of the King of Hearts from the Rouennais to English pattern

Card makers from Rouen began exporting to England around 1480. According to David Parlett, Latin-suited cards must have already been circulating in England since there is evidence of playing cards there from at least the 1450s and French suits were invented sometime after 1470. This would then explain why the English renamed French suits to the Latin ones with which they were familiar. Hence the clovers were called clubs and pikes were named after the swords (spade). The English started producing their own cards a century later. In 1628, the importation of foreign playing cards was banned to protect local manufacturers. English cardmakers produced lower-quality cards than their continental counterparts, leading to the loss of detail from the Rouennais pattern. The English pattern is the result of Charles Goodall and Son's reworking of the old Rouen pattern during the 19th century. The majority of decks sold in this pattern is the 52-card deck. One deck invented in the United States but more commonly found in Australia and New Zealand contains 11s, 12s, and red 13s to play the six-handed version of the Euchre variant 500. In the late nineteenth century, they were also used for variants of draw poker and royal cassino. Decks marketed for Canasta often have card point values printed on the cards.

=== Vienna pattern ===
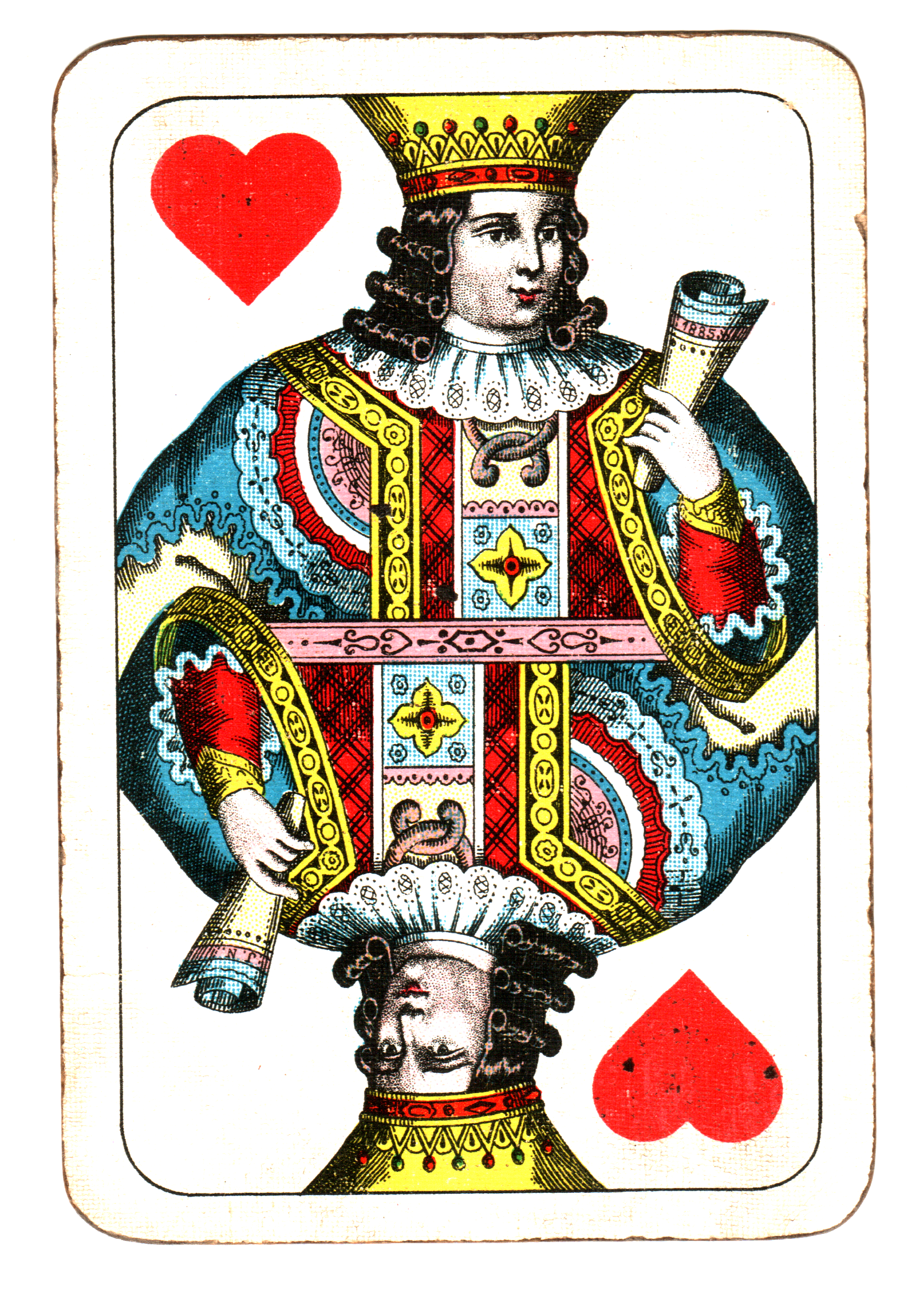
Vienna Type A (Large Crown)

Lyon was a major card exporter to German-speaking countries from the late 16th through the 18th centuries. While the Lyonnais pattern died out in most places, it survived in Austria and the Czech Republic and its modern incarnation is the Vienna pattern. Five types are recorded by the International Playing Card Society, all of them double-headed. Type A, also called the 'Large Crown' version of the pattern, emerged in the early 1800s and was based on the double-headed, Lyons export pattern, but with the crowns of the kings truncated by the frames of the cards, and no discernible dividing line. The court figures are highly ornamented. Today's version by Piatnik is based on an 1885 Type A design by Neumayer.

Type C was the earliest of three Vienna pattern types that were around at the turn of the 19th century. It originated in Sopron and Saxony and went on to become the standard pattern in Bohemia before giving way in the mid-19th century to Type D, also called the 'Small Crown' version of the Vienna pattern, since the crowns of the kings are visible in their entirety within the card frame.

Type E appeared in the 1860s and, again, the crowns are partially cut off by the frames of the cards. It appears to have died out in the 1960s.

Today the Vienna pattern in Austria comes in pack of 24 (lacking the 2s to 8s), 32 (lacking 2s to 6s), or 52 cards, the last with corner indices and three jokers.

=== Lombard pattern ===
The Lombard or Milanese pattern come in 40-card decks that is missing the 8s, 9s, and 10s and lack corner indices. The Lombard decks exported to Swiss Italian regions contain corner indices and also labels the ranks of the face cards. It is probably derived from the Lyonnais pattern and its offshoot, the extinct Provence pattern.

=== Tuscan pattern ===
The Tuscan or Florentine pattern, dating from the mid-19th century, is the only French-suited deck that is not reversible in the present. Cards measure 58 × 88 mm but the Toscane Grandi by Modiano are 67 × 101 mm large. It has the same composition of cards as the Lombard pattern. There was another pattern called "Tuscan" but it has ceased printing since the 1980s.

=== Baronesse pattern ===
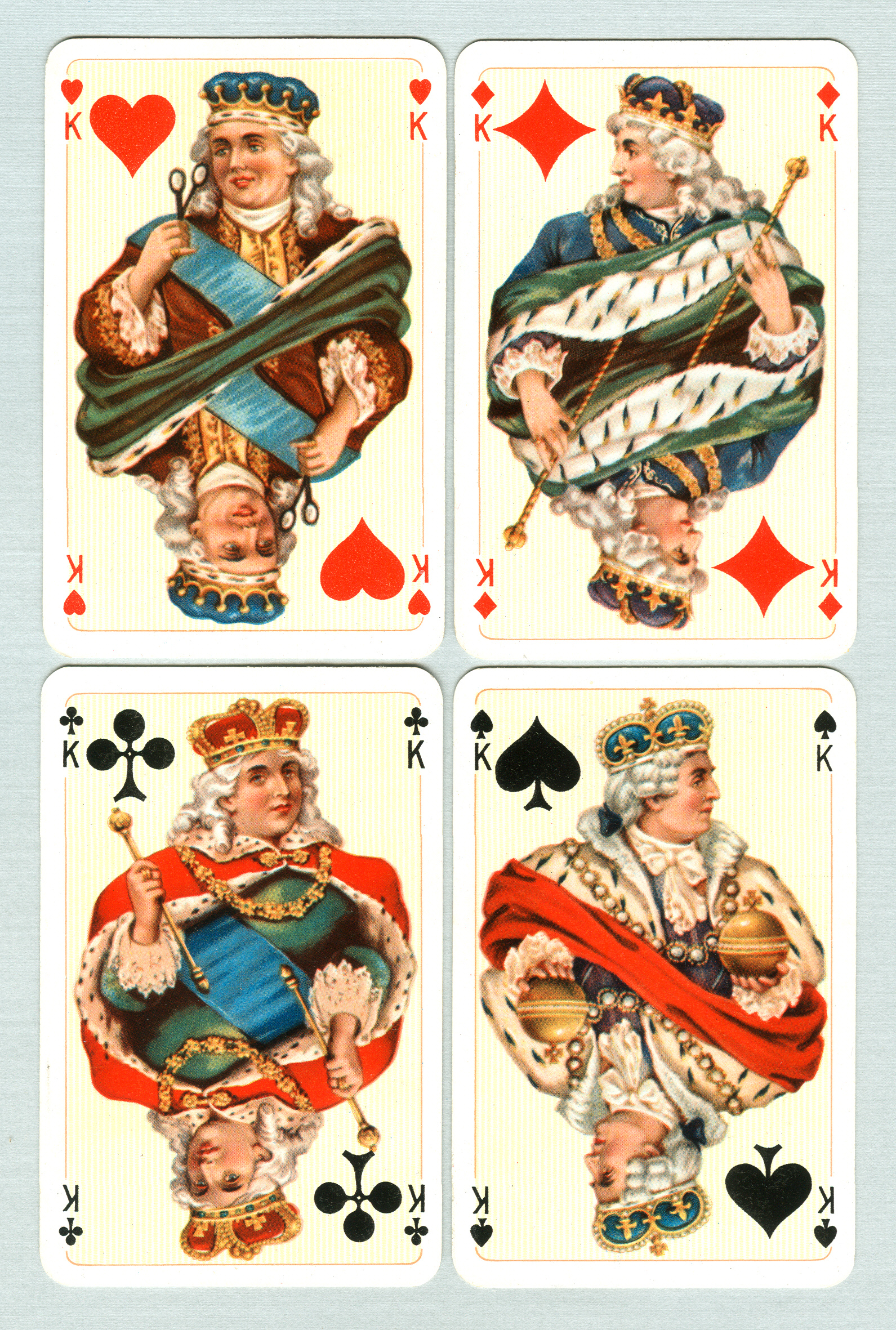
Baronesse pattern

Dondorf of Frankfurt produced this pattern around 1900 and, today, it is used in Patience decks by many companies worldwide. The court cards are dressed in rococo period costumes and wear powdered wigs. The Kings are crowned and carry state regalia or, in the case of the King of Hearts, a pair of spectacles. The Queens, also crowned, sport jewellery; the Queen of Spades coquettishly brandishes a folding fan and the Queen of Diamonds a peacock feather fan. The Jacks are young gentlemen with tricorn hats. The Jack of Hearts carries a sword and the Jack of Spades a cane. The backs usually have ornate, often floral, designs. They were made by ASS Altenburger (as "Baronesse"), by VEB Altenburger (as "Rokoko") and Coeur in the past. The earliest examples had no corner indices; they appeared from about 1906 onwards.

Since 1914, Piatnik have produced a derivative pattern for several of their patience packs that are referred to as Rococo playing cards.

== See also ==
- Standard 52-card deck
- Playing cards in Unicode

== Sources ==
- Mann, Sylvia (1990). All Cards on the Table. Leinfelden: Deutsches Spielkarten-Museum. ISBN 978-3-922561-98-9.
- Parlett, David (1991). A History of Card Games. Oxford: Oxford University Press. ISBN 0-19-282905-X.
