= Playing cards in Unicode =

Unicode for depicting playing cards' fonts and symbols

Unicode is a computing industry standard for the handling of fonts and symbols. Within it is a set of code points representing playing cards, and another depicting the French card suits.

== Card suits ==
The Miscellaneous Symbols block (U+2600–26FF) contains code points for eight suit characters:

U+2660	U+2665	U+2666	U+2663
♠	♥	♦	♣
Black Spade Suit	Black Heart Suit	Black Diamond Suit	Black Club Suit
&spades;	&hearts;	&diams;	&clubs;
U+2664	U+2661	U+2662	U+2667
♤	♡	♢	♧
White Spade Suit	White Heart Suit	White Diamond Suit	White Club Suit

Note: Unicode uses the terms "black" and "white" to mean solid or outlined, with the actual color left to the user. For example, U+2660 ♠ BLACK SPADE SUIT and U+2665 ♥ BLACK HEART SUIT can be displayed as ♠ and ♥, as ♠ and ♥ or even as ♠ and ♥.

It is recommended to use stylistic fonts for regional variations of the French suits.

== Playing cards deck ==
Unicode's Playing Cards block (U+1F0A0–1F0FF) has code points for the 52 cards of the standard French deck plus the Knight (Ace, 2–10, Jack, Knight, Queen, and King for each of the four suits), three jokers (red, black, and white), the back of a card, The Fool, and generic trump cards numbered 1–21. The depiction of these trump cards in most supporting fonts is based on the Bourgeois Tarot.

U+1F0A1	U+1F0B1	U+1F0C1	U+1F0D1
🂡	🂱	🃁	🃑
Ace of Spades	Ace of Hearts	Ace of Diamonds	Ace of Clubs
U+1F0A2	U+1F0B2	U+1F0C2	U+1F0D2
🂢	🂲	🃂	🃒
Two of Spades	Two of Hearts	Two of Diamonds	Two of Clubs
U+1F0A3	U+1F0B3	U+1F0C3	U+1F0D3
🂣	🂳	🃃	🃓
Three of Spades	Three of Hearts	Three of Diamonds	Three of Clubs
U+1F0A4	U+1F0B4	U+1F0C4	U+1F0D4
🂤	🂴	🃄	🃔
Four of Spades	Four of Hearts	Four of Diamonds	Four of Clubs
U+1F0A5	U+1F0B5	U+1F0C5	U+1F0D5
🂥	🂵	🃅	🃕
Five of Spades	Five of Hearts	Five of Diamonds	Five of Clubs
U+1F0A6	U+1F0B6	U+1F0C6	U+1F0D6
🂦	🂶	🃆	🃖
Six of Spades	Six of Hearts	Six of Diamonds	Six of Clubs
U+1F0A7	U+1F0B7	U+1F0C7	U+1F0D7
🂧	🂷	🃇	🃗
Seven of Spades	Seven of Hearts	Seven of Diamonds	Seven of Clubs
U+1F0A8	U+1F0B8	U+1F0C8	U+1F0D8
🂨	🂸	🃈	🃘
Eight of Spades	Eight of Hearts	Eight of Diamonds	Eight of Clubs
U+1F0A9	U+1F0B9	U+1F0C9	U+1F0D9
🂩	🂹	🃉	🃙
Nine of Spades	Nine of Hearts	Nine of Diamonds	Nine of Clubs
U+1F0AA	U+1F0BA	U+1F0CA	U+1F0DA
🂪	🂺	🃊	🃚
Ten of Spades	Ten of Hearts	Ten of Diamonds	Ten of Clubs
U+1F0AB	U+1F0BB	U+1F0CB	U+1F0DB
🂫	🂻	🃋	🃛
Jack of Spades	Jack of Hearts	Jack of Diamonds	Jack of Clubs
U+1F0AC	U+1F0BC	U+1F0CC	U+1F0DC
🂬	🂼	🃌	🃜
Knight of Spades	Knight of Hearts	Knight of Diamonds	Knight of Clubs
U+1F0AD	U+1F0BD	U+1F0CD	U+1F0DD
🂭	🂽	🃍	🃝
Queen of Spades	Queen of Hearts	Queen of Diamonds	Queen of Clubs
U+1F0AE	U+1F0BE	U+1F0CE	U+1F0DE
🂮	🂾	🃎	🃞
King of Spades	King of Hearts	King of Diamonds	King of Clubs

U+1F0A0	U+1F0BF	U+1F0CF	U+1F0DF
🂠	🂿	🃏︎	🃟
Playing Card Back	Red Joker	Black Joker	White Joker

U+1F0E0	U+1F0E1	U+1F0E2	U+1F0E3
🃠	🃡	🃢	🃣
Fool	Trump-1 (individual)	Trump-2 (childhood)	Trump-3 (youth)
U+1F0E4	U+1F0E5	U+1F0E6	U+1F0E7
🃤	🃥	🃦	🃧
Trump-4 (maturity)	Trump-5 (old age)	Trump-6 (morning)	Trump-7 (afternoon)
U+1F0E8	U+1F0E9	U+1F0EA	U+1F0EB
🃨	🃩	🃪	🃫
Trump-8 (evening)	Trump-9 (night)	Trump-10 (earth and air)	Trump-11 (water and fire)
U+1F0EC	U+1F0ED	U+1F0EE	U+1F0EF
🃬	🃭	🃮	🃯
Trump-12 (dance)	Trump-13 (shopping)	Trump-14 (open air)	Trump-15 (visual arts)
U+1F0F0	U+1F0F1	U+1F0F2	U+1F0F3
🃰	🃱	🃲	🃳
Trump-16 (spring)	Trump-17 (summer)	Trump-18 (autumn)	Trump-19 (winter)
U+1F0F4	U+1F0F5		
🃴	🃵		
Trump-20 (the game)	Trump-21 (collective)		

== Tarot ==
Four Knights of the Tarot deck were included when the Playing Cards Unicode block was added in Unicode 6.0 (U+1F0A0–1F0FF). In Unicode 7.0, a red joker, a fool, and twenty-one generic trump cards were added to the Playing Cards block, with the reference description being not the Italian-suited Tarot de Marseille or its derivatives (which are often used in cartomancy) but the French Tarot Nouveau used to play Jeu de tarot, which is used for divination less frequently.

== Emoji ==
There is an emoji for Japanese hanafuda (flower playing cards): U+1F3B4 🎴 FLOWER PLAYING CARDS. The emoji can stand for any hanafuda card but it is usually depicted as the Moon card specifically.

There are standardized variants defined to specify emoji-style (U+FE0F VS16) or text presentation (U+FE0E VS15) for various playing card characters:

Emoji variation sequences
U+	2660	2665	2666	2663	1F0CF
default presentation	text	text	text	text	emoji
base code point	♠	♥	♦	♣	🃏
base+VS15 (text)	♠︎	♥︎	♦︎	♣︎	🃏︎
base+VS16 (emoji)	♠️	♥️	♦️	♣️	🃏️

== Playing Cards block chart ==
Playing Cards^{[1]}^{[2]} Official Unicode Consortium code chart (PDF)
	0	1	2	3	4	5	6	7	8	9	A	B	C	D	E	F
U+1F0Ax	🂠	🂡	🂢	🂣	🂤	🂥	🂦	🂧	🂨	🂩	🂪	🂫	🂬	🂭	🂮	
U+1F0Bx		🂱	🂲	🂳	🂴	🂵	🂶	🂷	🂸	🂹	🂺	🂻	🂼	🂽	🂾	🂿
U+1F0Cx		🃁	🃂	🃃	🃄	🃅	🃆	🃇	🃈	🃉	🃊	🃋	🃌	🃍	🃎	🃏
U+1F0Dx		🃑	🃒	🃓	🃔	🃕	🃖	🃗	🃘	🃙	🃚	🃛	🃜	🃝	🃞	🃟
U+1F0Ex	🃠	🃡	🃢	🃣	🃤	🃥	🃦	🃧	🃨	🃩	🃪	🃫	🃬	🃭	🃮	🃯
U+1F0Fx	🃰	🃱	🃲	🃳	🃴	🃵										
Notes 1.As of Unicode version 17.0 2.Grey areas indicate non-assigned code points
