= J.O. Öberg & Son =

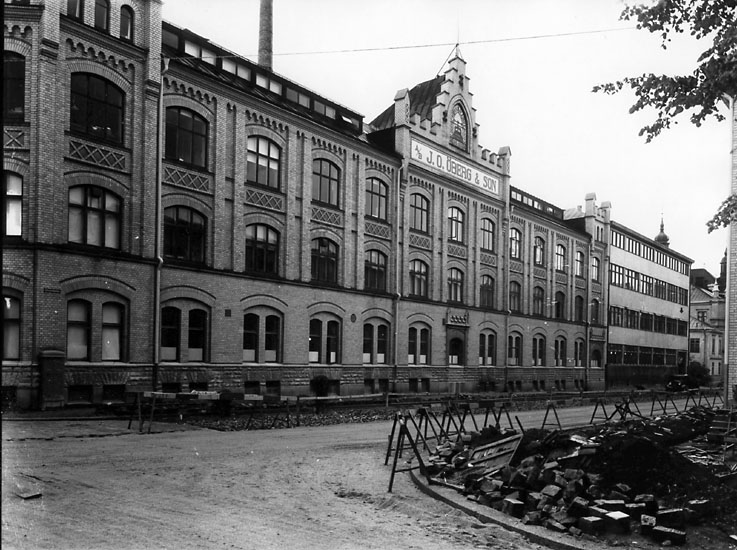
Öberg's factory in Eskilstuna (before 1944)

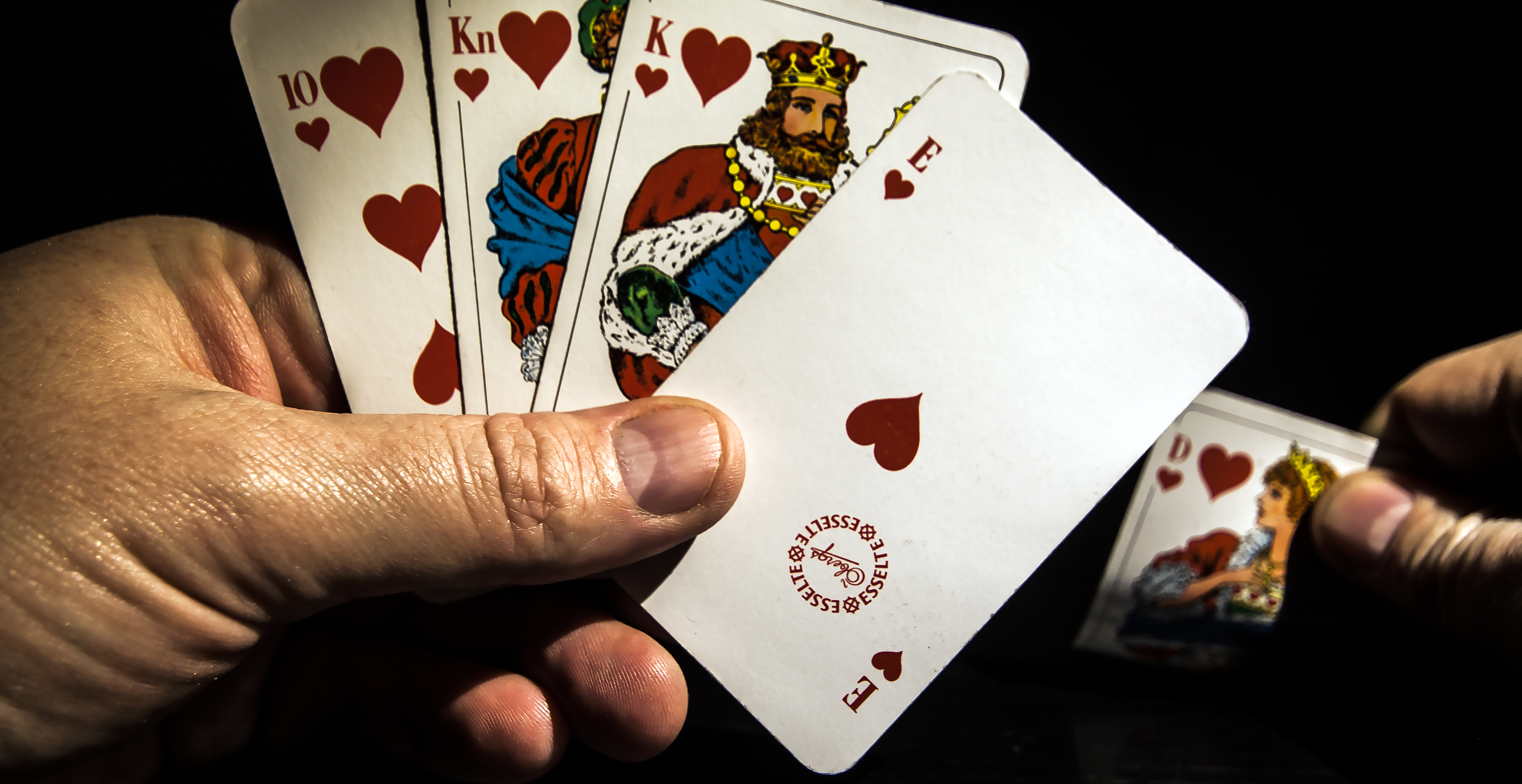
Hand of Öberg cards

J.O. Öberg & Son (Swedish: Aktiebolaget J.O. Öberg & son) was a Swedish company founded in 1845 in Eskilstuna.

Joseph Oscar Öberg established a small letterpress in Eskilstuna in 1845 but moved to Stockholm in the late 1840s with his family. In 1854, he visited the United States to study the printing business there. On returning to Sweden, he returned to Eskilstuna. In 1875, his son, Albert Öberg, took over the firm and its name was changed to J. O. Öberg & Son. At the same time they began to manufacture office books.

In 1901, a new factory was built at Gymnastikgatan in Eskilstuna. In connection with this, in 1902 it began the manufacture of playing cards and soon became the market leader in Sweden. In 1904, the company became a limited company and in 1913 they were acquired by Sveriges Litografiska Tryckerier. However, production continued in Eskilstuna under the old name.

The playing cards were designed in 1902 by one of Öberg's employees lithographers, Cryssander, based on a German model. In 1905, the cards were changed slightly to give a uniform colour scheme on the court cards in each suit. An updated version of the cards was created in 1933 by the German artist Elisabet Linge, while retaining the character of the cards. Until 1960, the Ace of Hearts in each pack was stamped as proof that Swedish goods tax was paid. After that, the stamp disappeared, but Öberg continued to label his Ace of Hearts, albeit no longer with a separate stamp.

The company manufactured office books, card systems, files, portfolios and playing cards.

In 1968 Öberg's head office was moved to Stockholm. In 1969 it changed its name to Esselte Öberg, and in 1979 to Esselte Dymo. In 1992, Esselte stopped printing the cards themselves, and outsource production to Skandinaviskt Säkerhetstryck. At the turn of the year 1999, production was moved to Belgium.

== Bibliography ==
- Ivar Schnell, Vägvisare genom Södermanland. En studiehandbok i hembygdskunskap. Sörmlands museum. Nyköping 1981
- Svensk uppslagsbok, 30. Malmö 1937
