= Knight (playing card) =

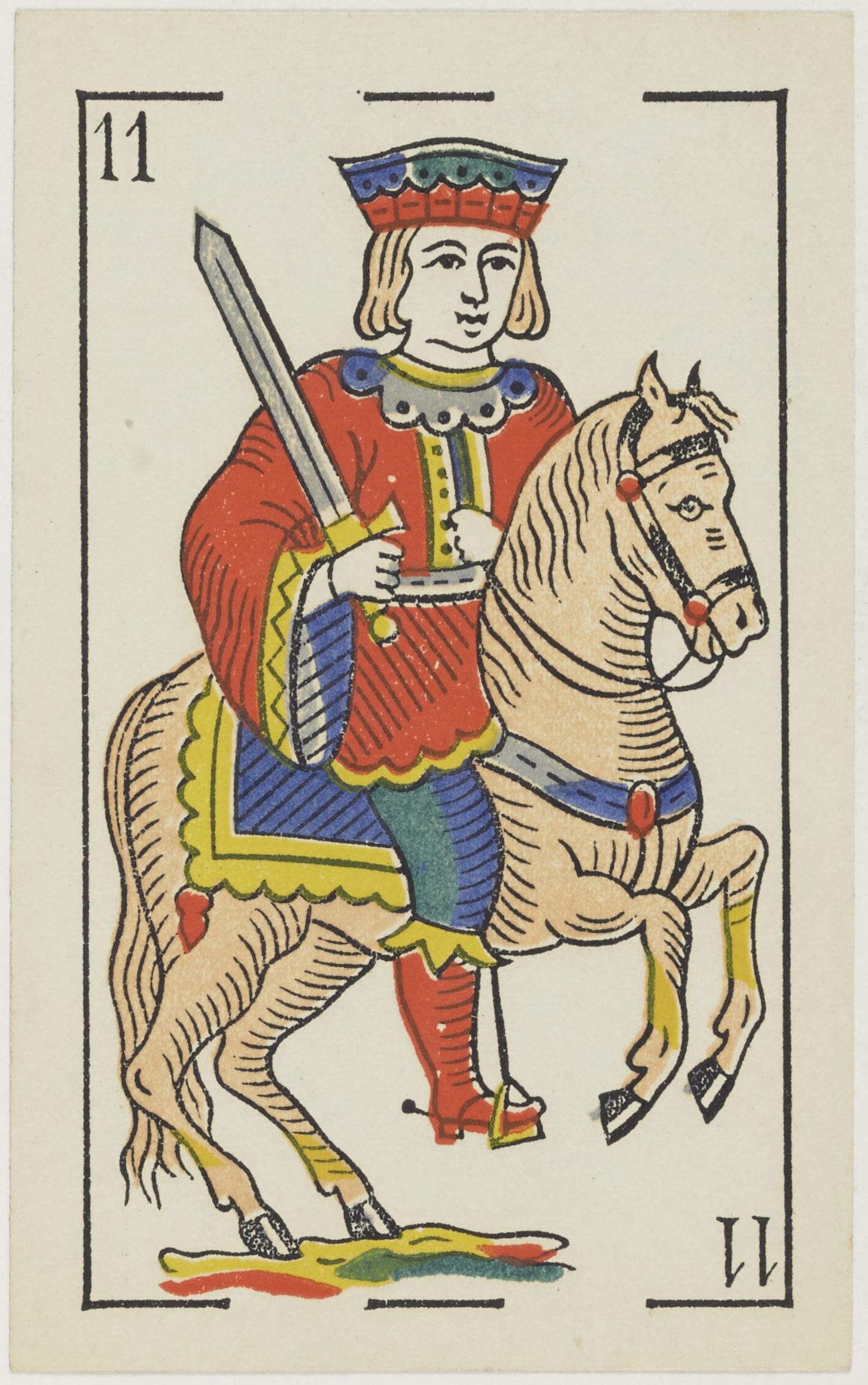
Knight of Swords from an Aluette deck

A knight or cavalier is a playing card with a picture of a man riding a horse on it. It is a standard face or court card in Italian and Spanish packs where it is usually referred to as the 'knight' in English, the caballo in Spanish or the cavallo in Italian. It ranks between the knave and the king within its suit; therefore, it replaces the queen, nonexistent in these packs.

The card also features in tarot and tarock packs. In French-suited tarot packs it is usually called the 'cavalier' in English, the chevalier in French or the Cavall or Reiter in German. and ranks between the jack and the queen.

Knights do not appear in German or Swiss playing cards; their place being occupied by an upper knave card called the Ober. One exception is the Württemberg pattern where the Obers are seen riding on horses. This depiction was inspired by Cego tarot decks during the 19th century.

== History ==
In the original Mamluk Egyptian deck, there were three court cards called the malik (king), the nā'ib malik (viceroy or deputy king), and the thānī nā'ib (second or under-deputy). The latter two were transformed into the knight and the knave when playing cards entered southern Europe. The knave is often depicted as a foot soldier or squire to the knight.

Many early tarot decks had added female ranks into the face cards including the Cary-Yale deck which added queens, mounted ladies, and maids as counterparts to the males. While mounted ladies and maids faded away or survive in minor regional patterns like the Tarocco Siciliano, knights were dropped in favour of queens in non-tarot French decks. In the Spanish suited Aluette pattern found in Brittany and the Vendée, knights have an androgynous appearance.

== Example cards ==
Latin-suited knights
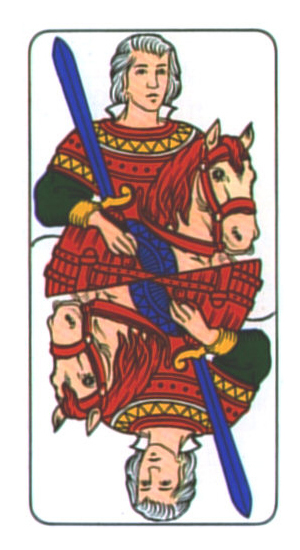
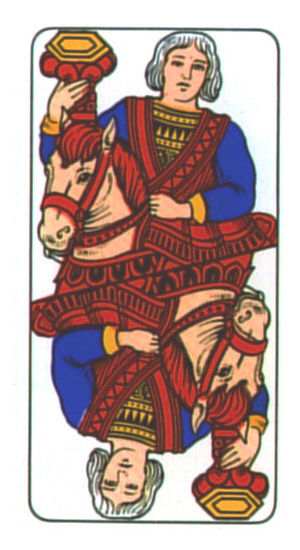
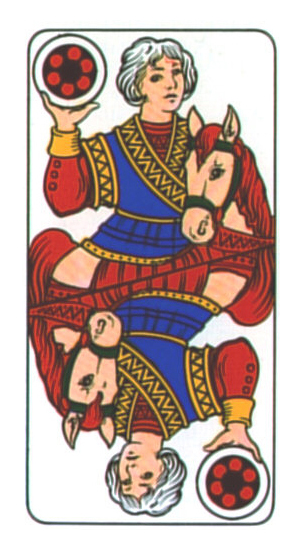
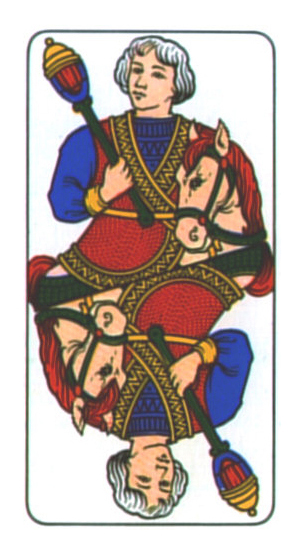
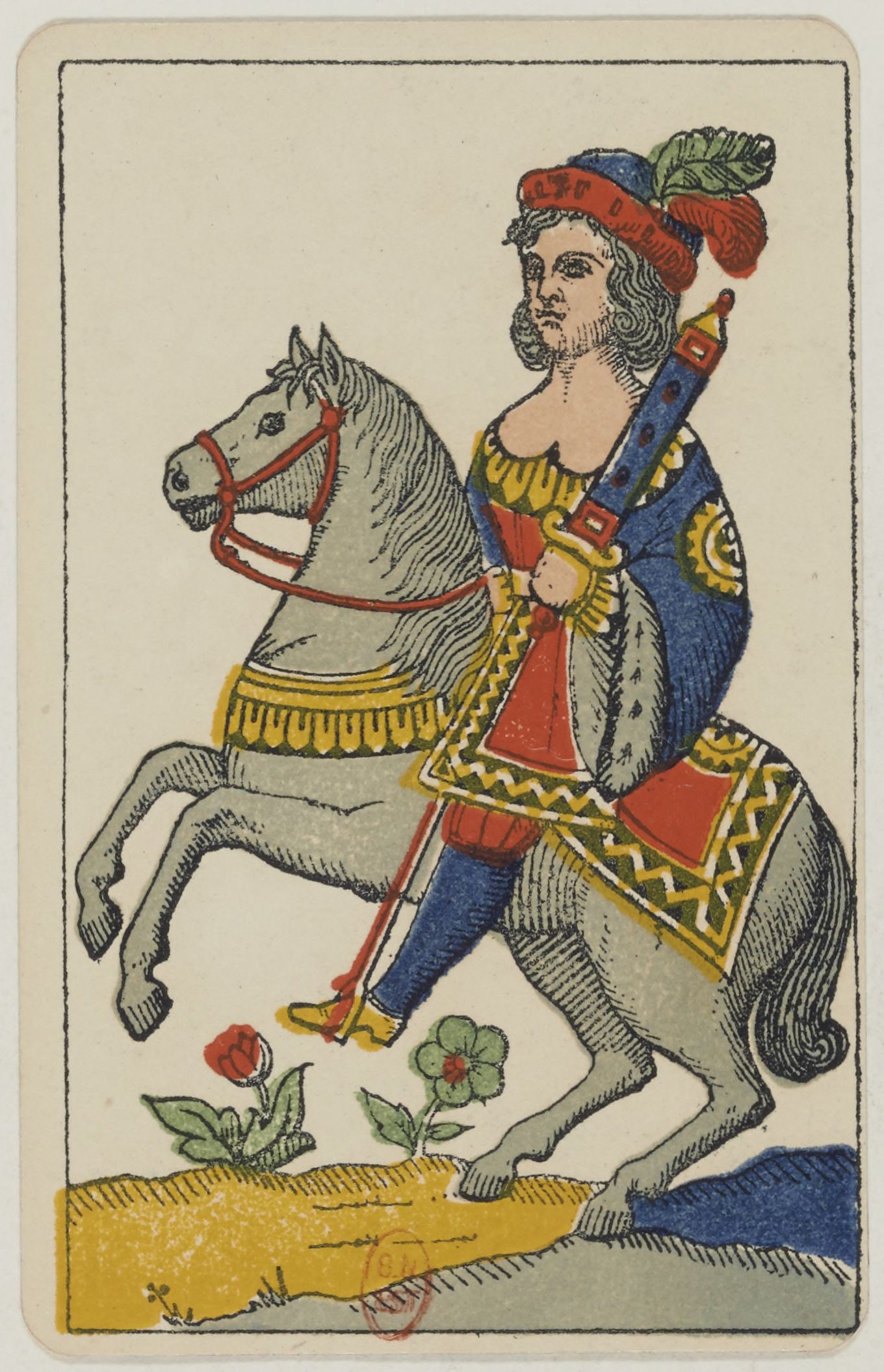
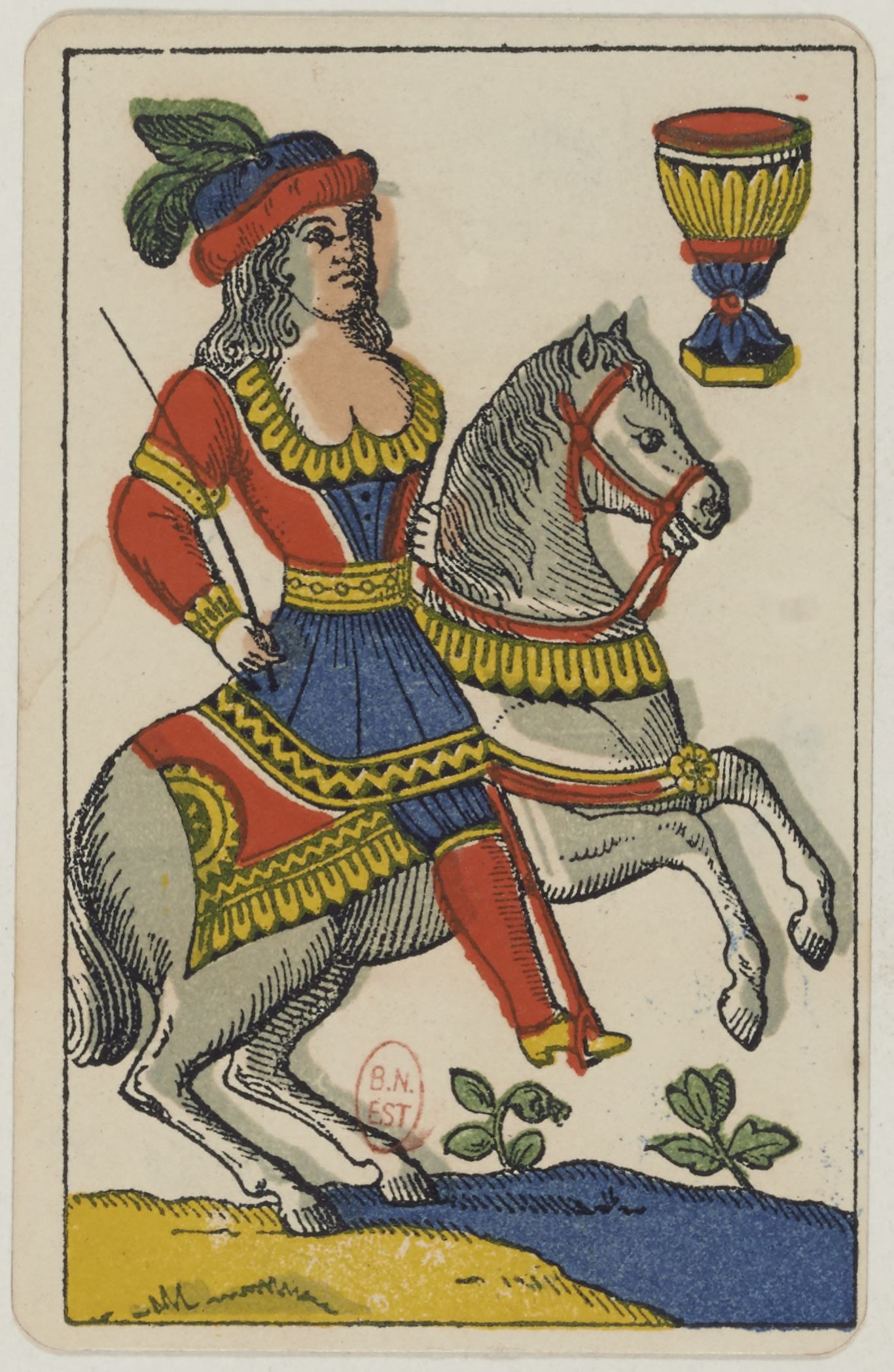
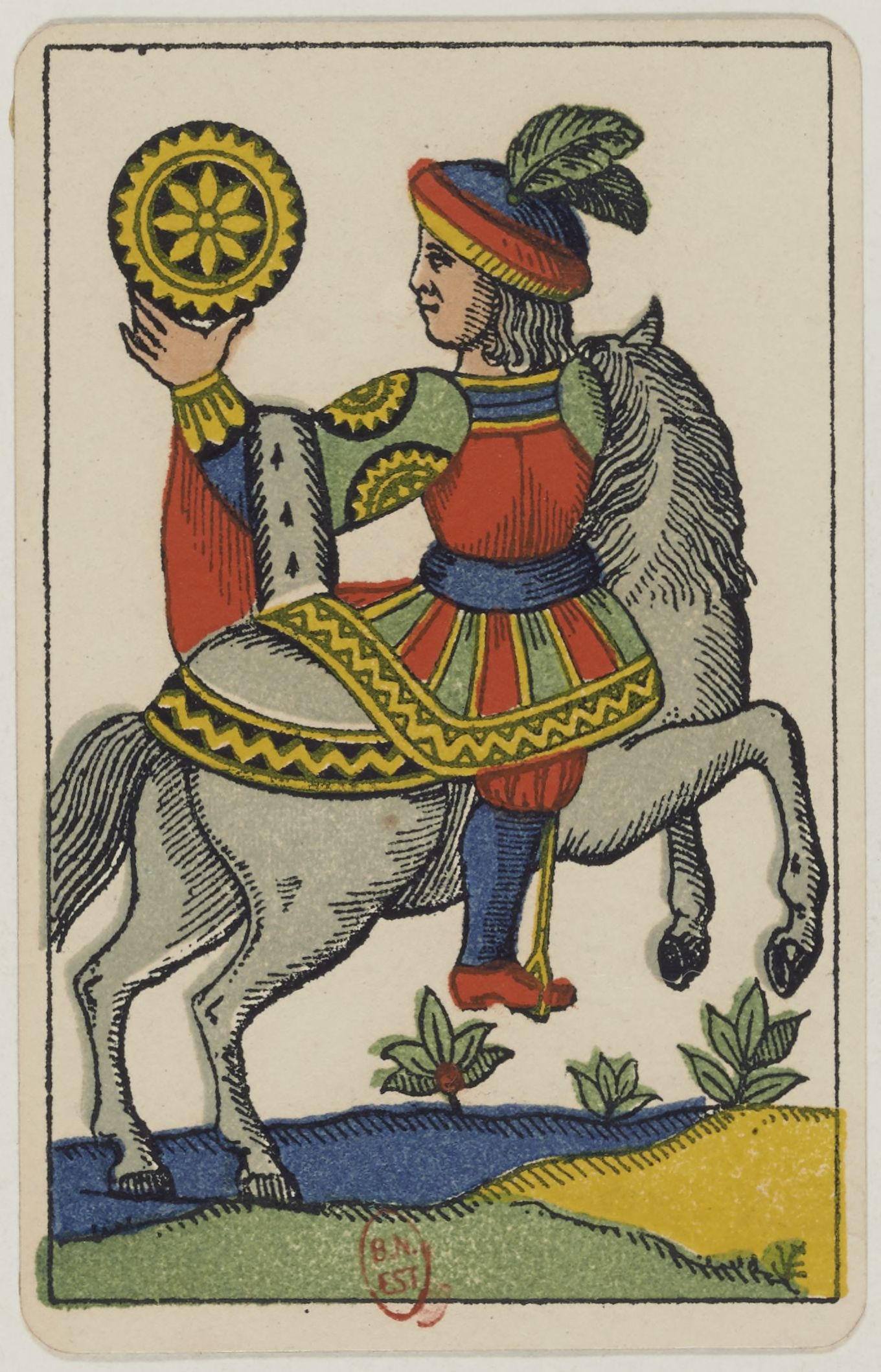
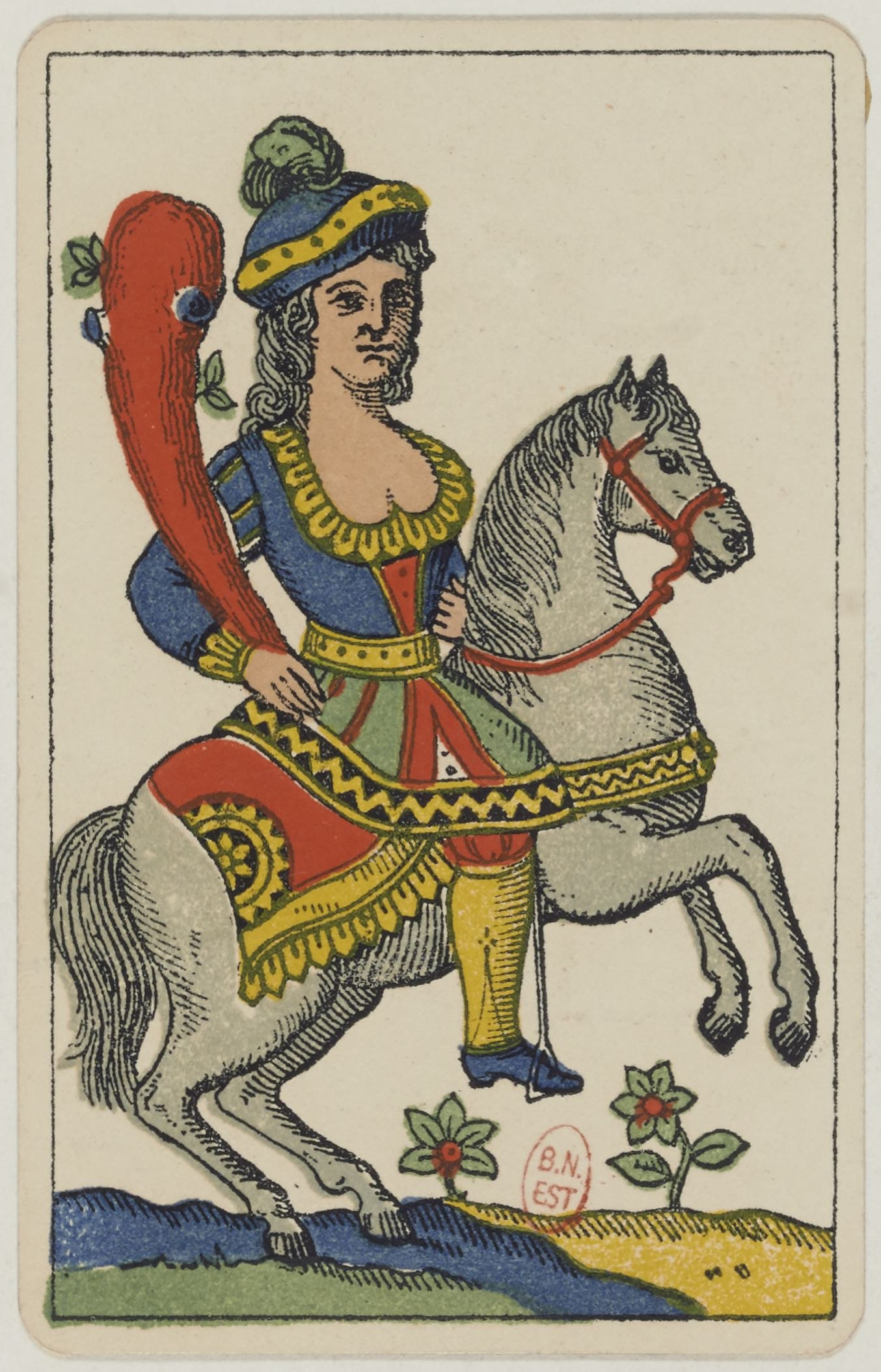
Bergamo pattern (top) and Aluette (bottom)
German-suited obers
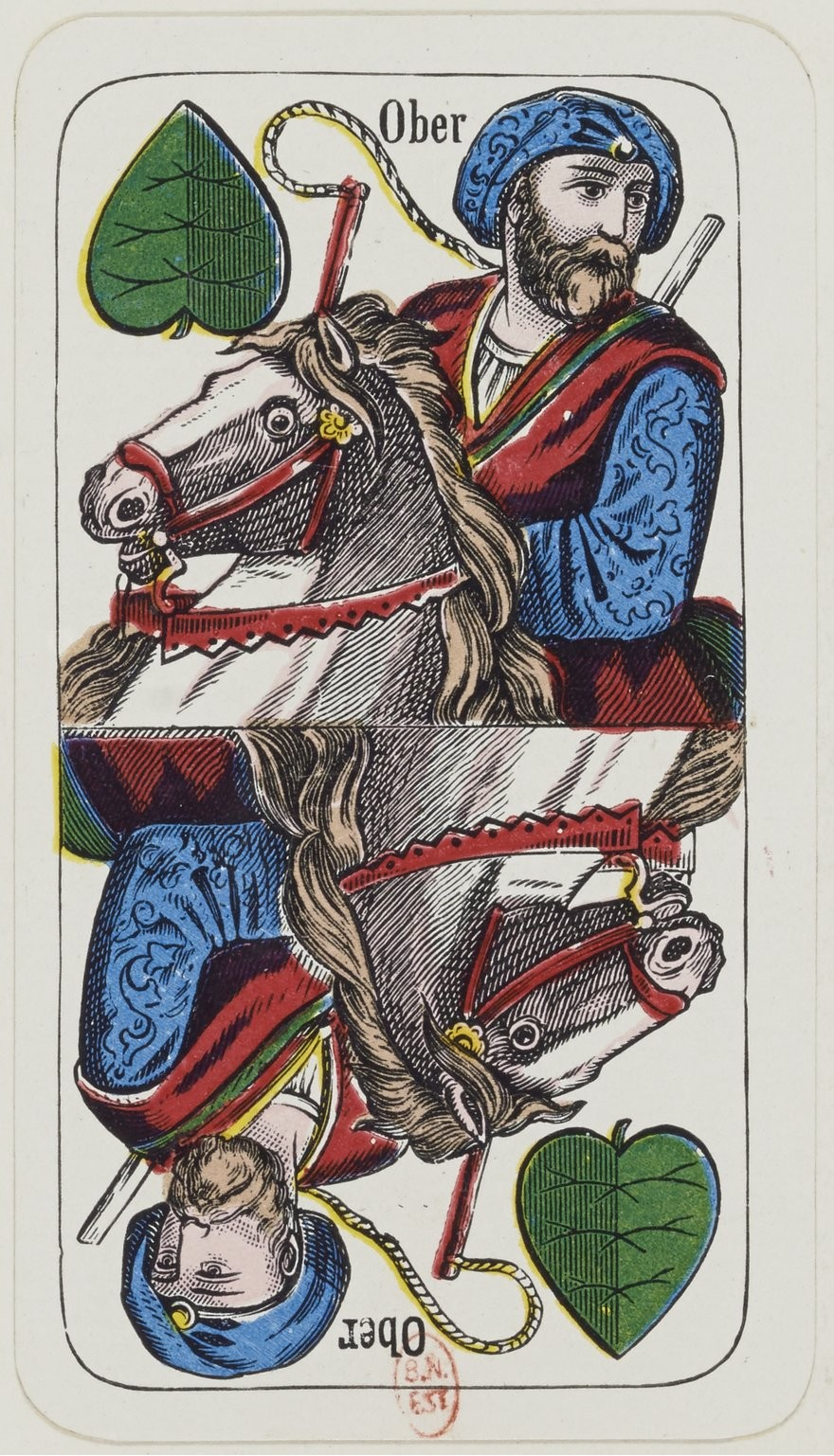
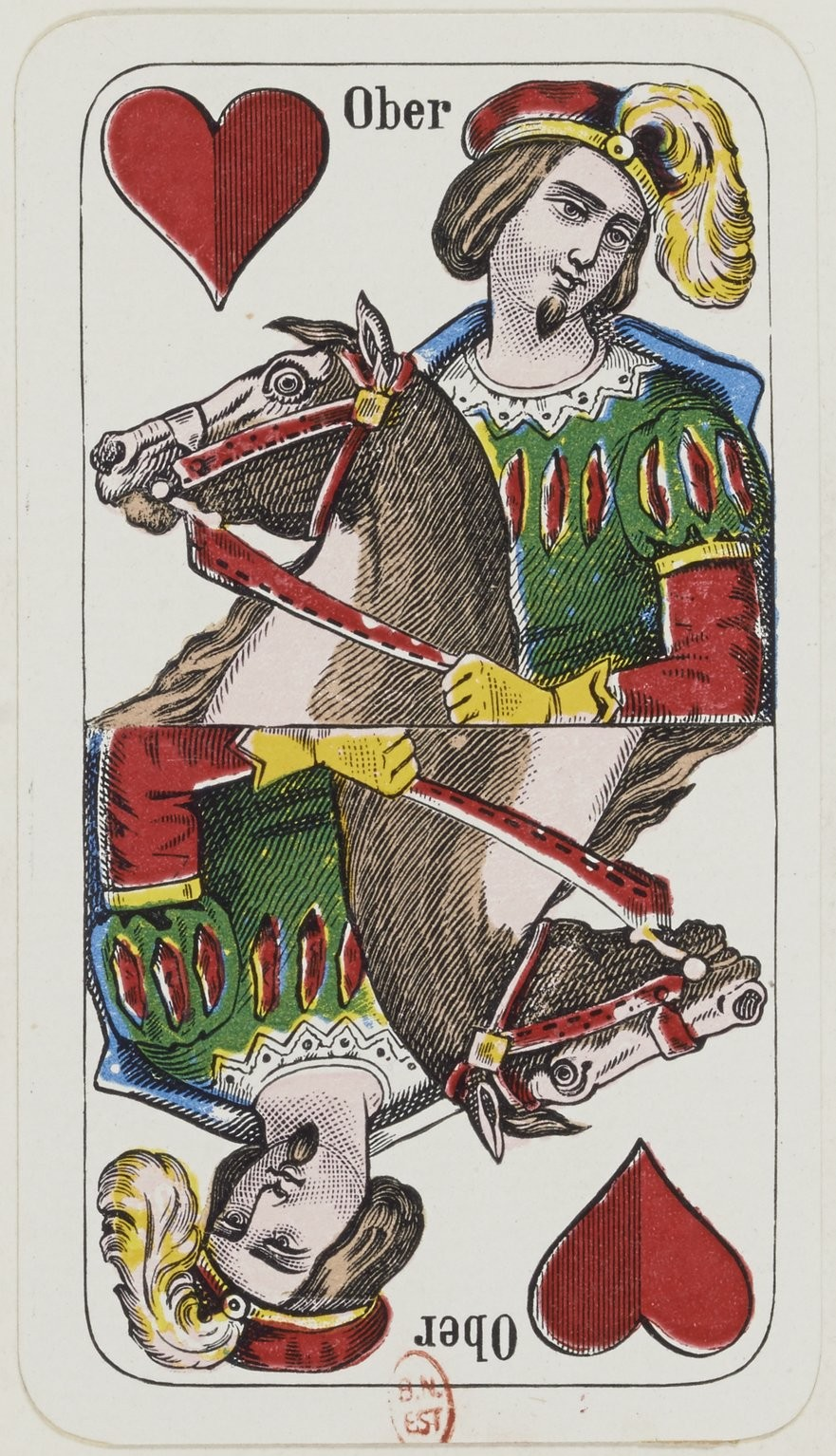
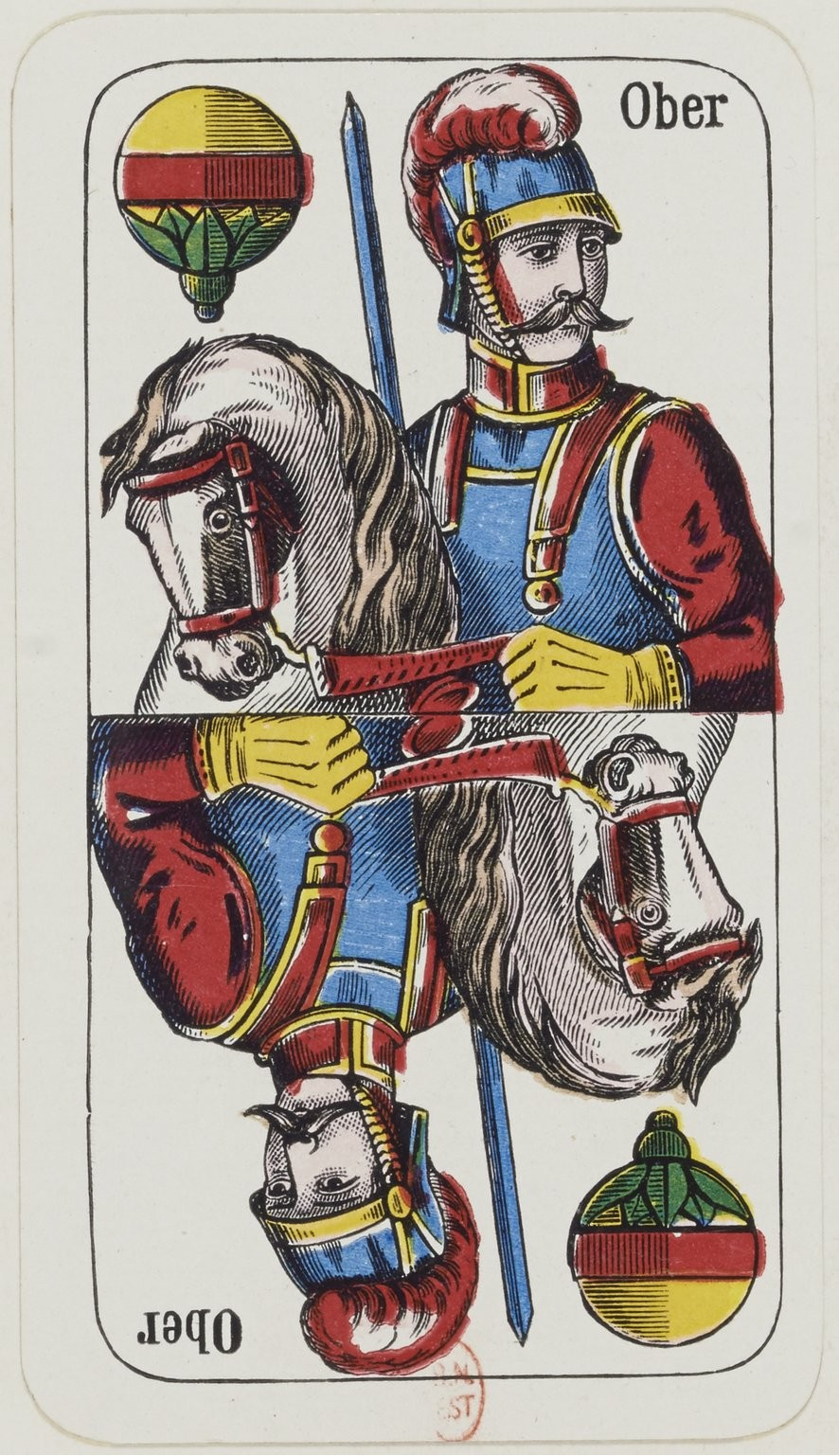
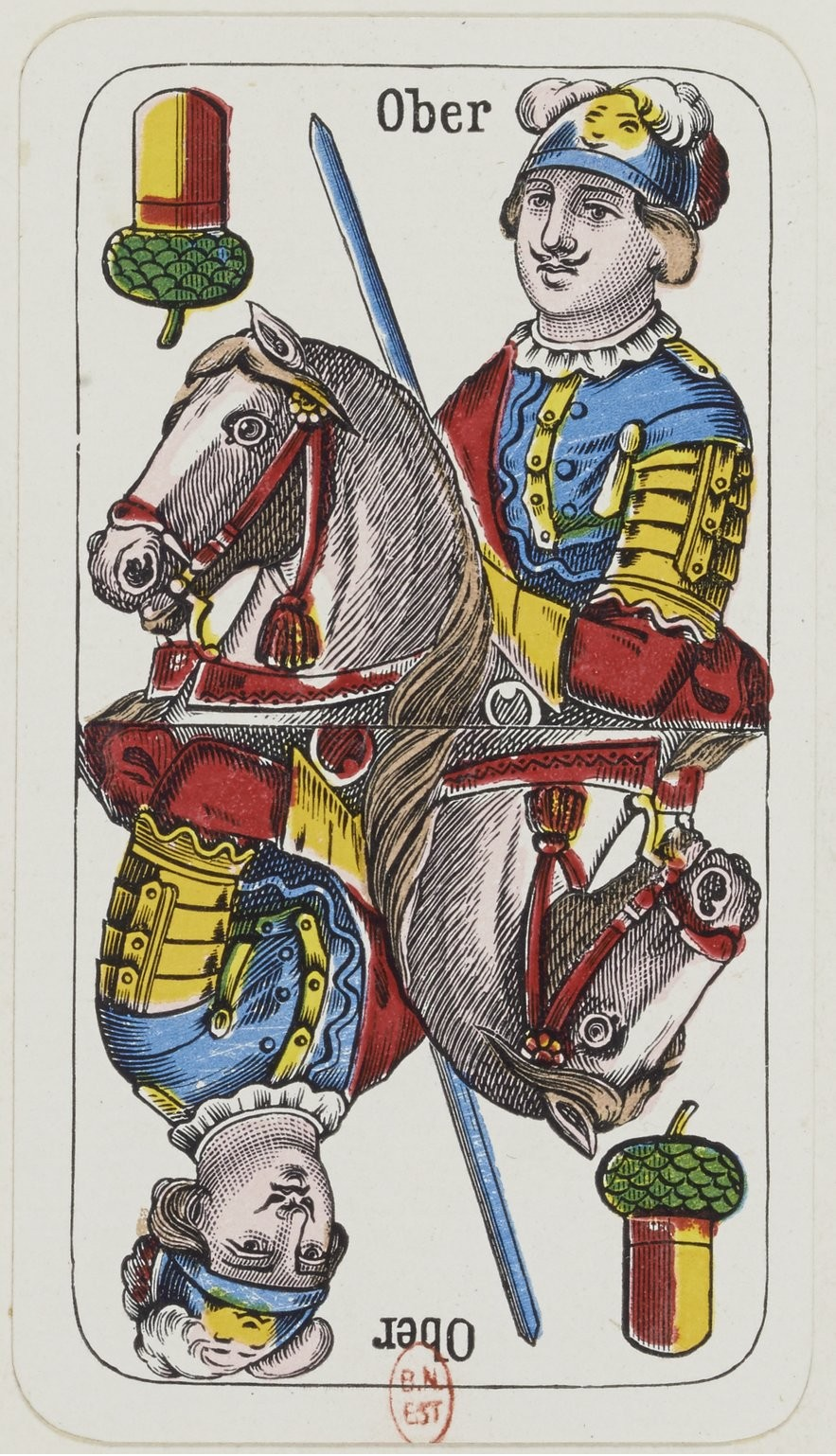
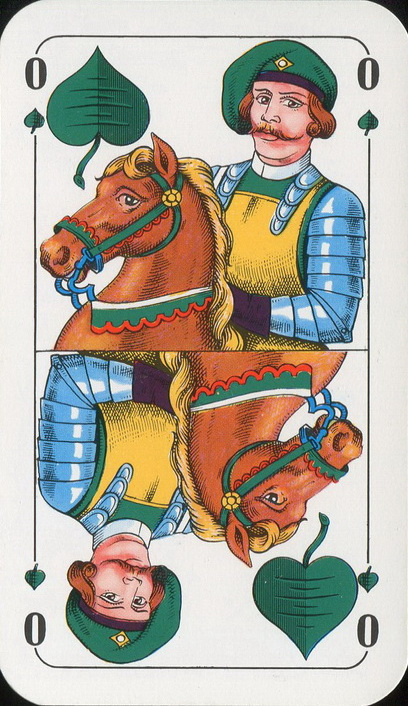
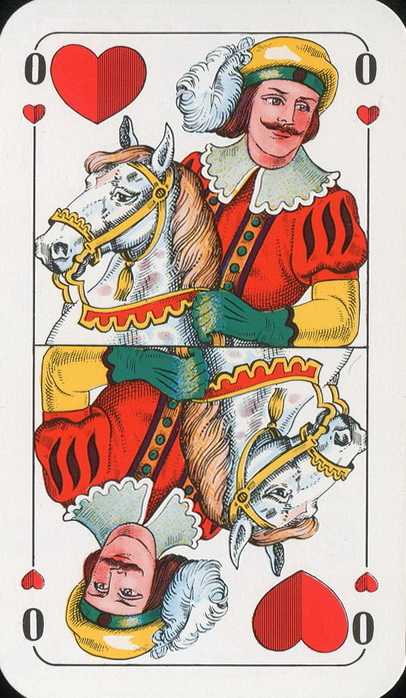
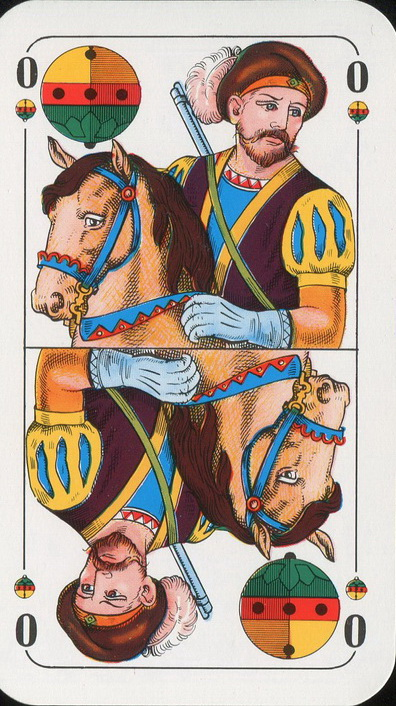
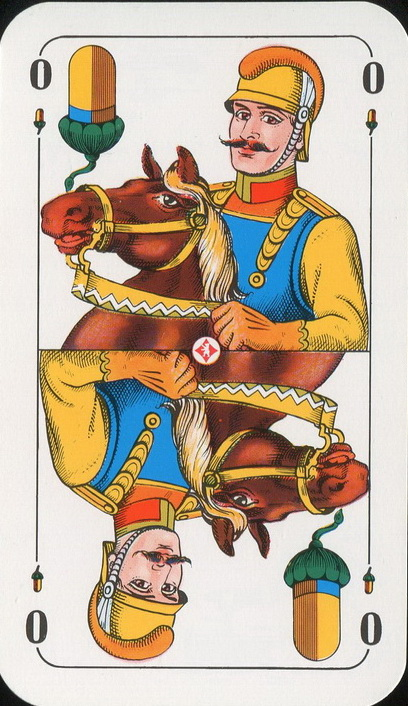
Württemberg pattern old (top) and new (bottom) types
French-suited cavaliers
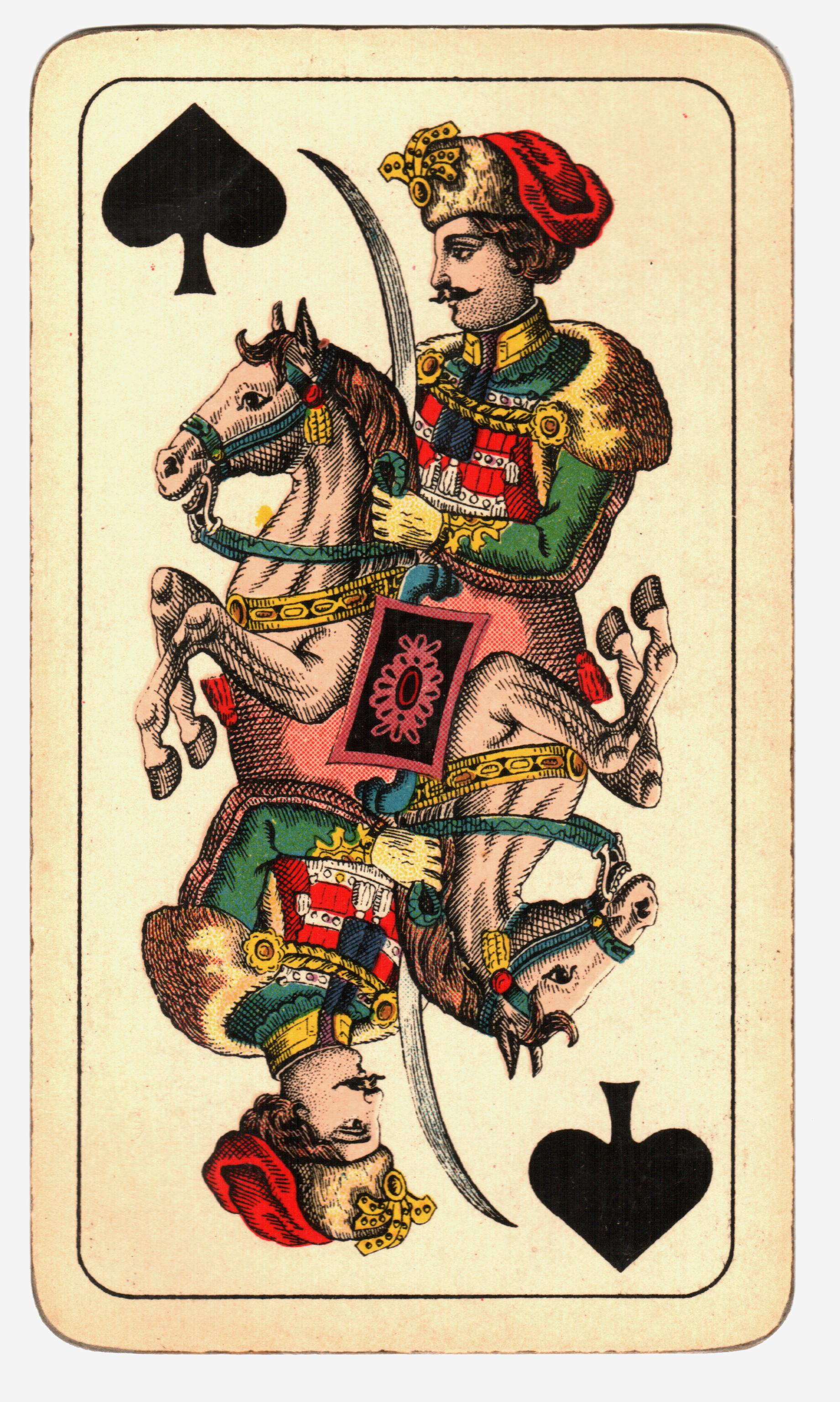
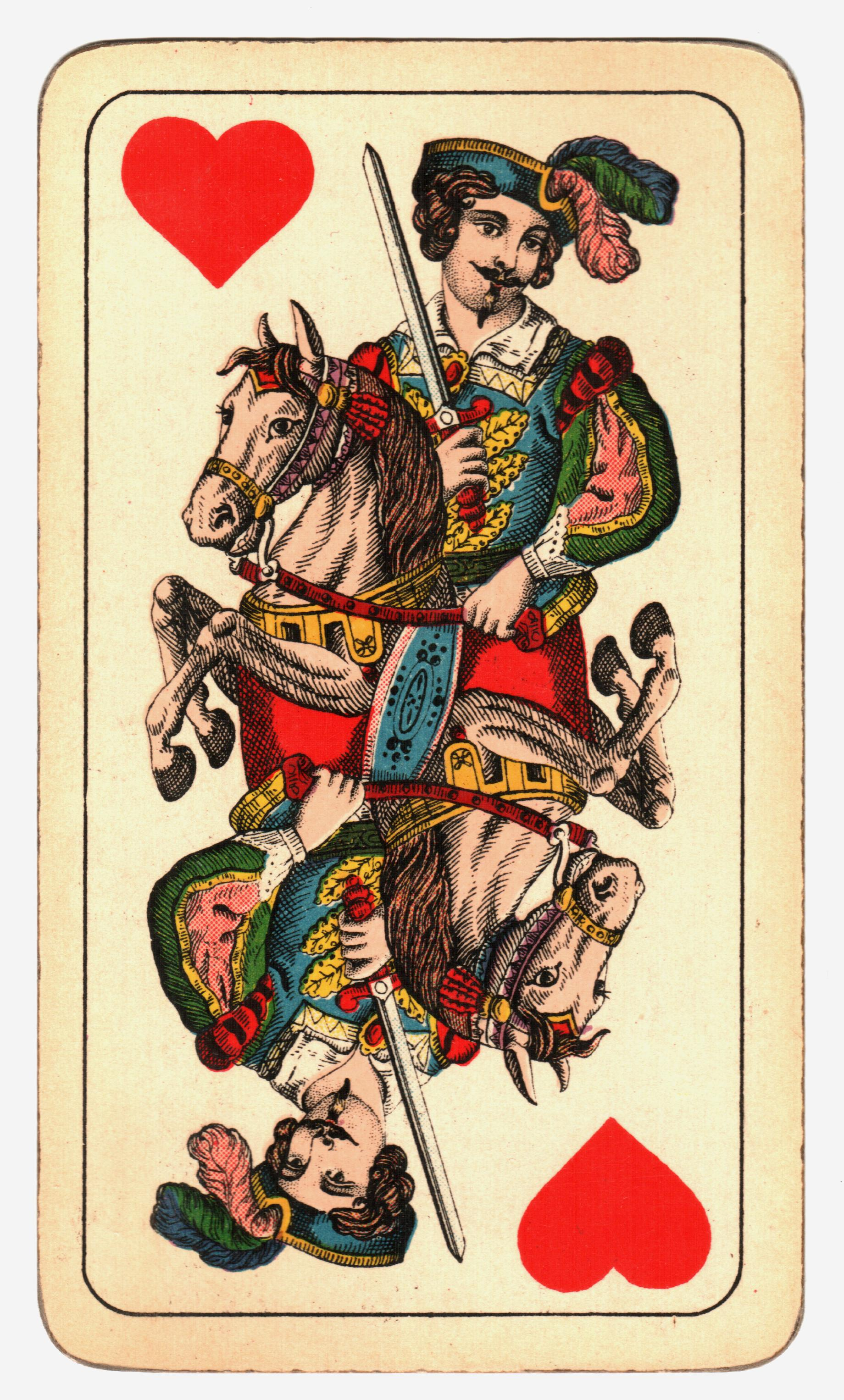
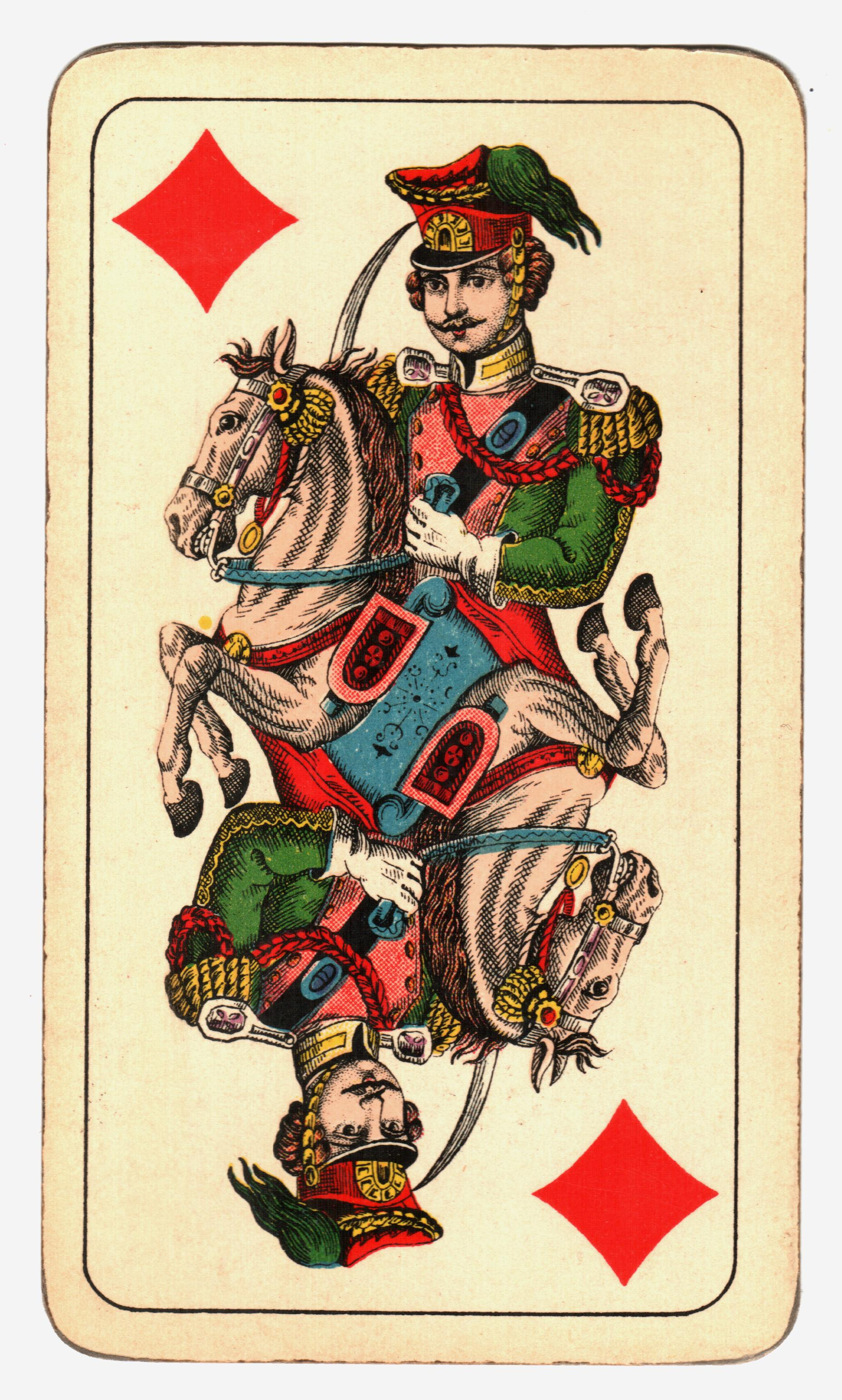
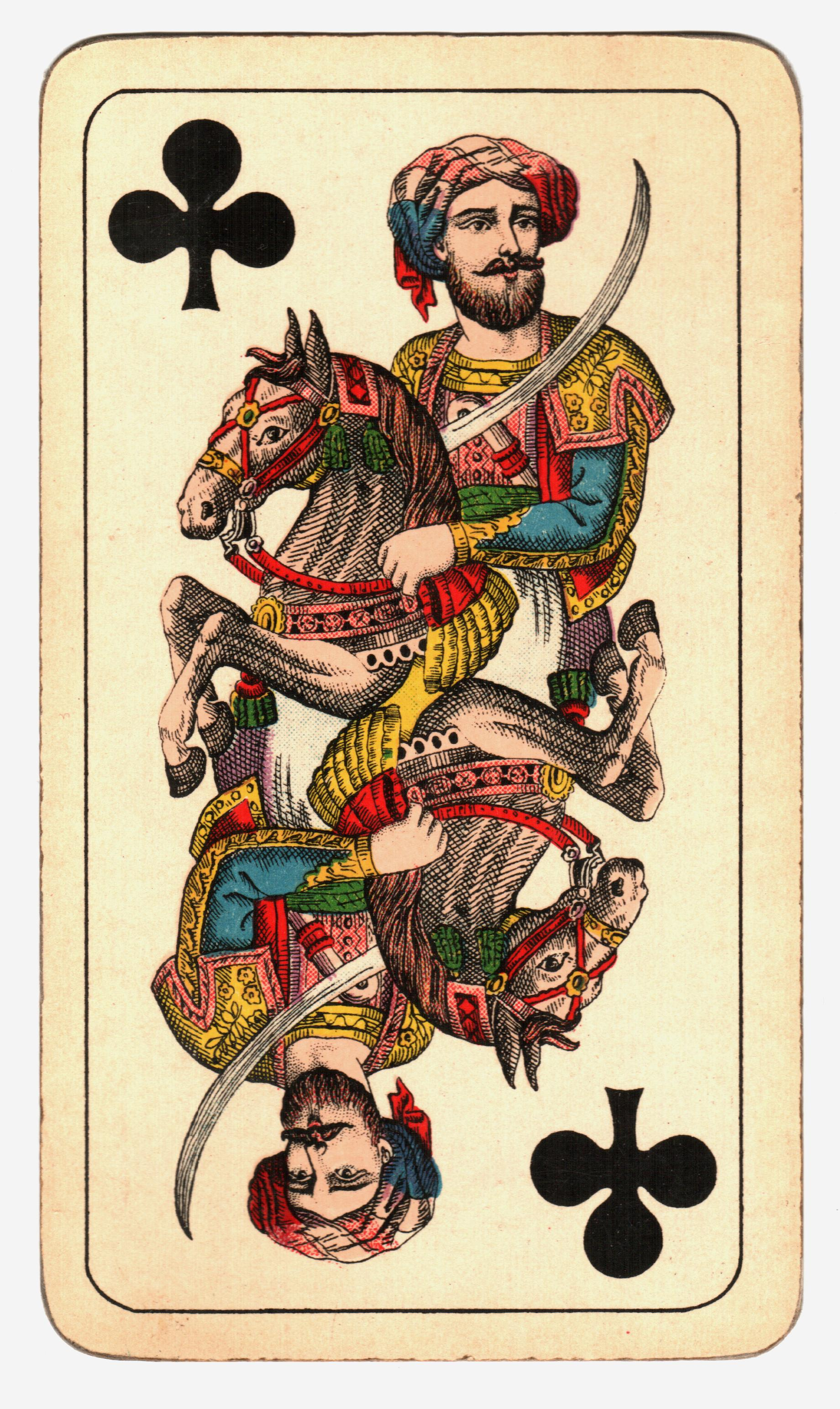
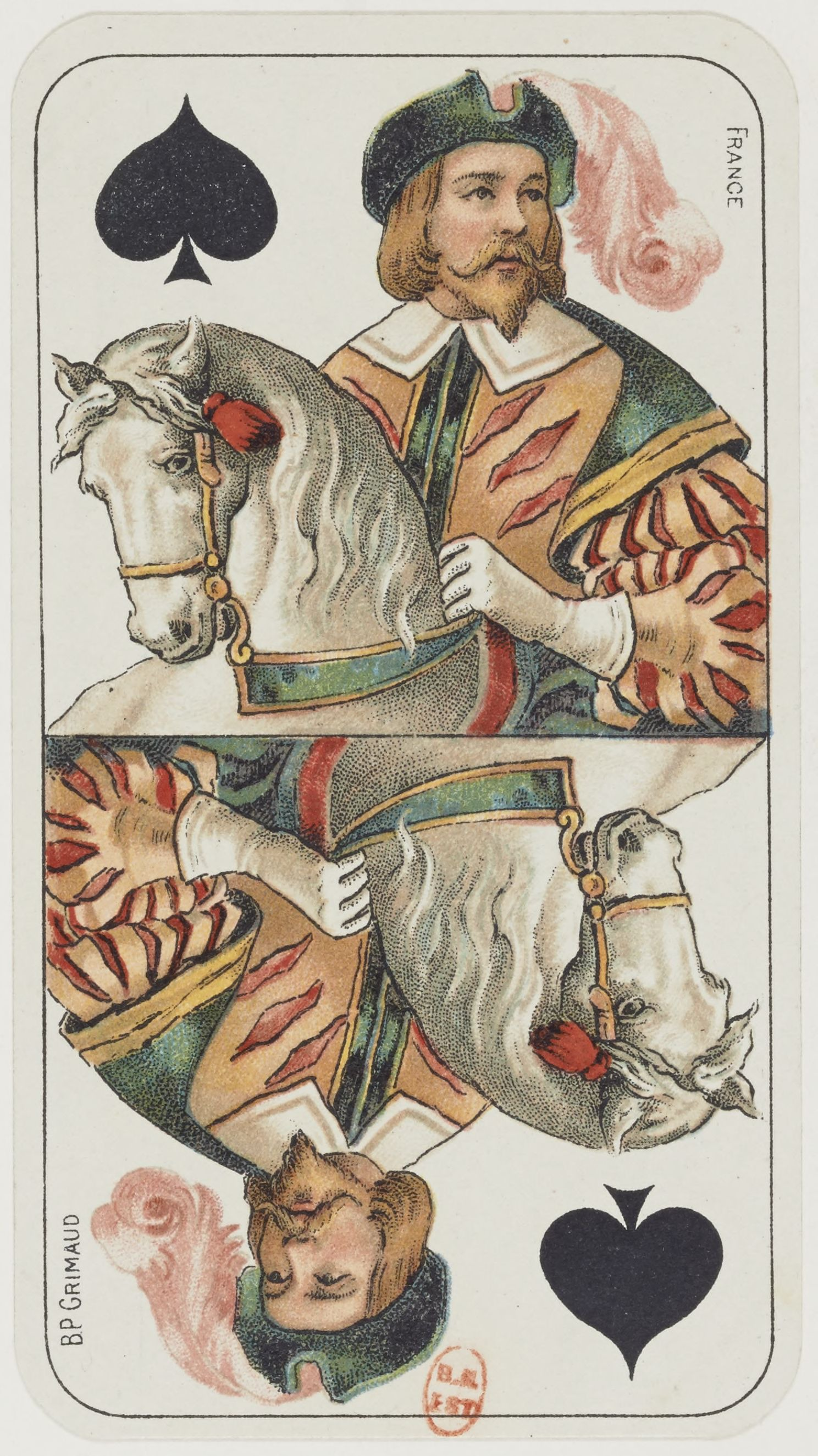
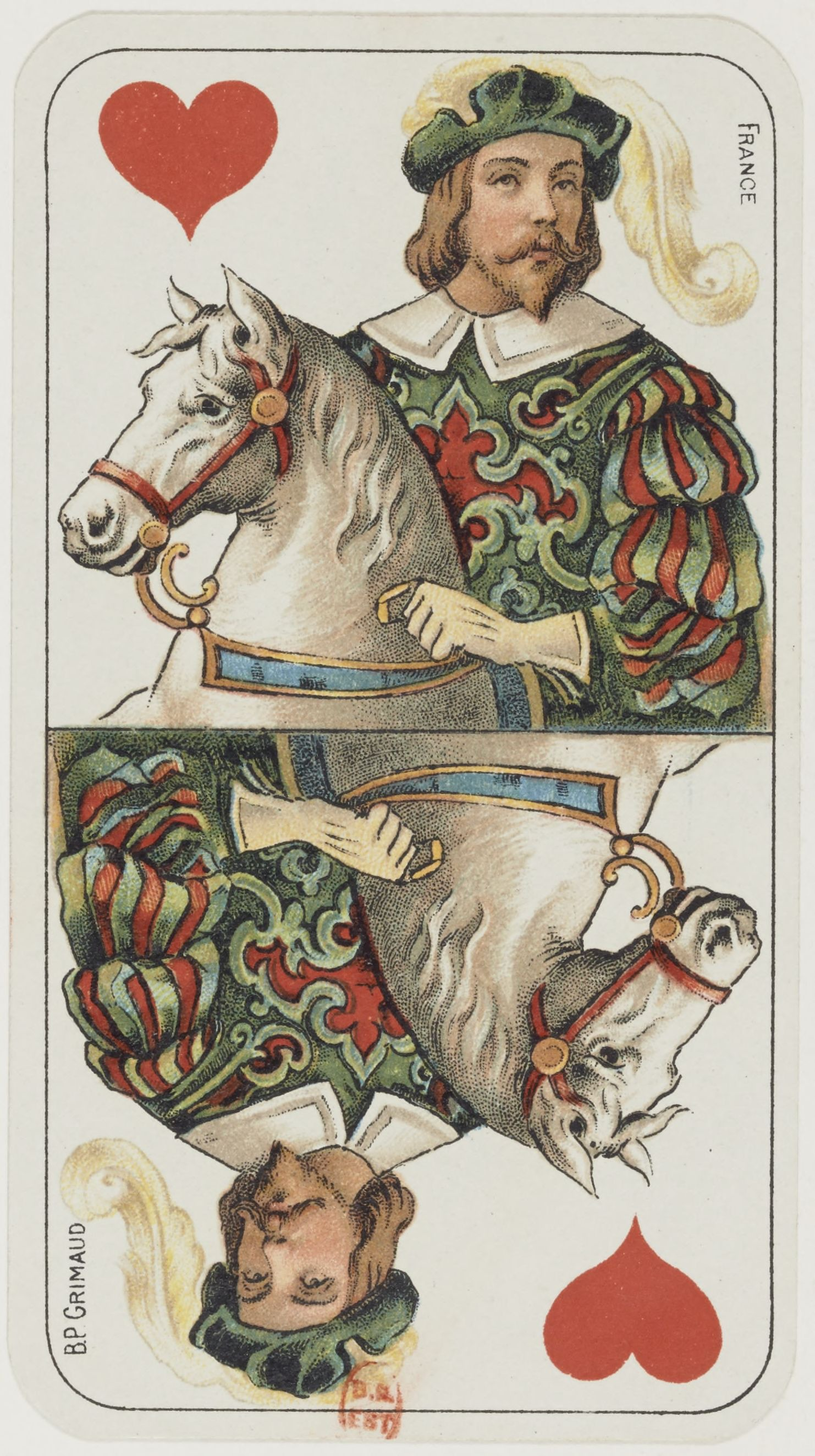
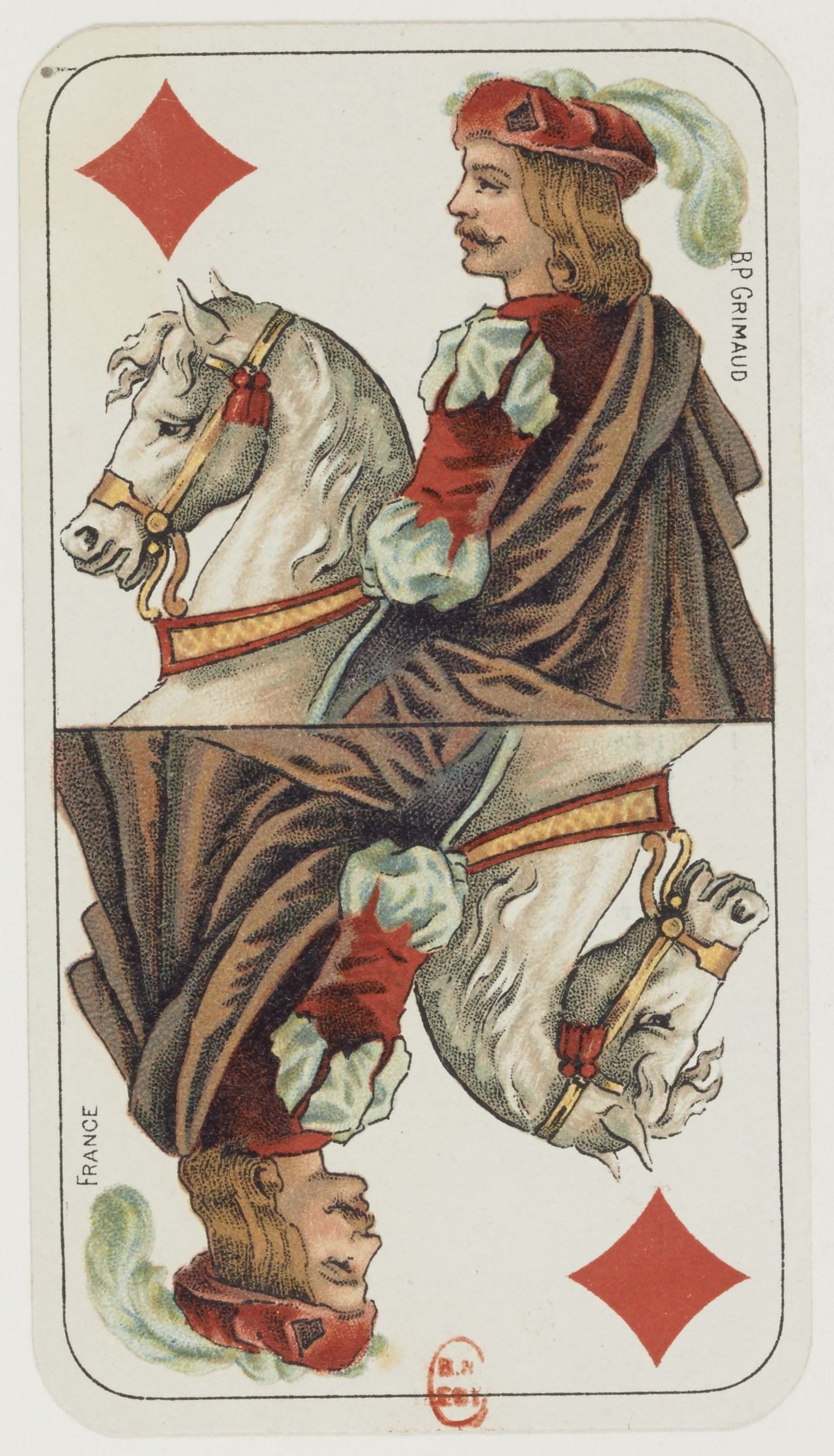
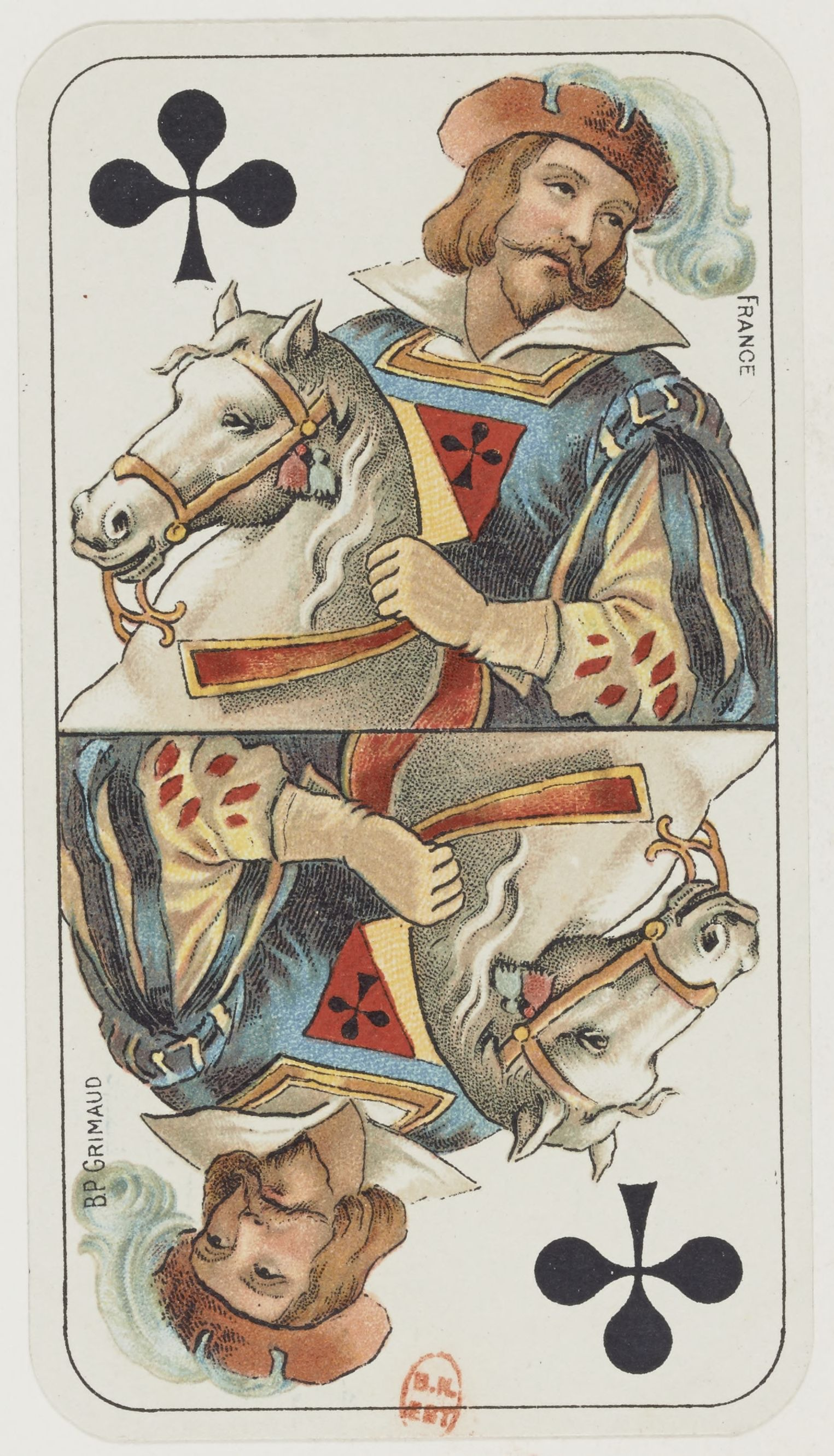
Industrie und Glück (top) and Tarot Nouveau (bottom)

== In Unicode ==
The knights are included in the Playing Cards:

- U+1F0AC 🂬 PLAYING CARD KNIGHT OF SPADES
- U+1F0BC 🂼 PLAYING CARD KNIGHT OF HEARTS
- U+1F0CC 🃌 PLAYING CARD KNIGHT OF DIAMONDS
- U+1F0DC 🃜 PLAYING CARD KNIGHT OF CLUBS
