= Playing Cards (Unicode block) =

- Range: U+1F0A0..U+1F0FF (96 code points)
- Plane: SMP
- Scripts: Common
- Symbol sets: Playing cards symbols
- Assigned: 82 code points
- Unused: 14 reserved code points

Unicode Version History
- 6.0 (2010): 59 (+59)
- 7.0 (2014): 82 (+23)

Unicode documentation
- Code chart ∣ Web page

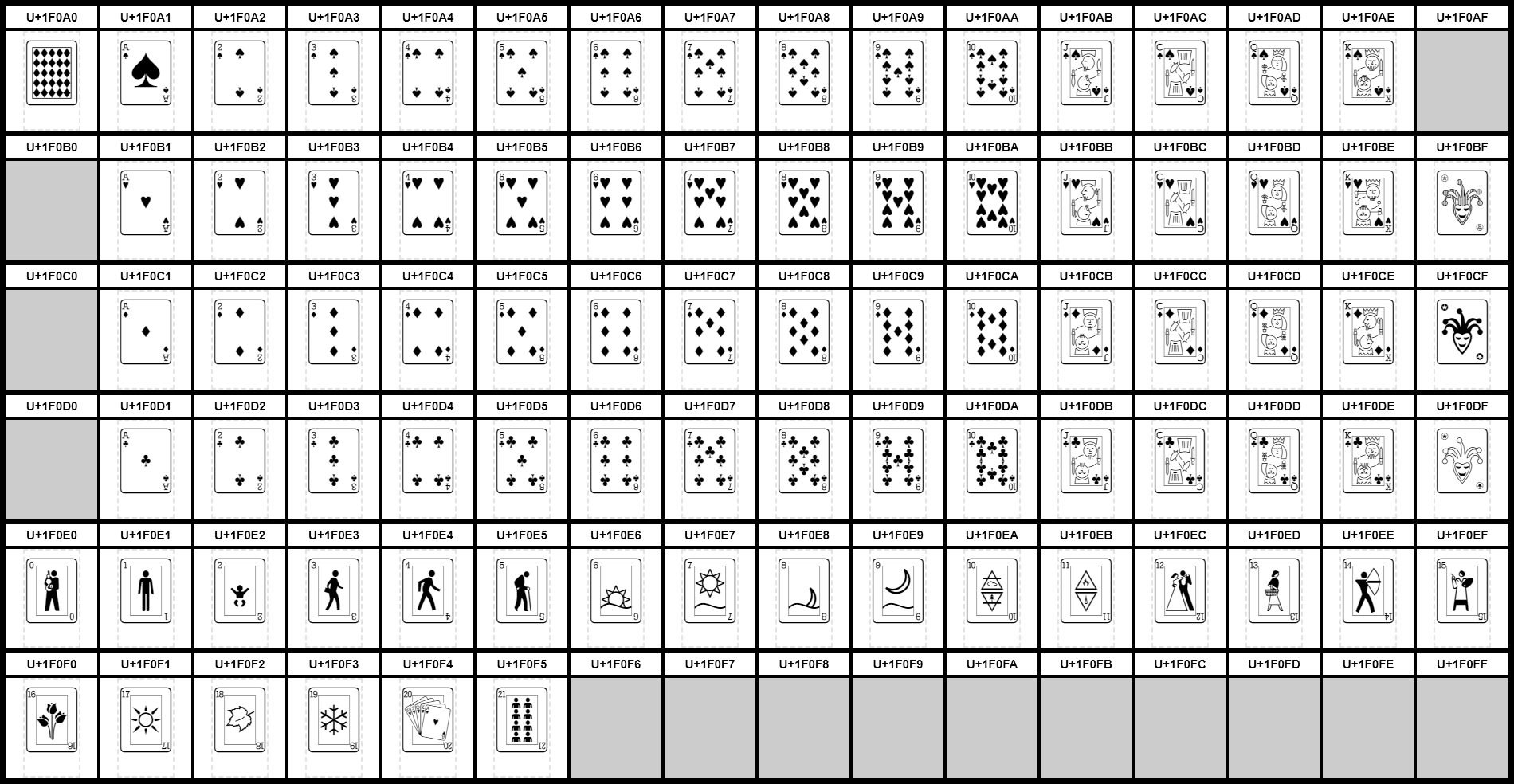
Graphical representation of the Playing Cards Unicode block

The Unicode block Playing Cards contains a full 56-card deck for the Minor Arcana (i.e., a standard 52-card deck with King, Queen, and Jack face cards plus a Knight for all four suits), three jokers, The Fool tarot card, 21 trump cards from the Tarot Nouveau, and a backside.

== Unification ==
Unicode unifies several ranks that may be considered different by some players:

- Ace with One (1)
- Jack with Page and Under Knave
- Knight with Cavalier and Over Knave

It also unifies the various suits, using the English names for the French pattern:

- Spades with Leaves, Shields, Pikes and Swords
- Hearts with Roses and Cups
- Diamonds with Tiles, Bells, Coins and Pentacles
- Clubs with Clovers, Batons, Wands and Acorns

Proposals to disunify mundane playing cards from esoteric, arcane tarot cards were rejected in 2011.

== Chart ==
Playing Cards^{[1]}^{[2]} Official Unicode Consortium code chart (PDF)
	0	1	2	3	4	5	6	7	8	9	A	B	C	D	E	F
U+1F0Ax	🂠	🂡	🂢	🂣	🂤	🂥	🂦	🂧	🂨	🂩	🂪	🂫	🂬	🂭	🂮	
U+1F0Bx		🂱	🂲	🂳	🂴	🂵	🂶	🂷	🂸	🂹	🂺	🂻	🂼	🂽	🂾	🂿
U+1F0Cx		🃁	🃂	🃃	🃄	🃅	🃆	🃇	🃈	🃉	🃊	🃋	🃌	🃍	🃎	🃏
U+1F0Dx		🃑	🃒	🃓	🃔	🃕	🃖	🃗	🃘	🃙	🃚	🃛	🃜	🃝	🃞	🃟
U+1F0Ex	🃠	🃡	🃢	🃣	🃤	🃥	🃦	🃧	🃨	🃩	🃪	🃫	🃬	🃭	🃮	🃯
U+1F0Fx	🃰	🃱	🃲	🃳	🃴	🃵										
Notes 1.As of Unicode version 18.0 2.Grey areas indicate non-assigned code points

=== Emoji ===
The Playing Cards block contains one emoji: U+1F0CF 🃏 PLAYING CARD BLACK JOKER.

== History ==
The following Unicode-related documents record the purpose and process of defining specific characters in the Playing Cards block:

Version	Final code points (Note: Proposed code points and characters names may differ from final code points and names)	Count	L2 ID	WG2 ID	Document
6.0	U+1F0A0..1F0AE, 1F0B1..1F0BE, 1F0C1..1F0CF, 1F0D1..1F0DF (Note: Refer to the history section of the Miscellaneous Symbols and Pictographs block for additional emoji-related documents)	59	L2/04-163	N2760	Everson, Michael (2004-05-18), Proposal to encode dominoes and other game symbols in the UCS
6.0	U+1F0A0..1F0AE, 1F0B1..1F0BE, 1F0C1..1F0CF, 1F0D1..1F0DF	59	L2/06-288		Pentzlin, Karl (2006-08-06), Comments on L2/04-163 - Domino tiles and other game symbols
6.0	U+1F0A0..1F0AE, 1F0B1..1F0BE, 1F0C1..1F0CF, 1F0D1..1F0DF	59	L2/09-025R2	N3582 (Note: Japanese translation of N3582 is available as N3621)	Scherer, Markus; Davis, Mark; Momoi, Kat; Tong, Darick; Kida, Yasuo; Edberg, Peter (2009-03-05), Proposal for Encoding Emoji Symbols
6.0	U+1F0A0..1F0AE, 1F0B1..1F0BE, 1F0C1..1F0CF, 1F0D1..1F0DF	59	L2/09-026R	N3583	Scherer, Markus; Davis, Mark; Momoi, Kat; Tong, Darick; Kida, Yasuo; Edberg, Peter (2009-02-06), Emoji Symbols Proposed for New Encoding
6.0	U+1F0A0..1F0AE, 1F0B1..1F0BE, 1F0C1..1F0CF, 1F0D1..1F0DF	59	L2/09-027R2	N3681	Scherer, Markus (2009-09-17), Emoji Symbols: Background Data
6.0	U+1F0A0..1F0AE, 1F0B1..1F0BE, 1F0C1..1F0CF, 1F0D1..1F0DF	59	L2/09-114	N3607	Towards an encoding of symbol characters used as emoji, 2009-04-06, added Playing Cards to complement joker.
6.0	U+1F0A0..1F0AE, 1F0B1..1F0BE, 1F0C1..1F0CF, 1F0D1..1F0DF	59		N3603	"M54.12", Unconfirmed minutes of WG 2 meeting 54, 2009-07-08
6.0	U+1F0A0..1F0AE, 1F0B1..1F0BE, 1F0C1..1F0CF, 1F0D1..1F0DF	59	L2/10-089	N3777	KDDI Input on Emoji, 2010-03-08
6.0	U+1F0A0..1F0AE, 1F0B1..1F0BE, 1F0C1..1F0CF, 1F0D1..1F0DF	59	L2/10-132		Scherer, Markus; Davis, Mark; Momoi, Kat; Tong, Darick; Kida, Yasuo; Edberg, Peter (2010-04-27), Emoji Symbols: Background Data
7.0	U+1F0BF, 1F0E0..1F0F5	23	L2/11-095	N4012	Everson, Michael; Pentzlin, Karl (2011-04-01), Proposal to encode additional playing card characters in the UCS
7.0	U+1F0BF, 1F0E0..1F0F5	23	L2/11-102 (pdf, txt)		Davis, Mark (2011-04-06), Clarification of Tarot cards
7.0	U+1F0BF, 1F0E0..1F0F5	23	L2/11-216	N4089	Everson, Michael; Pentzlin, Karl (2011-05-31), Proposal to disunify playing card and tarot card characters in the UCS
7.0	U+1F0BF, 1F0E0..1F0F5	23	L2/11-261R2		Moore, Lisa (2011-08-16), "Motion 128-M2", UTC #128 / L2 #225 Minutes
7.0	U+1F0BF, 1F0E0..1F0F5	23		N4253 (pdf, doc)	"M59.12", Unconfirmed minutes of WG 2 meeting 59, 2012-09-12
