= Charlemagne (disambiguation) =

Charlemagne (742/747–814) was King of the Franks from 768 to 814 and Emperor of the Holy Roman Empire from 800 to 814.

Charlemagne may also refer to:

== People ==
- Charlemagne (given name)
- Charlemagne (surname)
- Charlamagne tha God, stage name of American radio personality Lenard McKelvey (born 1978)

== Arts and entertainment ==
- Charlemagne (band), an American indie rock band
- Charlemagne (songwriting team), a songwriting team with Motown
- "Charlemagne" (song), a 2016 song by English indie group Blossoms
- Charlemagne (comics), a comic book series
- Charlemagne, or the Distracted Emperor, a c. 1600 play
- Charlemagne: By the Sword and the Cross, a 2010 symphonic metal concept album by Christopher Lee
- Charlemagne: The Omens of Death, a 2013 heavy metal concept album by Christopher Lee
- Charlemagne (film), a 1933 French film
- Charlemagne, le prince à cheval, a 1993 television miniseries
- Charlemagne, a Simon Kidgits bird character developed by Simon Brand Ventures

== Places ==
- Charlemagne, Quebec, a suburb of Montreal, Canada
- Charlemagne, a crater on Saturn's moon Iapetus (moon)

== Military ==
- French ship Charlemagne (1807), a ship of the line
- French ship Charlemagne (1851), a ship of the line
- Charlemagne-class battleship, a class of French battleship
  - French battleship Charlemagne, an 1895 battleship, lead ship of the class
- 33rd Waffen Grenadier Division of the SS Charlemagne

== Honors ==
- Order of Charlemagne, a decoration of Andorra
- Charlemagne Prize, an award for service furthering European unification

== Other uses ==
- Charlemagne (wine)
- Cours Charlemagne, a street in Lyon, France
- Rue Charlemagne, a street in Paris, France
- Lycée Charlemagne, a school in the Marais quarter of Paris
- Charlemagne building, a Brussels high-rise of the European Commission
- Charlemagne Tower, Tours, France, a remnant of a former basilica
- Charlemagne Viaduct, a bridge across the Meuse River in Belgium
- Patinoire Charlemagne, an ice-rink in Lyon

== See also ==
- Corton-Charlemagne, a wine and vineyard of Burgundy
- Villiers-Charlemagne, a commune of France
- Peter II, Count of Savoy (1203–1268), called "the Little Charlemagne"
