= Charlemagne (surname) =

Charlemagne is the surname of:

- Adolf Charlemagne (1826–1901), Russian painter, son of Iosif Ivanovich Charlemagne
- Diane Charlemagne (1964–2015), British singer and songwriter
- Iosif Iosifovich Charlemagne (1824–1870), Russian architect and painter, son of Iosif Ivanovich Charlemagne
- Iosif Ivanovich Charlemagne (1782–1861), Russian architect and state councillor, father of Adolf and Iosif Iosifovich Charlemagne, brother of Ludwig Charlemagne
- Jean Armand Charlemagne (1753–1838), French author of plays, poems and romances
- Ludwig Charlemagne (1784–1845), Russian architect, brother of Iosif Ivanovich Charlemagne
- Manno Charlemagne (1948–2017), Haitian folk singer, songwriter, musician and politician
- Marcus Charlemagne (born 1978), Saint Lucian cricketer
- Maxime Charlemagne (born 1974), Saint Lucian sprinter
- Mikaili Charlemagne (born 2003), Saint Lucian swimmer
