= Charlemagne Tower, Tours =

Church tower in Tours, France

- Tour Charlemagne
- Tour Charlemagne, Tours, 2019
- Interactive map of the Charlemagne Tower, Tours area

General information
- Type: Church Steeple
- Architectural style: Romanesque architecture
- Location: 83 Rue des Halles, 37000, Tours, France
- Coordinates: 47°23′36″N 0°40′57″E
- Construction started: 11^{th} century

Height
- Height: 48 metres (157 ft)

Technical details
- Floor count: 3

The Charlemagne Tower is, along with the Clock Tower (French: Tour de l'Horloge), a remnant of the former basilica dedicated to Saint Martin of Tours. It is located in Rue des Halles, in the old town district.

The tower had been registered on the French national heritage list on 13 September 1958.

As the legend goes, the tower name comes from Luitgard, Charlemagne's fourth wife, who died in Tours on 4 June 800, during the emperor's stay in the city. Tradition holds that the emperor had her buried beneath or near the building. Nevertheless, opinions are divided regarding the exact location of the sepulchre, which has never been formally identified.

== History ==
=== The Basilica of Saint Martin of Tours ===
Following the burial of Saint Martin of Tours on 11 November 397, several buildings were erected over his tomb:

- a small chapel, constructed between 437 and 477, under the bishopric of Saint Brice;
- an initial basilica, under the bishopric of Saint Perpetuus, which is believed to have been consecrated on 4 July 470 or 471, the anniversary of Saint Martin's election to the Episcopal see of Tours. This temple was damaged by fire and restored several times before eventually falling into ruin.
- Hervé de Buzançais, treasurer of Saint-Martin, decided to rebuild a large Romanesque basilica on the same site. It was consecrated on 4 July 1014, by the Archbishop of Tours, Archambault de Sully. It was built according to the blueprint of the Basilica of Saint-Sernin in Toulouse, completed a few years earlier. The church originally featured three towers: two on the façade and one above the transept.

At a later date, it was decided to build two additional towers at the ends of the transept arms: the Charlemagne Tower to the north and the Cadran Tower or Gibert Tower (English: Dial Tower) to the south.

=== Construction stages and modifications ===
No sources establish a definitive chronology and exact dating of the tower's construction. However, it took place shortly after the erection of the transept, since paintings on the transept walls were obscured by the masonry of the Charlemagne Tower. Furthermore, the stylistic unity excludes any significant time gap between the constructions of the first basilica and the Charlemagne tower. Based on these facts, local archeologist Robert Ranjard proposed the following timeline, which is also relevant for the Cadran Tower, the southern tower -now defunct- that mirrored the Charlemagne Tower.

In the second half of the 11^{th} century, shortly after the completion of the primitive basilica, a roofed tower was built, covering a portal on the northern transept's arm. The construction required the reinforcement of the transept vaults in order to be able to sustain the associated weight. The tower rested upon a new vault erected outside the original transept. It comprised two levels, featuring semicircular barrel vaults representative of the Romanesque architecture; the second floor served as a bell chamber. The external apsidiole of the transept's arm was incorporated into the tower as a sacristy and the identical space on the upper level housed a chapel. The nature and shape of the original roof are unknown, although it is assessed that a spire topped the ensemble.

In the early 14^{th} century, a new story was added to the tower, displaying Gothic architecture elements such as pointed-arch windows. The Romanesque openings on the southern side of the lower floors were walled up so as to increase structural stability. A spire, still present in 17^{th} century descriptions, crowned the tower. It is estimated that the ensemble was around 56 metres (184 ft) tall.

In the 15^{th} century, the third floor was converted into a belfry, vertically divided by a Gothic vault and housing two bells.

It is worth noting that a significant structural flaw existed within the Charlemagne Tower: its northern side rested on dedicated foundations, built at the same time as the tower itself, while its southern section simply laid upon the vaults of the existing transept, which had been slightly reinforced.

=== French Revolution period ===
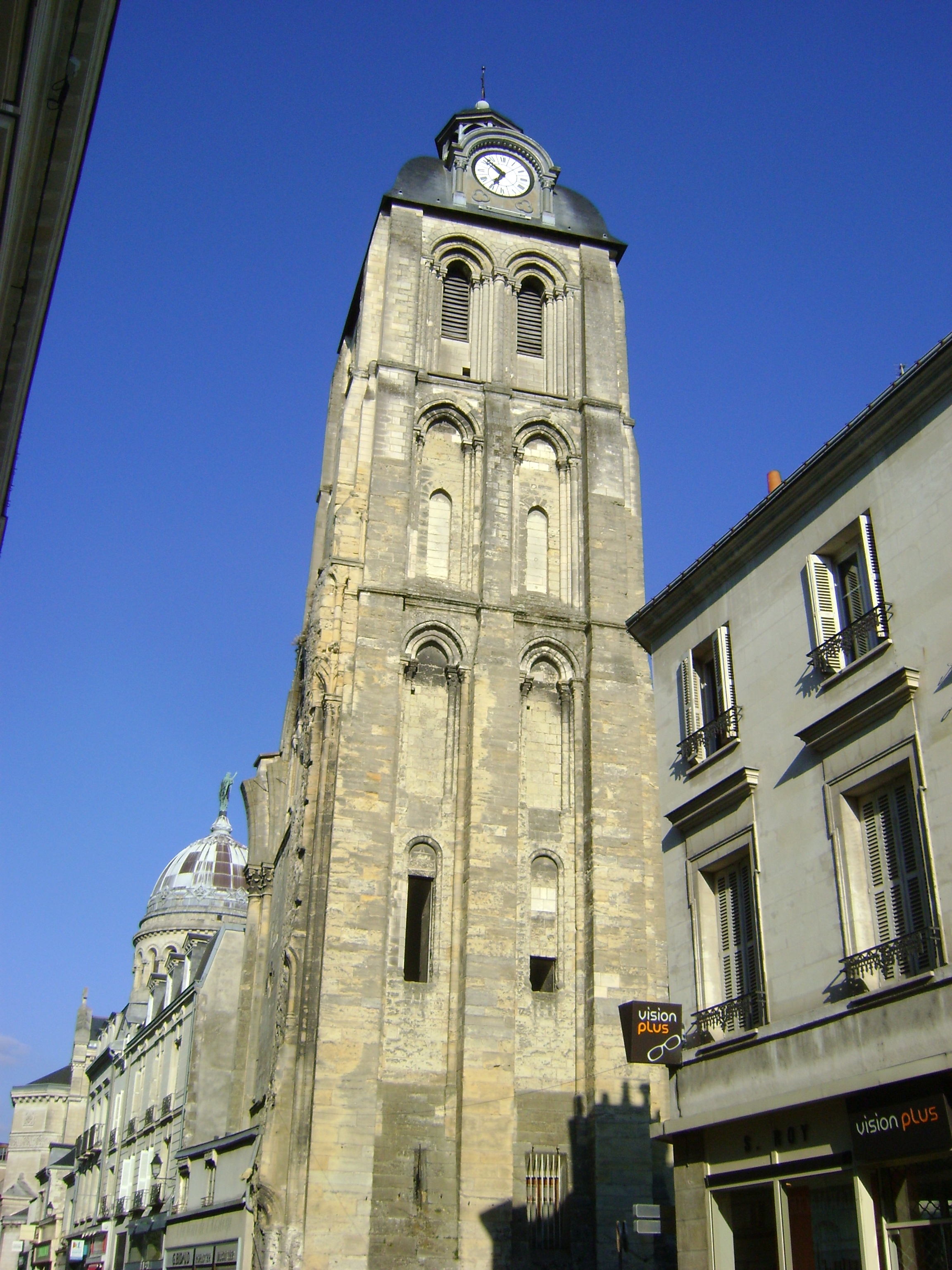
Clock Tower

- Year 1790: on 13 April 1790, the basilica was declared national property.
- Year 1794:
  - on 8 February, basilica spires were dismantled, including those crowning the Charlemagne Tower and the Clock Tower;
  - on 21 March, the basilica was converted into a stable to house horses.
- Year 1796:
  - in February, a large portion of the roof's lead and vaults' metal reinforcements was stolen;
  - on 2 November, the vaults of the ambulatory collapsed, weakened by the loss of reinforcements combined with water seepage caused by a defective roofing.
- Year 1797: on 5 November, decision was made to demolish the basilica, due to the risk to the surroundings of a whole crash of the temple. To that end, authorities auctioned the ensemble in lots.
- Year 1803: on 15 September, the demolition was complete.

Only 3 structures survived the operations:

- the Clock Tower, which now displayed a city clock, which mechanism stands inside the dome;
- a small section of the basilica cloister;
- the Charlemagne Tower, thanks to a restoration project (which eventually never happened) aiming to celebrate Napoleon's crowning as a French emperor (2 December 1804).

New streets were laid out after the razing: the Rue Pommereul (todays Rue des Halles) cut through along the axis of the ancient nave, and Rue Descartes ran along the old southern arm of the transept.

=== Post-revolution period ===
Rubbles from the tower collapse, 1928

After tearing down the Basilica of Saint-Martin, the southern side of the tower lost the structural support provided by the transept. The building also suffered additional mishaps:

- it was used as a shot tower to produce lead balls (1813);
- a carpentry workshop was set up on the ground floor and later caught fire (1826);
- an 107 metres (351 ft)-deep artesian well was drilled at its base (1831);
- a water tower had been operating from the first floor (1860–1885), increasing the structure weight by 218 tonnes (481,000 lb);
- it withstood an earthquake (1927);
- the city trams passed by in the street and triggered regular shaking (1920s).

Weakened, the Charlemagne Tower partially collapsed in 1928: on the eve of the 26 March, the southern side partly crumbled down into the surrounding streets without causing any casualties. The section still standing was quickly shored up with scaffolding to prevent any further damage.

=== Tower rehabilitation ===
Saint Martin sharing his cloak with a beggar, by Georges Muguet

Luitgarde Vault

In 1931, the association Les Amis de la tour Charlemagne (English: Friends of the Charlemagne Tower) purchased the monument for 100 francs. It soon started several remedial actions: laying an internal concrete framework on the remaining section to reinforce the structure and clearing away the rubble. These moves revealed the layout of the transept foundations, part of the Romanesque basilica's apse and highly ornate column capitals from the original basilica transept. All these elements had been incorporated into the masonry during the tower's construction and the subsequent modifications.

During World War II, the tower was fortunate to be spared from bombing raids and fires that devastated the northern part of Tours between 19 and 22 June 1940. Restoration works were completely halted during the war. After the conflict, the association Les Amis de la tour Charlemagne lacked funds and had to slow down the pace of restoration.

Driven by the département council, works finally resumed in 1962 and ended two years later: the project was carried out as part of the overall rehabilitation of the nearby Vieux-Tours (English: Old Town) district. The tower's base was coated in concrete clad, while the exterior was covered with large-format ashlar masonry which restored the building early appearance prior to its collapse. Bernard Vitry (1907–1984), the Historical Monuments architect in charge, completed the reconstruction of the collapsed upper section in a contemporary style, using rubble masonry, without any openings. On the top floor of the southern façade was placed a terracotta sculpture of Saint Martin sharing his cloak with a beggar, by Georges Muguet (1903-1988).

The area surrounding the tower was cleared by razing the abutting edifices. The process uncovered the foundations of the Romanesque Basilica which are made open for public since then. In 1972, the Charlemagne Tower was handed over to the city of Tours.

Later improvements have allowed public access to the Luitgarde Vault on the ground floor (in 2012), to the first floor (in 2013) and to the entirety of the tower, including the roof top, since 2016.

== Characteristics ==
Details of buttresses

Foundations of the Romanesque Basilica

The Charlemagne Tower has a rectangular footprint, approximately 25 metres (82 ft) by 15 metres (49 ft). In its current state (after restoration), it is 48 metres (157 ft) tall.

The tower features Romanesque architecture style on its lower levels and Gothic architecture style on its highest level.

The first two floors can be accessed via a spiral staircase housed in a turret, located outside the transept, near the tower's northwest corner. Access to the top level is provided by an internal spiral staircase built through the floor structure.

The exterior walls feature massive applied buttresses, extending up to the level of the second-floor deck.

The tower's southern façade, which was thoroughly rebuilt (1962-1964), has no openings from the second level upwards.

The edifice used to house Romanesque frescoes from the 12^{th} century. Some fragments were discovered during restoration work on pillars, in particular in the small apse converted into a sacristy. These frescoes have been detached and restored: they are now exhibited in the Saint-Martin Museum in Tours, located in the remaining buildings of the basilica cloister.

Due to successive layers of filling that piled up during centuries around the basilica, the original ground level of the Charlemagne Tower now sits approximately 2 metres (6.6 ft) below the level of the surrounding streets.

== Gallery ==
Capitals from the ancient transept

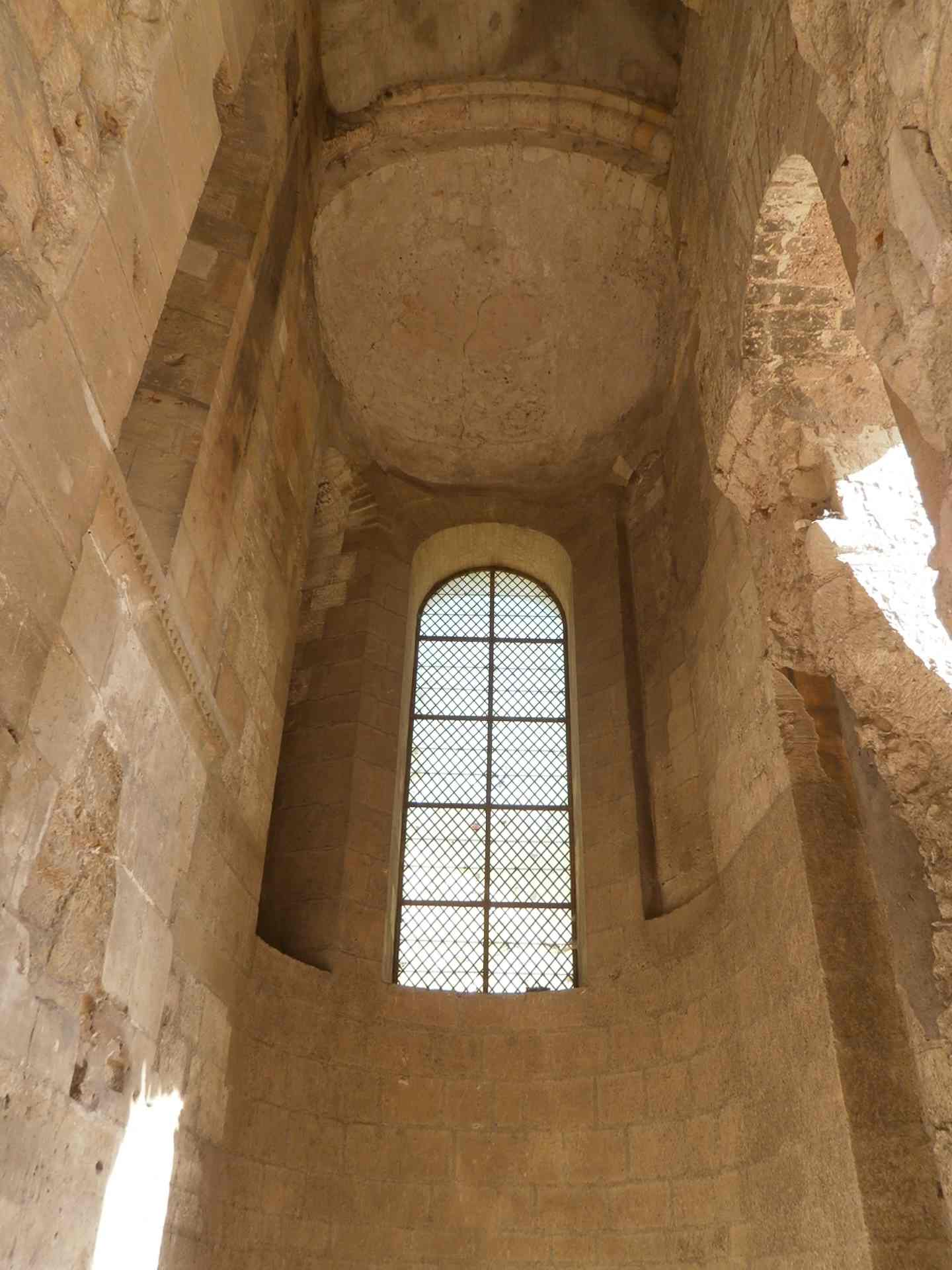
External apsidiole of the ancient arm, incorporated into the tower as a sacristy

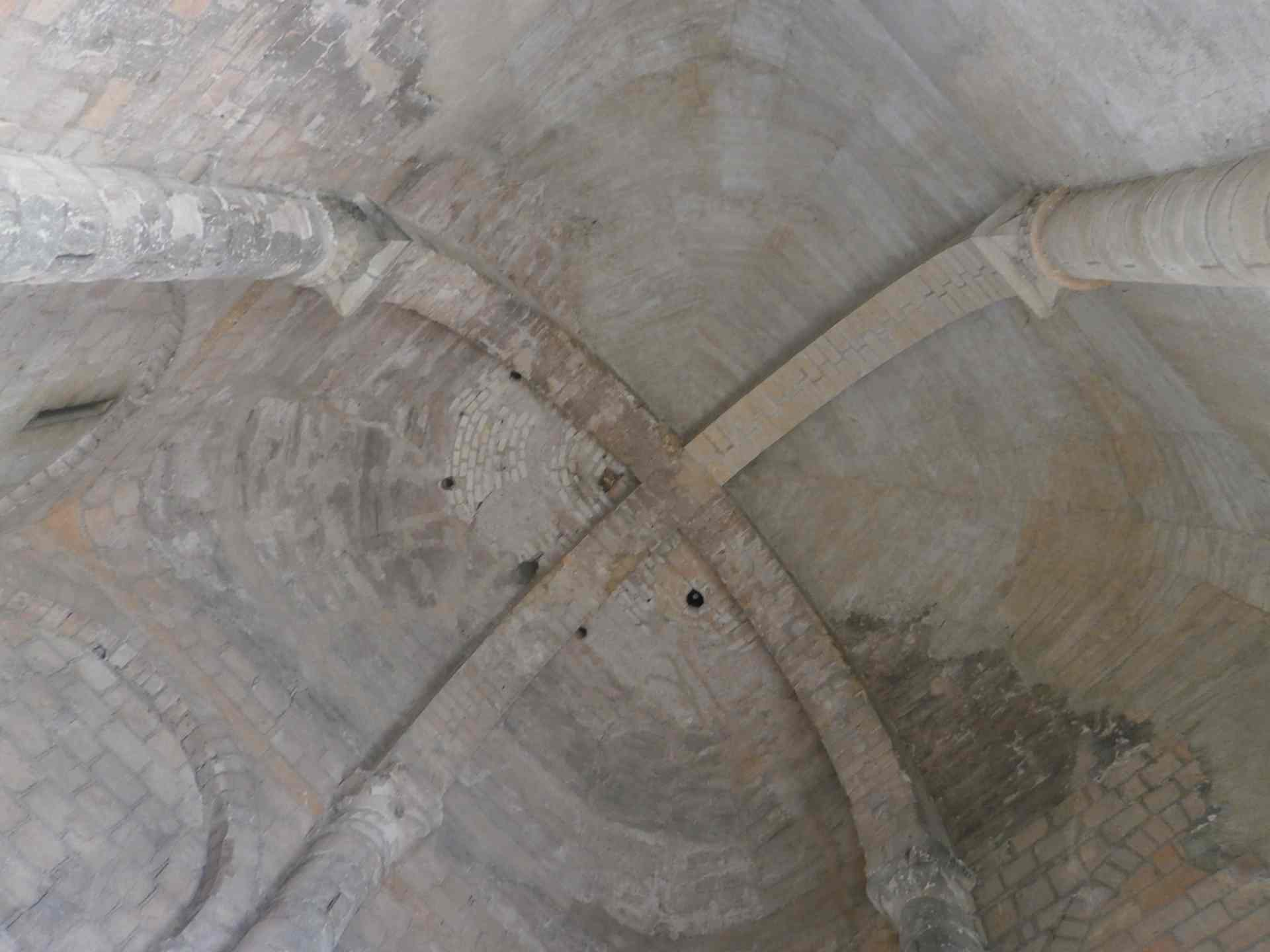
Romanesque vault, first floor

Gothic vaults, second floor, with the internal spiral staircase to the roof top

Second floor, Gothic vaults (left) and reinforced structure (right)

Landing of the staircase to the roof

The Charlemagne Tower with the modern Basilica

== See also ==
- Tours
- Basilica of Saint Martin, Tours
- Tour de l'Horloge (Tours, France)
- Basilica
- Charlemagne (disambiguation)

== External link ==
- (in French) Tours City Heritage site

== Bibliography ==
- (in French) Lelong, Charles (1987). La Basilique Saint-Martin de Tours, Bulletin Monumental, tome 145, n°2 [Basilica of Saint Martin of Tours, Bulletin Monumental, Volume 145, No. 2] (in French). Paris: Société française d'archéologie. ISBN 2-85443-122-7.
- (in French) Ranjard, Robert (1949). La Touraine archéologique : guide du touriste en Indre-et-Loire [Archaeological Touraine: A Tourist's Guide to Indre-et-Loire] (in French). Mayenne: Imprimerie de la Manutention. ISBN 2-85554-017-8.
- (in French) Wettstein, Janine (1978). La fresque romane [The Romanesque Fresco] (in French). Genève: Librairie Droz. ISBN 2-600-04610-0.
- (in French) Bray, A. (1931). La Tour Charlemagne [The Charlemagne Tower] (in French). Tours: MAME.
- (in French) Sauzet, Robert (1986). Histoire de Tours, sous la direction de Bernard Chevalier. Annales de Bretagne et des pays de l'Ouest. Tome 93, numéro 2 [History of Tours, edited by Bernard Chevalier. Annals of Brittany and Western France. Volume 93, No. 2] (in French). Toulouse: Privat. ISBN 2-7089-8224-9.
