= Holy Trinity Cathedral, Dnipro =

Eastern Orthodox church in Dnipro, Ukraine

Holy Trinity Cathedral
- Church of the Descent of the Holy Spirit
- Свято-Троїцький собор Церква Зішестя Святого Духа
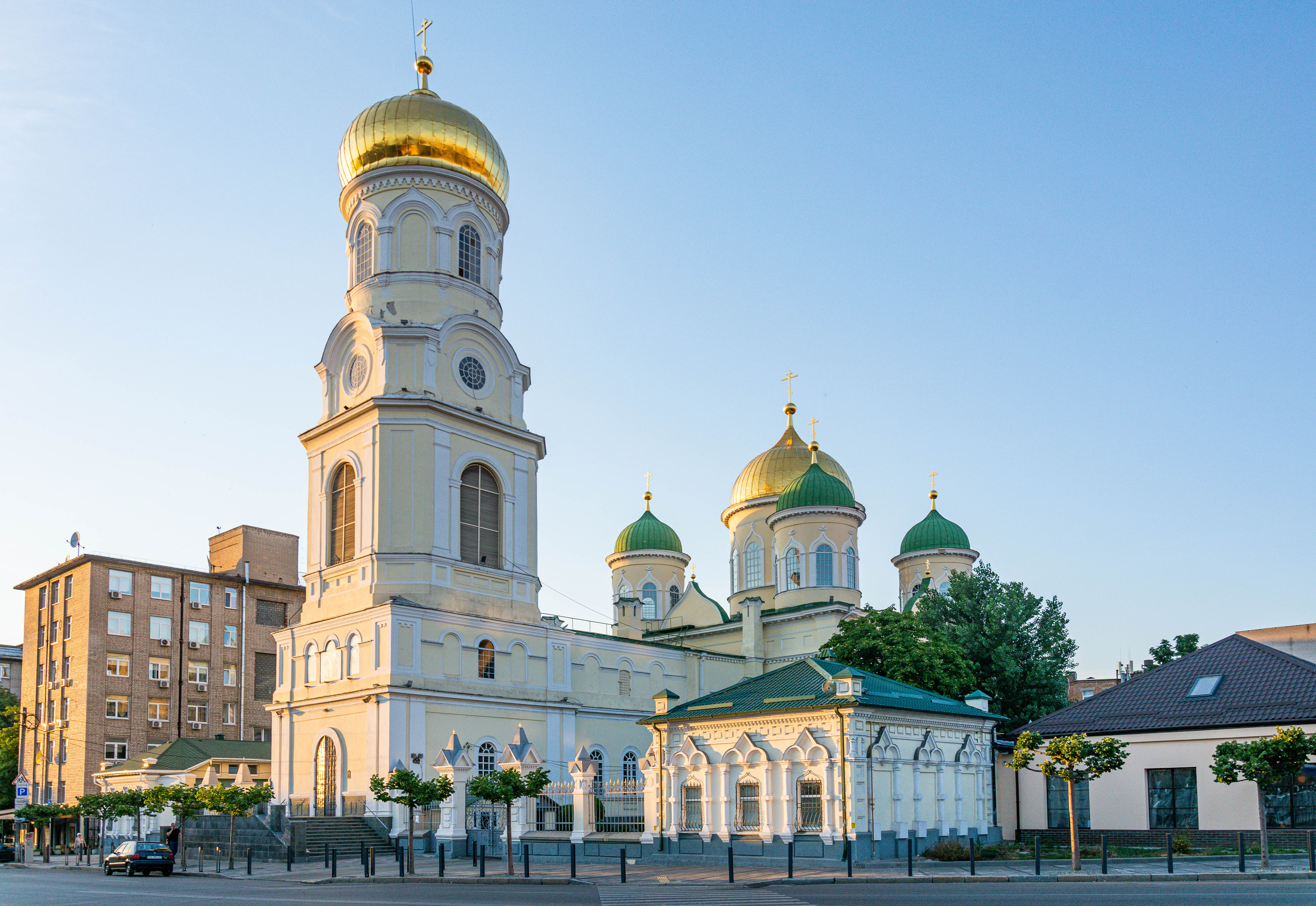
- The cathedral in 2020
- Holy Trinity Cathedral
- 48°27′47″N 35°02′44″E
- Location: Dnipro
- Address: 7 Troitska Square
- Country: Ukraine
- Denomination: Eastern Orthodoxy
- Website: Official website

History
- Former names: Church of the Descent of the Holy Spirit; Trinity Church
- Status: Active
- Founded: 1775–1778
- Dedication: Our Lady of Kazan
- Consecrated: 1837

Architecture
- Functional status: Metropolitan cathedral
- Architect(s): Ludwig Charlemagne; Peter Visconti
- Architectural type: Cathedral
- Style: Classical architecture and Russian-Byzantine architecture
- Groundbreaking: 1845
- Completed: 19th century

Administration
- Archdiocese: Ukrainian Orthodox Church

The Holy Trinity Cathedral (Ukrainian: Свято-Троїцький собор, romanized: Sviato-Troitskyi sobor) or the Church of the Descent of the Holy Spirit, is a 19th-century Eastern Orthodoxy cathedral of the Ukrainian Orthodox Church (UOC) in Dnipro, Ukraine. Ludwig Charlemagne-Bode and Peter Visconti designed and erected the church. It was known as the Church of the Descent of the Holy Spirit or Trinity Church during most of the 1800s. The cathedral has since become one of the city's historical landmarks.

== Design ==
The cathedral is home to several shrines, including the icons of the Holy Trinity. Additionally, there are two crosses that contain fragments of the remains of saints who are honored in Orthodoxy. The iconostasis from the Kazan Cathedral and the tomb from the St. Nicholas Bryansk Cathedral are two of the relics. The cathedral is surrounded by trees and greenery. Another notable feature of the Holy Trinity Cathedral is that, in 1909, new icons and paintings were painted by the renowned Ukrainian painter Ivan Yizhakevych, who specialized in folk art and Ukrainian folklore.

== History ==
Cossacks spent three years building the first church in Novomoskovsk, from 1775 to 1778. To avoid polluting the sacred site, they made the decision to construct a wooden shrine devoid of any nails. Back then, the church was a stone home with Russian-Byzantine architectural details. In commemoration of the Our Lady of Kazan, the church was erected on the location of the original city church. Forty years after its consecration on 15 January 1791, the small wooden church began to crumble, prompting the city's merchants to embark on a new building, east of the Svyatodukhivska Church.

The city's merchants looked to Peter Visconti and Ludwig Charlemagne-Bode, architects from Saint Petersburg. The church was known as the Church of the Descent of the Holy Spirit or Trinity Church during most of the 1800s. The church building was dedicated in 1837. The bell tower, which at the time was Katerynoslav's highest building, was first constructed in 1862. The new temple functioned as both a parish school and a city church. The bell tower and its structures were joined around the end of the 1800s. Subsequently, the church parish school and the clergy homes were constructed.

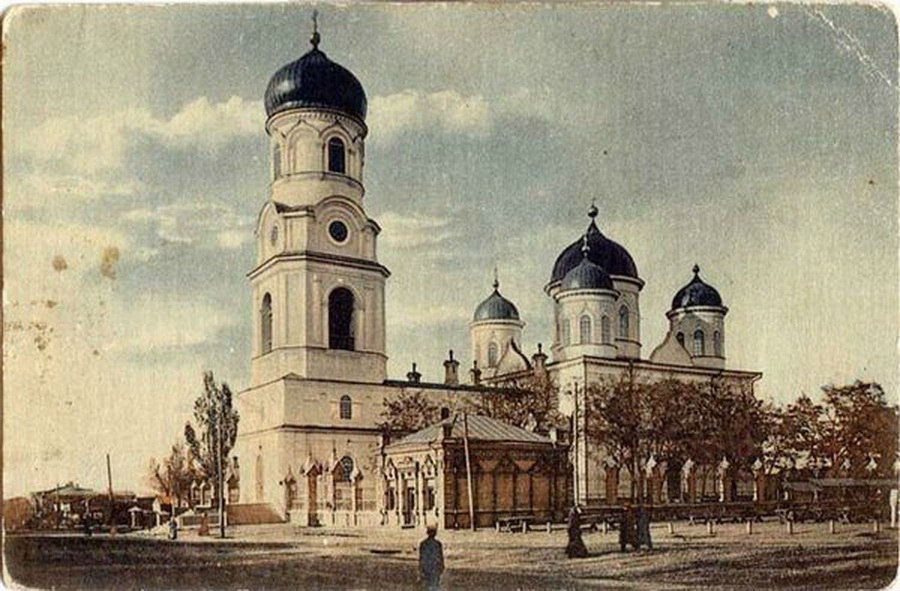
Trinity Church in the early 20th century

Following the 1917 revolution, the diocesan bishop's department relocated to the cathedral following the closure of Transfiguration Cathedral. However, it was likewise shut down in 1934 due to the absence of parishioners. The crumbling church sprang back to life when Germany occupied it. The archbishop's throne and worship were reinstalled in it in November 1941. The Dnipropetrovsk Diocese's presiding bishop's office has been housed under the Holy Trinity Cathedral's vaults ever since.

The church was shut down in the 1930s as part of the Soviet Union's campaign against religion, then it served as a warehouse. Since the German occupation of the city in 1941, the cathedral began its first divine services in 1941. Clergy, cathedral rectors, diocesan bishops, and locals killed in 1941 during the Dnipropetrovsk bombing are interred on the cathedral grounds, alongside a mass grave next to the cathedral. The renovation of the church officially starts in 1944.

Bishop Irenae has been a source of energy, dedication, and fervent support for the restoration effort that began in 1956 and has since gained personal attention. The exterior and internal decorations of the Trinity Cathedral, as well as the neighboring cathedral, have been restored thanks to the efforts of the rector, Archpriest Vladimir Aksyutin.

Another noteworthy event in the cathedral's history occurred in 1960 when the renowned confessor and confessor Archimandrite Seraphim (Tyapochokin), who started his pastoral career in the Dnipropetrovsk Oblast in 1920, returned to the cathedral after being exiled. The cathedral building is completely rebuilt, and restoration work on the temple starts in the 1990s.

On 16 April 2023 there was a picket outside the cathedral. Protesters requested signatures on a petition to outlaw the denomination's operations in the city and in Ukraine. They also attempted to alert parishioners of the UOC's pro-Russian leanings. The priest made an effort to speak with the action's participants despite not introducing himself, and questioned the campaigners.

Notable individuals have been drawn to the cathedral. Here, the academician Dmytro Yavornytsky gathered objects for his scientific research and the Dmytro Yavornytsky National Historical Museum of Dnipro. The cathedral took center stage in Oles Honchar's book of the same name.

== Gallery ==
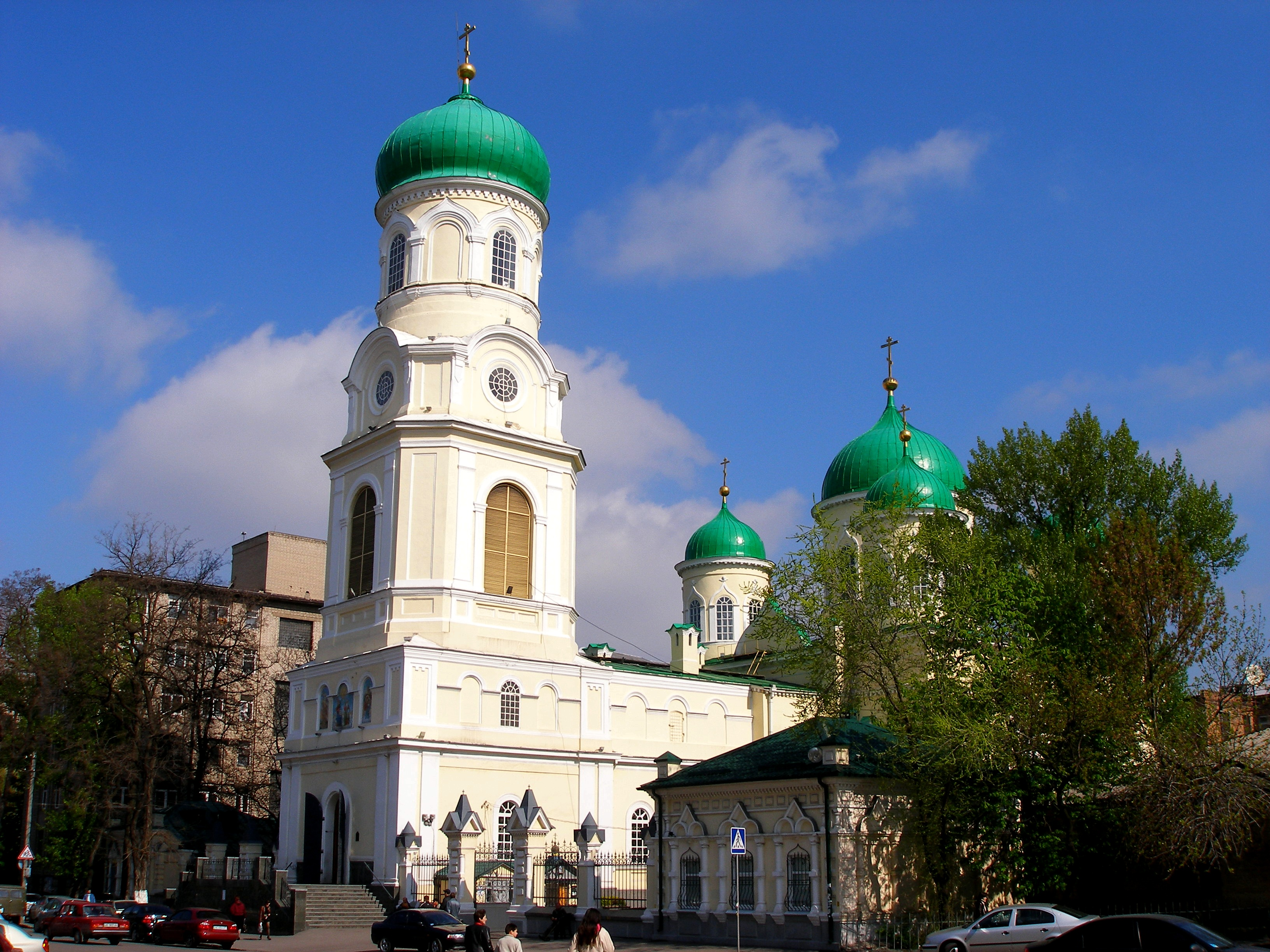
The cathedral's bell tower

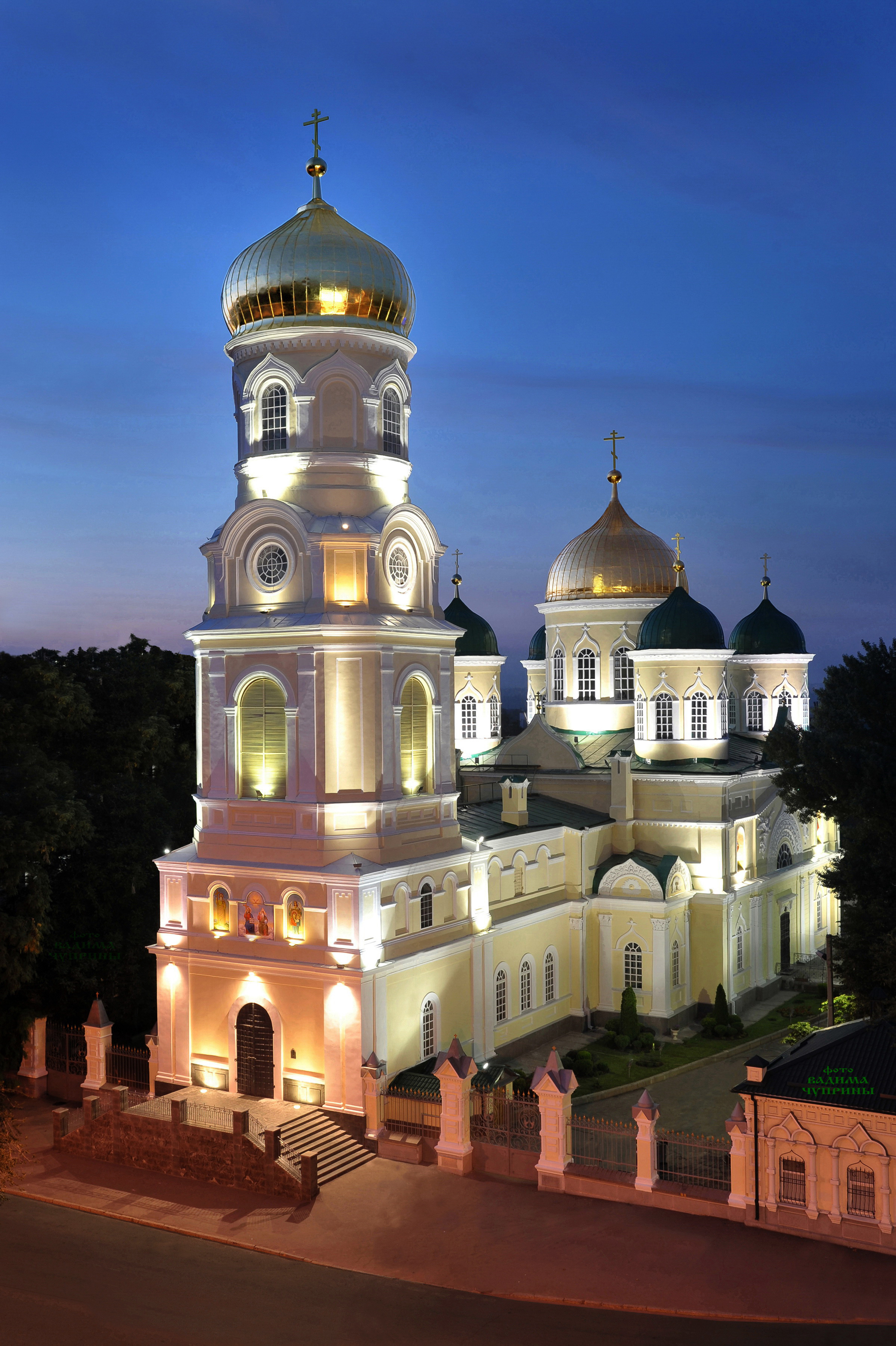
The cathedral at night

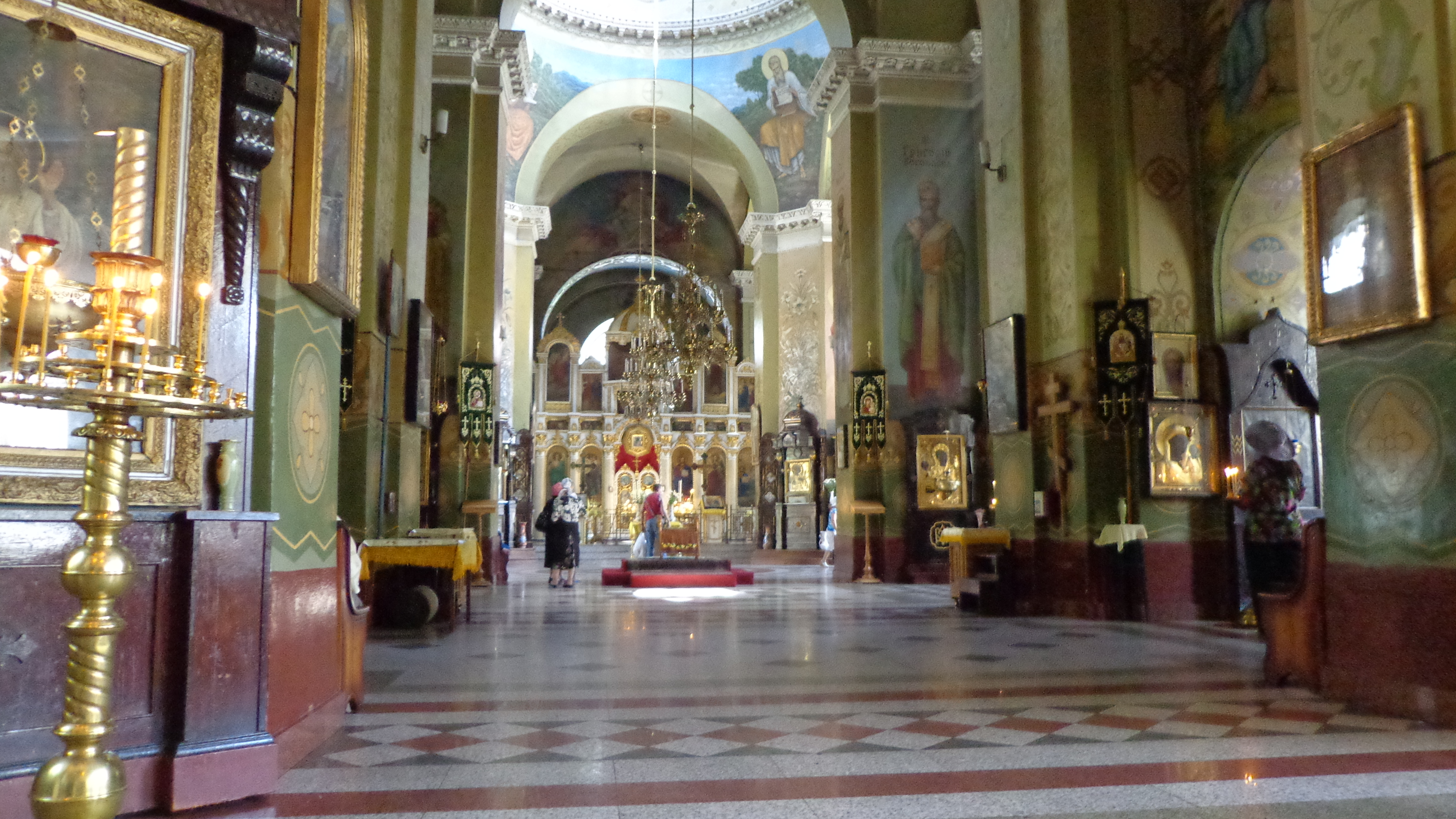
Interior of the cathedral

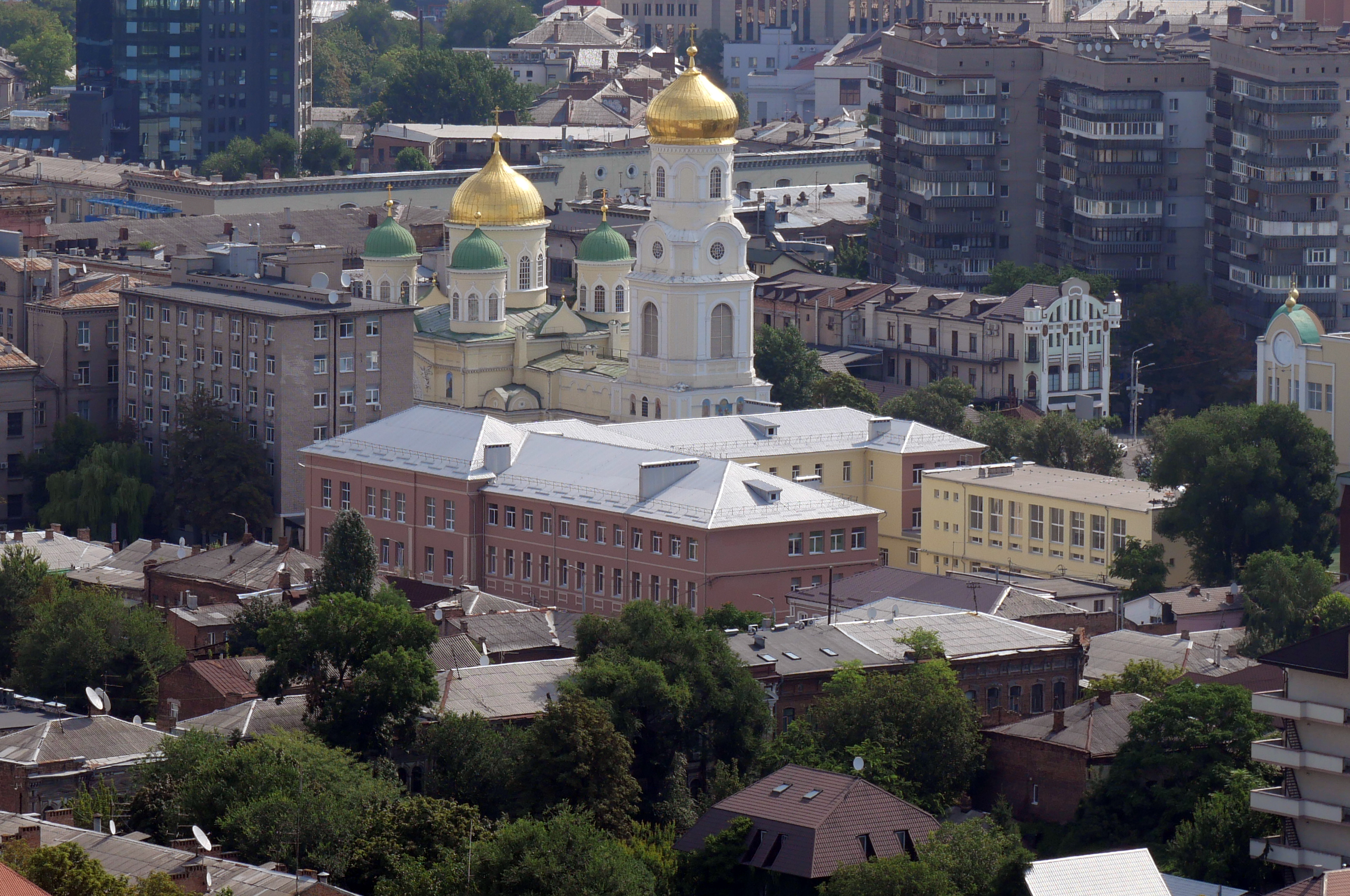
The cathedral seen from above
