= Tour de l'Horloge (Tours, France) =

Clock tower in Tours, France

Clock Tower
- Tour de l'Horloge
- Tour de l'Horloge, Tours, in November 2025
- Interactive map of the Clock Tower area

General information
- Type: Clock tower
- Architectural style: Romanesque architecture
- Location: 86 rue des Halles, 37000, Tours, France
- Coordinates: 47°23′34.3″N 0°40′54.5″E
- Construction started: 11^{th} century

Height
- Height: 50 metres (160 ft)

Technical details
- Floor count: 3

The Clock Tower is, alongside the Charlemagne Tower, a remnant of the former basilica dedicated to Saint Martin of Tours. It is located in the Old Town district of Tours, France, at 86 rue des Halles.

The tower had been registered on the French national heritage list in 1840.

During the French Revolution, a clock has been set up on the top. Since this period, its initial name, Treasury Tower (French: Tour du Trésor), was changed to Clock Tower (French: Tour de l'Horloge).

== History ==
=== Construction stages and modifications ===
In 1003, Hervé de Buzançais, then canon and treasurer of the Basilica of Saint Martin, decided to rebuild the early 5^{th} century sacred building which had fallen into disrepair. The project to erect a large Romanesque basilica on the site of the tomb of Saint Martin of Tours was complete in 1014: the edifice was consecrated on 4 July, the day celebrating Saint Martin's election as the Bishop of Tours (in 371).

Following the blueprint of the Basilica of Saint-Sernin in Toulouse consecrated a few years earlier, the church originally featured three towers: two on the façade and one above the transept.

The current tower (i.e Treasury Tower) was the southern tower of the basilica's façade, built at the same time as the original façade, in the early 11^{th} century. Its name is linked to the ground-floor room that housed the basilica's treasury: a windowless space devoid of any ornamentation, well-suited to an assigned role of safe room. Towards the end of the same century (1175-1180), as part of a comprehensive overhaul of the church, the façade was entirely redesigned and the Treasury Tower was given a Gothic style, leaving Romanesque elements of interiors untouched. Additionally, these works comprised the erection of a tower at each tip of the transept.

A century later, following several fires, the ensemble including the nave, the facade and its towers were re-constructed in the Gothic style. Around the mid-13^{th} century, the choir was enlarged.

In 1562, the basilica was looted by the Huguenots during the French Wars of Religion. During the 17th^{th} century, the edifice only underwent minor alterations; its shape was kept unchanged till the French Revolution.

=== Impact of the French Revolution ===
- Year 1790: on 13 April, the basilica was declared national property. It lost its pyramidal spire with truncated edges.
- Year 1794:
  - in February, the roof spire was demolished;
  - on 21 March, the building was turned into a stable house.
- Year 1795: the tower top was covered by a dome surmounted by a roof lantern. The structure received the bell of the former Church of Saint-Saturnin, demolished in 1798. The bell used to signal the opening and closing of the city markets.
- Year 1796:
  - in February, a large portion of the roof's lead and vaults' metal reinforcements was stolen;
  - on 2 November, the vaults collapsed, weakened by the loss of reinforcements combined with water seepage caused by a defective roofing.
- Year 1797: on 5 November, decision was made to demolish the basilica, due to the risk to the surroundings of a whole crash of the temple. To that end, authorities auctioned the ensemble in lots.
- Year 1803: on 15 September, the demolition was complete.

Only 3 structures survived the operations:

- the Charlemagne Tower, thanks to a restoration project (which eventually never happened) aiming to celebrate Napoleon's crowning as a French emperor (2 December 1804).
- the Treasury/Clock Tower, which now displayed a city clock, which mechanism stands inside the dome;
- a small section of the basilica cloister.

New streets were laid out after the razing: the Rue Pommereul (todays Rue des Halles) cut through along the axis of the ancient nave, and Rue Descartes ran along the old southern arm of the transept.

== Characteristics ==
The tower has a square footprint, 10 metres (33 ft) by 10 metres (33 ft). It is approximately 50 metres (160 ft) tall.

The only access to the tower is via its eastern face, which was originally the basilica's south side aisle entrance. The passage leads into the Treasury room itself from where one can climb up a spiral staircase inside the tower, attached to the eastern façade, giving access to the two upper floors.

The first floor is roofed by a Romanesque vault. It is illuminated by round-arched windows on the western and southern faces; these openings initially looked onto the exteriors of the basilica.

The second floor displays one of the oldest rib vault in Touraine.

The western and southern facades of the tower exhibit ancient buttresses, still rising up to the top in some places.

At the tower's northwest and northeast corners, one can still notice the attachments of the arches that connected the Romanesque façade and the nave in the former basilica. The capitals supporting them are also visible. These elements originated from the reconstruction works carried out in the late 12^{th} century.

The second level facade displays an arcade supported by small columns. One od ftehm, made of black marble, was initially part of the 5^{th} century basilica.

== Gallery ==
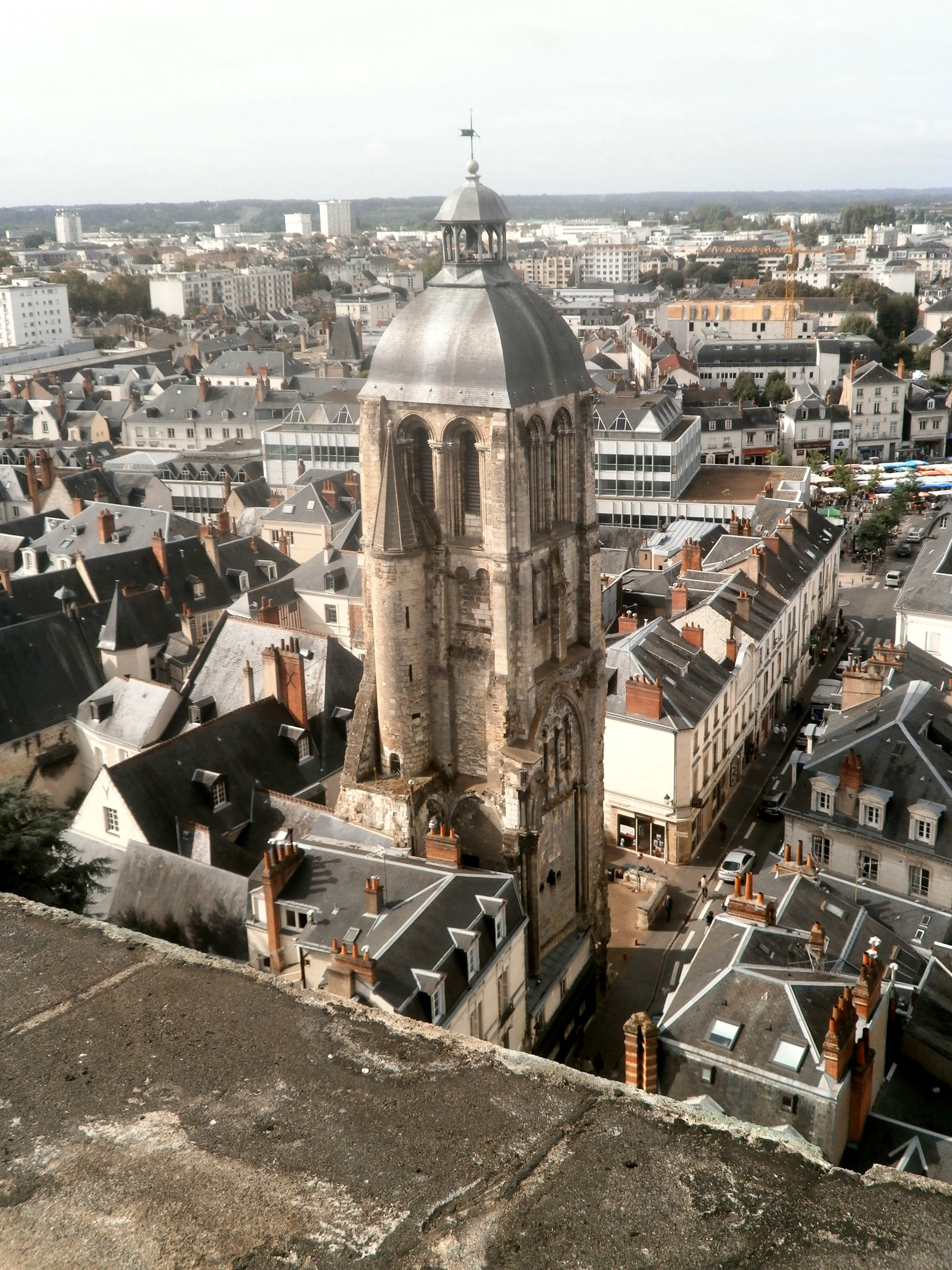
View of the clock tower from the dome of Saint Martin Basilica

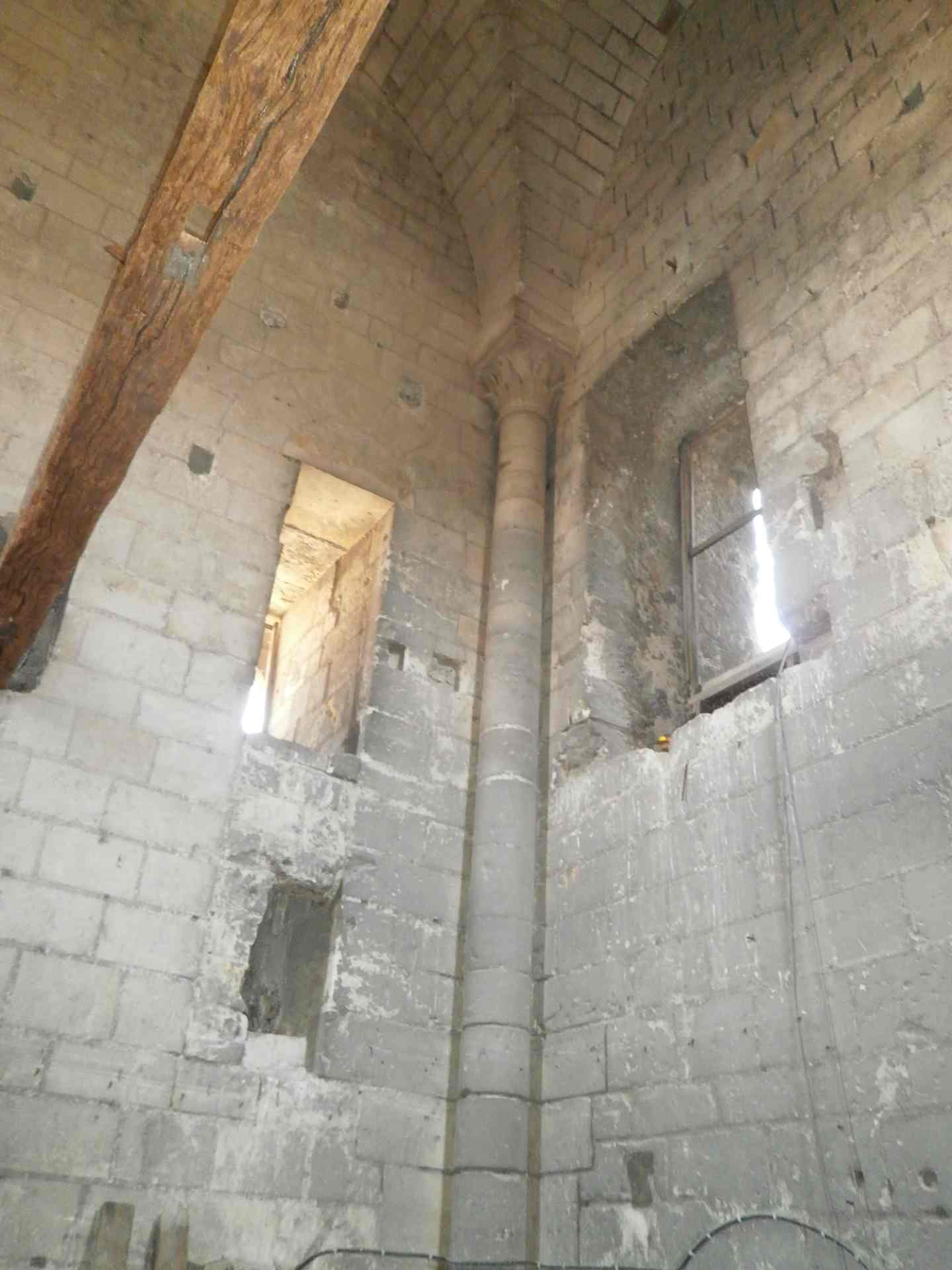
First level vaulted roof

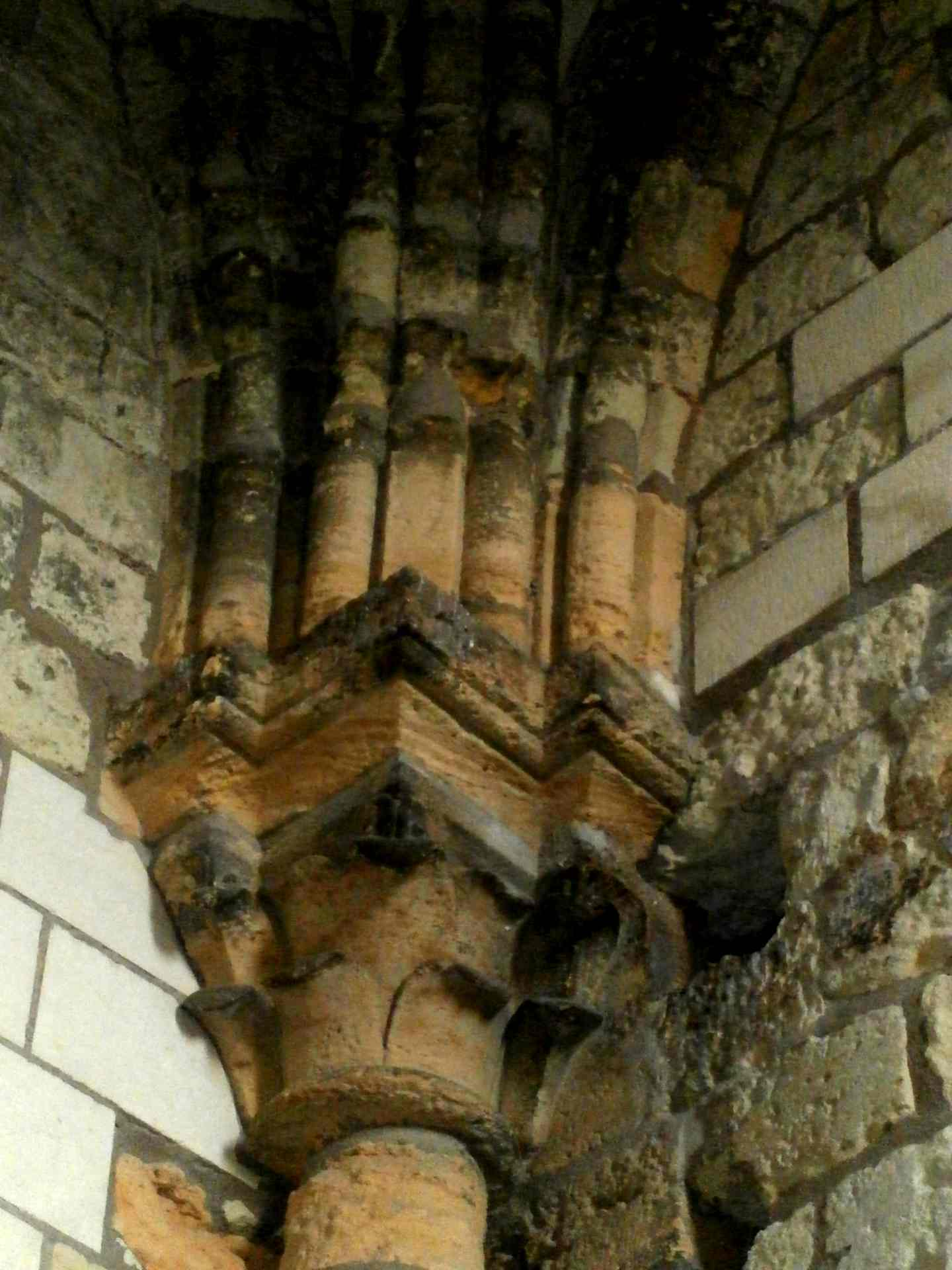
Second level capital vaults

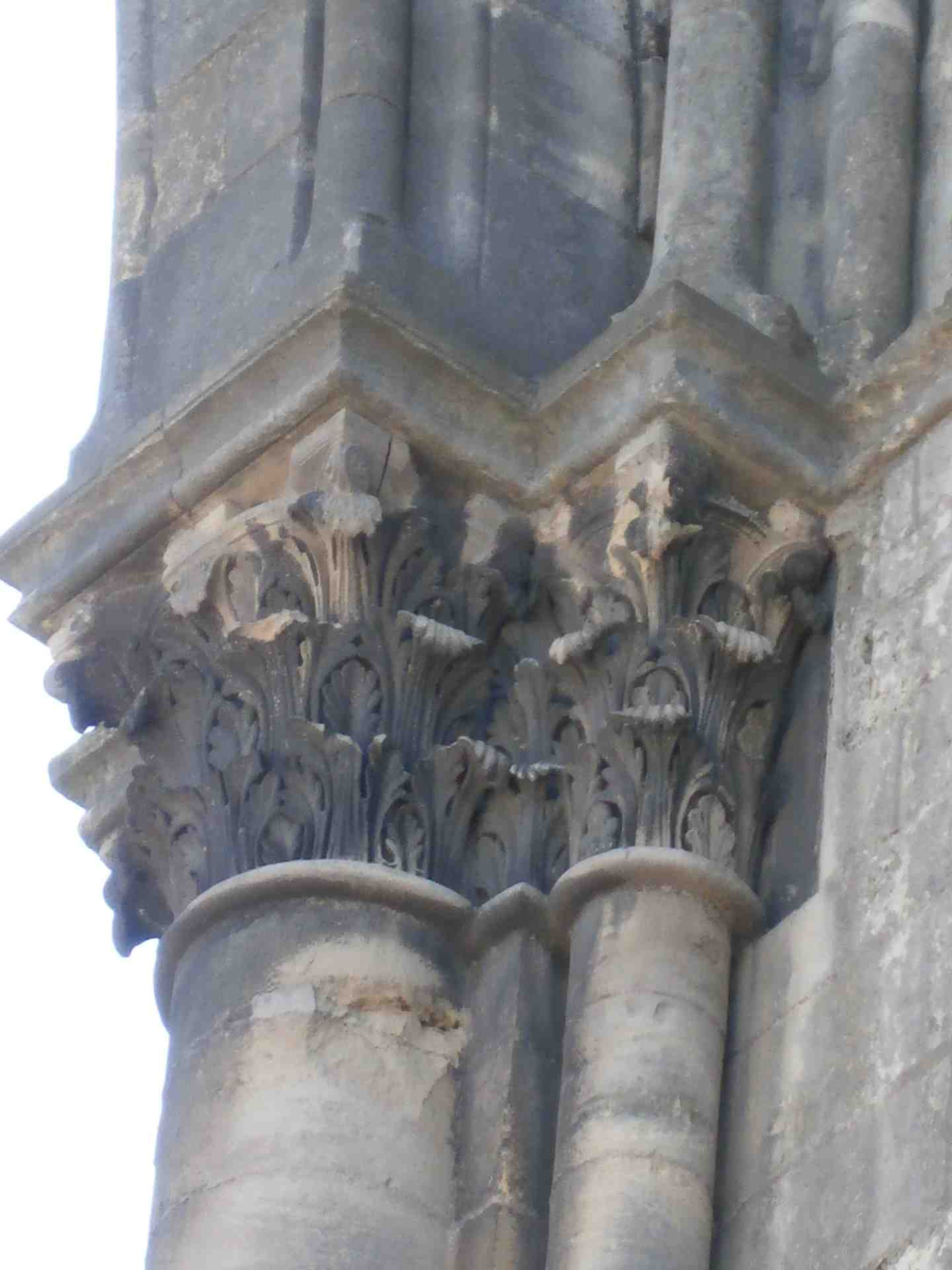
Capitals supporting the former Basilica entry portal

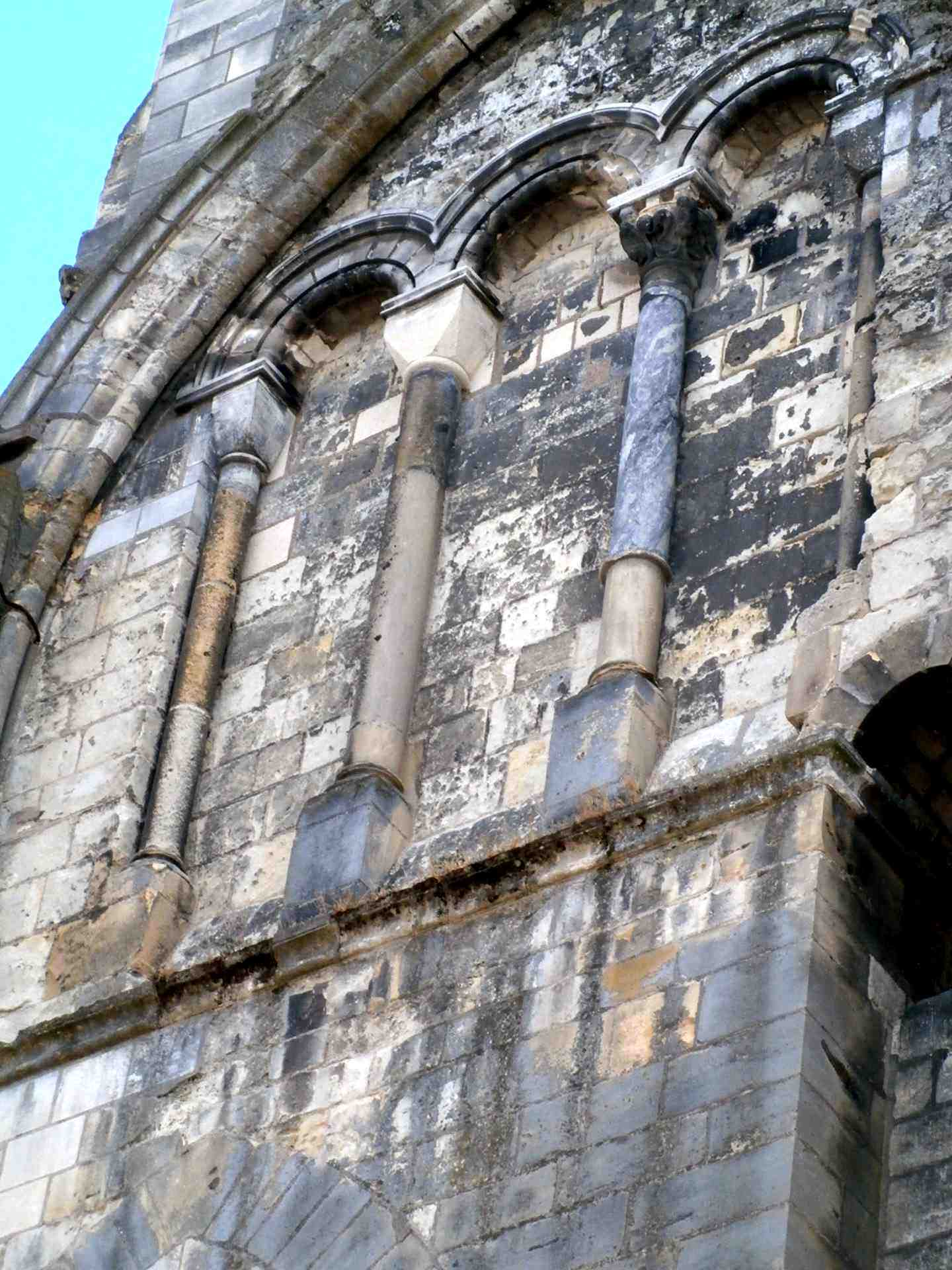
Small columns supporting a gone arcade

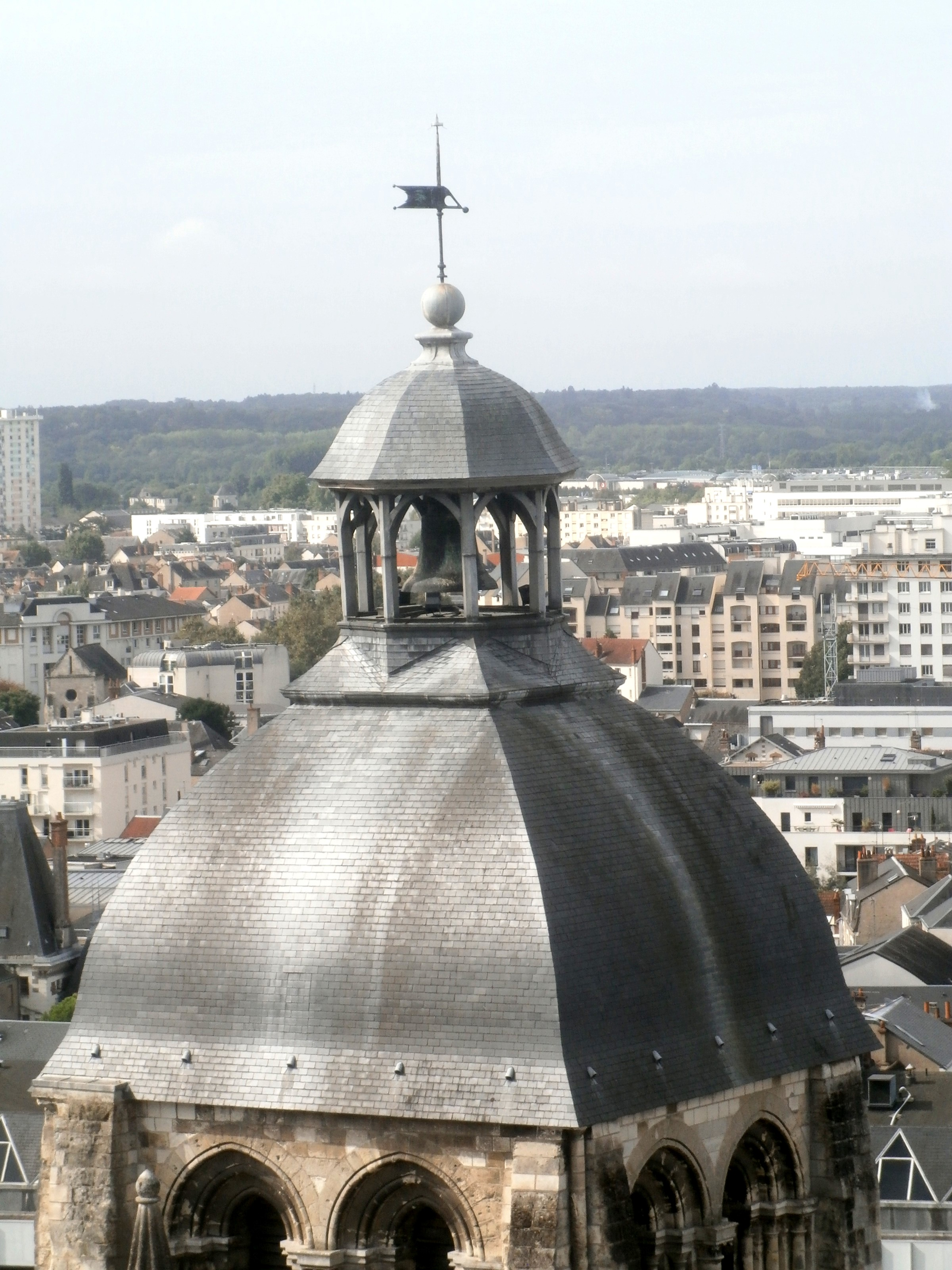
Roof lantern

View of the clock tower top

== See also ==
- Tours
- Basilica of Saint Martin, Tours
- Charlemagne Tower, Tours
- Basilica

== Bibliography ==
- (in French) Lelong, Charles (1987). La Basilique Saint-Martin de Tours, Bulletin Monumental, tome 145, n°2, année 1987 [Basilica of Saint Martin of Tours, Bulletin Monumental, Volume 145, No. 2] (in French). Paris: Société française d'archéologie. ISBN 2-85443-122-7.
- (in French) Ranjard, Robert (1949). La Touraine archéologique : guide du touriste en Indre-et-Loire [Archaeological Touraine: A Tourist's Guide to Indre-et-Loire] (in French). Mayenne: Imprimerie de la Manutention. ISBN 2-85554-017-8.
