= Adolf Charlemagne =

Russian painter

Adolf Iosifovich Charlemagne
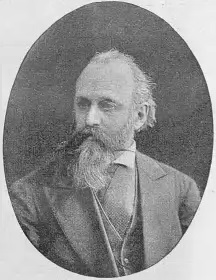
- Born: December 8, 1826; Saint Petersburg
- Died: January 31, 1901 (aged 74); Saint Petersburg
- Education: Member Academy of Arts (1859); Professor by rank (1867)
- Alma mater: Imperial Academy of Arts
- Awards: Big Gold Medal of the Imperial Academy of Arts (1855)

Adolf Iosifovich Charlemagne, or Sharleman (Russian: Адольф Иосифович Шарлемань; 8 December 1826, Saint Petersburg – 31 January 1901, Saint Petersburg) was a Russian painter of historical, genre and battle scenes. He was also the creator of a popular design for playing cards known as the "Satin Deck".

== Biography ==
His father was the architect, Iosif Ivanovich Charlemagne. His grandfather, the sculptor and decorative artist, Jean Baptiste Charlemagne-Baudet, was originally from Rouen and had come to Russia to work for Catherine the Great. His brother, Iosif, also became an artist and architect.

He received his primary education at Saint Peter's School, then enrolled at the Imperial Academy of Arts, where he studied history painting with Fyodor Bruni and battle painting with Bogdan Willewalde. While there, he was awarded several silver and gold medals.

The last of these awards, in 1855, carried with it a stipend to study abroad. He went to Munich, where he studied with Alexander Kotzebue, another battle painter. In 1859, he was named an "Academician" for his portrayals of Alexander Suvorov in the Swiss Alps. He then went to Paris and studied the paintings at Versailles. He returned to Saint Petersburg by way of Germany in 1861.

His first paintings after returning were for the Page Corps, followed by ceiling murals at the Meshchersky family mansion in Moscow. In 1867, his portrayal of Catherine the Great in the workshop of Étienne Maurice Falconet earned him the title of Professor. It was acquired by Empress Maria Alexandrovna. For the next twenty years, he worked prolifically to supply the demand for his images; many of which became illustrations in magazines. From 1871, he worked for the Federal State Unitary Enterprise, designing securities, bonds and other negotiables.

== Selected paintings ==
Field Marshal Suvorov in Gotthard Pass

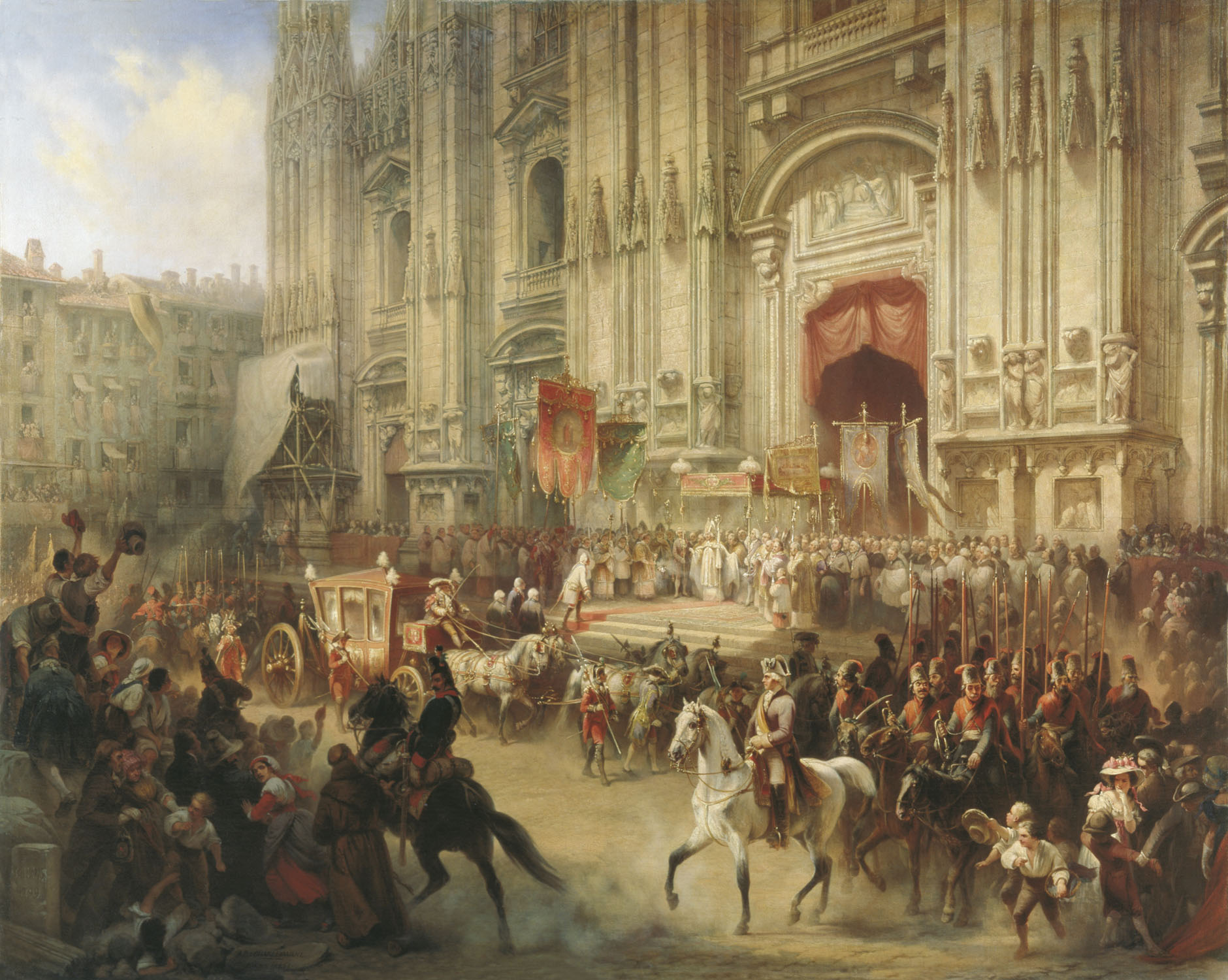
Marshal Suvorov in Milan

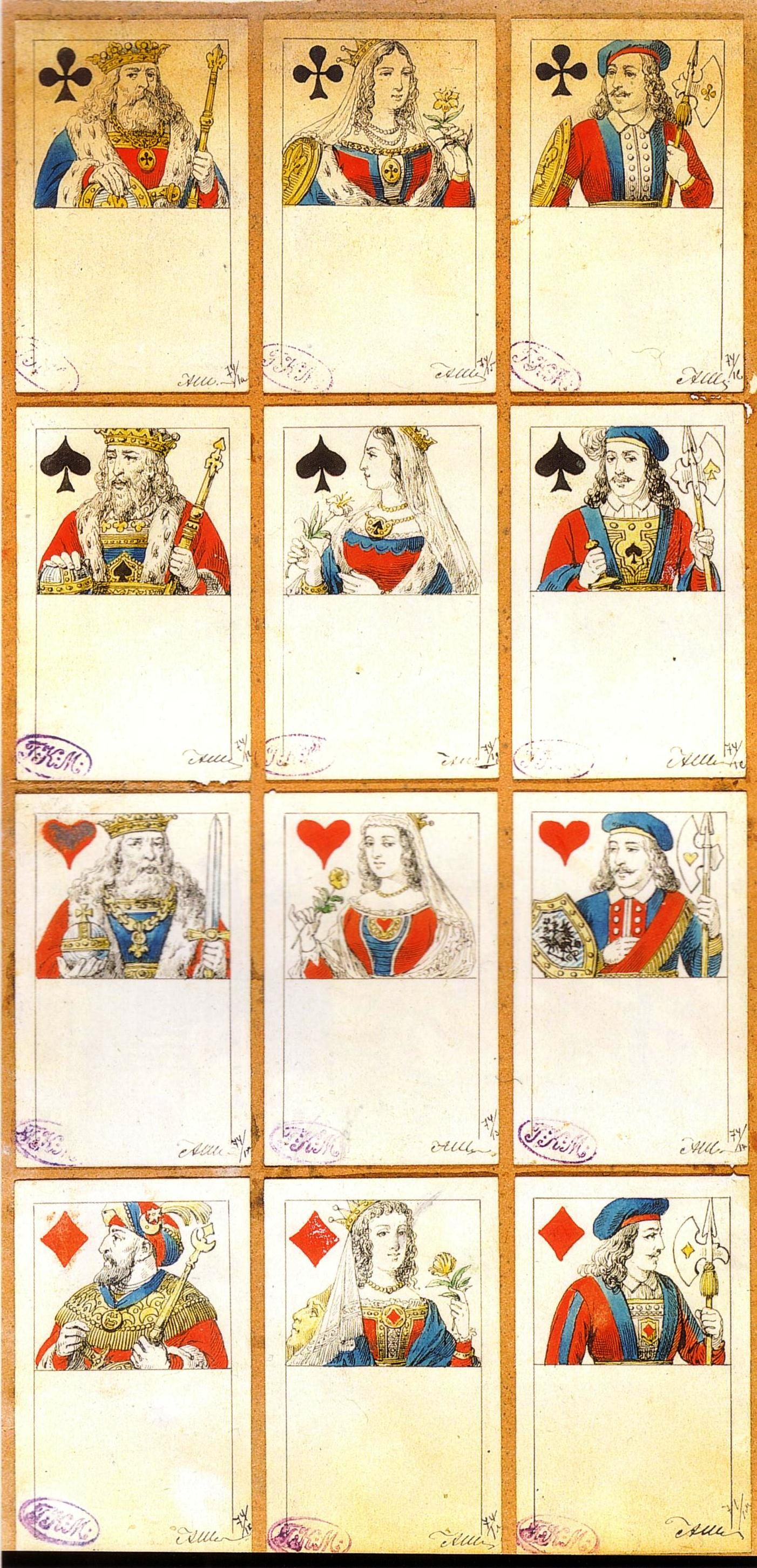
Russian playing card deck designed by Adolf Charlemagne

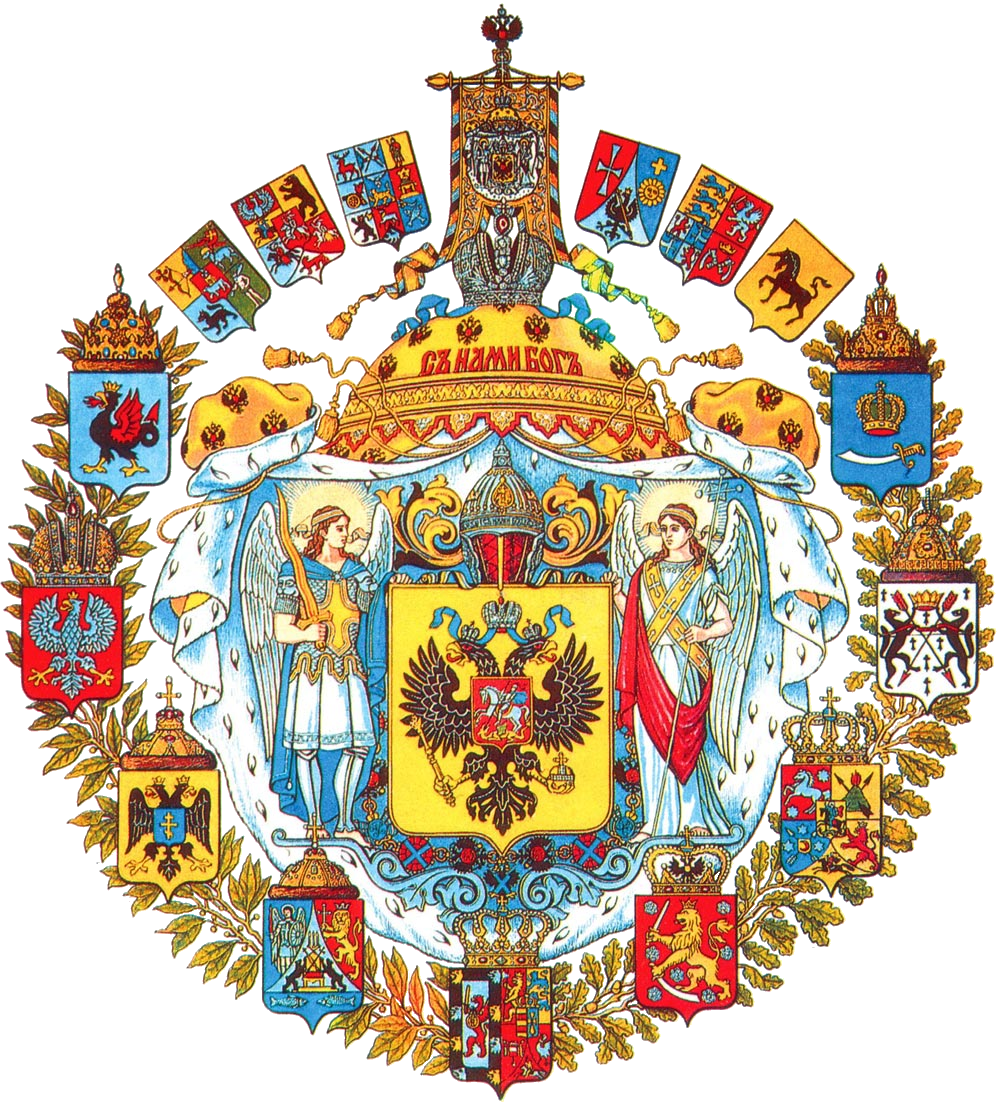
Greater coat of arms of the Russian empire

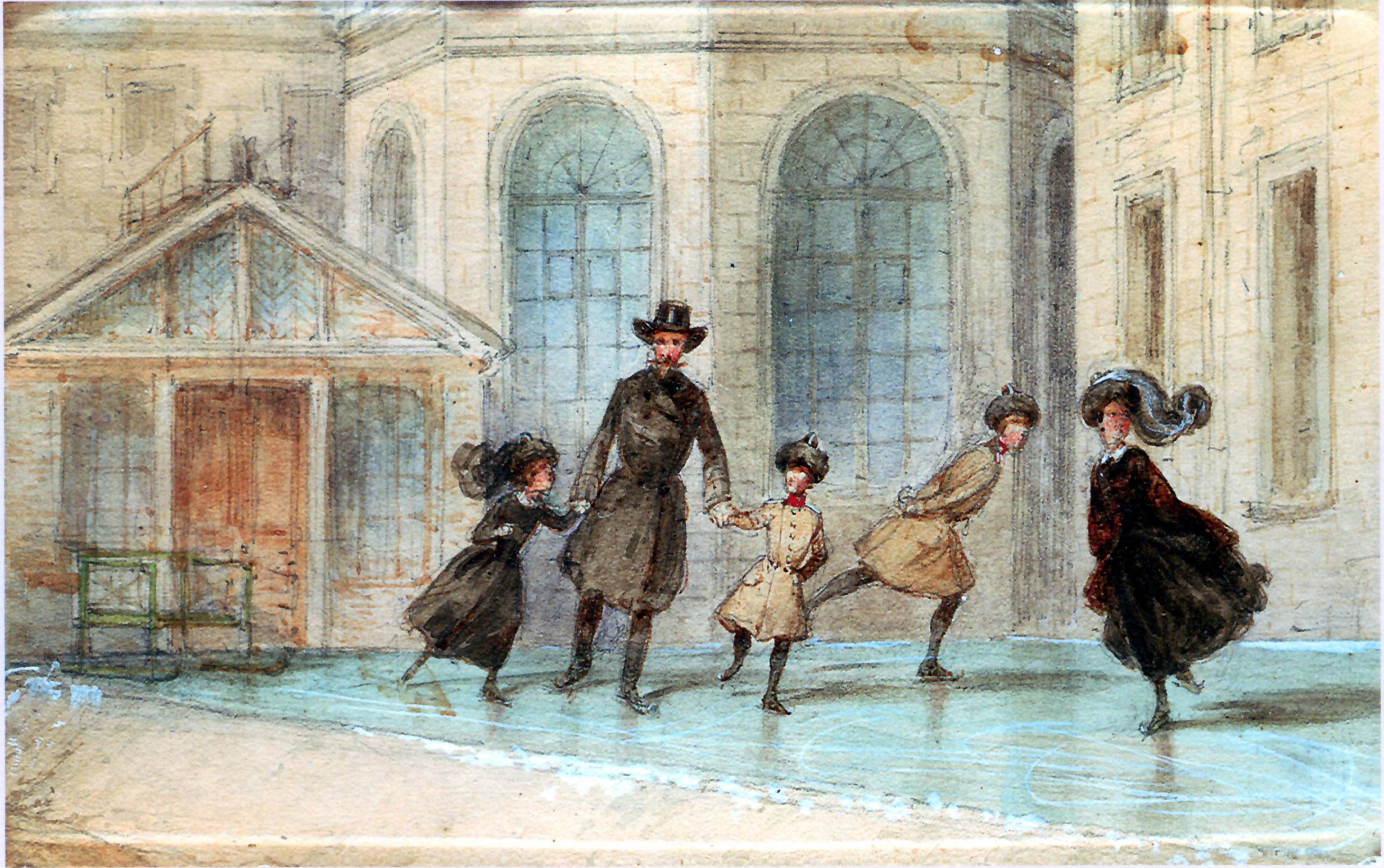
Children skating

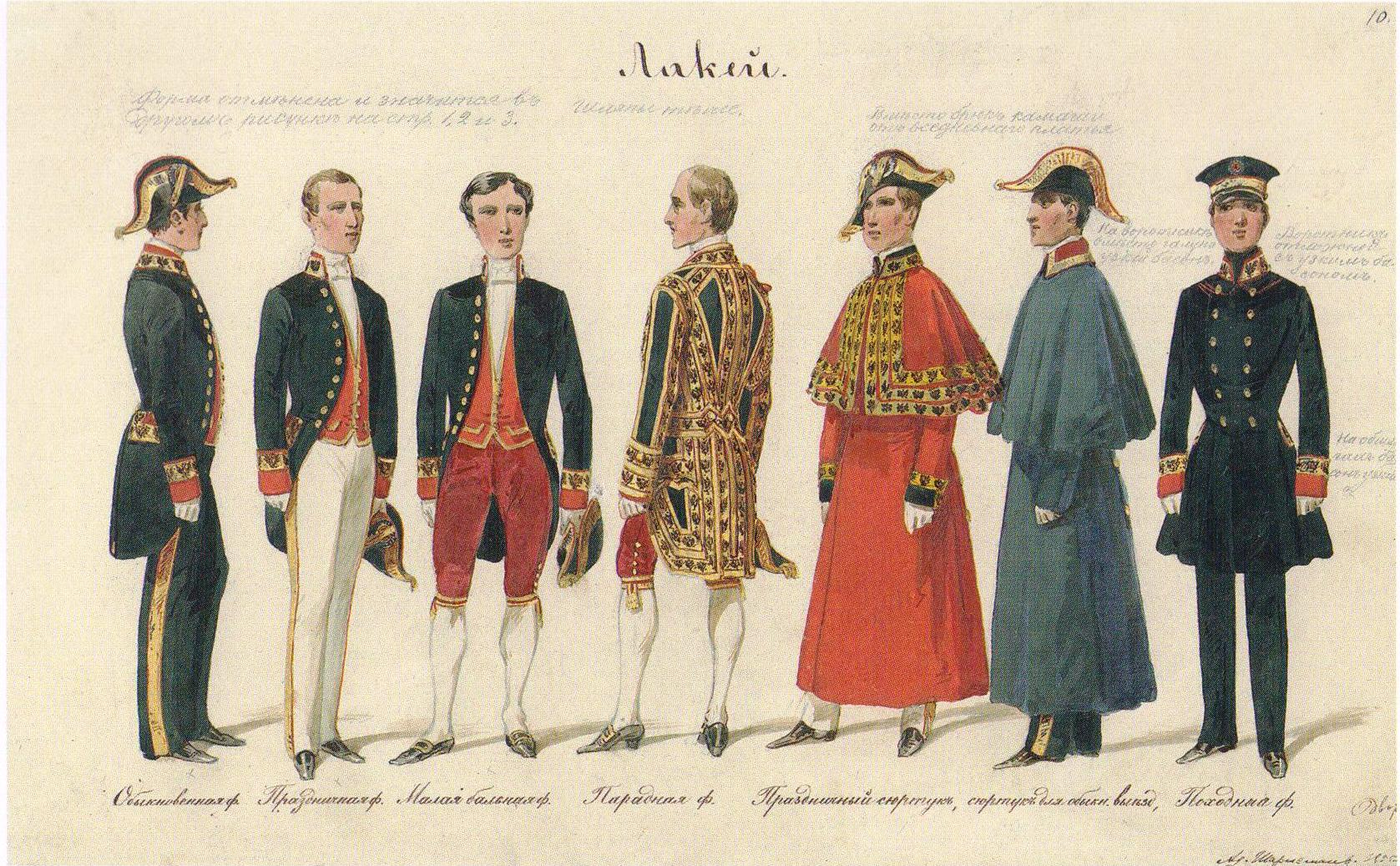
Lackeys
