= Renouard =

Renouard is a surname. Notable people with the surname include:

- Antoine-Augustin Renouard (1765–1853), French industrialist and bibliographer
- Flavie Renouard (born 2000), French steeplechase runner
- George Cecil Renouard (1780–1867), English classical and oriental scholar
- Jean-Jacques Renouard de Villayer (1607–1691), French official
- Jean-Pierre Renouard (1922–2014), French writer
- Maël Renouard (1833–1910), French financier
- Maël Renouard (born 1979), French writer and translator
- Philippe Renouard (1862–1934), French bookseller and bibliographer
- Sébastien Renouard (born 1984), French football player
