= Russian playing cards =

Card deck

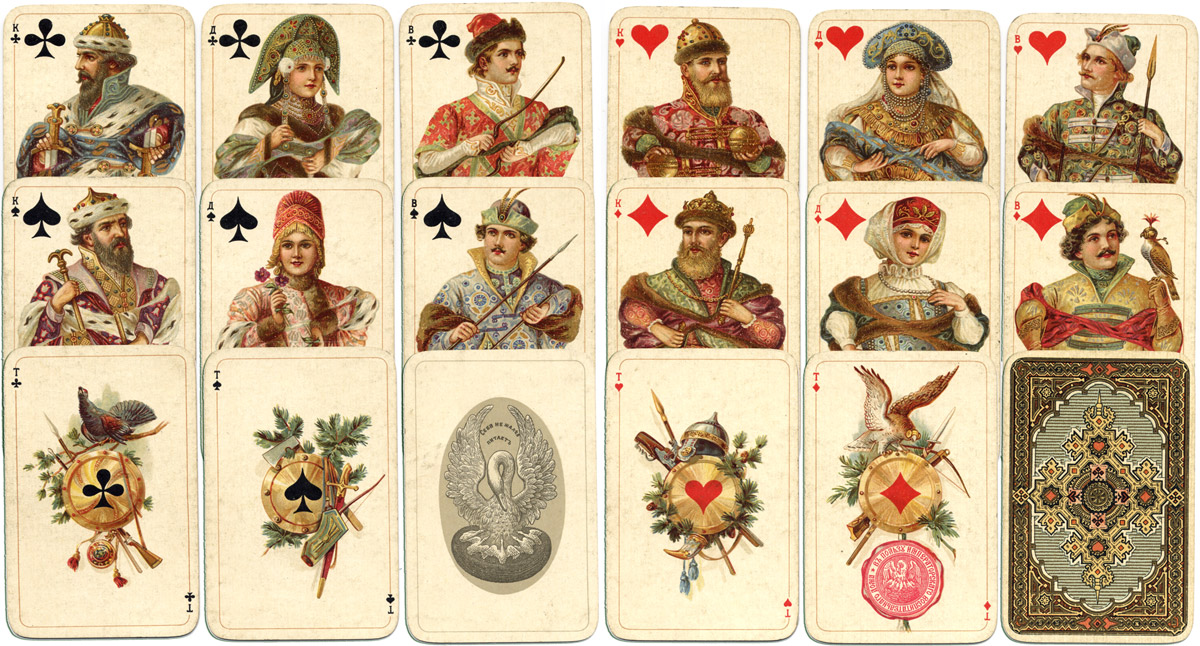
Russian playing card deck (face cards), 1911

Russian playing cards are cards that were used predominantly in Russia and in the former Soviet Union. Most Russian card games employ either 36-card packs (e.g. Durak) or 32-card packs (especially Preferans).

== History ==
Playing cards were first introduced into Russia at the beginning of the 17th century from Western and Central Europe (supposedly from Germany and Poland). But they were soon banned: in 1649, Sobornoye Ulozheniye mentioned card games as one of the "thief's crimes" punished by lashing, though from the time of Peter the Great the ban was usually ignored. In spite of many attempts by the Russian government to restrict card games, many Russians, especially the Russian nobility, played cards on a significant scale during the 18th century.

Before the 19th century, practically all playing cards were imported from Western and Central Europe, and from 1765 all imported cards had to be stamped and high import duty paid, which was intended to limit card gaming. However, in 1819, the restrictions were lifted, but at the same time the import of playing cards was also forbidden and a state monopoly was created. The production of own Russian playing cards started in the Imperial Card Factory of the Imperial Paper Mill in Aleksandrovo (now a part of Saint-Petersburg).

== Design ==
Russian playing card deck (face cards) designed by Adolf Charlemagne

The design of the Russian card decks was derived and influenced by the German card decks as well as the French card decks. Russian cards in the market were divided into three or four categories, depending on the quality of paper and printing: from cheapest decks for laymen through medium quality decks for the Russian middle class to high class decks for the imperial court and the higher nobility. In 1862 the renowned Russian painter Adolf Charlemagne (Russian: Адольф Шарлемань) created a new unified design. Very soon his design became the most widespread and recognizable and it is still widely produced and used in Russia. Apart from that nearly fifty card designs were devised by various Russian artists during the 18th–20th centuries.

=== "Russian style" ===
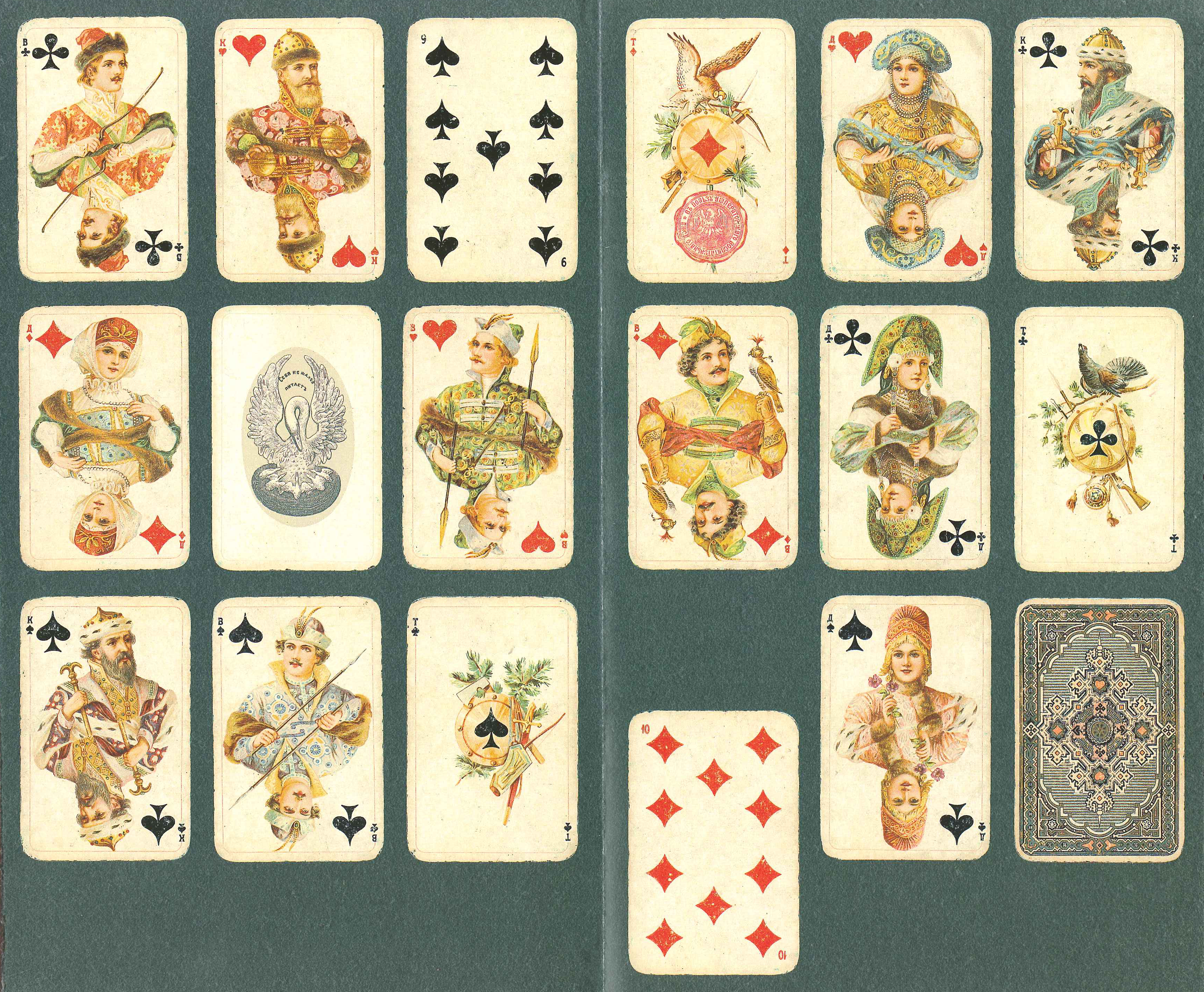
"Russian style" card deck

The end of the 19th and the beginning of 20th knew the rising interest to the old pre-Petrine Russian traditions (see also Russian Revival architecture), this fashion was even more intensified due to the 300th anniversary of the house of Romanovs in 1913. As a result, in 1911 the particular card design in the "Russian style" (Russian: колода «Русский стиль») was created. The costumes of the face cards imitated the historical 17th century Russian costumes of the famous 1903 Ball in the Winter Palace.

== Deck ==
Thanks to German influence, a standard Russian pack contains only 36 cards from 6 to the Ace. For some games, particularly Preferans, the 6s are omitted, resulting in a 32 card pack. Nevertheless, 52 card packs also occur.

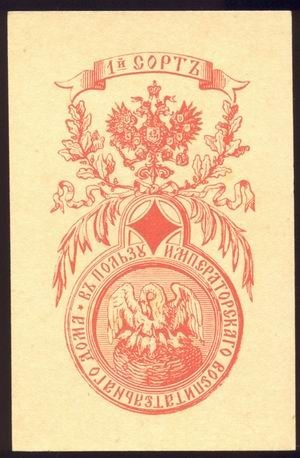
Ace of Diamond with the Imperial coat of arms

The design of the pip (numerical) cards as well as the suits (♣, ♦, ♥, ♠) resemble those of French playing cards. The design of the face cards is either that of Adolf Charlemagne or in the "Russian style". The design of the aces are variable, historically the ace of diamonds showed the coat of arms of the Russian Empire (in the most popular satin deck, the ace of diamonds is usually the only decorated one, corresponding to the ace of spades in English decks, and in the other decks all the aces are usually decorated in some extent). The face cards and the aces are marked by the Russian letters that correspond to the Russian rank names:

- T (туз, tuz from German: Daus "deuce" via Polish: tuz) for Ace
- К (король, korol', "king") for King
- Д (дама, dama from German: Dame or French: Dame) for Queen
- В (валет, valet from French: valet) for Jack

The names for the pip cards are derived from Russian numerals: двойка, тройка, четвёрка, пятёрка, шестёрка, семёрка, восьмёрка, девятка, десятка (dvoika, troïka, chetvyorka, pyatyorka, shestyorka, semyorka, vos'myorka, devyatka, desyatka) for 2, 3, 4, 5, 6, 7, 8, 9, 10 respectively.

== In Russian culture ==
The popularity of card games in Russia was portrayed by some famous Russian writers, particularly Alexandre Pushkin who wrote The Queen of Spades.

Because the 6 is the lowest card of the Russian deck, Russian slang uses the derogatory word shestyorka meaning "underling, lackey".
