= Jean Armand Charlemagne =

Jean Armand Charlemagne (born Bourget (Seine) 30 November 1753 – died Paris 6 March 1838) was a French dramatic author.

Originally intended for the church, he turned first to being a lawyers clerk and then a soldier. He served in the American War of Independence, and on returning to France (1783) began to employ his pen on economic subjects, and later in writing for the stage. He became the author of a large number of plays, poems and romances, among which may be mentioned the comedies M. de Crac à Paris (1793), Le Souper des Jacobins (1795)and L'Agioteur (1796), and Observations de quelques patriotes sur la nécessité de conserver les monuments de la littérature et des arts (1794), an essay written in collaboration with MM. Chardin and Renouard, which induced the convention to protect books adorned with the coats of arms of their former owners and other treasures from destruction at the hands of the revolutionists.
