= Maël Renouard =

French writer and translator (born 1979)

- Born: 1979 (age 46–47); Paris
- Occupations: Writer, Translator
- Title: chevalier of the Ordre des Arts et Lettres

Maël Renouard (born 1979 in Paris) is a French writer and translator.

== Biography ==
A former student at the École Normale Supérieure and agrégé in philosophy, Maël Renouard taught philosophy at the Paris-1 Panthéon-Sorbonne University between 2002 and 2006 and at the École Normale Supérieure between 2006 and 2009, as an attaché temporaire d'enseignement et de recherche.

From 2009 until 2012, he was technical advisor responsible for speeches in the cabinet of François Fillon, then Prime Minister of France.

He has translated Nietzsche, Joseph Conrad, Arthur Schnitzler among others. His translation of the Symposium by Plato was adapted and directed by Juliette Deschamps at the Auditorium du Louvre in March 2007.

He was awarded the 2013 edition of the prix Décembre for La Réforme de l'opéra de Pékin.

A decree dated 16 January 2014 made him a chevalier of the Ordre des Arts et Lettres.

== Film ==
Renouard regularly wrote for the magazine Trafic (revue) between 2004 and 2010 and made a cameo in Frontier of the Dawn by Philippe Garrel in 2008.

== Works ==
- 2002: L'Œil et l'Attente. Sur Julien Gracq, Chambéry, Éditions Comp’Act, series "La bibliothèque volante", ISBN 2-87661-280-1
- 2009: Yves Bonnefoy, image et mélancolie, inks by Isabelle Raviolo, Paris, La Dame d'onze heures, ISBN 978-2-9529517-0-8
- 2013: La Réforme de l'opéra de Pékin, Paris, Payot & Rivages, ISBN 978-2-7436-2618-1 — Prix Décembre 2013
- 2016: Fragments d'une mémoire infinie, Paris, Grasset, coll. « Figures ».ISBN 978-2-246-85459-3
- 2018: Notes sur Lascaux, Saint-Loup-de-Naud, Éditions Du Sandre, ISBN 978-2-3582-1125-3
- 2020: L'historiographe du royaume, Paris, Grasset, ISBN 978-2-2468-1526-6
