= Jean Baptiste Charlemagne-Baudet =

French-Russian sculptor (1734–1789)

Jean Baptiste Charlemagne-Baudet (Russian: Жан-Батист Шарлемань-Боде; 1734 in Rouen – 26 August 1789 in Saint Petersburg) was a French-Russian ornamental sculptor.

== Biography ==
In 1777, he moved to Russia; one of the many artists invited there by Catherine the Great to provide decorative works for the new Imperial residence (now known as the Catherine Palace), in Tsarskoye Selo. In addition to his work there, he provided decorations for numerous other country palaces, as well as in the large church at the Winter Palace, the Church of St. Catherine, the museum at the Imperial Academy of Arts, and several other locations.

The academy accepted him as a candidate for the title of "Academician" in 1785. His entry for consideration was a large marble vase, with fruits and flowers, which was installed on the balustrade in the conference hall at the academy. For some reason that has not been determined, the awarding of the title was delayed until 1794; five years after his death. The posthumous certificate was presented to his heirs.

He was interred at Volkovo Cemetery. His sons, Iosif and Ludwig, became architects. His daughter, Marguerite, married the Italian-born architect, Luigi Rusca.
