= Apsidiole =

Church architectural term

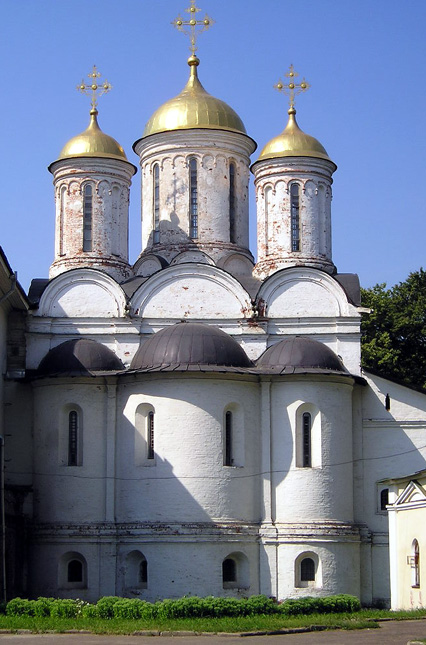
An apse with two apsidoles at the orthodox cathedral of Jaroslavl in Russia

An apsidole or absidiale is a small or secondary apse, one of the apses on either side of the main apse in a triapsidal church, or one of the apse-chapels when they project on the exterior of the church, particularly if the projection resembles an apse in shape.

Francis Bond says that the Norman plan of eastern limb, which the Norman builders brought over to England at the Conquest, contained a central apse flanked by apsidioles.
