= Charlemagne (given name) =

Charlemagne (748–814) was the King of the Franks, King of the Lombards and Emperor of the Carolingian Empire.

Charlemagne is also the given name of:

- Charlemagne Anyamah (born 1938), French decathlete
- Charlemagne Azongnitode (born 2001), Beninese footballer
- Charlemagne de Maupas (1818–1888), French lawyer, politician and head of the Parisian Police when Napoleon III seized power in a coup
- Charlemagne Palestine, American artist and musician Chaim Moshe Tzadik Palestine (born 1945 or 1947)
- Charlemagne Péralte (1886–1919), Haitian nationalist leader
- Charlemagne Tower (1809–1889), American lawyer, businessman and mining developer
- Charlemagne Tower Jr. (1848–1923), American businessman, scholar and diplomat, son of the above
