= Charlemagne Viaduct =

Charlemagne Viaduct Viaduc Charlemagne
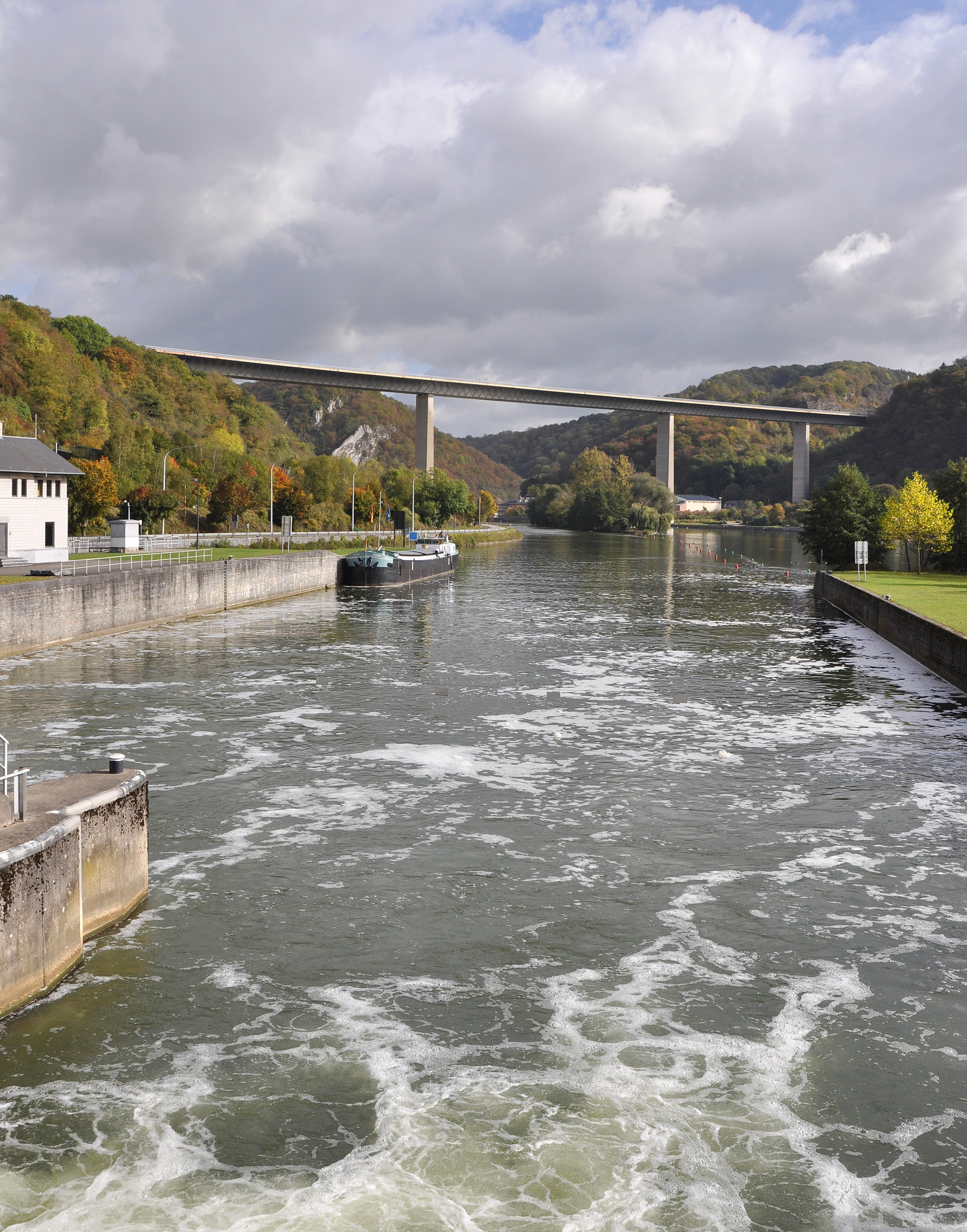
- Coordinates: 50.241492°N 4.917922°E
- Carries: N97
- Crosses: Meuse
- Locale: Dinant, Namur, Belgium

Characteristics
- Design: Box girder bridge
- Total length: 642 m (2,106 ft)
- Width: 27 m (89 ft)

Location
- Interactive map of Charlemagne Viaduct

The Charlemagne Viaduct (French: Viaduc Charlemagne), also called the Viaduc d'Anseremme (not to be confused with the Anseremme Viaduct, which is a railway bridge located upstream) or the Viaduc de Dinant, is a box girder bridge crossing the Meuse river, in the province of Namur, in Belgium.

== Location ==
The bridge is located in the village of Anseremme in the province of Namur of Dinant in the Wallonia region. Upstream, the viaduct is preceded by lock 3 called Anseremme, at 0.62 km and by the Hastière-Lavaux Bridge at 11.15 km; while downstream, it is followed by the Charles de Gaulle bridge in Dinant at 2.29 km.

== Description of the work ==
The viaduct is a box girder bridge made of concrete composed of six bays of varying lengths, except for bays three and five which are 124 meters long; the first, second, fourth and sixth bays are respectively 60 meters, 92 meters, 166 meters and 76 meters long.

=== Degradation ===
In August 2022, the viaduct underwent partial renovation, particularly the tracks which were in very poor condition with numerous potholes. This renovation work will be the first intervention since the viaduct's construction in forty years, apart from the installation of suicide prevention barriers in 2018.
