= Iosif Ivanovich Charlemagne =

Russian architect

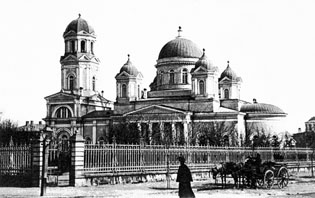
The Alexander Nevsky Cathedral in Simferopol (demolished in 1930; currently being reconstructed)

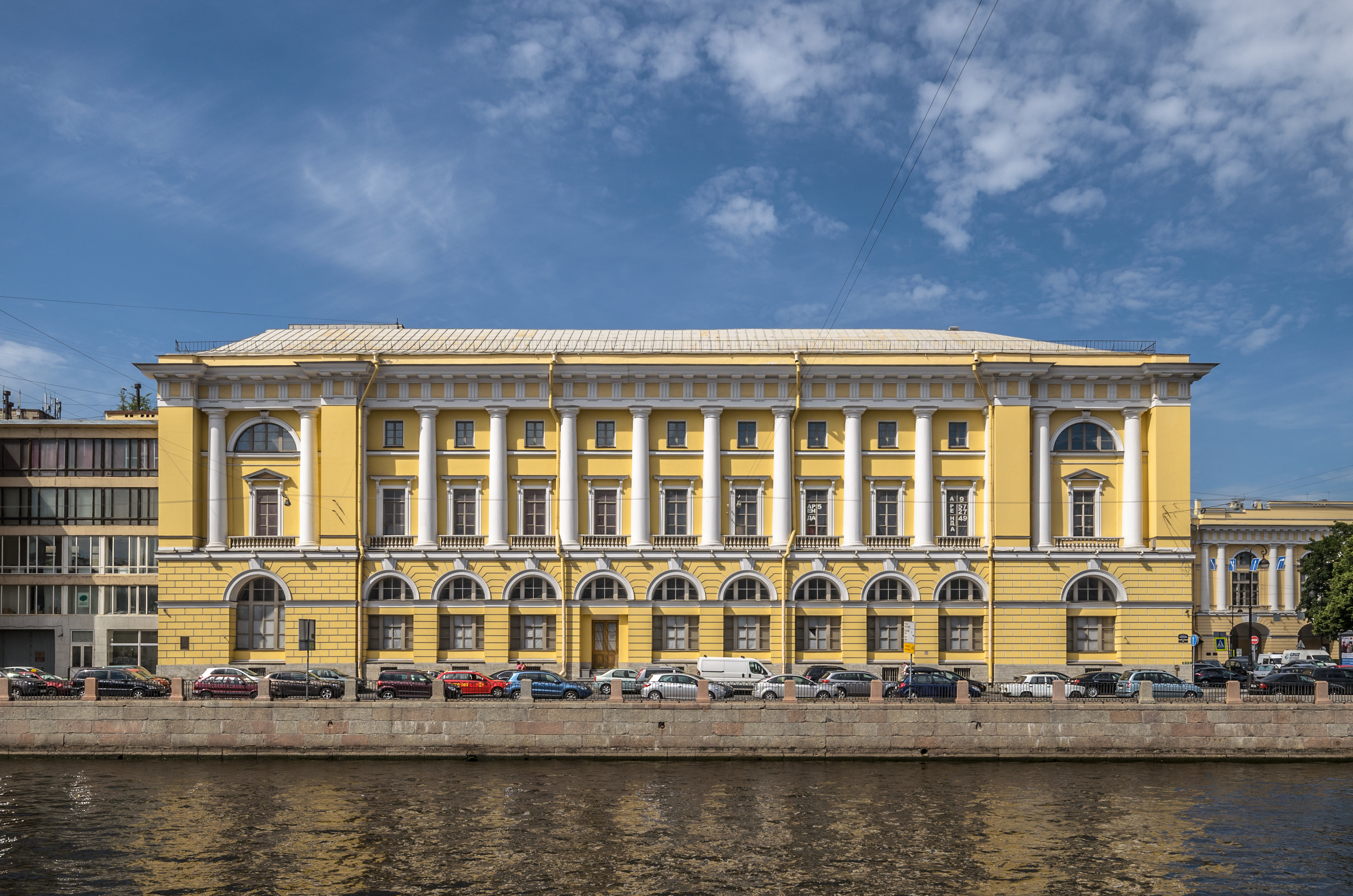
The Ministry of Internal Affairs (from preliminary plans by Carlo Rossi)

Iosif Ivanovich Charlemagne, or Sharleman (Russian: Иосиф Иванович Шарлемань, 5 November 1782, Saint Petersburg – 8 December 1861, Saint Petersburg) was a Russian architect of French ancestry. He also served as a State Councillor. Two of his sons, Adolf and Iosif, became well-known painters.

== Biography ==
His father, Jean Baptiste Charlemagne-Baudet, was a sculptor; originally from Rouen. His younger brother, Ludwig (or Lodovik), would also become an architect. Together with their other brothers, Ivan and Karl, they enrolled at the Imperial Academy of Arts in 1797, on a scholarship. Within a short time, his projects were receiving awards. His official graduation came in 1803 but, at his request, he remained at the academy for another year to "gain great success not as a student, but as an artist".

After completing his extra year, he joined the civil service; drafting projects for the construction of government buildings. In 1817, he became a member of the building committee of the "Department of State Economy and Public Buildings" at the Ministry of Internal Affairs. From 1821 to 1822, at the behest of Viktor Kochubey, the Minister of the Interior, he developed a series of projects for buildings that would employ medicinal waters and balneotherapy. Beginning in 1826, his plans were used to build the St. Nicholas Baths in Pyatigorsk; under the direction of the Swiss architect Giuseppe Marco Bernardazzi.

His activities were not limited to the area around Saint Petersburg. As a court architect, he often travelled with, or on behalf of, members of the Royal Family. For example, in 1825, shortly after his marriage, the Imperial Court began developing a summer residence in Taganrog, on the Sea of Azov. Together with Daniil Babkin (1771-1858), the Imperial Kammer Fourier (a type of court supervisor), he went there to prepare the premises.

He also served as an architect at the State Audit Office, and was a member of the "Department of Projects and Estimates" at the Main Directorate of Railways. His many services were recognized when he was awarded the Order of Saint Vladimir, third degree, and an honorary membership in the Imperial Academy.
