= Iosif Iosifovich Charlemagne =

Russian architect and painter

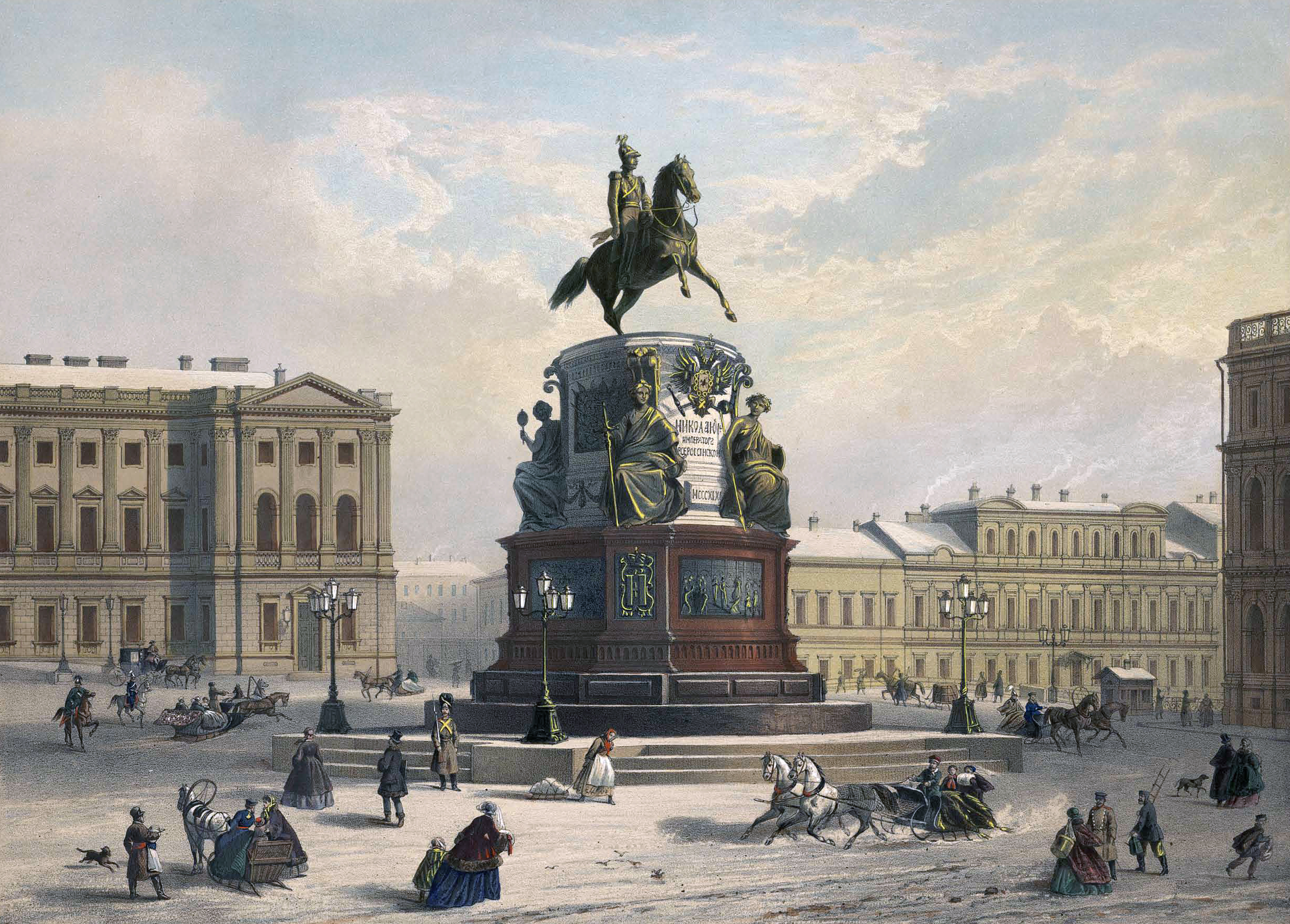
Monument to Nicholas I

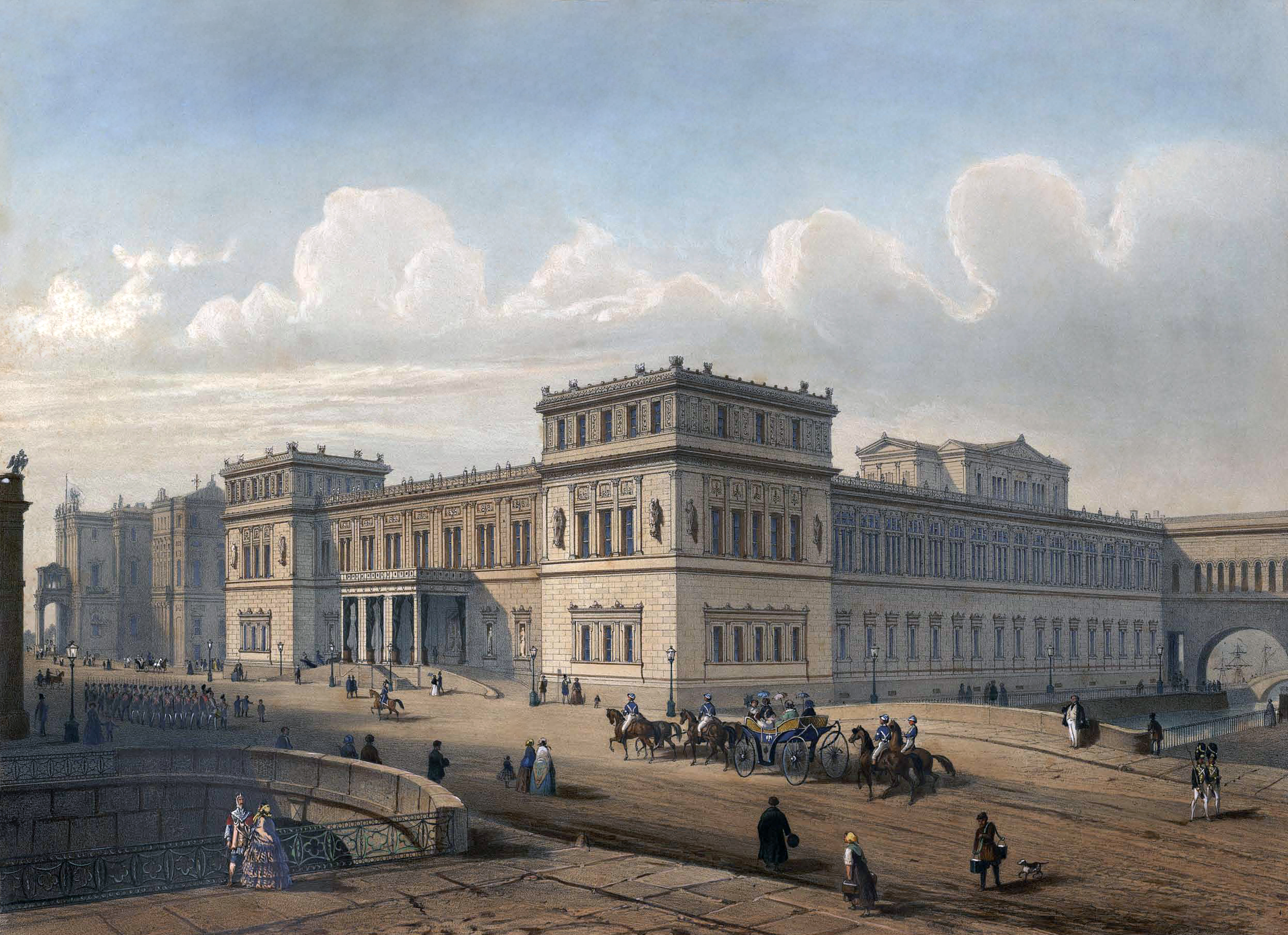
The New Hermitage

Iosif Iosifovich Charlemagne, or Sharleman (Russian: Иосиф Иосифович Шарлемань; 13 April 1824, Saint Petersburg – 8 May 1870, Saint Petersburg) was a Russian architect and painter of French ancestry; son of the architect Iosif Ivanovich Charlemagne.

== Biography ==
He began his education at Saint Peter's School, a German-language institution, then attended the Imperial Academy of Arts, where he studied architecture with Alexander Brullov. He graduated in 1846, with the title of "Free Artist". Two years later, he entered into service at the Imperial Court; becoming an assistant to Nikolai Efimov. One of his first projects involved work on the "New Hermitage", which kept him occupied until 1851.

Later, he served as an assistant to Auguste de Montferrand, and helped to draft the plans for a monument to Tsar Nicholas I, under the direction of Nicholas Benois. His work was largely concerned with cost estimates and creating images of how the structures would look when completed. His private commissions were of a similar nature. One such project, Mikhailovka dacha for Grand Duke Mikhail Nikolayevich in Strelna, earned him the title of "Academician" in 1857.

His fame rests largely on his watercolor drawings, which were very popular with patrons of the arts and members of the Royal Family, who often placed orders for them. During a stay abroad, in 1860, he painted a series of views of Germany for Grand Duchess Olga Feodorovna. Together with his brother, Adolf, a well-known painter, he created a circle of young artists, professional and amateur, who would meet in the evenings to draw.

He died after a long, serious illness, and was buried next to his father in Vyborg Cemetery.

== Sources ==
- Biography from the Русский биографический словарь @ Russian Wikisource
- Biography from the Большая биографическая энциклопедия @ Академик
