= Charlemagne (band) =

American indie rock band

Charlemagne was an indie rock band from Madison, Wisconsin, led by former NoahJohn singer/songwriter, Carl Johns. Originally a Johns solo project, Charlemagne developed into a group, which toured Europe in 2004 and released three albums between 2004 and 2007, including two on SideCho Records.

== Band members ==
- Carl Johns (a.k.a. Charlemagne), plays a little bit of everything, songwriter and producer
- William Borowski (a.k.a. The Equalizer, BB, Billions), bass guitar, claps
- Tenaya Darlington (a.k.a. Ladybird), backing vocals, triangle, claps
- Kaleen Enke (a.k.a. Katydid), backing vocals, guitar, Tambourine, claps
- Alex Fulton (a.k.a. A-12), drums, claps
- Dietrich Gosser (a.k.a. D, Titrich), acoustic guitar, bass guitar, backing vocals
- Ivan Klipstein, guitar, bass guitar, keyboards, backing vocals
- Brandon Schreiner (a.k.a. Kid B), guitar, Keyboards, Drums, Beats, backing vocals
- Curtis Whaley (a.k.a. The Arty Bastard, RTB), keyboards, claps, co-producer and graphic designer for Detour Allure

== Discography ==
- Charlemagne (2004) Loose
- Detour Allure (2005 · SideCho Records)
- We Can Build An Island (2007 · SideCho Records)

== Footnote ==
The group has no relation to late 1980s/early 1990s Hollywood glam metal band Charlemagne, whose eponymous 1994 album was rereleased in 2009.
