= Ludwig Charlemagne =

Russian architect (1784–1845)

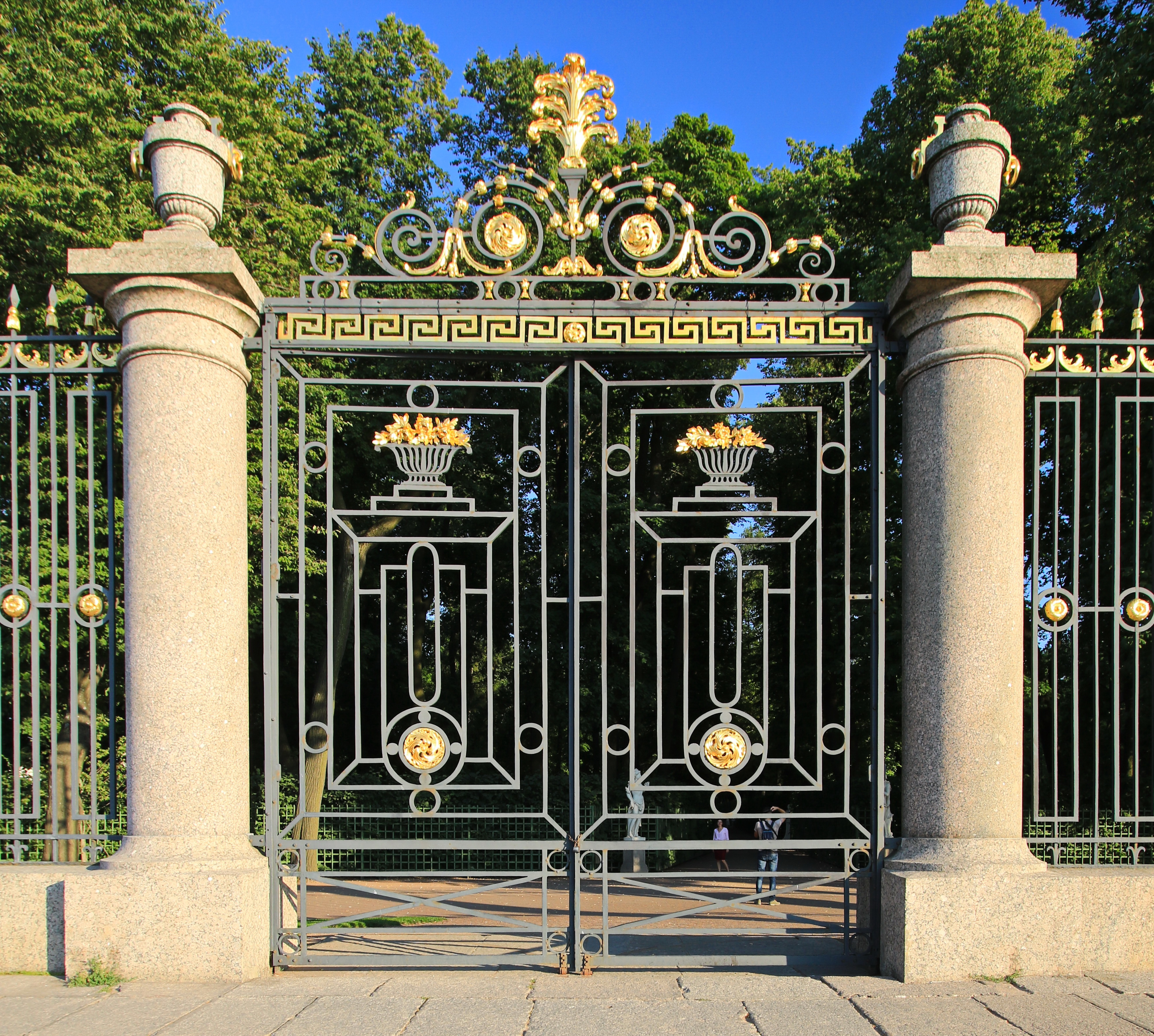
The gate at the Summer Gardens

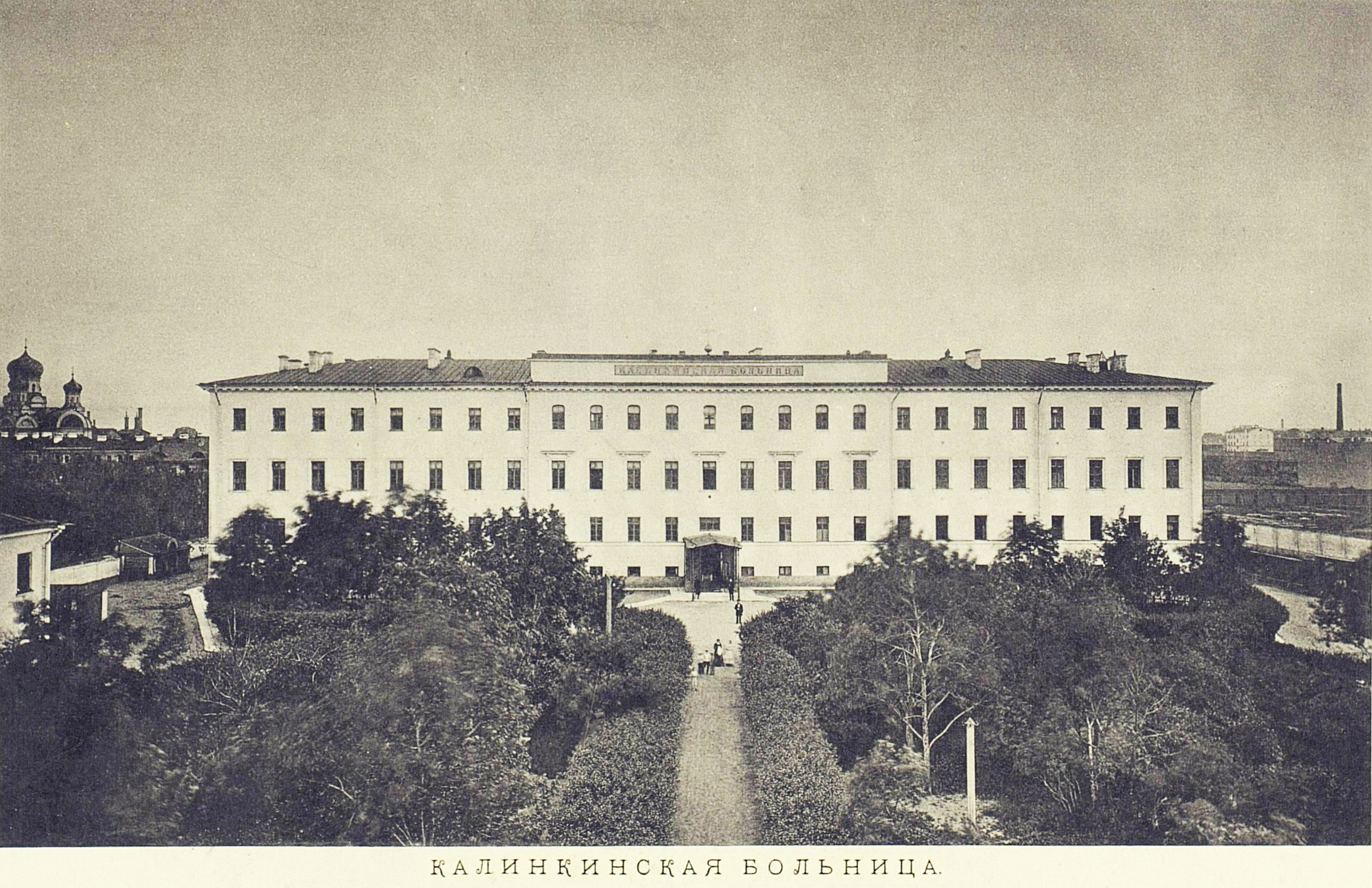
Kalinka Hospital (c. 1878)

Ludwig Ivanovich Charlemagne or Sharleman (Russian: Людвиг Иванович Шарлемань; 1784 in Saint Petersburg – 16 November 1845 in Saint Petersburg) was a Russian architect of French descent. He is sometimes referred to as Lodovik.

== Biography ==
His father, the sculptor Jean Baptiste Charlemagne-Baudet, came to Russia from Rouen in 1777, at the invitation of Catherine the Great. In 1797, together with his brothers Iosif, Ivan, and Karl, he entered the Imperial Academy of Fine Arts on a scholarship. He graduated in 1806 with a gold medal, second degree, then began working as an assistant to the architects Luigi Rusca and Alexander Mikhailov.

In 1820, he took a position in the Quartermaster's Office, where he was involved in alterations and repairs at the Yelagin Palace, Winter Palace, and Tauride Palace; among others. An iron gate at the Summer Garden was cast from his designs, in 1826. The following year, a tea house with Doric columns was added. On the Kamenny Islands, he built a guardhouse for the Kamenny Island Palace. He also constructed several dachas for the Imperial Family and the government.

From 1828 to 1832, he was involved in a major project: the Institute for Noble Maidens in Poltava; from master plans by Alexander Staubert. During that time, he also began working on the Kalinka Hospital (currently an office building), which occupied him until 1833. Concurrently with those projects, he built an orphanage (completed 1834). Ten years later, it was converted into a new home for the Tsarskoye Selo Lyceum.

He died of dropsy, and was interred at Volkovo Cemetery.
