= Lee Asher =

American close-up magician

- Born: July 1976 (age 50); Ft. Lauderdale, Florida, U.S.
- Occupations: Technological inventor, Sleight of Hand Artist
- Height: 5'7
- Title: Card Star
- Predecessor: Lou Tannen
- Website: LeeAsher.com

Lee Asher (born 1976) is a close-up magician noted for originating new card tricks and hypnotic sleight of hand moves. He is considered an expert in playing cards, and as a collector is especially known for his work with 52 Plus Joker, the American Playing Card Collectors Club, of which he is the serving President. He has served as a magic consultant for professional magicians such as Greg Frewin.

== Early years ==
Lee Asher was born in Fort Lauderdale, Florida, as the older of two children. His father Mark Horowitz managed an optometric practice, but was a semi-professional magician who learned magic as a boy from Al Flosso and Lou Tannen in New York City in the 1960s.

He attended Marjory Stoneman Douglas High School in Parkland until 1994, and in 1999 completed a Bachelor of Science in Hospitality (with an emphasis on Casino Administration) at the University of Nevada/Las Vegas. During these student years, he would often sneak into casinos like the Golden Nugget, and watch magician Michael Skinner, who would later influence his magic. He had a job doing magic demonstrations at the Magic Mansion, and from 1996 to 1997 worked at Caesars Magical Empire in Caesars Palace to perform card magic under the character title "Cardius Sharkus", working with world-famous magicians including Earl Nelson, Jeff McBride, Chappy Brazil, Joey Burton, Daryl, Michael Ammar, Jonathan Pendragon.

== Education ==
Lee Asher attended Marjory Stoneman Douglas High School in Parkland, Florida until 1994, and then enrolled at the University of Nevada, Las Vegas, from which Lee graduated with honors. During this time, Lee would frequently sneak into casinos such as the Golden Nugget to watch master magician Michael Skinner who would later influence his magic.

== Magic career ==
Asher knew that he wanted to be a magician from an early age. His first magic gigs were wherever he could get a job on evenings and weekends, but his real passion came from inventing magic. At the young age of 15, he invented a technique titled 'The Asher Twist'.

He earned first place as Junior Close-up Champion of the International Brotherhood of Magicians (1991 and 1992), and was a featured lecturer at the inaugural Session Convention, a British convention for close-up magicians, in 2006.

Since then, Lee has appeared multiple times on prime time television, on channels such as the Discovery Channel, The Learning Channel, and 'The World's Greatest Magic on NBC, delivered lectures on magic around the world, and made guest appearances at magic camps and magic podcasts.

Asher has published extensively, including in magic industry magazines such as Trapdoor, Channel One, The Penumbra, The Magic Circle, Apocalypse, Labyrinth, and Genii Magazine. He is also part of CURIOSIDADES, a group of magicians formed by BJ Bueno to bring magic to Bueno's home country (Dominican Republic).

== Playing cards ==
Asher is highly regarded for his contributions and expertise as a collector of playing cards. In 2016 he became the youngest-ever president of 52 Plus Joker, an American playing card collectors club. He is also actively involved in the publication of their magazine, Card Culture.

He is known for his passion for Jerry's Nugget playing cards, and is considered instrumental in popularizing the original decks, and in 2019 spearheaded a very successful project to recreate them, with a Kickstarter project raising almost half a million dollars with the help of over 4,000 backers. In collaboration with several other magicians, he was also involved in the successful project for crowdfunding the Conjuror Community deck of playing cards, which raised $142,543 with 1,694 backers.

== Awards and honors ==
- International Brotherhood of Magicians 1991, Junior Close-up magic (Baltimore, MD)
- International Brotherhood of Magicians 1992, Junior Close-up magic (Salt Lake City, UT)
- 2006, Las Vegas Magic Film Festival || Inspiration Award (Las Vegas, NV)

== Published works ==
Lee Asher's mainstream releases:

- (1995) Cooking with Lee Asher VHS
- (1999) Well Done VHS
- (1998) Sex Sells Booklet
- (1998) Thinking Out Loud Booklet
- (1999) Five Card Stud VHS
- (1999) Le Asher Booklet
- (2000) Pulp Friction Booklet
- (2001) Close Cover Before Striking Booklet
- (2001) Hand Jobs Booklet
- (2002) Five Card Stud DVD
- (2003) Hit the Road DVD
- (2004) Losing Control Cd-Rom
- (2004) Catch 33: Three Card Monte PDF
- (2005) Diving Board Double PDF
- (2005) Three Stylin Booklet
- (2005) On Tour with Michael Ammar
- (2006) Asher Twist DVD
- (2007) Thunderbird: The Modern Ace Production PDF
- (2007) WITNESS: A Lesson in Simplicity DVD
- (2008) Nu Sense co-produced with Alain Nu
- (2009) Lee Asher Signature Series 605s High Quality Playing Cards printed by Naipes Heraclio Fournier
- (2010) Losing Control PDF
- (2010) Jerry's Nugget playing cards Care and Handling Guide
- (2012) Conditioning and Care Guide for your 605 playing cards printed by Naipes Heraclio Fournier
- (2012) Asher Twist DVD (HD)
- (2013) Catch 33: Three Card Monte PDF Update

== Notes ==
Lee Asher is 6'3 weights 191 pounds and his birthday is August 25,1988
