= Franco Pratesi =

Italian academic

Franco Pratesi (born 1940) is a retired professor of materials science and games researcher from Florence, Italy. He has contributed to the history of chess, draughts, playing cards (including Tarot games, Gemini-Minchiate) and Go. Pratesi spent years studying the archives in Florence and other towns to uncover the earliest references to playing cards. He is an Honorary Fellow of the International Playing Card Society and has written extensively in The Playing-Card.

== Professional activity ==
Franco Pratesi was born in 1940 in Florence and graduated in 1964 in Physical chemistry. As associate professor in the University of Florence, Pratesi was involved for decades in research and teaching of Materials Science. After early studies in molecular spectroscopy, he continued research on the structure and reactivity of single-crystal metal surfaces, and then on the high-temperature strength of superalloys.

== Professional Works (selection) ==
- F. Pratesi, R. Freymann. Spectres IR de vibration v(CH) de complexes pyridine-halogenures metalliques. Comptes Rendus Acad. Science Paris, B 266, 1968, 327–329.
- G. Rovida, F. Pratesi. Chemisorption of Oxygen on the Silver (110) Surface. Surface Science, 52,1975, 542–555.
- F. Pratesi, G. Rovida. Competitive Accumulation of Sulfur and Graphite on the Cobalt Surface. Applied Surface Science, 10, 1982, 264–272.
- F. Pratesi, G. Zonfrillo, A. Del Puglia. Fatigue maps and multistage life prediction methods. Nuclear Engineering and Design, 133, Amsterdam 1992, pp. 325–333.
- A. Del Puglia, F. Pratesi, G. Zonfrillo. Bithermal Fatigue Testing - Experimental and Prediction Problems. In: “Fatigue under Thermal and Mechanical Loading: Mechanisms, Mechanics and Modelling”, J. Bressers et al. eds., Dordrecht 1996, pp. 47–53

== Research on the history of games ==
Pratesi has put online at naibi.net his collected articles on the history of games, published in journals (some 350 in toto) together with his contributions published in the web. At present, this collection held at John McLeod’s webspace.

=== Chess ===
His study of the history of games was stimulated in the 1980s by chess historian Adriano Chicco, who convinced Pratesi that unknown documents could be discovered among the many ancient books and manuscripts kept in Florentine libraries. This soon led to the discovery of two unknown chess manuscripts. His research continued in the main libraries of other towns with, in particular, the discovery of an important chess manuscript in Cesena. Pratesi kept useful correspondence with foreign historians. As a result of his research on chess history, Pratesi has published several books, and more than 150 articles in chess journals.

=== Draughts ===
Pratesi published a few articles on the history of this game and took part in the discussion among the specialists of the subject, especially about the early spread of the game.

=== Card games ===
In the 1970s and 1980s Sylvia Mann and Michael Dummett published pioneering works in England and established the International Playing-Card Society; a further contribution came from Paris with Thierry Depaulis. All of them were interested in the early history of playing cards, but the important contribution of Florence remained unknown. With their encouragement, Pratesi extended research from libraries to archives with old documents. Many ancient documents and deeds of the local administrations have been kept in Florence, and moreover account books of retailers from the 15th century have been preserved there (and in a few other towns of Tuscany, such as Arezzo and Prato) with surprising detail. A long search has finally assigned to Florence its due place in the early stages of playing cards in Europe, including its contribution to the earliest Tarot cards and games. Some research with new results has also been performed in other towns. In particular, Pratesi is known for his discovery of a sheet of paper in Bologna that indicates that the divinatory use of Tarot was being practised there around 1750 and may have developed independently of its invention in France. Results of these studies were published as articles in journals, and more recently also in the web - particularly at trionfi.com (2011/12 and 2012/13) and naibi.net - and in a few books. In recent years Franco Pratesi published mainly in Italian language. 33 essays were translated by Michael S. Howard to English language. Pratesi's articles are often the discussed topic in Tarot History forums

=== Go ===
Pratesi has devoted about ten years of study to the history of this ancient game's spread into the Western world, which only became significant in the 20th century. Pratesi found most of the relevant literature in the collection of Theo van Ees in Leiden and with his collaboration, books have been published on Go history and bibliography in Europe. Pratesi has also published about fifty articles on the history of Go.

== Selected works on the history of games ==
- Un manoscritto spagnolo del periodo iniziale degli scacchi, Scacchi e Scienze Applicate, 4 (1986) 30–34.
- The Earliest Tarot Pack Known. The Playing-Card, 18 (1989) 28–38. (Naibi.net)
- Il manoscritto scacchistico di Cesena, Scacchi e Scienze Applicate, 15 Sup. 2 (1996) 1–18.
- Franco Pratesi, Alessandro Castelli, Go variants. Macerata 2000.
- Franco Pratesi, Theo van Ees, Periodigo: go periodical literature in the western world. Florence 2001.
- Theo C. van Ees, Franco Pratesi, Bibliogo: go books in the western world. Leiden 2004.
- Itago: panoramica storica del go italiano, Roma 2005.
- Comments on the Early History of Draughts. Ludica, 11 (2005) 7–18.
- Eurogo Vol. I: Part 1: Go in Europe until 1920 / with the assistance of Theo van Ees; Part. 2: Go in Europe 1920-1950 / with the assistance of Klaus Heine and Theo van Ees, 2. ed. Roma 2005.
- Eurogo: Vol. II: Part 3: Go in Europe until 1949–1958; Part. 4: Go in Europe 1959–1968. Roma 2005.
- Eurogo Vol. III: Part 5: Go in Europe 1968–1978; Part. 6: Go in Europe 1979–1988. Roma 2006.
- Antichi documenti sugli scacchi a Firenze. Brescia 2006.
- Scacchi visti da lontano. Brescia 2006.
- Chess Theory. Its Structure and Evolution. In: H. Holländer U. Schädler (Hrgs.), Scacchia Ludus. Band I. Aix-la-Chapelle 2008. pp. 479–501.
- Scacchi a giro per l'Italia. Brescia 2008.
- Playing-Card Trade in the 15th-Century Florence. North Walsham 2012.
- Giochi di carte nel Granducato di Toscana. Ariccia 2015.
- Giochi di carte nella repubblica fiorentina. Ariccia 2016.
- Scacchi dai manoscritti an internet. Brescia 2017.
- Scacchi da Venafro al futuro. Tricase (LE) 2017.
- Playing-Card Production in Florence. Tricase (LE) 2018.
- Rebus visti da lontano. Tricase (LE) [2018] privately printed.
- Observations on Chess Set Design. Tricase (LE) [2018] privately printed.
- Exports of Florentine Minchiate, 1729–1762. Ludica, 24 (2018) 20–38.
