= Albert Field (archivist) =

American art archivist (1916-2003)

- Field in the 1950s
- Born: George Albert Field Jr. November 8, 1916; Maplewood, New Jersey, United States
- Died: August 4, 2003 (aged 86); Queens, New York City, New York
- Known for: Cataloging and authenticating Salvador Dalí works
- Parents: George Albert Field Sr. (father); Marjorie Comstock Mattocks (mother)

George Albert Field Jr. (November 8, 1916 – August 4, 2003) was known for cataloging and authenticating artwork by the surrealist artist Salvador Dalí. Designated by Dalí as his official archivist in 1955, Field went on to archive and confirm the authenticity of thousands of Dalí works, mostly prints.

== Early life ==
Albert Field was born to an affluent family in Maplewood, New Jersey. He was the only child of George Albert Field Sr. and Marjorie Comstock Mattocks; his father owned a firm which designed and produced paper currency for foreign countries.

As a young man, Field earned a B.A. in English from Columbia and M.A. in English from Harvard. After graduation, Field was an English and science teacher at Columbia Grammar and Preparatory School; he was also a mathematics, English and science teacher at various schools in New York City, including JHS 141, The Steinway in Astoria, Queens.

== Dalí archivist ==
Albert Field became interested in the works of Salvador Dalí after visiting the artist's "Dream of Venus" pavilion exhibit at the 1939 World's Fair in Queens, New York. Field's interest in Dalí deepened after attending the artist's 1941–42 exhibition at the Museum of Modern Art. He became closely acquainted with Dalí in the 1940s, meeting with him frequently upon the artist's travels to New York. During this time, Field began informally collecting information about Dalí's many works on handwritten index cards.

In 1955, Field became Dalí's official archivist upon the artist's request. Field founded the Salvador Dalí Archives, a repository of Dalí information which continues its authentication work to this day.

The extensive body of work which Dalí produced during his lifetime (as well as his easily replicable signature) attracted a large number of forgers. As official archivist, Field cataloged and authenticated thousands of Dalí works, traveling to Europe over 40 times and gaining access to privately owned pieces by presenting letters signed by Dalí himself.

During Dalí's sojourns at the St. Regis Hotel in New York between the 1950s and 1970s, Field routinely observed the artist confirm or deny the authenticity of pieces brought before him. Ian Gibson describes Field by 1963 as "a seasoned habitué of Dali's Sunday court at the King Cole Bar" with "privileged status as a friend and collaborator."

Over time, Field began to focus primarily on Dalí prints, and his expertise in authentication was regularly utilized by interested individuals, museums and auction houses including Christie's and Sotheby's. Field participated in over 20 art fraud investigations during his career and testified in court as an expert witness. In 1996, Field published The Official Catalog of the Graphic Works of Salvador Dali, a reference of virtually all of Dalí's authentic prints, as well as numerous fakes.

A large portion of his collection of Dalí books, works and other materials were donated to the Salvador Dalí Museum in St. Petersburg, Florida. This collection includes "Landscape" (c. 1910), arguably the earliest known oil painting by Dalí.

== Later life ==
Albert Field spent the later part of his life in Astoria, Queens, New York. He was a member of the Oratorio Society of New York for 53 years, singing bass with the group. He also attained the rank of Lieutenant Colonel in the Civil Air Patrol.

In or around 1972, Field completed hiking the Appalachian Trail and published an account of his experiences in the 1975 book, Hiking the Appalachian Trail, Volume One. He was Executive Director of the New York-New Jersey Trail Conference from 1977 to 1980.

Field claimed to have the world's largest collection of playing cards, possessing over 6,000 decks in total, some of which date back to the 15th century. Most of his collection was donated to Columbia University. His eponymous 1987 book, Transformation Playing Cards, cataloged and presented all known examples of one particular type playing cards.

In 1998, Field stated that he had found the solution to Charles Dickens's unfinished work The Mystery of Edwin Drood. Field's theorized solution, likely drawn up in the 1960s, was published posthumously in 2017.

Since 2003, the Archives has continued its work under the direction of Field's former colleague and friend, Frank Hunter.
