= Thierry Depaulis =

French historian (born 1949)

Thierry Depaulis (born 1949) is a French independent historian of games and especially of playing cards, card games, and board games. He is President of the association Le Vieux Papier, a member of the editorial board of the International Board Game Studies Association, and a member of the board of directors of the foundation of the Swiss Museum of Games. He was President of the International Playing-Card Society from 2017 to 2022.

He has published a number of articles and books in the field of games and playing cards and has contributed to the French gaming journal Jeux & Stratégie for several years.

Since 2016, he has collaborated with the Édition Numérique Collaborative et CRitique de l’Encyclopédie (ENCCRE) group, which has digitized and placed online the first edition of the 18th-century French encyclopaedia by Diderot, de D’Alembert et de Jaucourt.

== Publications ==
- Tarot, jeu et magie, Bibliothèque Nationale, 1984 ISBN 2717716998
- Jeux de hasard sur papier: les "loteries" de salon, Le Vieux Papier, 1987
- "Ombre et lumière. Un peu de lumière sur l'hombre", in The Playing-Card, XV-4, XVI-1, XVI-2, 1987
- Les cartes de la Révolution: cartes à jouer et propagande (catalogue d'exposition), Issy-les-Moulineaux, Musée Français de la Carte à Jouer, 1989
- Les cartes à jouer au "portrait de Paris" avant 1701, Le Vieux Papier, 1991
- Les loix du jeu : bibliographie de la littérature technique de jeux de cartes en français avant 1800. Suivie d'un supplément couvrant les années 1800-1850, Paris, Cymbalum Mundi, 1994
- 'Storia dei tarocchi liguri-piemontesi', dans Antichi tarocchi liguri-piemontesi, with Giordano Berti and Marisa Chiesa, Torino, 1995, ISBN 8886131291
- A Wicked Pack of Cards: The Origins of the Occult Tarot, London, Duckworth, 1996 (with Ronald Decker and Sir Michael Dummett) ISBN 0312162944
- Histoire du bridge, Paris, Bornemann, 1997 ISBN 2851825607
- Les jeux de hasard en Savoie-Piémont sous l'Ancien Régime, in Études Savoisiennes, 4, 1995
- Inca dice and board games, dans Board Games Studies, 1, 1998
- Le livre du jeu de dames, Paris, Bornemann, 1999 (with Philippe Jeanneret)
- La plus ancienne représentation datée de joueurs de dames (1492), in Board Game Studies, 7, 2004 (with Jean Simonata)
- Cartes et cartiers dans les anciens États de Savoie (1400-1860), North Walsham, International Playing-Card Society, 2005 (IPCS Papers, 4)
- Petite histoire du poker. Paris, Editions Pole / Cymbalum Mundi, 2008 ISBN 2848840897
- De Lisboa a Macáçar : um capítulo desconhecido das cartas portuguesas na Ásia / De Lisbonne à Macassar : un chapitre méconnu des cartes portugaises en Asie, Lisbonne, Apenas, 2008 (Bisca Lambida, 10)
- Temps nouveaux, jeux nouveaux (as well as some 40 catalogue entries), in Ève Netchine (ed.), Jeux de princes, jeux de vilains, Paris, Bibliothèque nationale de France / Le Seuil, 2009 ISBN 2020997509
- Explaining the Tarot : two Italian Renaissance essays on the meaning of the Tarot pack (with Ross Caldwell and Marco Ponzi), Oxford : Maproom, 2010
- Le Tarot révélé : une histoire du tarot d’après les documents, La Tour-de-Peilz : Swiss Museum of Games, 2013 ISBN 9782883750135
- (ed.) Tarots enluminés, chefs-d’œuvre de la Renaissance italienne. Issy-les-Moulineaux : Musée Français de la Carte à Jouer; Paris, Liénart, 2021 (exhibition catalogue) ISBN 9782359063288
- The Cardmakers of Alsace 1441-1870, The International Playing-Card Society, 2023 (IPCS Library n° 9)
