= Flemish Hunting Deck =

Only complete set of 52 playing cards from the 15. century

- Cloister's Set of 52 Playing Cards, Hofjaren Jachtpakket (Dutch)
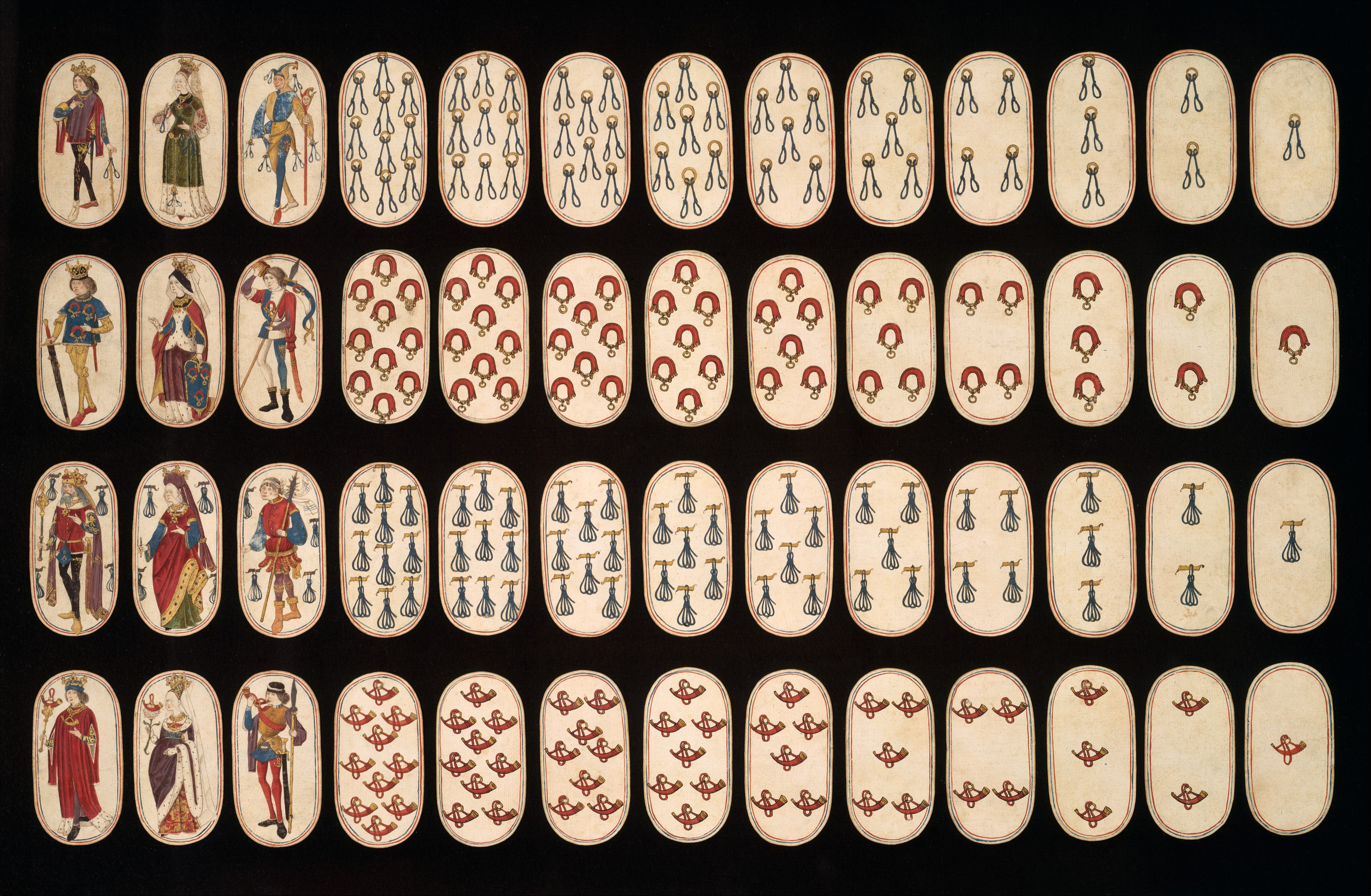
- Year: Between 1470 and 1480
- Medium: Hand-drawn and painted on pasteboard
- Subject: Playing Cards
- Dimensions: 10 cm × 5.1 cm (4 in × 2 in)
- Location: Metropolitan Museum of Art, New York, United States

The Flemish Hunting Deck, also known as the Cloisters set of fifty-two playing cards and Hofjaren Jachtpakket (in Dutch), is a set of fifty-two playing cards owned by the Metropolitan Museum of Art, New York, United States. It is significant in that it is the only complete set of ordinary playing cards from the fifteenth century. Estimate ranges of manufacture are between 1470 and 1480.

The rounded-ended cards consist of suits represented by hunting equipment along with face cards which represent exaggerated fashion from the 15th century.

The cards are hand-drawn and painted on pasteboard, with highlights of gold and silver, in the contemporary technique for illuminated manuscripts.

== History ==
The set was most likely made in the Southern Netherlands, in Flanders specifically. Research was conducted into the cards by Sotheby's fashion experts, looking into the details of the fashion of the face cards. The research concluded that the type of jacket and haircut, worn above the ears, was popular for royalty between 1470 and 1480. A further test of the paper and paint concluded that the cards were made between 1465 and 1485. The set was likely made for a wealthy client. Little is known about the games played using cards in the 15th century, but a most likely use would have been gambling. The cards are in very good condition, indicating they were used very little or not at all. The cards may have been manufactured with an intent to never be used conventionally.

The set of cards was up for auction at Hôtel Drouot in Paris, France, on 12 December 1978. In the auction catalogue it was mentioned as an incomplete set of tarot cards dating from the sixteenth century. This is incorrect as the deck is a complete set of playing cards. Harrie Kenter, a Dutch antiques dealer from Amsterdam paid 8,000 Dutch guilder for it, believing it to be an older object.

Kenter kept the set for some years, even cycling with it in his coat pocket through Amsterdam, which his insurance company later prohibited him from doing. Kenter determined it was best to auction off the set after only being able to show the set to others at a secure location at a bank. On 6 December 1983, the set of cards was sold at Sotheby's in London for US$143,000. Kenter was transported to the auction house under a police escort. The Metropolitan Museum of Art bought the set of cards and it is now part of The Cloisters collection.

== Description ==
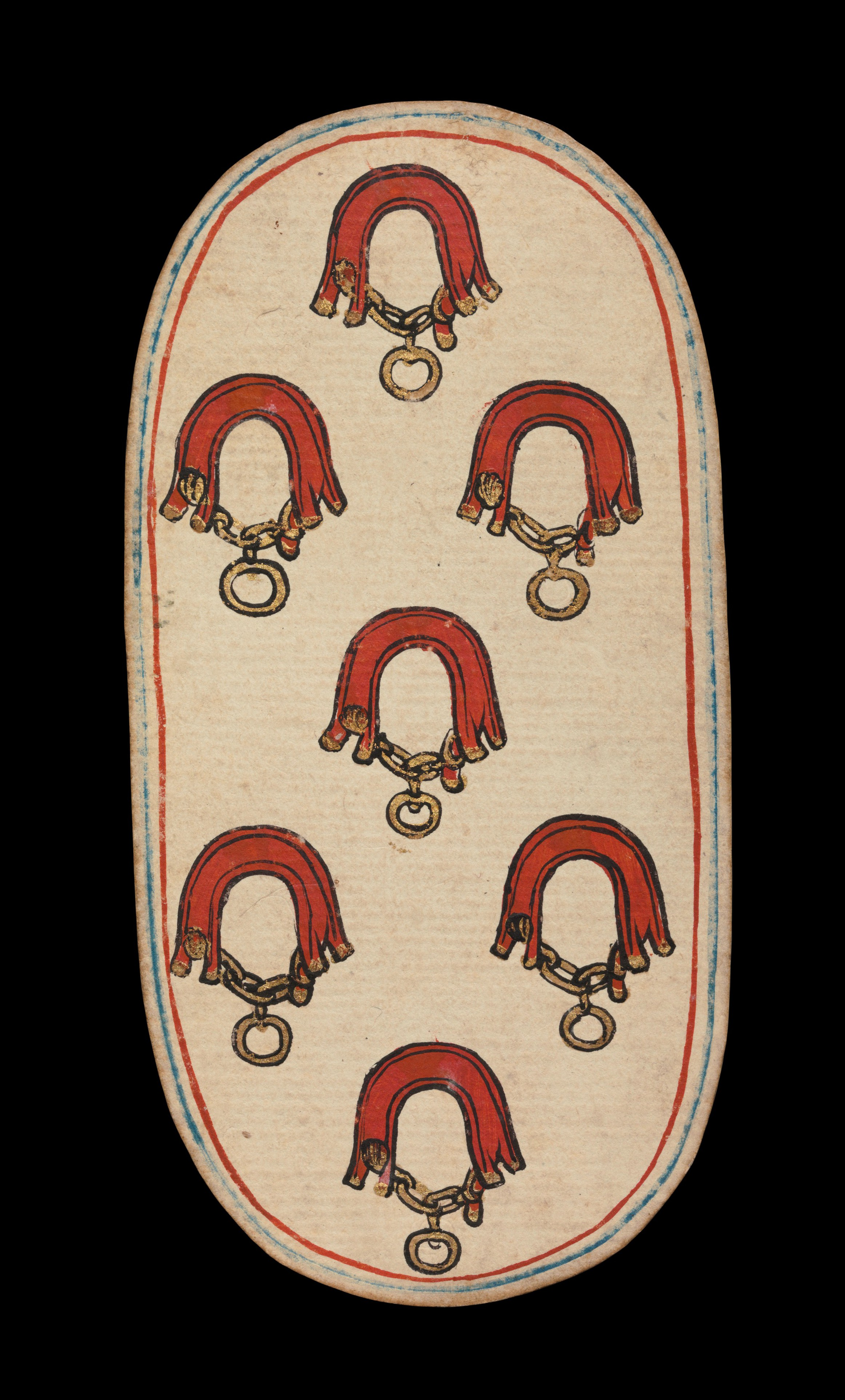
7 of Collars, from The Cloisters Playing Cards, with the red also seen in the horn pip cards MET DP354535

The Flemish Hunting Deck, a deck of playing cards titled Hofjaren Jachtpakket in Dutch, originated from Flanders. The set of cards is a complete regular set of playing cards, consisting of four suits with a king, queen, jack and ten pip cards. The appropriate repetition of the symbol on the card indicate its value. This deck of cards is different from cards today in that it does not include jokers and there are ones instead of the usual aces. It is the only complete set of ordinary playing cards from the fifteenth century. The suits are based on hunting items, consisting of game nooses, hound tethers, horns, and dog collars. This particular deck, due to its bright colors painted on a background of ivory, differs from most cards of its time. The four different types of suits are colored either red or blue; the color red is used for the collars and horns while the color blue is used for the tethers and nooses. The shown figures display fashion of the era, with short jackets, shortly cut hair and pointy shoes. The cards appear rounded on the ends and the backs are not painted. The size of the cards are about four inches by two inches wide. Due to the size remaining the same throughout the different types of cards, the symbols intrude on the border of some of the cards.

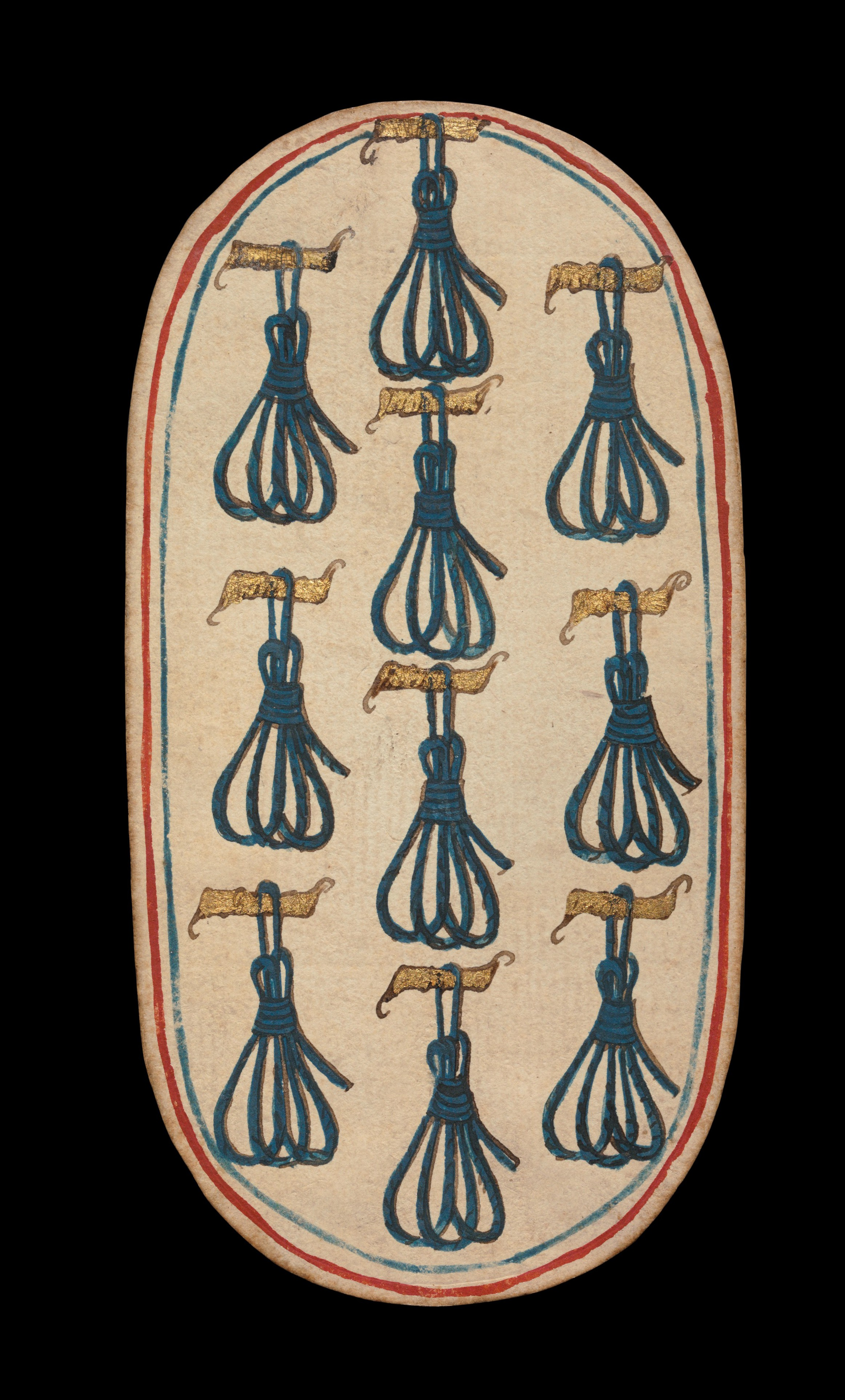
10 of Tethers, from The Cloisters Playing Cards, with the blue also seen in the nooses pip cards MET DP354511

=== Markings ===
There are two different watermarks that can be identified throughout these cards. One of the identified watermarks on the card appears with a Gothic style "p", capped with an ornament, cropped on the edge of the sheets. The fork-tailed "p" can be found in cards such as the 2 of Nooses and the 2 of Dog Collars surrounded by a four-leaf clover shape. The other watermark contains the letters "iado" with the symbolism of a shield. This second watermark can be found in cards such as the 1.5.8 of Dog Collars and some various numbers of the Knave of Nooses and Horns. The first watermark coincides with symbolism found in eastern France and Flanders in the years 1464-1480 while the second seems to be from 1468-1479 southern Flanders and the north Lowlands.

== Manufacturing process ==
Believed to be made with the help of a template, the cards were outlined onto pasteboard and then cut out with shears. To create a stiff thickness to the cards, about three to four pieces of paper were pasted together to create the pasteboards that the cards were drawn onto. After being cut out, the card was overlaid with a smaller template which is evidenced in the line that outlines each card from the edge. Stencils were used to maintain uniformity in reproducing the signs and any irregular placements are evidence that a single stencil was used. The set of cards were sketched using charcoal and marks from a stylus. Ink was then used to fill in the form, along with coloring using medieval pigments. Glazes were used heavily to polish the figures along with silver and gold leaf.

=== Pigments ===
The pigments used to fill in the figures were made with organic materials. The reds come from extracted madder, red ocher, or purpurin. The blue is form azurite or aluminum mordant while the yellow is lead-tin.

== Face cards ==
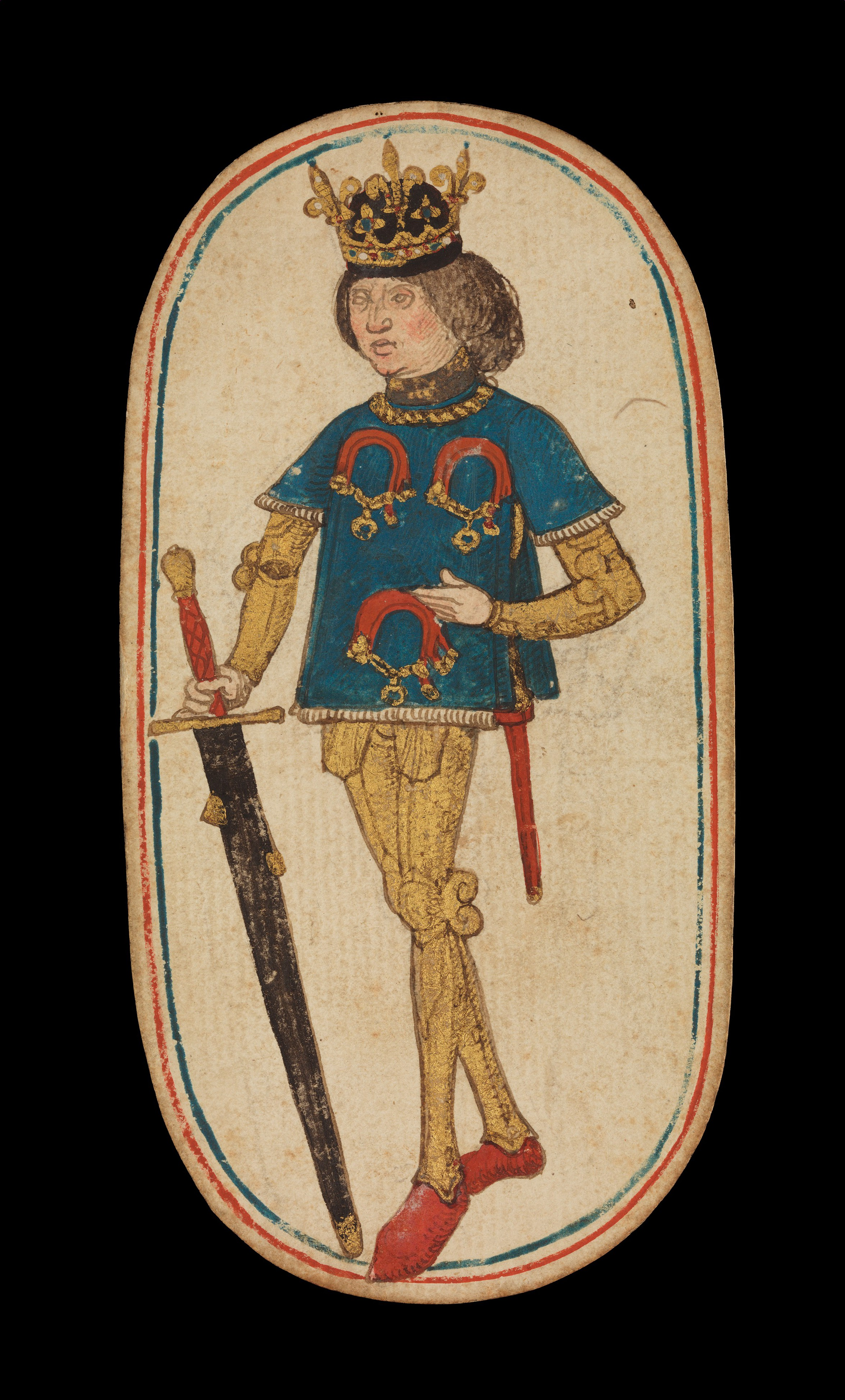
King of Collars, from The Cloisters Playing Cards, with exaggerated fashion from the 15th century MET DP366851

The figures appear with a sketchy style and their presence is heavily dependent on the glazes and other finishes. The figures in the face cards all stand with the same three-quarter profile pose and with a leading foot that reaches beyond the border around the rounded card. Objects are held by the king and queen cards in one hand and the other is raised with unflexed fingers. The Knaves appear slightly different and each wield weapons or object in their hands such as the Knaves of Nooses with a staff, the Knave of Collars with a boar spear, the Knave of Horns with a hunting horn, and the Knave of Tethers with a spiked club. The figures appear with rounded faces, small lips, and circle shapes with dots in the center as eyes, and overall, the facial expressions are very limited.

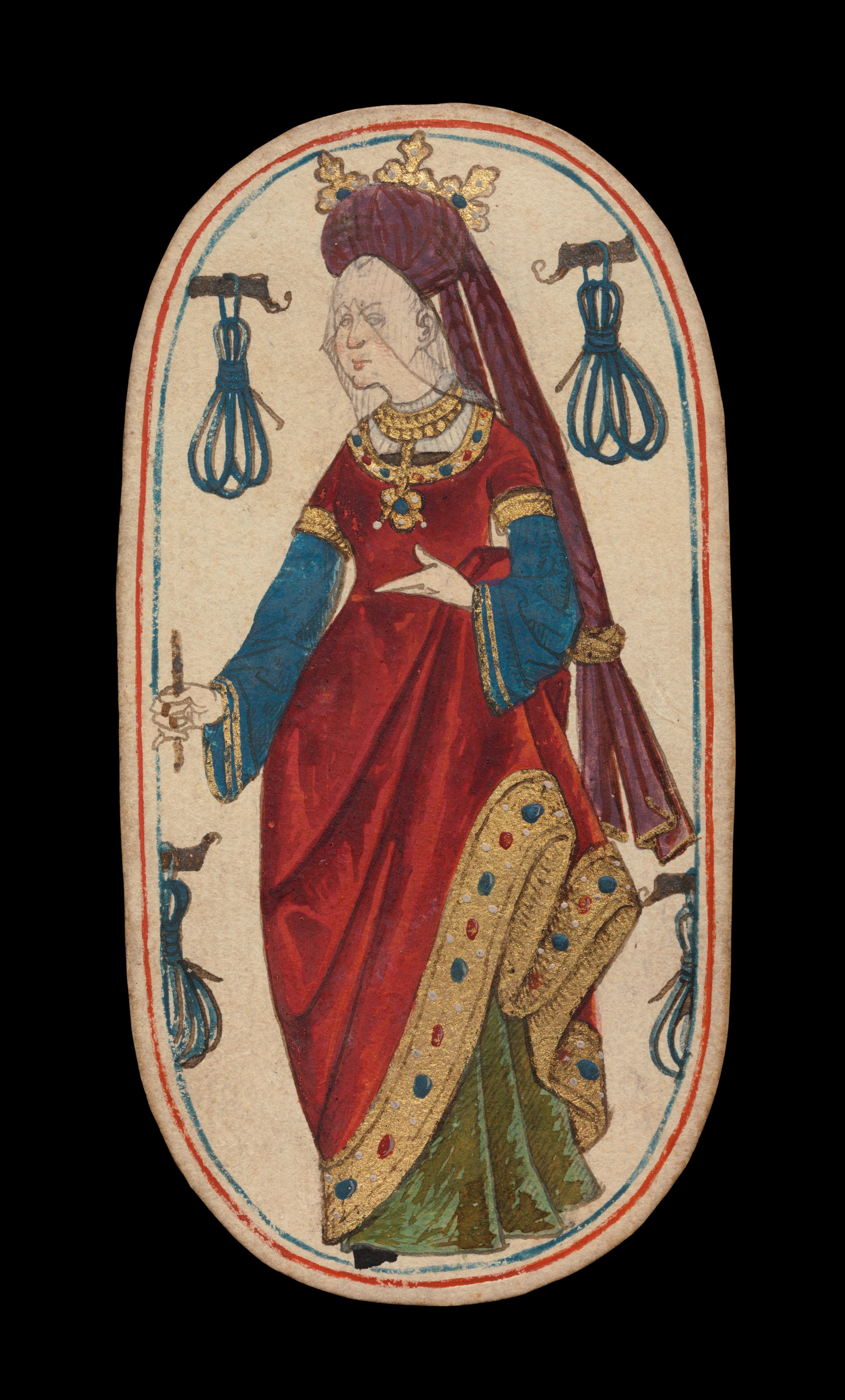
Queen of Tethers, from The Cloisters Playing Cards, with exaggerated fashion from the 15th century MET DP354509

=== Costumes ===
The kings and queens are displayed using gold embroidery, gold jewelry, and gem pendants while the knaves wear costumes according to their different positions of jester, herald, foot soldier, and huntsman. The fashion of the kings and queens is not representative of a singular time or event, but rather, a mix of the different decades of the 15th century. For example, the long gown and narrow sleeves of the King of Horns is what was fashionable in the 1440s, while one brown bootlet and one white was a fashion of the 1470s.

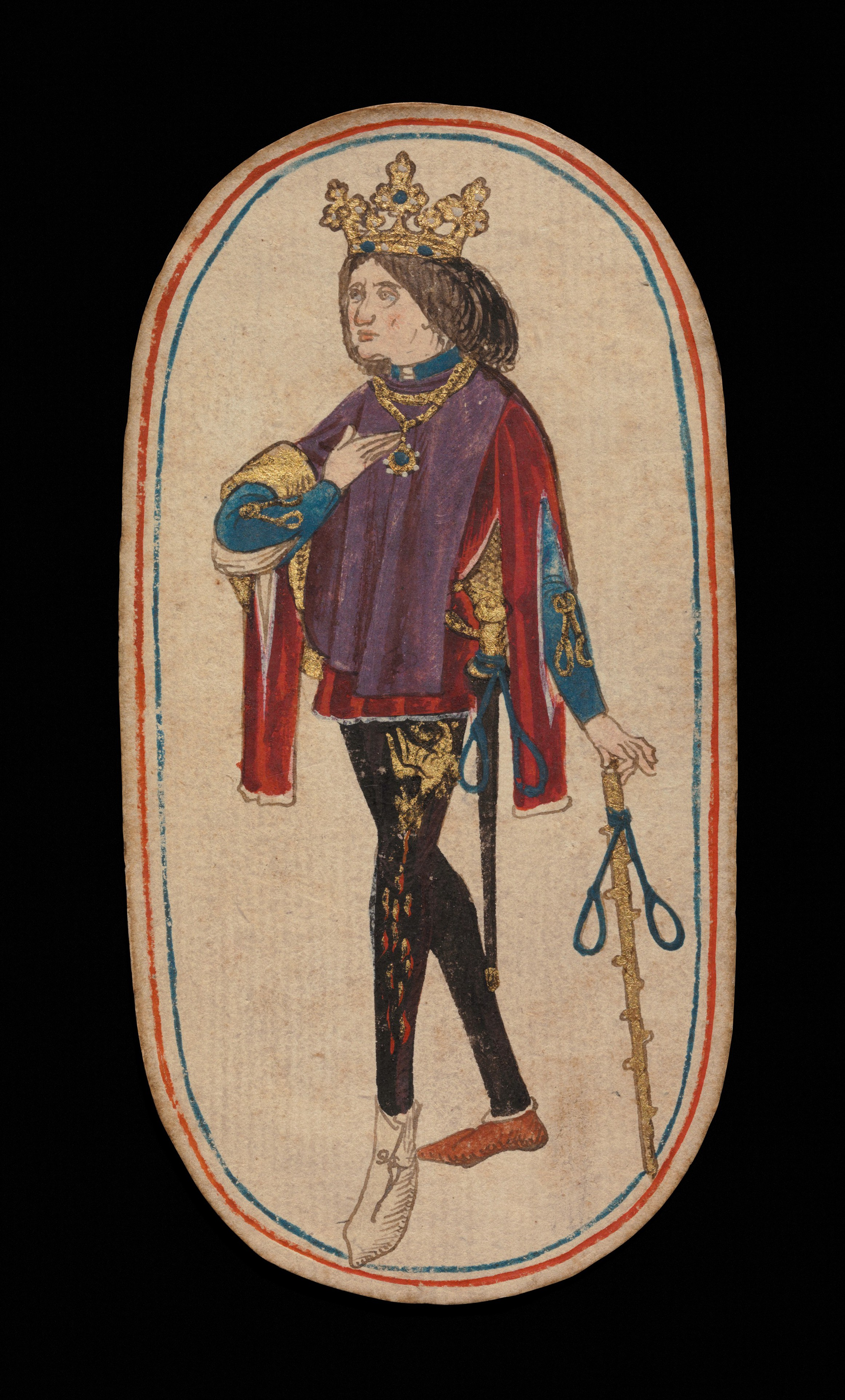
King of Nooses, from The Cloisters Playing Cards with exaggerated fashion from the 15th century MET DP354542

=== Odd details ===
The fashion of the cards do not align with the standards of Burgundian court fashion, as royalty is seen wearing non-royal items, along with various dramatized versions of clothing. The costume of the King of Nooses are associated with that of a courtier than a king. The King of Collars wears items of a knight, such as the emblazoned tabard, instead of attire of a king. The items which are not worn by kings are highly exaggerated, such as the long sleeves of the King of Nooses' attire, and details such as this seem to be poking fun at the idea itself, though it is not confirmed. The cards are perhaps making a statement about the over-the-top fashion of the Burgundian court with the exaggerated clothing, hence the mix-matched yellow and black shoes of the King of Nooses.

== Facsimiles ==
In 1995, Piatnik in conjunction with the Metropolitan Museum of Art produced a facsimile of the Flemish hunting pack as a boxed set with a booklet where they were known as the Flämisches Jagdkartenspiel.

== See also ==
- Ambraser Hofjagdspiel, another 15th-century hunting deck
- Stuttgarter Kartenspiel, another 15th-century hunting deck
