= Politicards =

Deck of playing cards depicting caricatures of political figures

Politicards are a deck of playing cards produced each election year in the United States with 54 caricatures depicting political candidates and prominent political figures. The first Politicards deck was produced in 1971 for the 1972 election by the artist Peter Green, the writer Lee Livingston, the businessman Mike Killeen and the designer Norman Friant. By 2016, about 200,000 packs of cards were being sold during each election cycle. Decks were said to have been used at the time by then New York Senator James Buckley and by the ladies of Mamie Eisenhower's bridge club.

Decks of "Politicards" have been produced for election years 1971, 1980, 1984 and 1996 onwards.

The 1980 and 1984 edition decks were produced by the Washington, D.C. lobbyist Victor Kamber, who purchased the Politicards name in 1979. In 1996, the name expired and was reclaimed by the original artist Peter Green, who has since produced decks for every election through to 2016. Green released an alternative set to the standard 2016 edition titled "Politikids" and depicted political figures as children.
