= International Playing-Card Society =

The International Playing-Card Society (IPCS) is a non-profit organisation for those interested in playing cards, their design, and their history. While many of its members are collectors of playing cards, they also include historians of playing cards and their uses, particularly card games and their history.

The IPCS is based in the United Kingdom, but has members worldwide, especially in Europe. It produces a quarterly journal The Playing-Card, which publishes articles mostly in English but also in French, German, Italian and Spanish. It also publishes occasional monographs called "IPCS Papers", and issues pattern sheets that systematize types of standard playing-card design.

== History ==
The IPCS was founded in 1972, as The Playing-Card Society, with a journal titled The Journal of the Playing-Card Society. In May 1980 the names of the society and the journal were changed, becoming The International Playing-Card Society and The Playing-Card. A newsletter, which became known as Playing-Card World, was formerly published as a supplement to the journal, running for 80 issues from 1975 to 1995.

== Notable members ==
Notable members of the Society are or have included:

- Sylvia Mann, collector of and writer on playing cards, and IPCS founder member and its first president (1972–4).
- Detlef Hoffmann, German game historian, and second president (1974–7)
- Trevor Denning, collector of Spanish playing cards
- Thierry Depaulis, French game historian and president (2017–22)
- Michael Dummett, philosopher, and IPCS founder member and past president (1981–83)
- John McLeod, card game researcher and manager of pagat.com
- Franco Pratesi, Italian scientist and games researcher

== See also ==
- 52 Plus Joker
