= 52 Plus Joker =

- Formation: 1985; 41 years ago
- Founders: Phil Bollhagen; Bob Harrison; Lenny Schneir
- Merger of: Chicago Playing Card Collectors Club
- Type: Nonprofit (501(c)(7))
- Members: ~1,000 (2022)
- President: Lee Asher
- Vice president: Bill Kalush
- Publication: Clear The Decks
- Website: 52plusjoker.org

52 Plus Joker (52+J) is an American non-profit social organization focused on playing cards, founded in 1985 by Phil Bollhagen, Bob Harrison, and Lenny Schneir. The club has about 1,000 members.

In addition to hosting annual conventions, 52 Plus Joker publishes a quarterly newsletter called Clear The Decks, originally created by Bollhagen, and has released a monthly digital magazine called Card Culture since late 2014. The club also produces annual custom playing card decks sold exclusively to members.

52 Plus Joker merged with the Chicago Playing Card Collectors Club in 2018.

The club's founding president was Lenny Schneir. Tom Dawson previously served as president, as did Ray Hartz. As of 2024 the club's president is Lee Asher.

== Annual conventions ==
52 Plus Joker has held conventions annually since 1987.

| Year | Location | Notes |
|---|---|---|
| 1987 | Cincinnati, Ohio | Joint event with the Chicago Playing Card Collectors Club |
| 1988 | Chicago, Illinois | Joint event with the Chicago Playing Card Collectors Club |
| 1989 | Indianapolis, Indiana | Joint event with the Chicago Playing Card Collectors Club |
| 1990 | New Haven, Connecticut | |
| 1991 | Cincinnati, Ohio | Joint event with the Chicago Playing Card Collectors Club |
| 1992 | Las Vegas, Nevada | |
| 1993 | Kissimmee, Florida | |
| 1994 | Arlington, Virginia | |
| 1995 | Cincinnati, Ohio | Joint event with the Chicago Playing Card Collectors Club |
| 1996 | Las Vegas, Nevada | |
| 1997 | Kansas City, Kansas | |
| 1998 | Toronto, Canada | |
| 1999 | Cincinnati, Ohio | |
| 2000 | New Haven, Connecticut | Joint event with the International Playing-Card Society |
| 2001 | Albuquerque, New Mexico | |
| 2002 | Atlanta, Georgia | |
| 2003 | Wilmington, Delaware | Joint event with the Chicago Playing Card Collectors Club |
| 2004 | Milwaukee, Wisconsin | |
| 2005 | San Francisco, California | |
| 2006 | Montreal, Canada | |
| 2007 | Westborough, Massachusetts | |
| 2008 | Las Vegas, Nevada | |
| 2009 | Toronto, Canada | Joint event with the International Playing-Card Society |
| 2010 | New Orleans, Louisiana | |
| 2011 | Denver, Colorado | |
| 2012 | Erlanger, Kentucky | Joint event with the Chicago Playing Card Collectors Club |
| 2013 | Las Vegas, Nevada | |
| 2014 | Charleston, South Carolina | |
| 2015 | Orlando, Florida | |
| 2016 | Chicago, Illinois | |
| 2017 | Erlanger, Kentucky | |
| 2018 | Cleveland, Ohio | |
| 2019 | Charlotte, North Carolina | |
| 2020 | Virtual event due to COVID-19 | |
| 2021 | Virtual event due to COVID-19 | |
| 2022 | Pittsburgh, Pennsylvania | |
| 2023 | Cleveland, Ohio | |
| 2024 | Niagara Falls, New York | |
| 2025 | Charlotte, North Carolina | |

== See also ==
- International Playing-Card Society
