= Transformation playing card =

Type of playing card

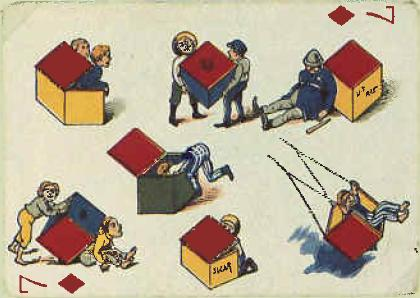
7 of Diamonds from the Vanity Fair deck. United States Playing Card Company

A transformation playing card (sometimes referred to as a transformation deck when assembled into a complete set) is a type of playing card where an artist incorporates the pips of the non-face cards into an artistic design. In a classical transformation playing card, the pips retain their standard position and coloration on the card. In some variations, the pips may be different in size, location or color. There is some debate as to whether these cards, often referred to as semi-transformed, should be considered true transformation playing cards.

== History ==
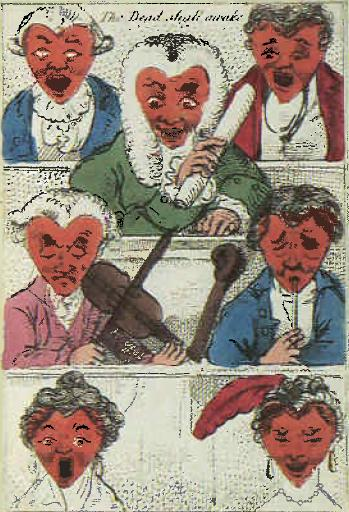
7 of Hearts from Metastasis

By the 19th century, the standard form for playing cards had become fixed in most of Europe and America. French cards used hearts, diamonds, spades and clubs. German cards used acorns, leaves, hearts and bells. It was at this time that designers in Germany, France and England began to draw small figures around the pips.

The first transformation playing cards were created by D.W. Soltan and D. Berger in 1801 as illustrations for a German edition of Hudibras. The cards illustrated were the 2 of hearts, 3 of hearts, 5 of hearts and 8 of hearts. In 1803, John Nixon published the first complete set (52 cards) of transformed cards. Titled Metastasis, this collection was also published as illustrations on sheets of paper. In 1804, J.C. Cotta, a publisher and bookseller in Tübingen, Germany, produced the first set of transformation cards that was published as an actual deck of playing cards. These decks were published as almanacs, in which each of the 52 cards corresponded to one of the 52 weeks of the year.

In 1865, Dean and Son published a deck in which the pips are changed in both size and location, being placed at the artist's whim. Collectors debate as to whether or not this deck should be considered a transformation deck, due to these differences. The Dean and Son deck remained the only deck to manipulate the pips until the 1970s, when the practice gained some popularity. Today, cards that do not strictly adhere to standard pip placement, size and color are referred to as semi-transformation playing cards.

An article entitled "Playing Card Squiggles." was published in the December 1910 issue of Strand Magazine. Several Cotta cards were pictured, erroneously attributed to an unnamed French artist. Strand subsequently asked its readers to submit their own designs for card squiggles, which the magazine periodically published. John Butler Yeats was one of the first to contribute a card design to the magazine. The feature remained popular for some time.

Some have estimated that around 70 different transformation decks were created throughout the entire nineteenth century, which by modern standards is a relatively small number. This period of time also witnessed progression with this art-form. By the late 19th century more colourful and creative transformation decks by Vanity Fair and Harlequin appeared, which showed pips incorporated into artwork that depicted people dining, skating, playing tennis and riding bicycles.

== Contemporary designs ==
Transformation playing cards like Art for the Earth by Friends of the Earth and Under the Sea by the Marine Stewardship Counsel, are created for charity purposes, with different artists contributing art for each card. Similarly, other collective projects like Ultimate Deck from Dan & Dave and Stranger & Stranger or the series from Black Rock Collective brings multiple artists together to create semi-transformation decks.

Three Blind Mice as portrayed on the 3 of Clubs from The Key to the Kingdom

One of the more notable contemporary sets is the award-winning The Key to the Kingdom, a semi-transformation deck commissioned by London's V&A Museum of Childhood and created by Tony Meeuwissen. It won the WH Smith Literary Award for best illustration and The Designers and Art Directory Association of London gold award. This set of cards was created around the theme of nursery rhymes and poems. The cards were sold with a book containing each poem and a picture of the corresponding card on the opposite page. Additionally, the deck was constructed as a puzzle contest laid out in the form of an original poem. The poem gave clues to pick certain cards, which then could be decrypted into a secret message. The prize of $10,000 and a golden key was won by Susan Kavanagh of Essex.

With the advent of Kickstarter and other crowdfunded websites, individual artists are more easily able to bring transformation and semi-transformation decks to the public.

== See also ==
- Minor Arcana
