= Musée Français de la Carte à Jouer =

Museum in Paris, France

Coordinates: 48°49′22″N 2°16′24″E

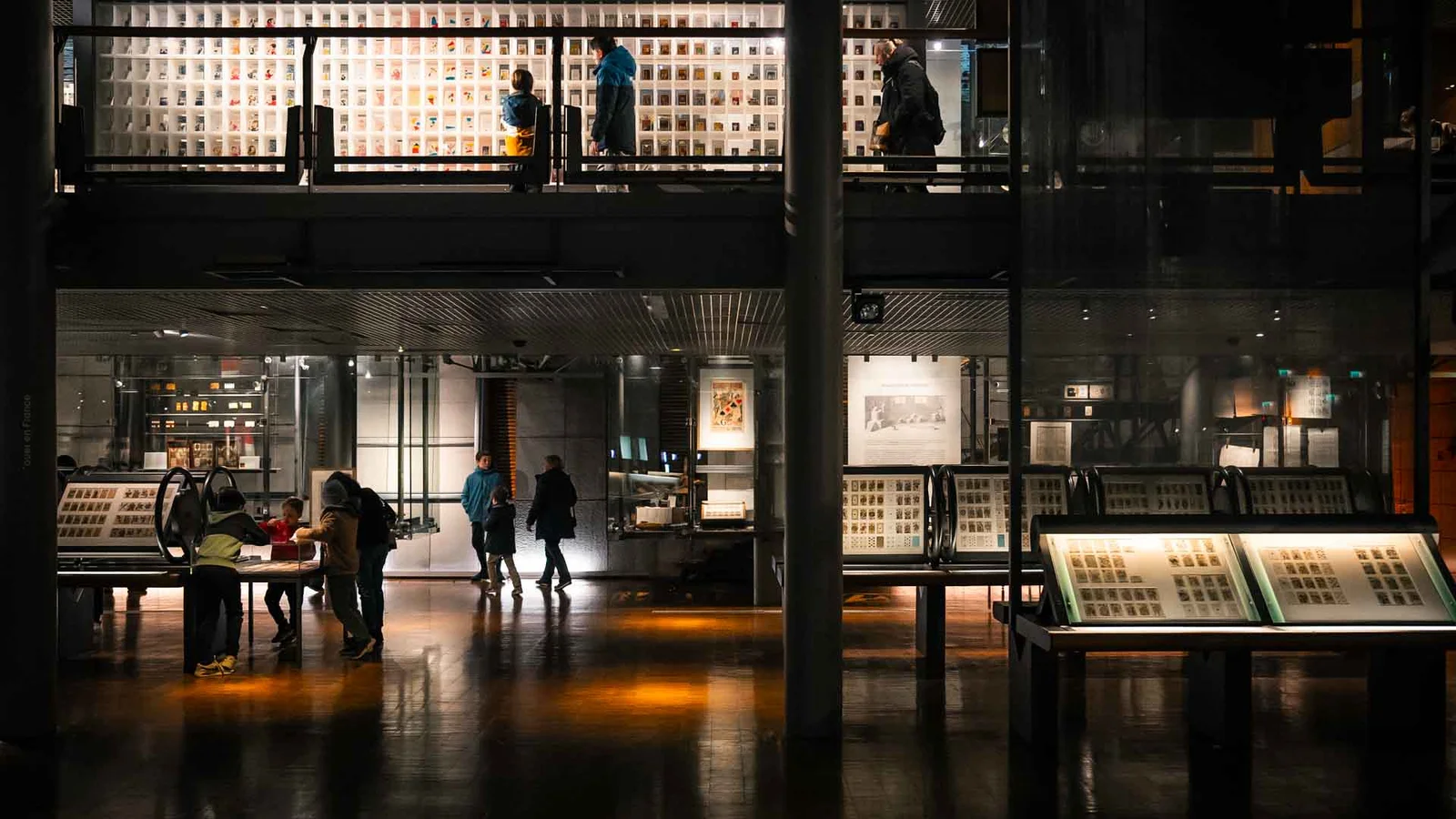
Interior view of the Musée Français de la Carte à Jouer in Issy-les-Moulineaux, France.

The Musée Français de la Carte à Jouer (French pronunciation: [myze fʁɑ̃sɛ də la kaʁt a ʒwe]) is a museum of playing cards in Paris, France. It is located at 16, rue Auguste Gervais, in the suburb of Issy-les-Moulineaux. Nearby is Mairie d'Issy station, the southern terminus of Paris Métro Line 12. The museum is open Wednesdays through Sundays, and an admission fee is charged.

The museum was established in 1986 based on the collections of Louis Chardonneret (1849–1935) and Robert Thissen, and since 1997 has occupied its current location in the former Château d'Issy of the Princes of Conti.

It contains about 9000 objects, including nearly 6500 playing cards, 980 etchings, drawings, and posters, and more than other 1000 objects related to card games. It also presents temporary exhibitions. Other galleries tell the story of Issy-les-Moulineaux and the chateau of the Princes of Conti, the beginnings of aviation, and noted artists associated with Issy (Auguste Rodin, Henri Matisse, and Jean Dubuffet).

The museum won the 1999 European Museum of the Year Award.

== See also ==
- List of museums in Paris
