= Jerry's Nugget playing cards =

Collectible casino playing cards

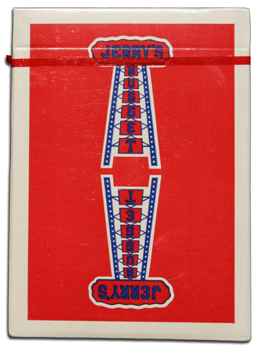
A red deck of Jerry's Nugget playing cards

In 1970, the Jerry's Nugget Casino in Las Vegas, Nevada, printed a special deck of playing cards that was not used in their casino, but was sold in their gift shop for fifty cents each. These decks have become highly desired by collectors due to their unique handling qualities, and more than fifty years later they now fetch upwards of $500 per deck on the second-hand market.

The signature design of the card backs shows an image of the oil derrick sign from the parking lot of the casino, set against a solid blue or red background. This sign also appears on the deck's joker.

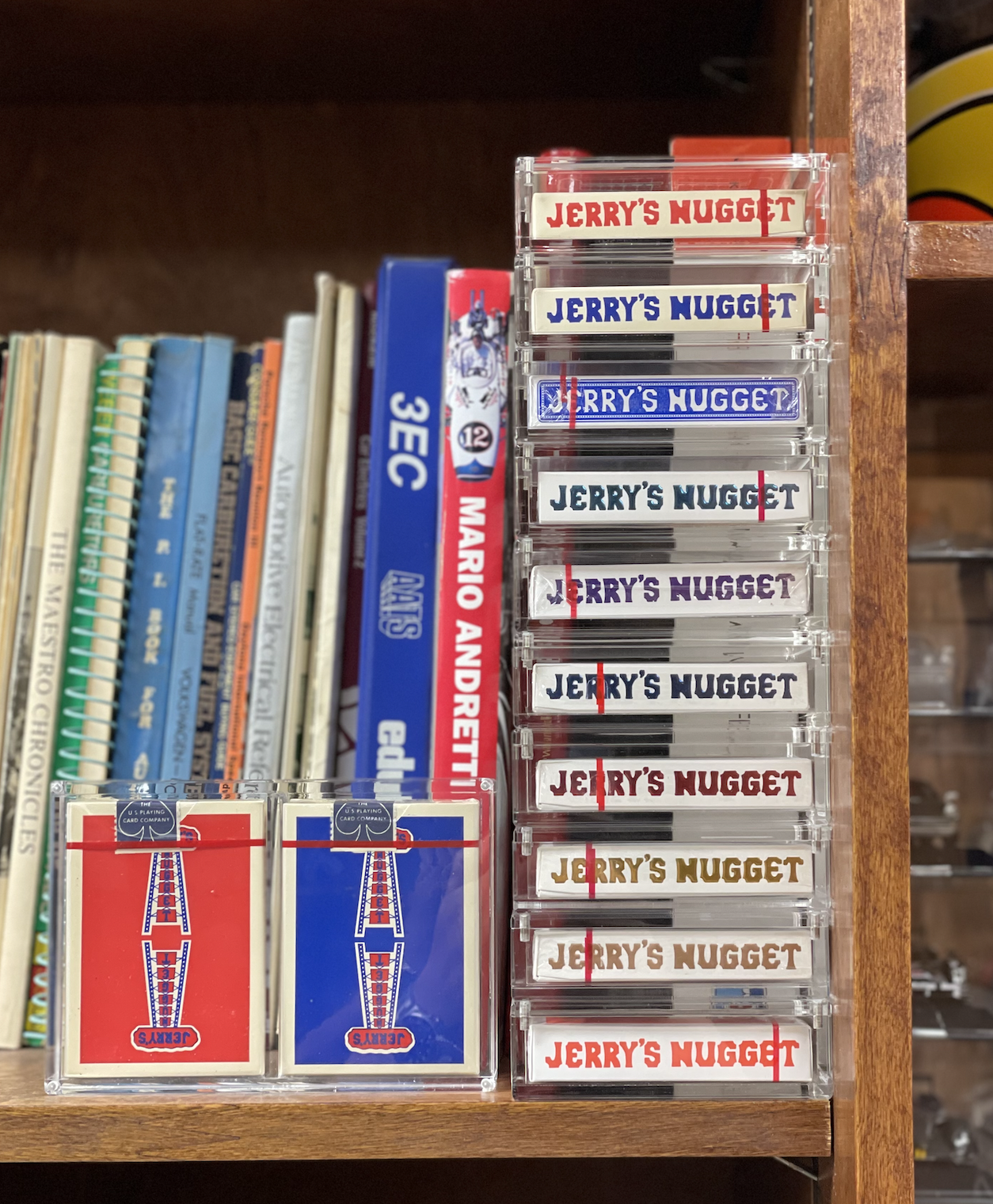
Original through modern 2021 Jerry's Nugget Casino Playing cards

== History ==
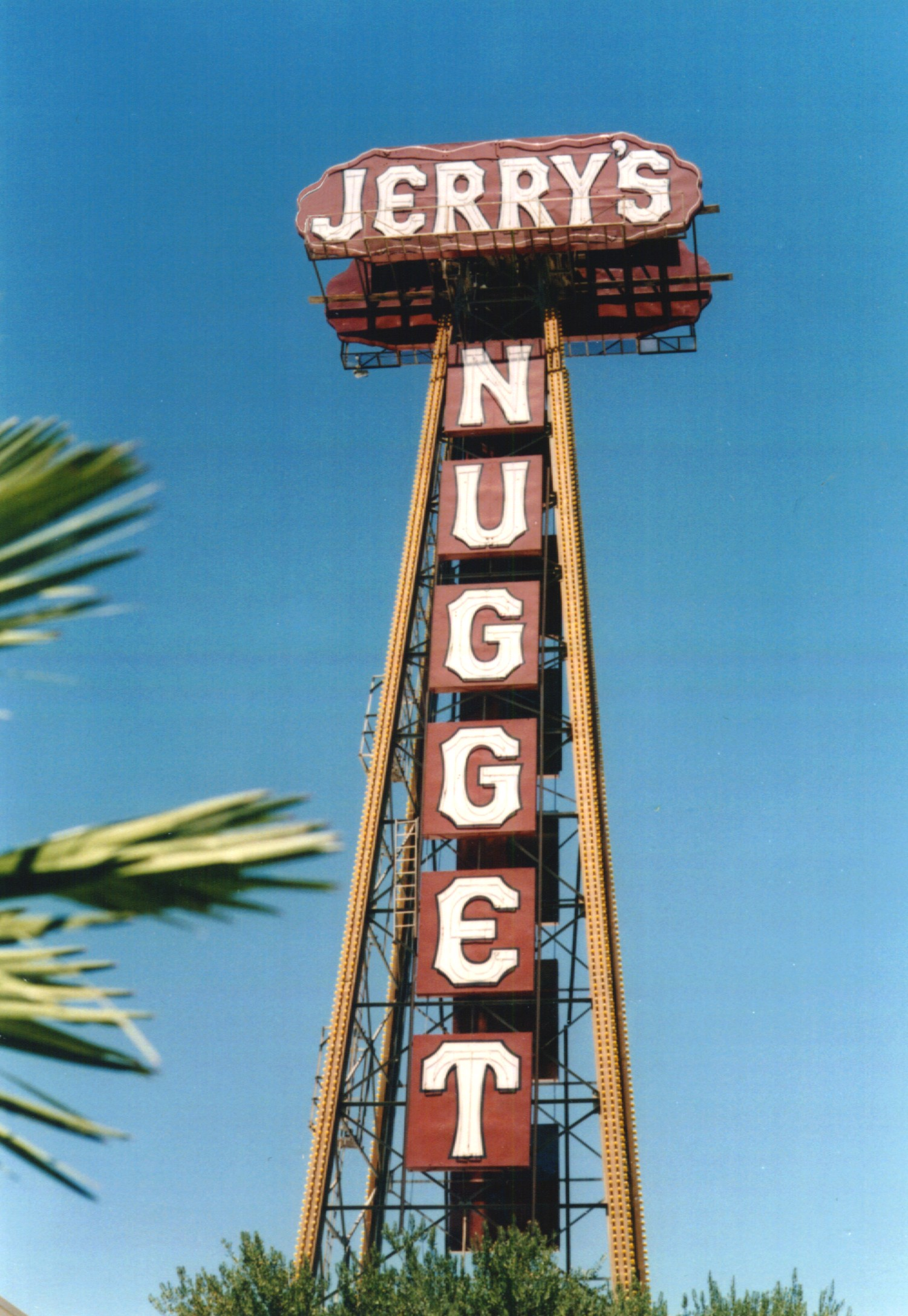
Jerry's Nugget Casino, North Las Vegas, Nevada

Jerry's Nugget playing cards were printed in Cincinnati, Ohio, and then were driven to the North Las Vegas casino via trucks where they sat in storage for many years. The playing cards eventually sold out around 1999, after famous French magician and private collector Dominique Duvivier purchased the remaining stock of about 14,000 decks.

== Recreation ==
In 2019, as a result of a collaboration between Expert Playing Card Company and Jerry's Nugget Casino, a successful project was launched to recreate the decks in a modern finish and a vintage finish. Reprintings of the Jerry's Nugget design have since been released in multiple colours.

== See also ==
- Cardistry
- Sleight of hand
