= Playing card =

Card used for playing various card games

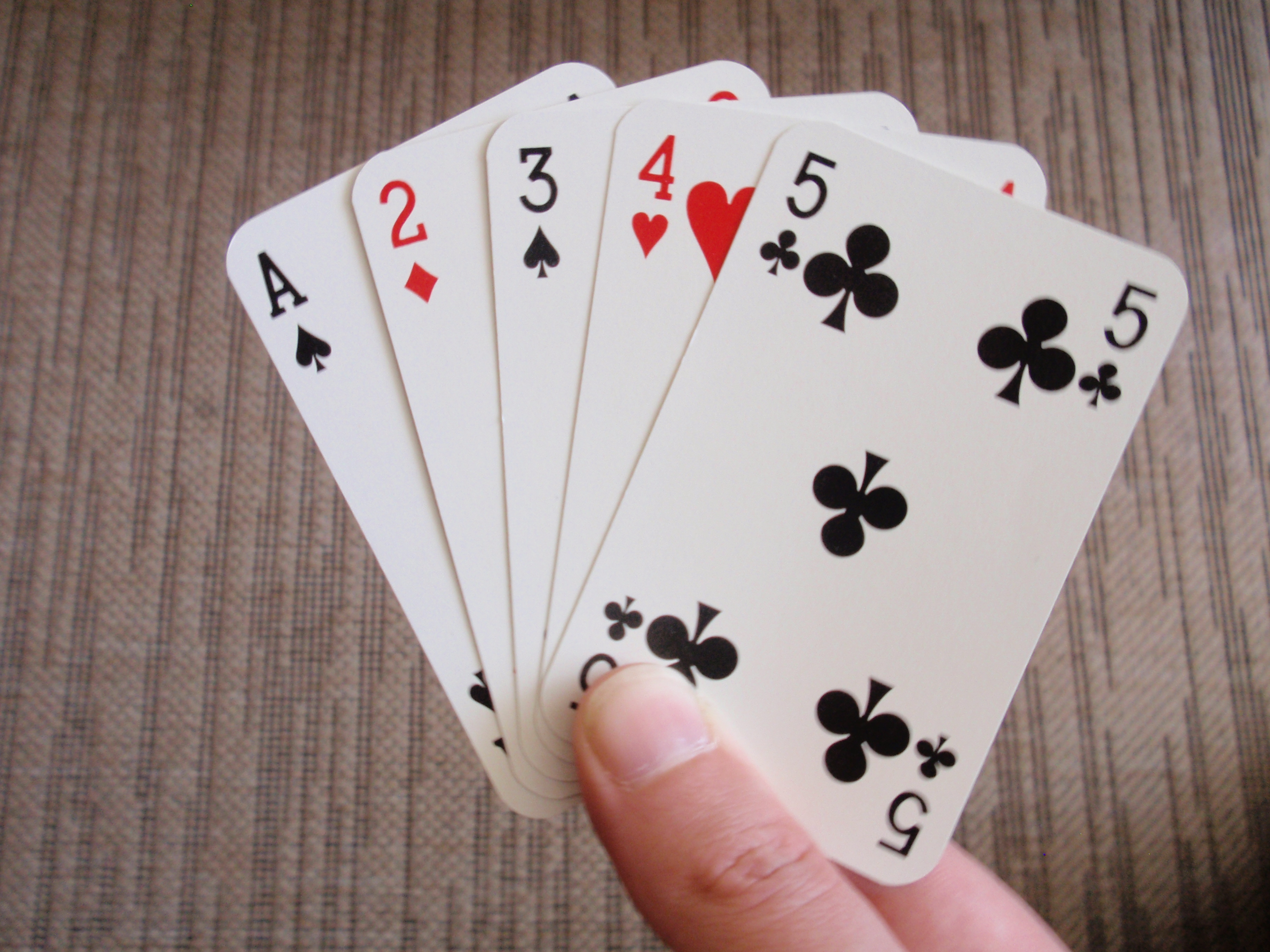
Hand of French-suited cards

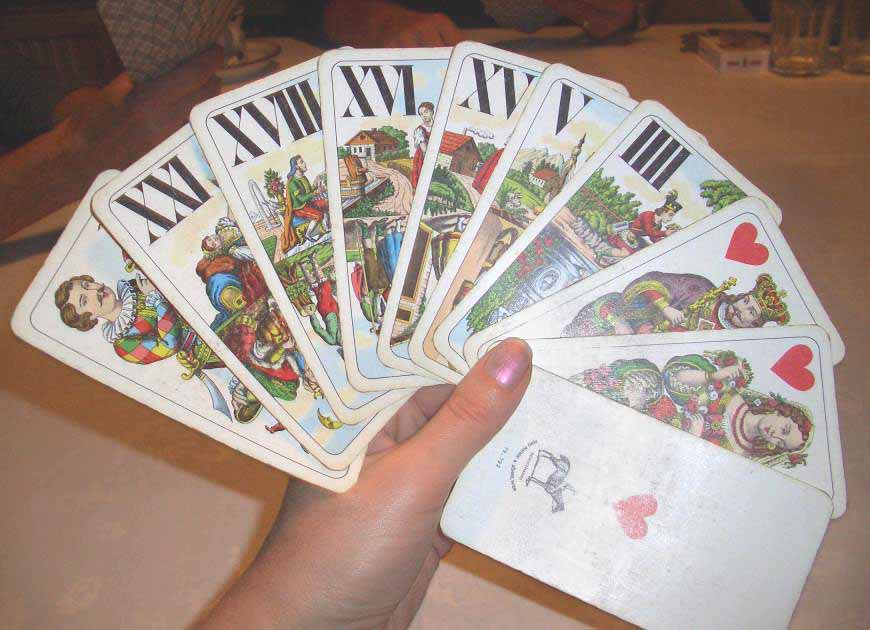
Tarot playing cards from Austria

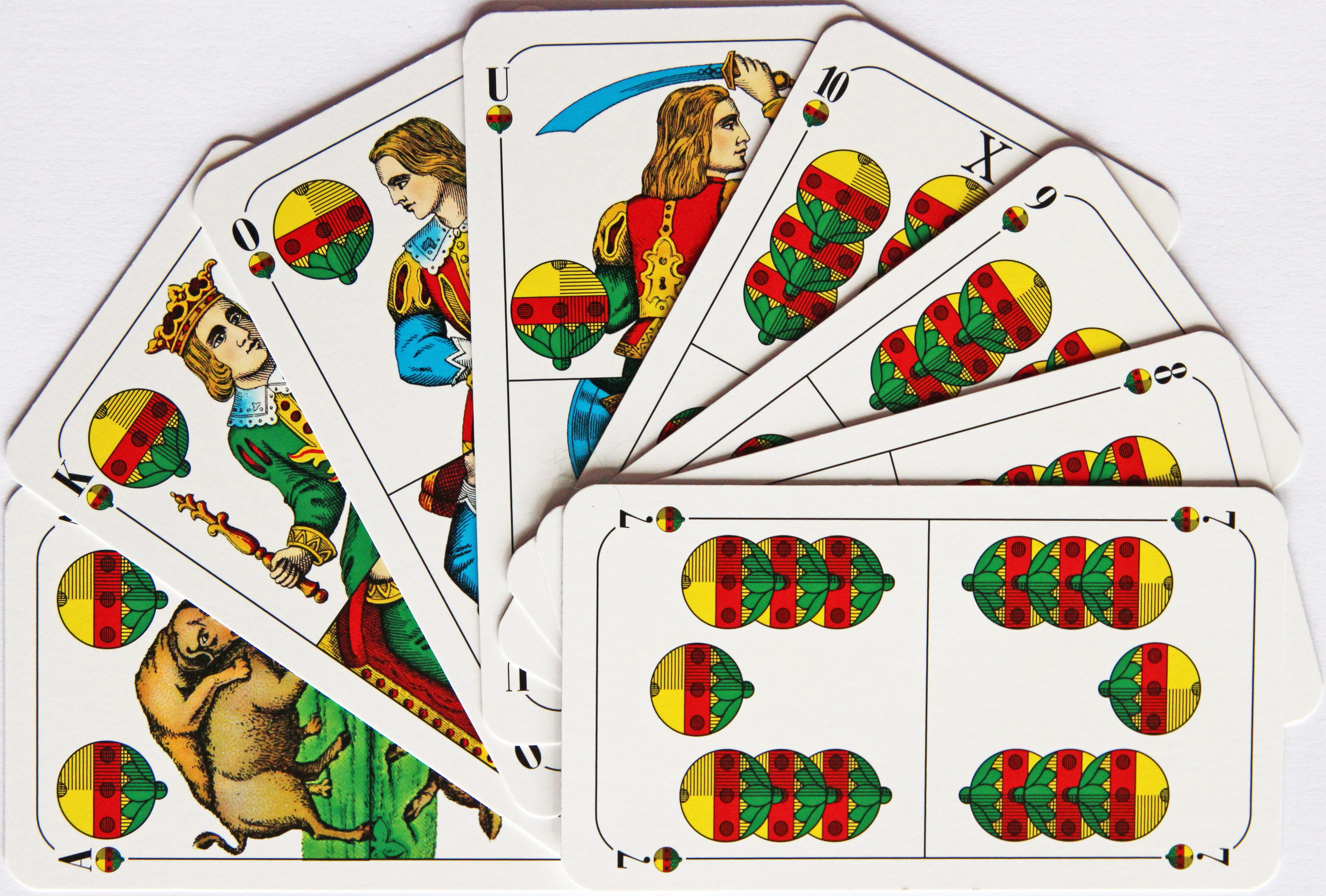
Suit of Bells from a Bavarian pack

A playing card is a piece of specially prepared card stock, heavy paper, thin cardboard, plastic-coated paper, cotton-paper blend, or thin plastic that is marked with distinguishing motifs. Often the front (face) and back of each card has a finish to make handling easier. They are most commonly used for playing card games, and are also used in magic tricks, cardistry, card throwing, and card houses; cards may also be collected. Playing cards are typically palm-sized for convenient handling, and usually are sold together in a set as a deck of cards or pack of cards.

The most common type of playing card in the West is the French-suited, standard 52-card deck, of which the most widespread design is the English pattern, (Note: Also called the International or Anglo-American pattern, but 'English pattern' is the name recommended by the International Playing-Card Society.) followed by the Belgian-Genoese pattern. However, many countries use other, traditional types of playing card, including those that are German, Italian, Spanish and Swiss-suited. Tarot cards (also known locally as Tarocks or tarocchi) are an old genre of playing card that is still very popular in France, central and Eastern Europe and Italy. Customised tarot card decks are also used for divination; including tarot card reading and cartomancy. Asia, too, has regional cards such as the Japanese hanafuda, Chinese money-suited cards, or Indian ganjifa. The reverse side of the card is often covered with a pattern that will make it difficult for players to look through the translucent material to read other people's cards or to identify cards by minor scratches or marks on their backs.

Playing cards are available in a wide variety of styles, as decks may be custom-produced for competitions, casinos and magicians (sometimes in the form of trick decks), made as promotional items, or intended as souvenirs, artistic works, educational tools, or branded accessories. Decks of cards or even single cards are also collected as a hobby or for monetary value.

== History ==
=== China ===
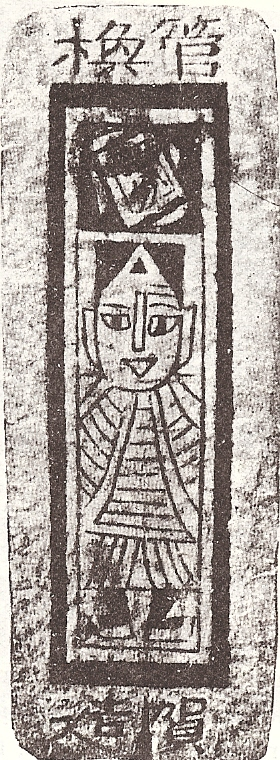
Chinese printed playing card c. 1400 AD found near Turpan

Playing cards were most likely invented during the Tang dynasty around the 9th century, as a result of the usage of woodblock printing technology. The reference to a leaf game in a 9th-century text known as the Collection of Miscellanea at Duyang (Chinese: 杜阳杂编; pinyin: Dùyáng zábiān), written by Tang dynasty writer Su E, is often cited in connection to the existence of playing cards. However the connection between playing cards and the leaf game is disputed. The reference describes Princess Tongchang, daughter of Emperor Yizong of Tang, playing the "leaf game" in 868 with members of the Wei clan, the family of the princess's husband. The first known book on the "leaf" game was called the Yezi Gexi and allegedly written by a Tang woman. It received commentary by writers of subsequent dynasties. The Song dynasty (960–1279) scholar Ouyang Xiu (1007–1072) asserts that the "leaf" game existed at least since the mid-Tang dynasty and associated its invention with the development of printed sheets as a writing medium. However, Ouyang also claims that the "leaves" were pages of a book used in a board game played with dice, and that the rules of the game were lost by 1067.

Other games revolving around alcoholic drinking involved using playing cards of a sort from the Tang dynasty onward. However, these cards did not contain suits or numbers. Instead, they were printed with instructions or forfeits for whoever drew them.

The earliest dated instance of a game involving cards occurred on 17 July 1294 when the Ming Department of Punishments caught two gamblers, Yan Sengzhu and Zheng Zhugou, (Note: "Zhugou" is literally "pig-dog", possibly rendered as such because of a naming taboo.) playing with paper cards. Wood blocks for printing the cards were impounded, together with nine of the cards.

William Henry Wilkinson suggests that the first cards may have been actual paper currency which doubled as both the tools of gaming and the stakes being played for, similar to trading card games. Using paper money was inconvenient and risky so they were substituted by play money known as "money cards". One of the earliest games in which we know the rules is madiao, a trick-taking game, which dates to the Ming Dynasty (1368–1644). Fifteenth-century scholar Lu Rong described it as being played with 38 "money cards" divided into four suits: 9 in coins, 9 in strings of coins (which may have been misinterpreted as sticks from crude drawings), 9 in myriads (of coins or of strings), and 11 in tens of myriads (a myriad is 10,000). The two latter suits had Water Margin characters instead of pips on them with Chinese to mark their rank and suit. The suit of coins is in reverse order with 9 of coins being the lowest going up to 1 of coins as the high card.

=== Persia ===
Despite the wide variety of different patterns, the suits show a uniformity of structure. Every suit contains twelve cards with the top two usually being the court cards of king and vizier and the bottom ten being pip cards. Some decks can contain 8 suits to make a 96-card deck, like the deck for Ganjifa. Half the suits use reverse ranking for their pip cards. There are many motifs for the suit pips but some include coins, clubs, jugs, and swords which resemble later Mamluk and Latin suits. Michael Dummett speculated that Mamluk cards may have descended from an earlier deck which consisted of 48 cards divided into four suits each with ten pip cards and two court cards.

=== Egypt ===
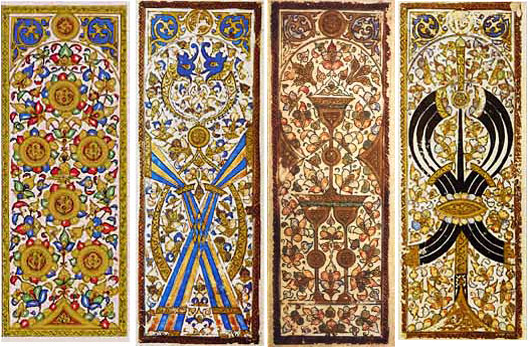
Four Mamluk playing cards

By the 11th century, playing cards were spreading throughout the Asian continent and later came into Egypt. The oldest surviving cards in the world are four fragments found in the Keir Collection and one in the Benaki Museum. (Note: The designation of "oldest surviving cards" is complicated by the forms of the historical objects: Some may be less "card-like" and more akin to scaps of parchment.) They are dated to the 12th and 13th centuries (late Fatimid, Ayyubid, and early Mamluk periods).

A near complete pack of Mamluk playing cards dating to the 15th century, and of similar appearance to the fragments above, was discovered by Leo Aryeh Mayer in the Topkapı Palace, Istanbul, in 1939. It is not a complete set and is actually composed of three different packs, probably to replace missing cards. The Topkapı pack originally contained 52 cards comprising four suits: polo-sticks, coins, swords, and cups. Each suit contained ten pip cards and three court cards, called malik (king), nā'ib malik (viceroy or deputy king), and thānī nā'ib (second or under-deputy). The thānī nā'ib is a non-existent title so it may not have been in the earliest versions; without this rank, the Mamluk suits would structurally be the same as a Ganjifa suit. In fact, the word "Kanjifah" appears in Arabic on the king of swords and is still used in parts of the Middle East to describe modern playing cards. Influence from further east can explain why the Mamluks, most of whom were Central Asian Turkic Kipchaks, called their cups tuman, which means "myriad" (10,000) in the Turkic, Mongolian, and Jurchen languages. Wilkinson postulated that the cups may have been derived from inverting the Chinese and Jurchen ideogram for "myriad", 万, which was pronounced as something like man in Middle Chinese.

The Mamluk court cards showed abstract designs or calligraphy not depicting persons possibly due to religious proscription in Sunni Islam, though they did bear the ranks on the cards. Nā'ib would be borrowed into French (nahipi), Italian (naibi), and Spanish (naipes), the latter word still in common usage. Panels on the pip cards in two suits show they had a reverse ranking, a feature found in madiao, ganjifa, and old European card games like ombre, tarot, and maw. A fragment of two uncut sheets of Moorish-styled cards of a similar was found in Spain and dated to the early 15th century.

Export of these cards (from Cairo, Alexandria, and Damascus), ceased after the fall of the Mamluks in the 16th century. The rules to play these games are lost but they are believed to be plain trick games without trumps.

=== Spread across Europe and early design changes ===
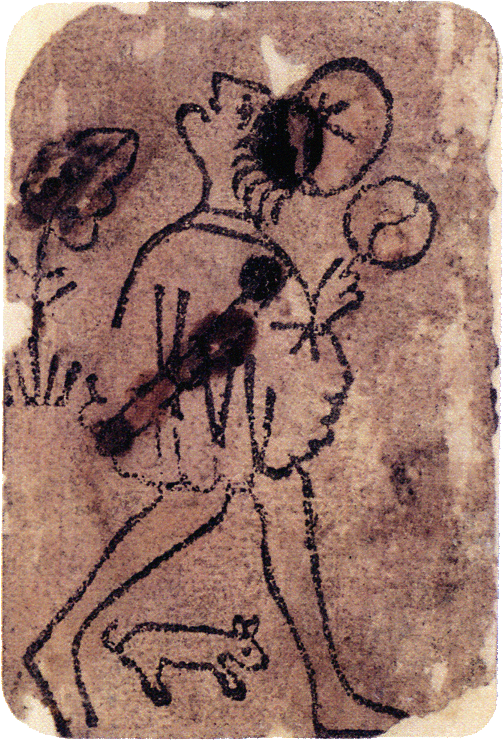
Knave of Coins from the oldest known European deck (c. 1390–1410)

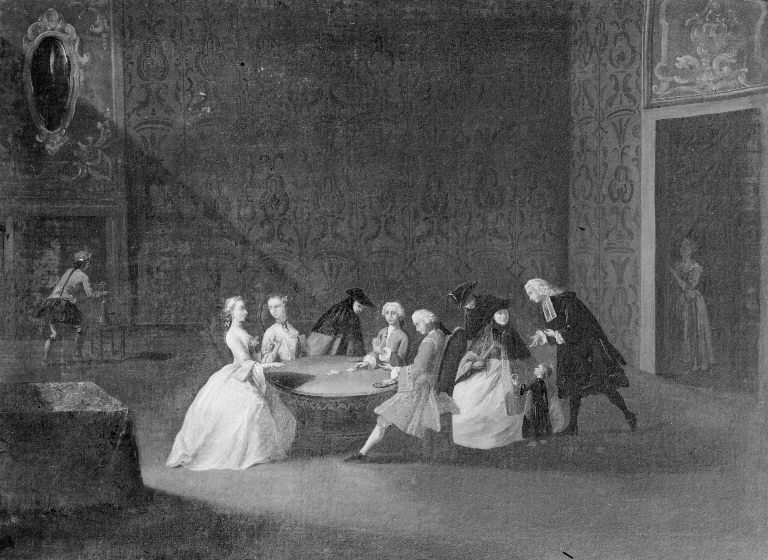
Card players in 18th Century Venice, by Pietro Longhi

Playing cards probably came to Europe from the East, specifically those used by the Mamluks in Egypt, and probably arrived first in Spain since the earliest European mention of playing cards appears in 1371 in a Catalan language rhyme dictionary which lists naip among words ending in -ip. According to Trevor Denning, the only attested meaning of this Catalan word is "playing card". This suggests that cards may have been "reasonably well known" in Catalonia at that time, perhaps introduced as a result of maritime trade with the Mamluk rulers of Egypt.

The earliest record of playing cards in central Europe is believed by some researchers to be a ban on card games in the city of Bern in 1367, but this source is disputed as the earliest copy available dates to 1398 and may have been amended. Generally accepted as the first Italian reference is a Florentine ban dating to 1377. Also appearing in 1377 was the treatise by John of Rheinfelden, in which he describes playing cards and their moral meaning. From this year onwards more and more records (usually bans) of playing cards occur, first appearing in England as early as 1413.

Among the early patterns of playing card were those derived from the Mamluk suits of cups, coins, swords, and polo sticks, which are still used in traditional Latin decks. As polo was an obscure sport to Europeans then, the polo-sticks became batons or cudgels. In addition to Catalonia in 1371, the presence of playing cards is attested in 1377 in Switzerland, and 1380 in many locations including Florence and Paris. Wide use of playing cards in Europe can, with some certainty, be traced from 1377 onward.

In the account books of Johanna, Duchess of Brabant and Wenceslaus I, Duke of Luxembourg, an entry dated May 14, 1379, by receiver general of Brabant Renier Hollander reads: "Given to Monsieur and Madame four peters and two florins, worth eight and a half sheep, for the purchase of packs of cards". In his book of accounts for 1392 or 1393, Charles or Charbot Poupart, treasurer of the household of Charles VI of France, records payment for the painting of three sets of cards.

From about 1418 to 1450 professional card makers in Ulm, Nuremberg, and Augsburg created printed decks. Playing cards even competed with devotional images as the most common uses for woodcuts in this period. Most early woodcuts of all types were coloured after printing, either by hand or, from about 1450 onwards, stencils. These 15th-century playing cards were probably painted. The Flemish Hunting Deck, held by the Metropolitan Museum of Art, is the oldest complete set of ordinary playing cards made in Europe from the 15th century.

As cards spread from Italy to Germanic countries, the Latin suits were replaced with the suits of leaves (or shields), hearts (or roses), bells, and acorns. France initially used Latin-suited cards and the Aluette pack used today in western France may be a relic of that time, but around 1480, French card manufacturers, perhaps in order to facilitate mass production, went over to very much simplified versions of the German suit symbols. A combination of Latin and Germanic suit pictures and names resulted in the French suits of trèfles (clovers), carreaux (tiles), cœurs (hearts), and piques (pikes) around 1480. The trèfle (clover) was probably derived from the acorn and the pique (pike) from the leaf of the German suits. The names pique and spade, however, may have derived from the sword (spade) of the Italian suits. In England, the French suits were eventually used, although the earliest packs circulating may have had Latin suits. This may account for why the English called the clovers "clubs" and the pikes "spades".

In the late 14th century, Europeans changed the Mamluk court cards to represent European royalty and attendants. In a description from 1377, the earliest courts were originally a seated "king", an upper marshal that held his suit symbol up, and a lower marshal that held it down. The latter two correspond with the Ober and Unter cards still found today in German and Swiss playing cards. The Italians and Iberians replaced the Ober/Unter system with the "Knight" and "Fante" or "Sota" before 1390, perhaps to make the cards more visually distinguishable.

In England, the lowest court card was called the "knave" which originally meant male child (compare German Knabe), so in this context the character could represent the "prince", son to the king and queen; the meaning servant developed later. Queens appeared sporadically in packs as early as 1377, especially in Germany. Although the Germans abandoned the queen before the 1500s, the French permanently picked it up and placed it under the king.

In 1628, the Mystery of Makers of Playing Cards of the City of London (now the Worshipful Company of Makers of Playing Cards) was incorporated under a royal charter by Charles I; the Company received livery status from the Court of Aldermen of the City of London in 1792. The Company still exists today, having expanded its member ranks to include "card makers... card collectors, dealers, bridge players, [and] magicians".

During the mid 16th century, Portuguese traders introduced playing cards to Japan. The first indigenous Japanese deck was the Tenshō karuta named after the Tenshō period.

=== Later design changes ===
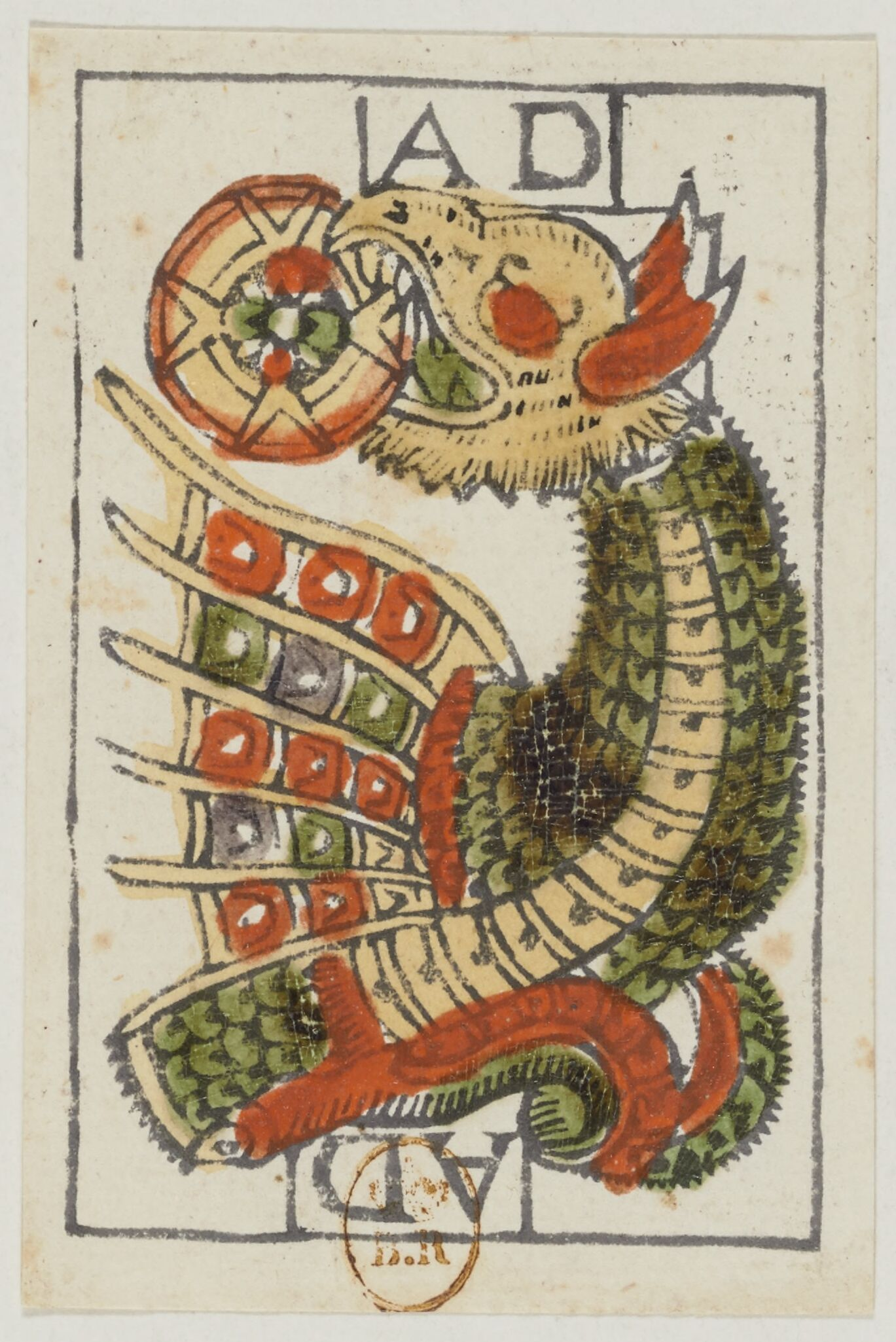
Card from a deck showing edge indices, 1693

Packs with corner and edge indices (i.e. the value of the card printed at the corner(s) or edges of the card) enabled players to hold their cards close together in a fan with one hand (instead of the two hands previously used). An early example of a pack with edge indices and Latin suits was printed by Infirerra and dated 1693. However, this feature was commonly used only from the end of the 18th century. The first American-manufactured (French) deck with this innovation was the Saladee's Patent, printed by Samuel Hart in 1864. In 1870, he and his cousins at Lawrence & Cohen followed up with the Squeezers, the first cards with indices that had a large diffusion.

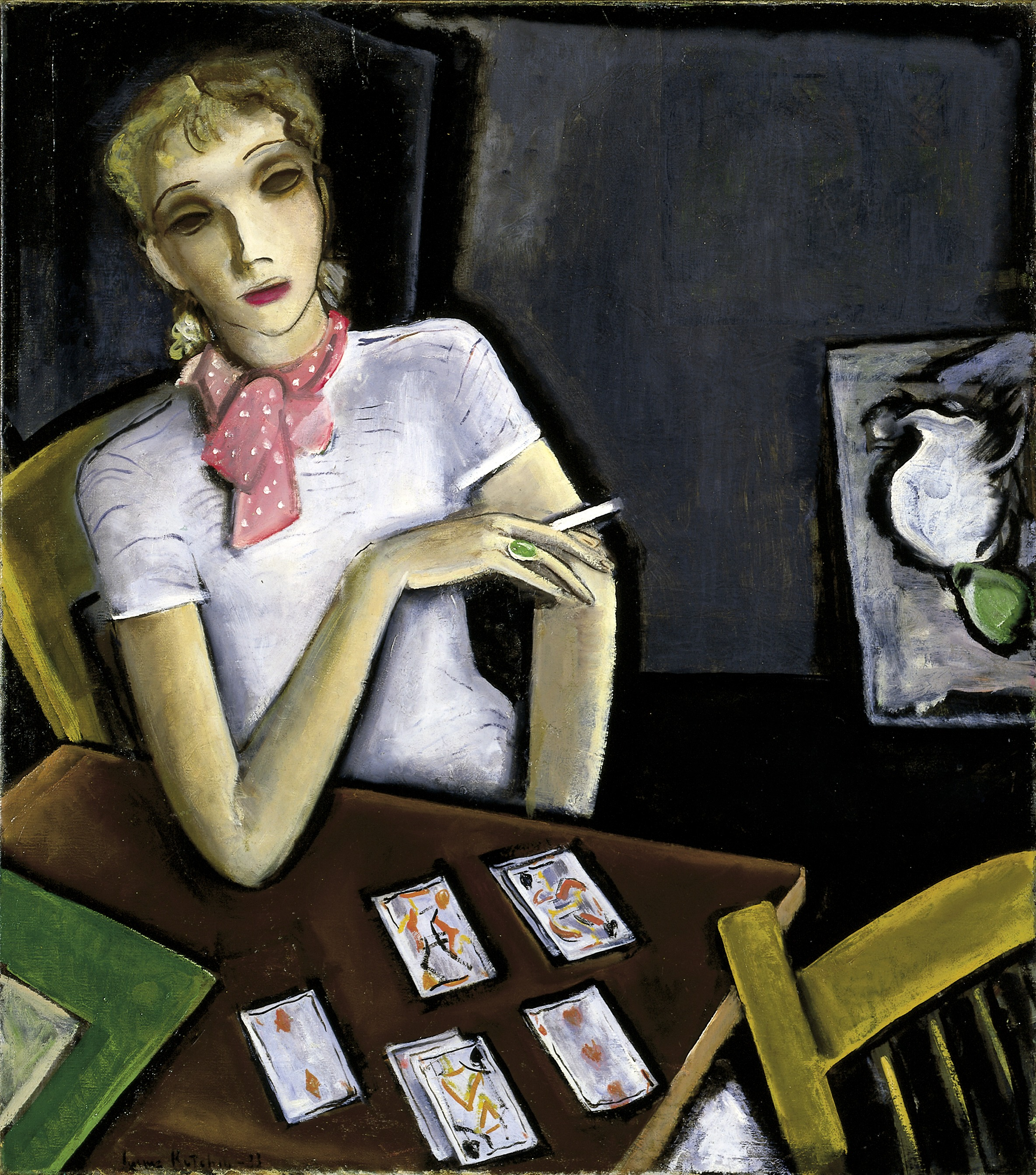
Girl with Cards by Lucius Kutchin, 1933, Smithsonian American Art Museum

This was followed by the innovation of reversible court cards. This invention is attributed to a French card maker of Agen in 1745. But the French government, which controlled the design of playing cards, prohibited the printing of cards with this innovation. In central Europe (Trappola cards) and Italy (Tarocco Bolognese) the innovation was adopted during the second half of the 18th century. In Great Britain, the pack with reversible court cards was patented in 1799 by Edward Ludlow and Ann Wilcox. Not being registered card-makers, they worked with printer Thomas Wheeler to produce a French-suited pack using this patent, which was first sold in 1801.

Sharp corners wear out more quickly, and could possibly reveal the card's value, so they were replaced with rounded corners. Before the mid-19th century, British, American, and French players preferred blank backs. The need to hide wear and tear and to discourage writing on the back led cards to have designs, pictures, photos, or advertising on the reverse.

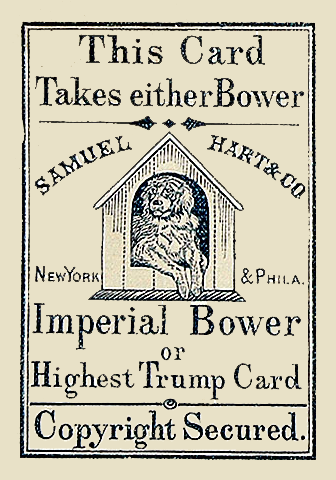
An early Joker by Samuel Hart, c. 1863

The United States introduced the joker into the deck. It was devised for the game of euchre, which spread from Europe to America beginning shortly after the American Revolutionary War. In euchre, the highest trump card is the Jack of the trump suit, called the right bower (from the German Bauer); the second-highest trump, the left bower, is the jack of the suit of the same color as trumps. The joker was invented c. 1860 as a third trump, the imperial or best bower, which ranked higher than the other two bowers. The name of the card is believed to derive from juker, a variant name for euchre. The earliest reference to a joker functioning as a wild card dates to 1875 with a variation of poker.

Playing cards were also some of the earliest products to be sold in packaging. Early card packs were sold in paper sleeves held closed with a string. The 19th century saw the apparition of progressively more complex cardboard packaging, with tuck-flap boxes becoming common by the end of the century. Cellophane wrappers were common by 1937.

=== Modern-era manufacturers and artists ===
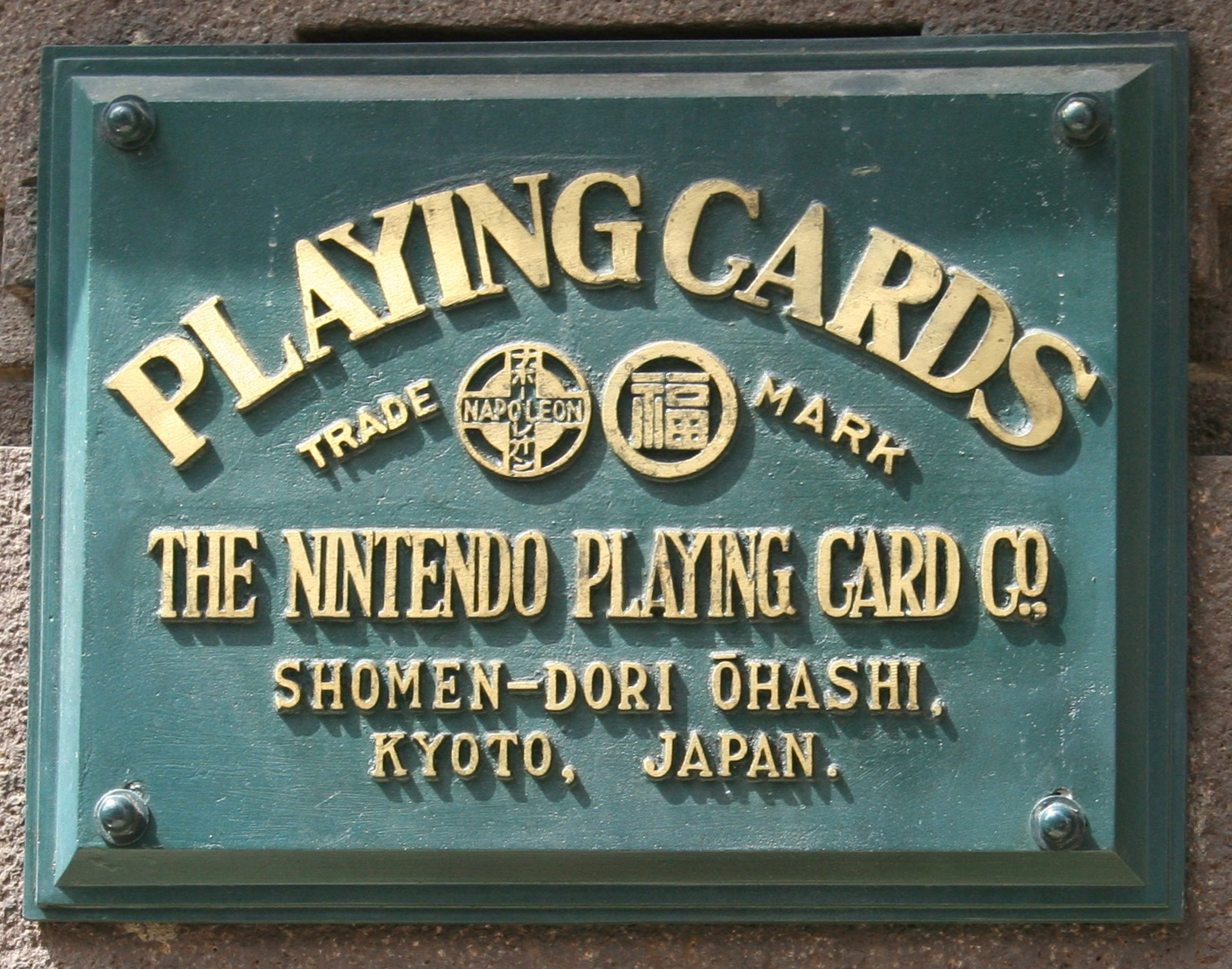
Company name plate at the original headquarters of Nintendo

The Japanese video game company Nintendo was founded in 1889 to produce and distribute karuta (かるた; from Portuguese carta, 'card'), most notably hanafuda (花札, 'flower cards'). Hanafuda cards had become popular after Japan banned most forms of gambling in 1882 but largely left hanafuda untouched. Sales of hanafuda cards were popular with the yakuza-run gaming parlors in Kyoto. Other card manufacturers had opted to leave the market not wanting to be associated with criminal ties, but Nintendo founder Fusajiro Yamauchi continued, becoming the largest producer of hanafuda within a few years. With the increase of the cards' popularity, Yamauchi hired assistants to mass-produce to satisfy the demand. Even with a favorable start, the business faced financial struggle due to operating in a niche market, the slow and expensive manufacturing process, high product price, alongside long durability of the cards, which impacted sales due to the low replacement rate. As a solution, Nintendo produced a cheaper and lower-quality line of playing cards, Tengu, while also conducting product offerings in other cities such as Osaka, where card game profits were high. In addition, local merchants were interested in the prospect of a continuous renewal of decks, thus avoiding the suspicions that reusing cards would generate.

== Research ==
Columbia University's Rare Book and Manuscript Library holds the Albert Field Collection of Playing Cards, an archive of over 6,000 individual decks from over 50 countries and dating back to the 1550s. In 2018 the university digitized over 100 of its decks.

Since 2017, Vanderbilt University has been home to the 1,000-volume George Clulow and United States Playing Card Co. Gaming Collection, which has been called one of the "most complete and scholarly collections [of books on cards and gaming] that has ever been gathered together".

=== Journals ===
Journals and magazines dedicated to the subject of playing cards include:

- Das Blatt – German publication primarily on playing card designs and history
- The Playing-Card – international publication incorporating research articles on playing cards and card games
- Clear the Decks – American publication of 52 Plus Joker

== Modern formats ==
International playing card suits
Italian	Cups	Coins	Clubs	Swords	
Spanish	Cups	Coins	Clubs	Swords	
Portuguese	Cups	Coins	Clubs	Swords	
Unsun Karuta	Cups	Coins	Clubs	Swords	Guru
French	Hearts	Diamonds	Clubs	Spades	
German	Hearts	Bells	Acorns	Leaves	
Polish	Hearts	Bells	Acorns	Leaves	
Swiss	Roses	Bells	Acorns	Shields	

Contemporary playing cards are grouped into three broad categories based on the suits they use: French, Latin, and Germanic. Latin suits are used in the closely related Spanish and Italian formats. The Swiss-German suits are distinct enough to merit their subcategory. Excluding jokers and tarot trumps, the French 52-card deck preserves the number of cards in the original Mamluk deck, while Latin and Germanic decks average fewer. Latin decks usually drop the higher-valued pip cards, while Germanic decks drop the lower-valued ones.

Within suits, there are regional or national variations called "standard patterns." Pattern differences are most easily found in the face cards but the number of cards per deck, the use of numeric indices, or even minor shape and arrangement differences of the pips can be used to distinguish them. Some patterns have been around for hundreds of years. Jokers are not part of any pattern as they are a relatively recent invention and lack any standardized appearance so each publisher usually puts its own trademarked illustration into their decks. The wide variation of jokers has turned them into collectible items. Any card that bore the stamp duty like the ace of spades in England, the ace of clubs in France or the ace of coins in Italy are also collectible as that is where the manufacturer's logo is usually placed.

Typically, playing cards have indices printed in the upper-left and lower-right corners. While this design does not restrict which hand players hold their cards, some left-handed players may prefer to fan their cards in the opposite direction. Some designs exist with indices in all four corners.

=== French-suited decks ===
52 French-suited playing cards with jokers, with honors marked in English

French decks come in a variety of patterns and deck sizes. The 52-card deck is the most popular deck and includes 13 ranks of each suit with reversible "court" or face cards. Each suit includes an ace, depicting a single symbol of its suit, a king, queen, and jack, each depicted with a symbol of their suit; and ranks two through ten, with each card depicting that number of pips of its suit. As well as these 52 cards, commercial packs often include between one and six jokers, most often two.

Decks with fewer than 52 cards are known as stripped decks. The piquet pack has all values from 2 through 6 in each suit removed for a total of 32 cards. It is popular in France, the Low Countries, Central Europe and is used to play piquet, belote, bezique and skat. Values in Russian 36-card stripped deck (used to play durak and many other traditional games) range from 6 to 10. It is also used in the Sri Lankan, whist-based game known as omi. Forty-card French suited packs are common in northwest Italy; these remove the 8s through 10s like Latin-suited decks. 24-card decks, removing 2s through 8s are also sold in Austria and Bavaria to play Schnapsen.

A pinochle deck consists of two copies of a 24-card schnapsen deck, thus 48 cards.

The 78-card Tarot Nouveau adds the knight card between queens and jacks along with 21 numbered trumps and the unnumbered Fool.

== Manufacturing ==
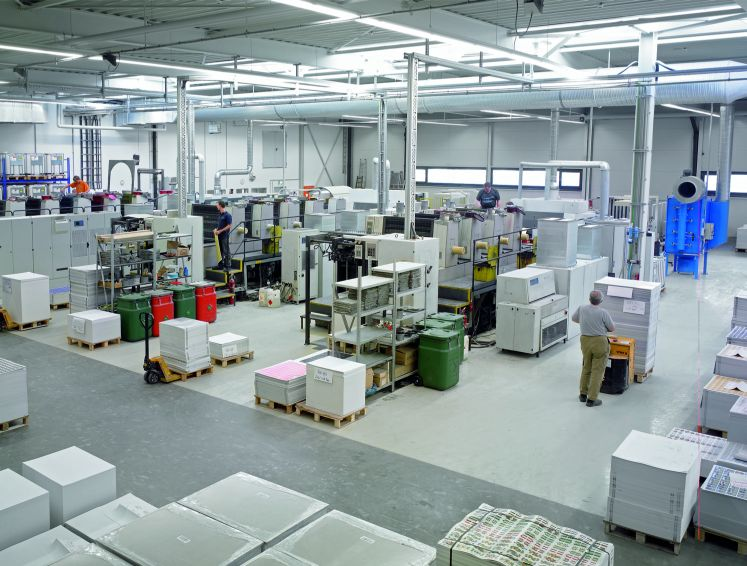
The Spielkartenfabrik Altenburg playing card factory in Altenburg, Germany

Comparison of dimensions of common playing card sizes

Today the process of making playing cards is highly automated. Large sheets of paper are glued together to create a sheet of pasteboard; the glue may be black or dyed another dark color to increase the card stock's opacity. In the industry, this black compound is sometimes known as "gick". Some card manufacturers may purchase pasteboard from various suppliers; large companies such as USPCC create their own proprietary pasteboard. After the desired imagery is etched into printing plates, the art is printed onto each side of the pasteboard sheet, which is coated with a textured or smooth finish, sometimes called a varnish or paint coating. These coatings can be water- or solvent-based, and different textures and visual effects can be achieved by adding certain dyes or foils, or using multiple varnish processes.

The pasteboard is then split into individual uncut sheets, which are cut into single cards and sorted into decks. The corners are then rounded, after which the decks are packaged, commonly in tuck boxes wrapped in cellophane. The tuck box may have a seal applied.

Card manufacturers must pay special attention to the registration of the cards, as non-symmetrical cards can be used to cheat.

== Non-standard design and use ==
=== Airlines ===
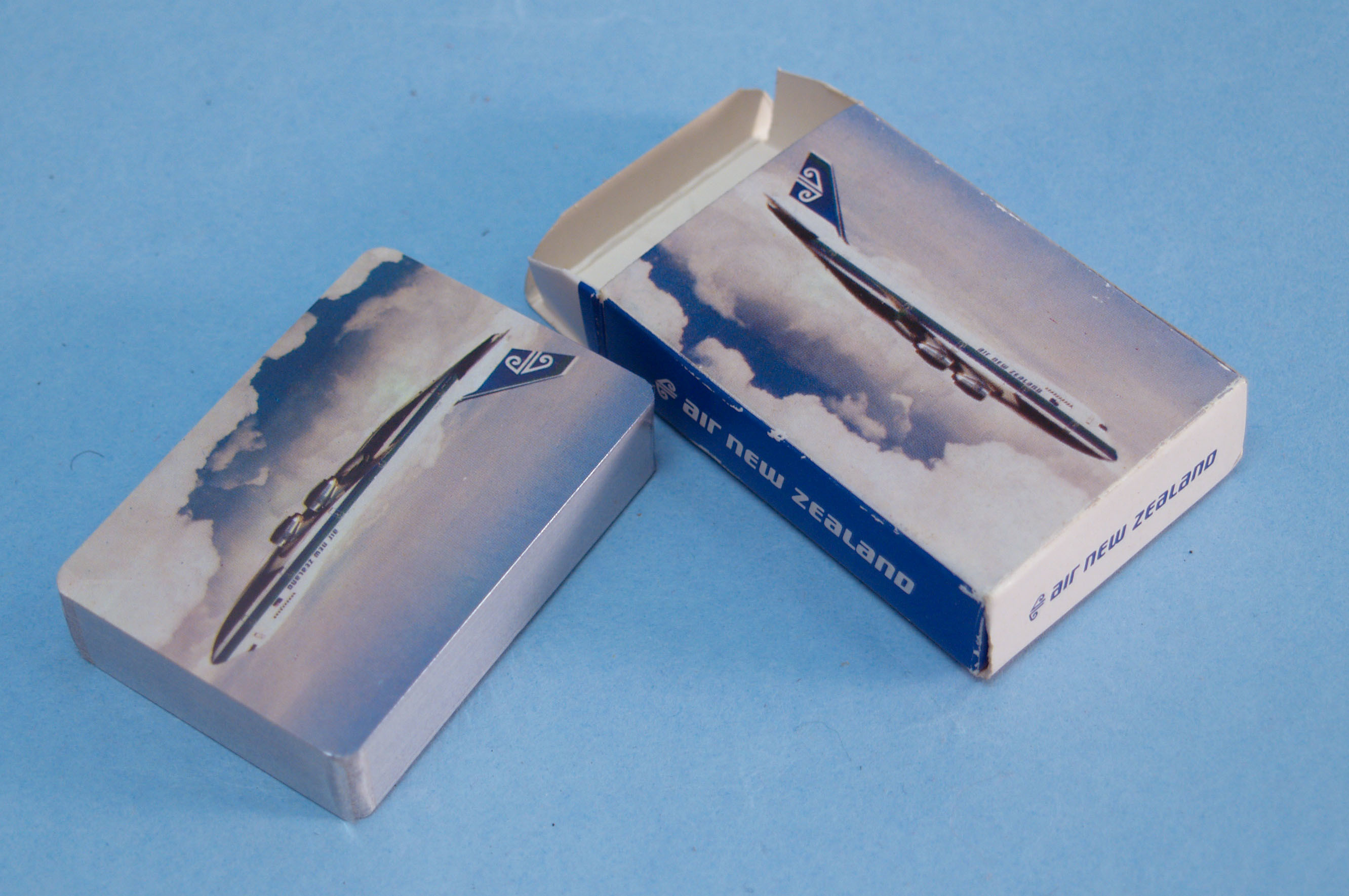
Playing cards produced by Air New Zealand

Airlines have produced playing cards to give to passengers since the 1920s, with the practice reaching a zenith in the 1960s and 1970s. However, the practice has become less common in recent decades.

Delta Air Lines has created several series of decks, with several featuring art by Daniel C. Sweeney, John Hardy, and Jack Laycox.

=== Casinos ===
Gambling corporations commonly have playing cards made specifically for their casinos. As casinos consume many decks daily, they sometimes resell used cards that were "on the [casino] floor". The cards sold to the public are altered, either by cutting the deck's corners or by punching a hole in the deck, to prevent them from being used for cheating in the casino.

Casinos may also sell decks separately as a souvenir item — one notable example is Jerry's Nugget playing cards, released in 1970.

=== Cold case cards ===
Police departments, local governments, state prison systems, and even private organizations across the United States and other countries have created decks of cards that feature photos, names, and details of cold case victims or missing persons on each card. These decks are sold in prison commissaries, or even to the public, in the hopes that an inmate (or anyone else) might provide a new lead. Cold case card programs have been introduced in over a dozen states, including by Oklahoma's State Bureau of Investigation, Connecticut's Division of Criminal Justice (five editions), the Minnesota Bureau of Criminal Apprehension (in 2008), Delaware's Department of Correction, the Florida Department of Law Enforcement, and Rhode Island's Department of Corrections, among others. The Indiana Department of Correction sells cold case cards in prisons, and in 2024, Mississippi Coast Crime Stoppers created cold case playing cards, distributing 2,500 decks.

Among inmates, they may be called "snitch cards". Prisoners with information may be motivated to come forward in order to receive a lightened sentence.

=== Collecting ===
Because of the long history and wide variety in designs, playing cards are also collector's items. In 1911, the New York Times described May King Van Rensselaer's playing card collection of over 900 decks as the largest in the world. According to Guinness World Records, the largest playing card collection comprises 11,087 decks and is owned by Liu Fuchang of China. Individual playing cards are also collected, such as the world record collection of 8,520 different jokers belonging to Tony de Santis of Italy.

=== Custom designs and artwork ===
Custom decks may be produced for myriad purposes. Across the world, both individuals and large companies such as United States Playing Card Company (USPCC) design and release many different styles of decks, including commemorative decks, cards created for fundraising, and souvenir decks. Bold and colorful designs tend to be used for cardistry decks, while more generally, playing cards (as well as tarot cards) may focus on artistic value. Custom deck production is commonly funded on platforms such as Kickstarter, with companies offering card printing services to the public. Decks may be produced in a variety of editions.

In 1976, the JPL Gallery in London commissioned a card deck from a variety of contemporary British artists including Maggie Hambling, Patrick Heron, David Hockney, Howard Hodgkin, John Hoyland, and Allen Jones called "The Deck of Cards". Forty years later in 2016, the British Council commissioned a similar deck called "Taash ke Patte" featuring Indian artists such as Bhuri Bai, Shilpa Gupta, Krishen Khanna, Ram Rahman, Gulam Mohammed Sheikh, Arpita Singh, and Thukral & Tagra. American artist Tom Sachs has printed several custom decks featuring photos of his artwork.

Playing cards themselves may also be used to make art, such as being used as a canvas for an artist trading card.

=== Military identification ===
Playing cards are a useful tool to pass information to troops during downtime. In World War II, the United States Playing Card Company produced a deck of cards featuring silhouettes of American, British, German, Italian, and Japanese aircraft. The Allies also produced maps concealed in playing cards. During the 2003 invasion of Iraq, the US military produced Most-wanted Iraqi playing cards to help soldiers identify enemy leaders. According to a Defense Intelligence Agency spokesperson, the practice actually dates back to the American Civil War. A design depicting Igor Girkin and presumably other Russian leaders appeared during the 2022 Russian invasion of Ukraine, and a similar deck of cards depicting Hamas was produced after the October 7, 2023 Hamas attacks on Israel.

Card decks have also been used as an educational tool to help military personnel and civilians identify unexploded ordnance.

== Opposition to the use of playing cards ==
Playing cards have developed an association with gambling or idle frivolity. The early Methodists did not participate in, and condemned, "worldly habits" including "playing cards, racing horses, gambling, attending the theater, dancing (both in frolics and balls), and cockfighting." The mother of Methodism Barbara Heck observed fellow Irish immigrants playing cards and then took them and "swept the cards into the fire". Methodist minister Harlie W. Smith described that following his experience of being born again, "three decks of cards and my dice went into the furnace." To the present-day, a number of Methodist denominations aligned with the holiness movement, such as the Allegheny Wesleyan Methodist Connection and Christ's Sanctified Holy Church, oppose the use of playing cards.

A number of former Methodists contributed to the formation of Holiness Pentecostalism and thus, the opposition of playing cards became part of the holiness standards upheld by Holiness Pentecostal denominations, such as the Apostolic Faith Church.

== Symbols in Unicode ==
♠ ♣ ♥ ♦ ♤ ♧ ♡ ♢o

Suit symbols
- In Unicode: U+2660 ♠ BLACK SPADE SUIT U+2665 ♥ BLACK HEART SUIT; U+2663 ♣ BLACK CLUB SUIT; U+2666 ♦ BLACK DIAMOND SUIT; U+2664 ♤ WHITE SPADE SUIT; U+2661 ♡ WHITE HEART SUIT; U+2667 ♧ WHITE CLUB SUIT U+2662 ♢ WHITE DIAMOND SUIT

The Unicode standard for character encoding defines 8 characters (symbols) for card suits in the Miscellaneous Symbols block, at U+2660–2667. The Unicode names for each group of four glyphs are 'black' and 'white' but might have been more accurately described as 'solid' and 'outline' since the colour actually used at display or printing time is an application choice.

Later, Unicode 7.0 added the 52 cards of the modern French pack, plus 4 knights, and a character for "Playing Card Back" and black, red and white jokers, in the Playing Cards block (U+1F0A0–1F0FF).

== See also ==
Types of decks
Standard 52-card deck
Stripped deck
Tarot
Transformation playing card
Trick deck

Uses
Card game
Cartomancy
Card manipulation
Card money
Card throwing
House of cards
Sleight of hand

Geographic origin
Chinese playing cards
French playing cards
Ganjifa
German playing cards
Hanafuda
Italian playing cards
Karuta
Spanish playing cards
Swiss playing cards
Tujeon

Terminology
Glossary of card game terms
List of playing card nicknames

Specific decks
Archaeology awareness playing cards
Most-wanted Iraqi playing cards
Politicards
Trading card
Zener cards (parapsychology)

Sources for further information
Cary Collection of Playing Cards
International Playing-Card Society
Musée Français de la Carte à Jouer
Museum of Fournier de Naipes
Playing card manufacturers
Playing card organisations
