= War (card game) =

Simple card game

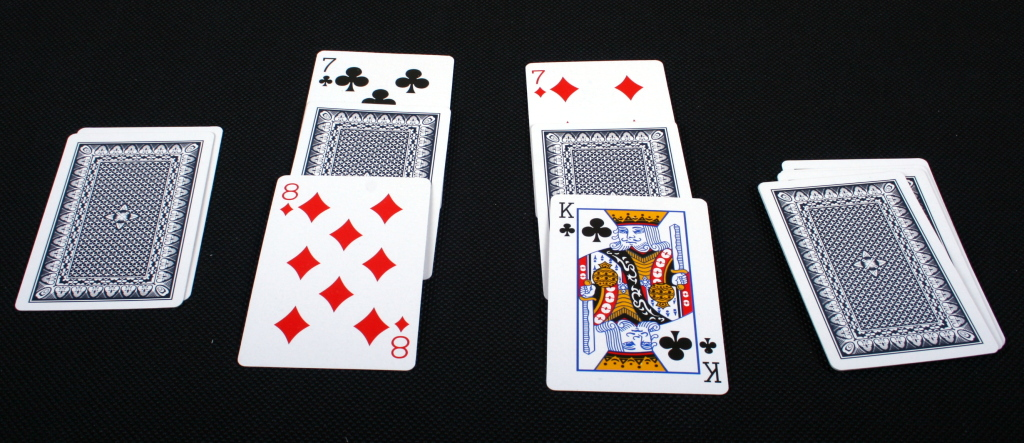
- A "war" in the game of War: having dealt matching 7s, both players play a stack of three face-down cards on top of their card, followed by a face-up card. In this case, the king wins.
- Alternative names: Battle
- Type: Catching type
- Players: 2
- Skills: Counting and card values
- Age range: any
- Cards: 52 (54 or 55 with optional jokers)
- Deck: French
- Rank (high→low): Joker (optional) A K Q J 10 9 8 7 6 5 4 3 2
- Play: Simultaneous
- Playing time: 10–40 min. (theoretically might be infinite)
- Chance: High

Related games
- Beggar-My-Neighbour

War (also known as Battle in the United Kingdom) is a simple card game, typically played by two players using a standard playing card deck—and often played by children. There are many variations, as well as related games such as the German 32-card Tod und Leben ("Death and Life").

== Rules ==
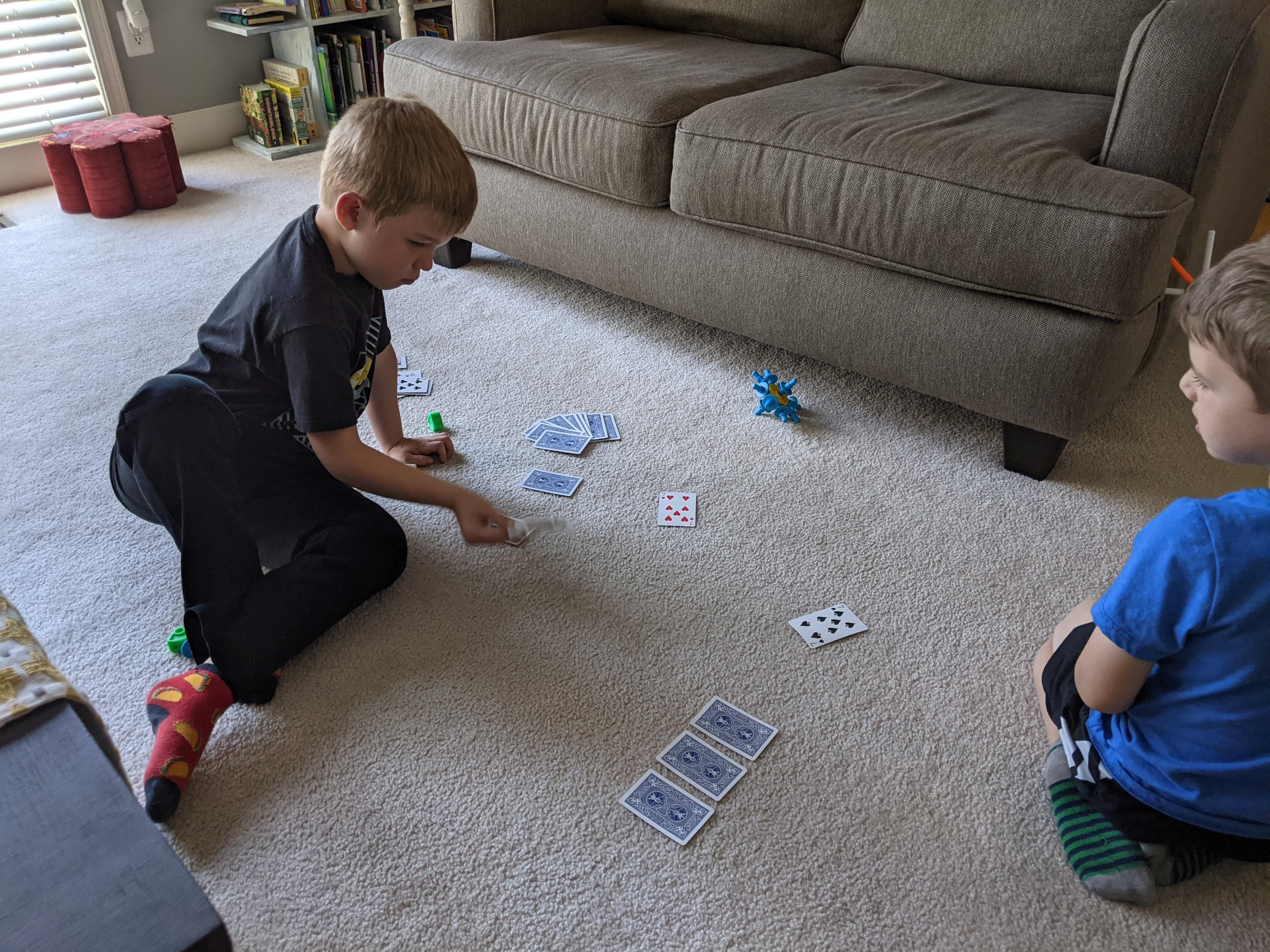
Children playing War

The objective of the game is to win all of the cards.

The deck is divided evenly among the players, giving each a down stack. In unison, each player reveals the top card of their deck—this is a "battle"—and the player with the higher card takes both of the cards played and moves them to their stack. Aces are high, and suits are ignored.

If the two cards played are of equal value, then there is a "war". Both players place the next card from their pile face down and then another card face-up. The owner of the higher face-up card wins the war and adds all the cards on the table to the bottom of their deck. If the face-up cards are again equal then the battle repeats with another set of face-down/up cards. This repeats until one player's face-up card is higher than their opponent's.

Most descriptions of War are unclear about what happens if a player runs out of cards during a war. In some variants, that player immediately loses. In others, the player may play the last card in their deck as their face-up card for the remainder of the war or replay the game from the beginning. There also exists a variant where the player that possesses a larger amount of cards must provide the cards to fight the war.

War can also be played by multiple people. Each player in a three-player game receives 17 cards, while each person in a four-player game receives 13. Each player must simultaneously reveal their card, just like in the two-player version. If the highest cards played are tied, they will go to war. All players, including those who are not tied, will play one face-down card and the following face-up card. The person who has the highest card at the end of the war obtains all of the cards that have been played. When a player runs out of cards, they are eliminated and are no longer in the game. The game will continue until one player has collected all of the cards.

Game designer Greg Costikyan has observed that since there are no choices in the game, and all outcomes are random, it cannot be considered a game by some definitions. However, the rules often do not specify in which order the cards should be returned to the deck. If they are returned in a non-random order, the decision of putting one card before another after a victory can change the overall outcome of the game. The effects of such decisions are more visible with smaller size decks as it is easier for a player to card count; however, the decisions can still affect gameplay if taken in standard decks.

== Variations ==
Being a widely known game, War has many variations. Recorded variants include:

Casino War
A simple variation played for money in casinos.
Three cards
Many play with three cards being played face-down during a war.
Prisoners of War
Usually played with more than 2 players. When a player wins a battle, they can choose to take one of the cards as "prisoner"; this must not be one of their own cards. If they do, they put the card face up in front of them, away from the discard pile and the deck. When another battle is started, a player may choose to not play a card from their deck, and instead of the "prisoner" card. (They cannot look at the card they would have drawn and then choose to play the prisoner.) If a player wins the battle, it works like a regular one. If they lose, however, they give the winner the card they played as well as the card they would have drawn if they chose not to play the "prisoner" card. If a war is initiated, it works the same way. If a player wins a war, they can also choose to "capture" one of the face-down cards.
Bettelmann ("Beggar Man") and Tod und Leben ("Life and Death")
German variants mentioned as early as 1833. Uses a 32-card Skat pack for 2 players with cards ranking in the natural order and suits being irrelevant, except that in Tod und Leben, one player plays with the red suits and the other with the black suits. Players get 16 cards each face down. They turn over their top cards at the same time and the higher card wins. If the cards are equal, players turn the next card and the winner takes all four cards. The player with the most cards at the end wins.
Automatic War
Laying down a two of any suit causes a War to be declared.
Peace
The opposite of War, in that the lowest card always wins.
Underdog
The losing player of a War steals the victory if one of their three discard cards is a Jack.

== See also ==
- Beggar-your-neighbor
- Egyptian Ratscrew
- Slapjack
- Snip Snap Snorem

== Literature ==
- Gööck, Roland (1967). Freude am Kartenspiel, Bertelsmann, Gütersloh.
