= Banka bäver =

Swedish card game

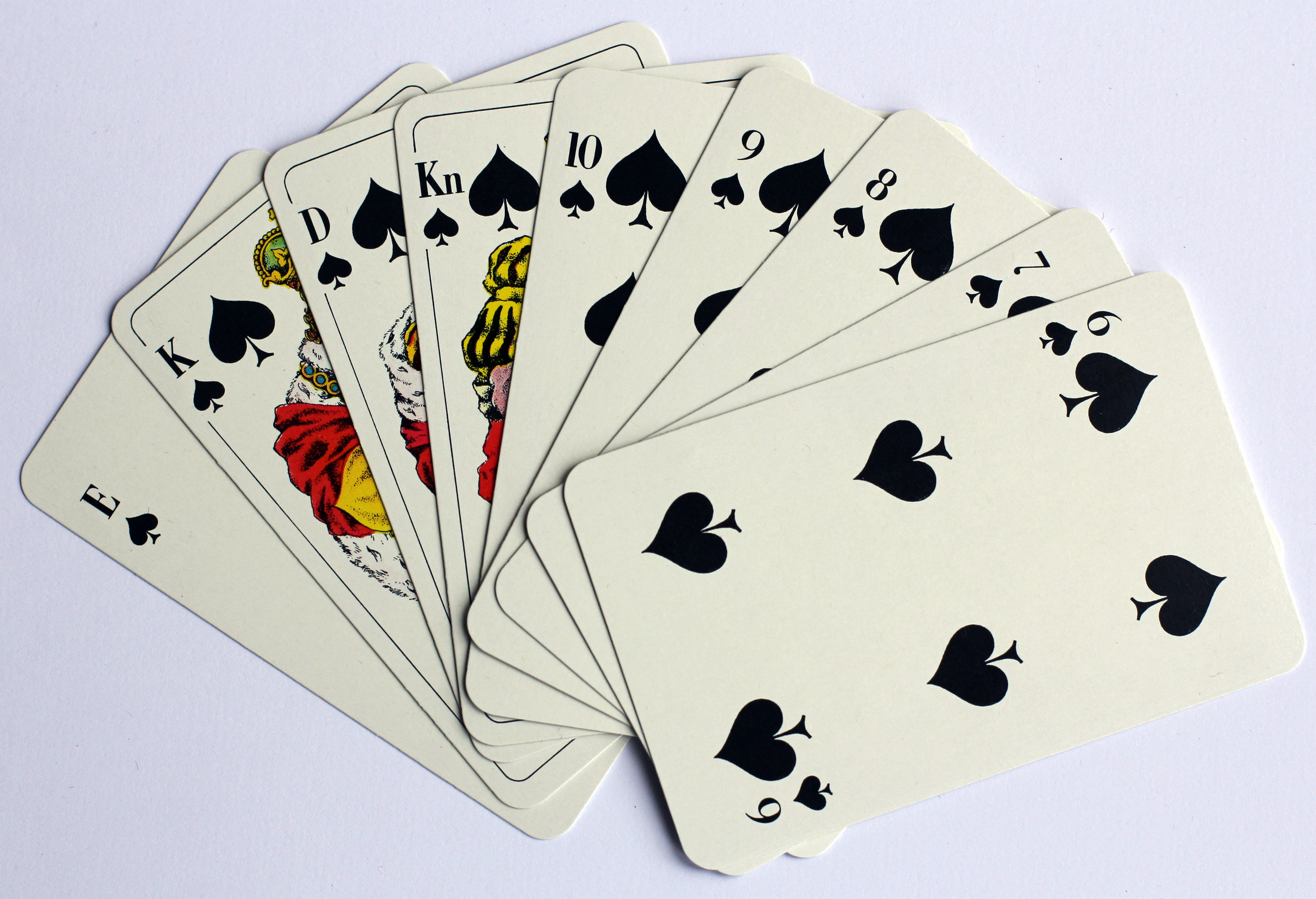
- The spades in a modern Swedish pattern pack
- Origin: Sweden
- Players: 2 or more
- Skills: Speed
- Cards: 52
- Deck: Modern Swedish pattern, French-suited pack
- Play: Clockwise

Banka bäver ("thumping beaver") is a Swedish round game, which may be considered a development of the children's card game beggar my neighbour, with elements from two other English card games for children: Slapjack and Snap.

== Rules ==
The following description is based on Clarke (2016) and Nyberg (2023).

=== Deal ===
The pack is dealt such that each player receives the same number of cards. Excess cards are placed in a pile in the middle, and the dealer shows the bottom card to everyone (this is important later). The players' cards are stacked face down.

=== Play ===
The players take turns turning over the top card of their piles and placing it on the centre pile. As soon as the face-up card is a court card or ace, the next player in turn must lay down 1 card for a jack, 2 cards for a queen, 3 cards for a king) or 4 cards for an ace. If all the cards laid out in this way are pip cards, all the cards in the centre pile go to the player who laid out the ace or court card. Should an ace or court card be laid out, the turn passes to the next player, who becomes the one to continue laying cards.

=== Slapping ===
A player can also win the cards in the centre pile by being the first to slap the pile with a hand in two specific situations:

1. When two cards of the same value are placed one after the other, or ...
2. When the last card dealt has the same value as the bottom card in the pile.

=== Winning ===
The winner is the player who ends up with all the cards.

== In culture ==
When Swedish skier Stina Nilsson had broken the 100 m world record three times in the same event in 2012, she revealed that she trained for speed by playing banka bäver.

== Bibliography ==
- Nyberg, Andreas (2023). Roliga kortspel och tärningsspel för hela familjen. Sundbyberg: Semic. p. 12. ISBN 978-91-552-7212-8.
- Clarke, Phil (2016). Roliga kortspel för hela familjen. Stockholm: Känguru. pp. 58–59. ISBN 978-91-7663-120-1.
