= Snapp =

Village in Sweden

Coordinates: 65°13′33″N 20°15′48″E

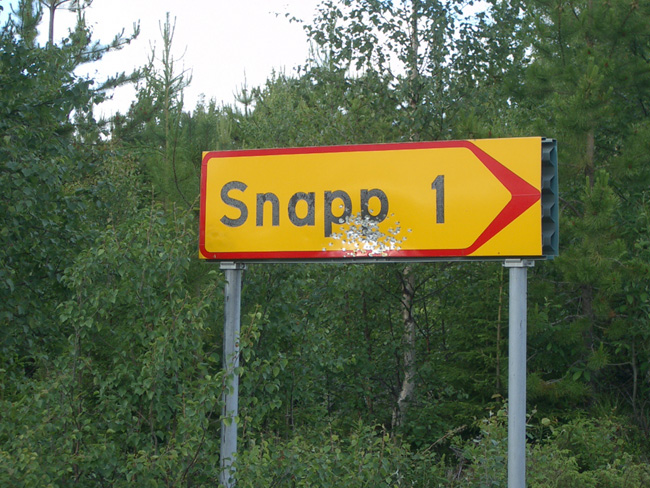
A road sign on the road between Myrheden and Jörn.

Snapp is a village, now mostly used as a farm in Jörns socken, Skellefteå Municipality, Västerbotten County, Sweden.

The village got its name in the 19th century when a geographical surveyor played with the childish rhyme Snipp, snapp, snorum, hej basalorum and named five new populated places in the Jörn Parish each after a word in the rhyme. The buildings' designations in the village still bear the name Snapp (Snapp 1:3 and Snapp 1:4). Snipp, Snorum, Hej and Basalorum are four other villages in the vicinity.
