= Woodland Snap =

Children's card game

Woodland Snap is a version of the classic children's game Snap, with woodland animals as the characters. It uses a proprietary pack with 11 animal characters and 4 of each card. The game was first published in 1960 by Pepys Games and the illustrations were drawn by children's author and artist Racey Helps (1913-70). The cards started off as basic black and white drawings, but over fifty years they have developed into colour.

== Playing ==
The game follows the normal rules of Snap, but in addition the pack contains guidance on etiquette and rules for more advanced games.

== Characters ==
There are eleven characters in the game:

- Humphry Goggle - the male toad
- Mrs. Croak - the female toad
- Barnaby Littlemouse - the male mouse
- Millicent Littlemouse - the female mouse
- Widow Pintips - the old hedgehog
- Prettywigs Pattikin - the female squirrel
- Tippetty Nippet - the young squirrel
- Hoppy Spadge - the sparrow
- Nubby Tope - the mole
- Dr. Bunfuz - the rabbit
- Mr. Cunningleigh-Sligh - the fox
