= Domino (card game) =

Card game

- Card Dominoes, Sevens, Spoof, Fan Tan, Parliament
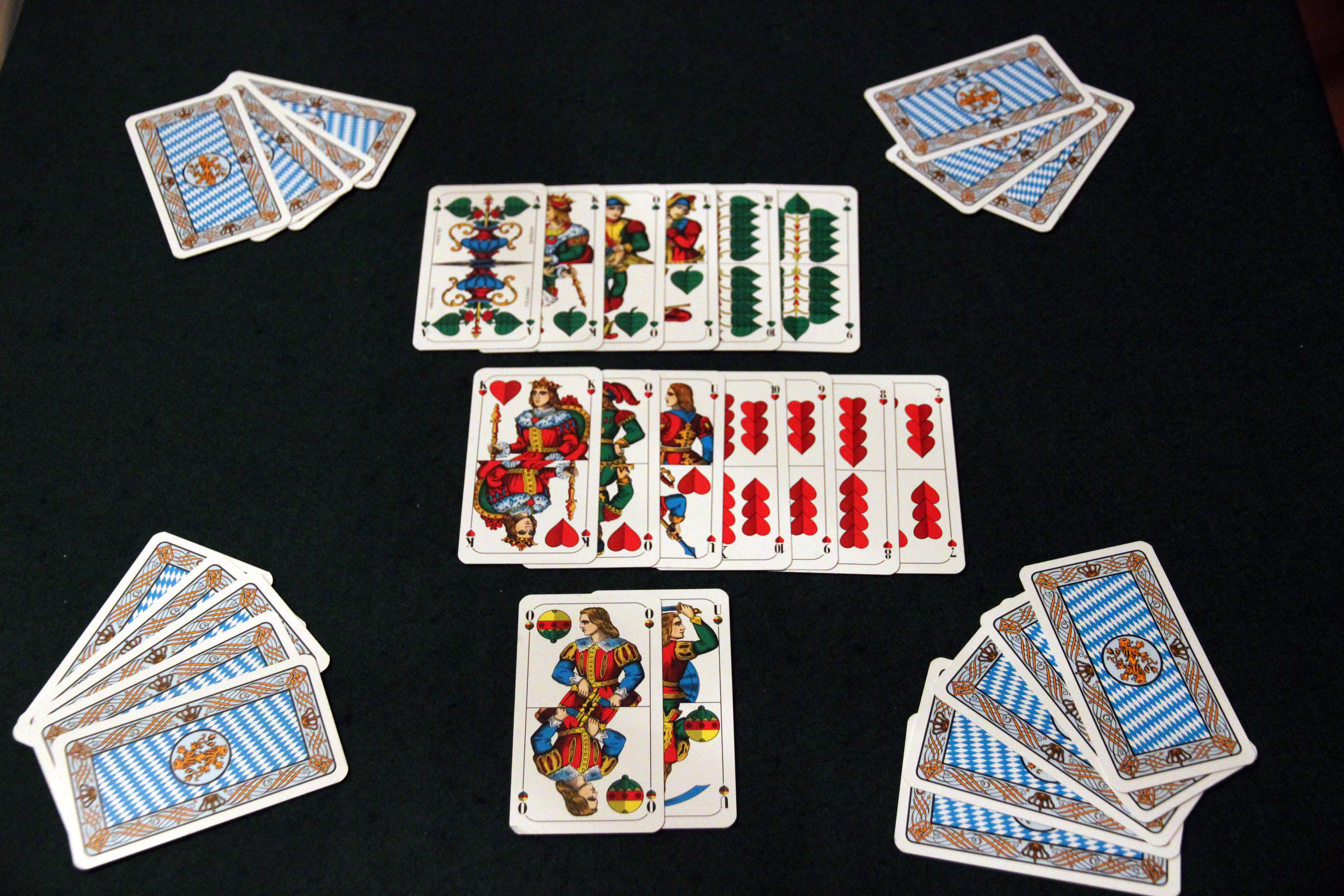
- A typical Domino-type game (Unteransetzen) under way
- Type: Shedding game
- Players: 3–8
- Age range: 6+
- Cards: 32 or 52
- Deck: French or German
- Rank (high→low): Natural
- Play: Clockwise
- Chance: Low

Domino, also known as Card Dominoes, Spoof, Sevens, Fan Tan (US) or Parliament (UK), is a card game of the Layout Group of matching card games for 3–8 players in which players aim to shed cards by matching the preceding ones or, if unable, must draw from the stock. Cards are played out to form a layout of sequences going up and down in suit from the agreed starting card (e.g. a Seven or an Unter). The game is won by the player who is first to empty their hand. The game is a cross between dominoes and patience and is suitable for children who have learnt the various card values.

== Cards ==
Domino variants are played with 32- or 52-card packs and French- or German-suited cards.

== Rules ==
All cards are dealt to the players, even if as a result some players have one card more than others. The first player begins by leading a card of the agreed rank, say, a Jack or Unter to the table. The next player must then play a Ten or a Queen/Ober of the same suit. Subsequently, players must either add a card of the same suit and one higher or one lower than the sequence of cards on the table. Players may also play another Jack or Unter to start a new suit sequence. A player who cannot place a card passes.

The player who is first to shed their cards wins; play usually continues to determine who is second, third, etc.

Scoring, if desired, can be done by simply counting the remaining cards in players' hands. Other methods of scoring such as counting the remaining pips (Jacks, Queens and Kings each contributing 10, Aces contributing 15) may lead to greater attention to high-scoring cards. Alternatively points may be awarded or deducted depending on the order in which players 'go out'.

The game is well suited for parties of mixed ages; with small children it can be played until all players have finished.

== Variations ==
=== Sevens ===
In Sevens, the player with the Seven of Hearts leads off. Play continues as above except that new sequences are started with the remaining three Sevens. It often makes sense for players to avoid playing cards close to Seven in order to force others to play cards in other suits in which the blocking player may hold high or low cards. In some variants of the game all players receive the same number of cards and the remainder (if any) is turned face up and can be played by anyone as needed. In some variants, after a seven has been played other cards of the same suit may not be added before the eight is also played. In some variants players are allowed to pass even when they are able to play a card.

=== Fan Tan ===
In some editions of Hoyle, the game is called by its common American name, Fan Tan, or Play or Pay. It differs from the Sevens rules given above as follows: the player left of the dealer begins by playing any seven or passing. The game is played with a pool, and penalties are paid for passing, for passing when able to play, and for passing when holding a seven.

The same name is used for the following variant that starts with the aces. When the deal has been decided, the cards are dealt singly, and any that are left over form a stock, which is placed face downwards on the table. Each player contributes a fixed stake or ante. The first player can enter if they have an ace; if they have not, they pay an ante and take a card from the stock; the second player is then called upon and acts similarly until an ace is played. This (and the other aces when played) is put face upwards on the table, and the piles are built up from the ace to the king. The pool goes to the first player to empty their hand. If a player fails to play, having a playable card, they are fined the amount of the ante for every card in the other players' hands.

=== Showdown ===
In the variation known as Eights, the Eight of a suit must be played first, followed by the 9 and the 7. Only then can the remainder of the cards be played, increasing from the 9 and decreasing from the 7. In addition, when a player is unable to play, they must take a chip or marker indicating that they were the last player unable to play. Scoring is based on the cards remaining in each player's hands when the first player has played out: face value for numbered cards, 10 for face cards, 15 for aces (which are low), and 25 points to the player holding the marker. If two or more players have the same number of points that round then they "showdown". Those players will receive a zero for that round and all other players will receive points as normal.

== National or regional variants ==
=== Argentina ===
In Argentina, the game is called Yuto.

=== Austria ===
In Austria, a similar game known as Unteransetzen is played using a pack of 32 German-suited cards in which an Unter, usually the Unter of Hearts, is led to the table. Players build on the first Unter, play another or pass. In another variant, Zehnerlegen, the Tens take the place of Unters. The game has numerous other local names.

=== Finland ===
In the Finnish variant known as Ristiseiska ("the seven of clubs"), the first card to be played must be the seven of clubs. If a player is unable to play a card, the previous player must choose and hand them a card (usually a worthless or low value card). Both the eight and six of each respective suit must be played before any other cards may be played further on that suit. The game is over when someone runs out of cards.

=== France ===
The French also play a card game called Domino, which is essentially the same as Sevens except that the player to the dealer's left leads, and may lead a card of any rank. Subsequent players may then build on that suit or start a new suit with a card of the same rank as that originally led.

=== Germany ===
==== Karten-Domino ====
The equivalent of Sevens is usually known as Karten-Domino ("Card Domino"), may be played with a 32- or 52-card pack and any Eight or Jack (Unters) may be used to start off. A variant called Zehnerlegen, in which the Tens are used as start cards, is played in Bavaria using a Bavarian pattern pack.

==== Bubenlegen or Buurn-leggen ====
A simple domino game known as Buurn-leggen (= Bubenlegen or "Jack Laying") involves playing a Jack on the table, behind and in front of which the suit sequence is built. If a player has no card with which to build, but has another Jack, may start a new sequence. The first player to shed all their cards is the winner.

==== Elfer Raus! ====
Another similar game called Elfer Raus! ("elevens out!") is played with custom cards depicting the numbers from 1 to 20 in four (in some editions three) colours. It is marketed in Germany by Ravensburger. In this game three fourths of the cards remain in the stock, players can play as many cards as they want in one move, and players who cannot play at least one card must draw up to three cards. The score of a card is its face value. The rulebook distributed with the game describes two variants (one permitting each colour to be started with 10 or 12 instead of 11, and one that is similar to the French card game Domino) as well as how to play various children's games with the set.

==== Siebener raus ====
The following variant is described under the name Siebener raus ("sevens out") in a German book. The game starts with the seven of clubs. For any seven that has been played, no other cards of that suit may be played before the six and then the eight. When the six, seven and eight of a suit have been played other cards of the same suit may be played at any time to form stacks on the six (descending to the ace) and eight (ascending to the king). At the end of the game, each player pays the total value of their remaining cards, and the last player who had to pass pays an additional penalty.

=== India ===
In India, the game is called Satti Centre (Hindi for "seven as centre") or Badaam Saat ("seven of hearts"). It starts with the seven of hearts and the subsequent players may use an adjacent card, a seven of any suit, or pass. A player can pass only if no playable card is available, else a penalty is dealt (if discovered).

More than one deck of cards can be used. The first card must always be the seven of hearts, but the first move in such cases is decided by the dealer's position (eg. the closest in the direction of dealing), particular deck (if designs are distinguishable) or simply by calling it first.

The game ends when a player has no cards left. Points, are scored by adding the value of the cards left in hands of the remaining players for a number of games. (1 point for an ace, 2 for a two, 11 for a jack, 13 for a king and so on. In some variations, the ace and/or the face cards are worth 10 points.) The player(s) with the most points at the end of the set loses. In a variation, the winner gets the sum of all the values of cards left in hands of the remaining players, and the player with the most points wins at the end of a set.

=== Japan ===
In the variation known as Shichi Narabe (in Japanese: 七並べ), the players remove all sevens from their hands to start the layout before the first card is played. Up to three times per game a player may choose to pass.

In some variations, when a player has run out of passes (at their fourth pass), they place all their remaining cards in their places on the playing space and become a Yūrei (ghost). Players who have become Yūrei are effectively out and no longer active in the game, but if they can trick a player still in the game to speak to them or respond to something they say, the Yūrei switches places with that player, taking their hand of cards and becoming "back in" the game while the other player becomes the new Yūrei. The goal of the "alive" players is to ignore the Yūrei and pretend they cannot see or hear them at all costs, hence why they are called "ghosts".

=== Russia ===
The variant played in Russia is called Deviatka (Russian for nine). The game is played with either 52 or 36 (aces to sixes in each suit) cards, it always starts with the nine of diamonds.

=== Spain ===
The Spanish variant known as Cinquillo is played with the Spanish deck of 40 cards. In this game the sequences start with the four fives, and the five of oros must be played first.

=== Sweden ===
In the Swedish variant known as Sjuan ("Seven"), the first card to be played must be the seven of hearts. If a player is unable to play a card, the previous player hands them a card, usually the most useless card they have, and the turn passes on to the next player. The highest card in sjuan is King while the lowest is Ace. If someone can play out all their cards, they may do so.

== Literature ==
- Gööck, Roland (1967). Freude am Kartenspiel. Gütersloh Bertelsmann.
