= Egyptian War =

Egyptian War may refer to:

- First Anglo-Egyptian war (1807)
- Egyptian–Ottoman War (1831–33)
- Egyptian–Ottoman War (1839–41)
- Ethiopian–Egyptian War (1874–1876)
- Anglo-Egyptian War (1882)
- Libyan–Egyptian War (1977)
- Israeli-Egyptian War

== Games ==
- Egyptian Ratscrew, card game
