= Bettelmann =

Card game

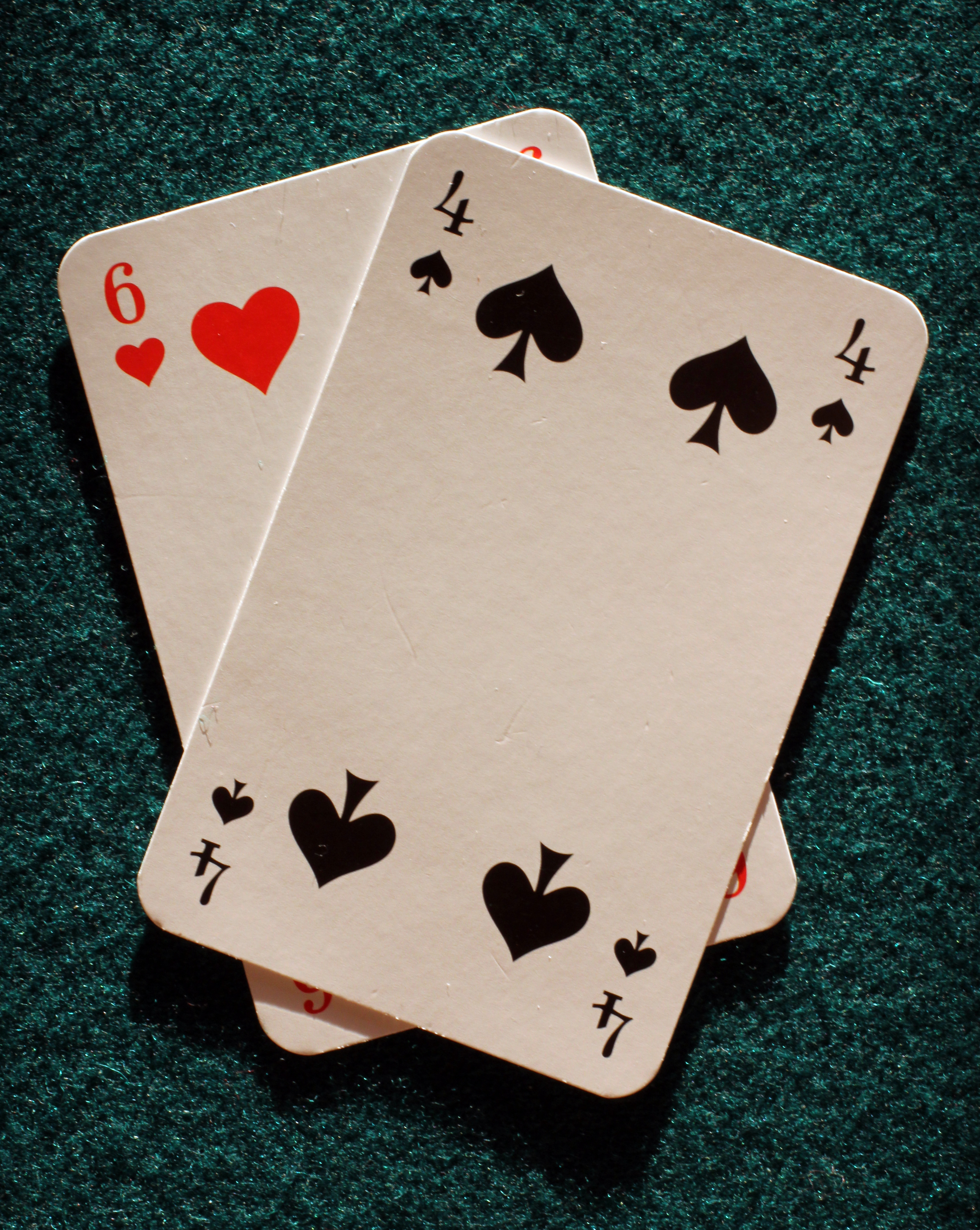
- 6 of Hearts and 4 of Clubs played to a trick
- Origin: Germany
- Alternative names: Tod und Leben, Leben und Tod
- Type: Capturing
- Players: 2
- Age range: 5-6
- Cards: 32
- Deck: Piquet or Skat pack
- Rank (high→low): A K Q J 10 9 8 7 A K O U 10 9 8 7
- Play: Alternate
- Playing time: 5 min.
- Chance: Mainly luck

Related games
- Battle or War
- Very easy to play. No trumps.

Bettelmann ("Beggar Man") or Tod und Leben ("Death and Life") (Note: Gööck gives the alternative name of Woina Wize which may be Russian, in which case Woina means "war" which the meaning of Wize is uncertain.) is a simple, trick-taking card game for 2 players that is suitable for children. Bettelmann is of German origin and is mentioned as early as 1841. It closely resembles Battle.

== Rules ==
The rules appear to have changed little in over a century. The following are based on Pierer (1841), Gööck (1967) and Müller (1994).

The game is usually played by children and originally used a 32-card German-suited pack (Pierer and Gööck); later rules (Feder and Müller) only cite French-suited cards. Both players are given 16 cards, unseen, which they place face down in front of them. Non-dealer plays top card to the table, face up. Dealer then plays top card as well. Cards rank in their natural order and the trick is taken by the highest ranking card, regardless of suit. The trick winner adds the trick to the bottom of the pile. If the two cards are the same rank, they remain in place and are captured by the winner of the next trick (Pierer) or the player who played the first card wins (Gööck, Müller). The latter suggests that the trick winner leads to the next trick although this is nowhere stated by either source. The first player to run out of cards is the Beggar (Bettelmann) and loses the game.

Pierer adds the rule that a player down to the last 3 cards may look at them and (presumably) play them in any order to the next trick(s). If that person wins a trick such that more than 3 cards are held again, the player turns cards face down and the trick is placed at the bottom of the pile. Pierer also adds that "if more than two play, the cards are dealt and played in the same way".

== Tod und Leben ==
In some sources the rules for Tod und Leben are identical to those of Bettelmann. However, Feder (1980), Gööck (1967), Müller (1994) and Ethische Kultur (1893) all state that, in Tod und Leben, the cards are first divided into those of the red suits - the Goodies (die Guten) or Life (Leben) - and those of the black suits - the Baddies (die Bösen) or Death (Tod). One player plays with the reds and the other with the blacks. The highest-ranking card wins the trick regardless of suit; if equal ranking cards are played, they are left in situ and taken by the winner of the next trick. The overall winner is the first one to capture all the cards.

== Literature ==
- _ (1893). Ethische Kultur: Halbmonatsschrift für Ethisch-Soziale Reformen. Volume 1. Berlin: Ferd. Dümmler.
- Feder, Jan (1980). Die schönsten Kartenspiele: Über 100 Variationen mit dem Skatblatt. 2nd edn. Droemersche Verlagsanstalt Th. Kanur Nachf., Freising. ISBN 3-426-07628-4
- Gööck, Roland (1967). Freude am Kartenspiel, Bertelsmann, Gütersloh.
- Müller, Reiner F. (1994). Die bekanntesten Kartenspiele. Berlin: Neff. ISBN 3-8118-5856-4
- Pierer, H. A. (1841). Supplemente zum Universal-Lexikon oder Encyclopädischem Wörterbuch der Wissenschaften, Künste und Gewerbe, Vol. 1, Aa-Bronchophonie. Altenburg: Pierer.
