= Snipp =

Village in Sweden

Coordinates: 65°13′36″N 20°19′46″E

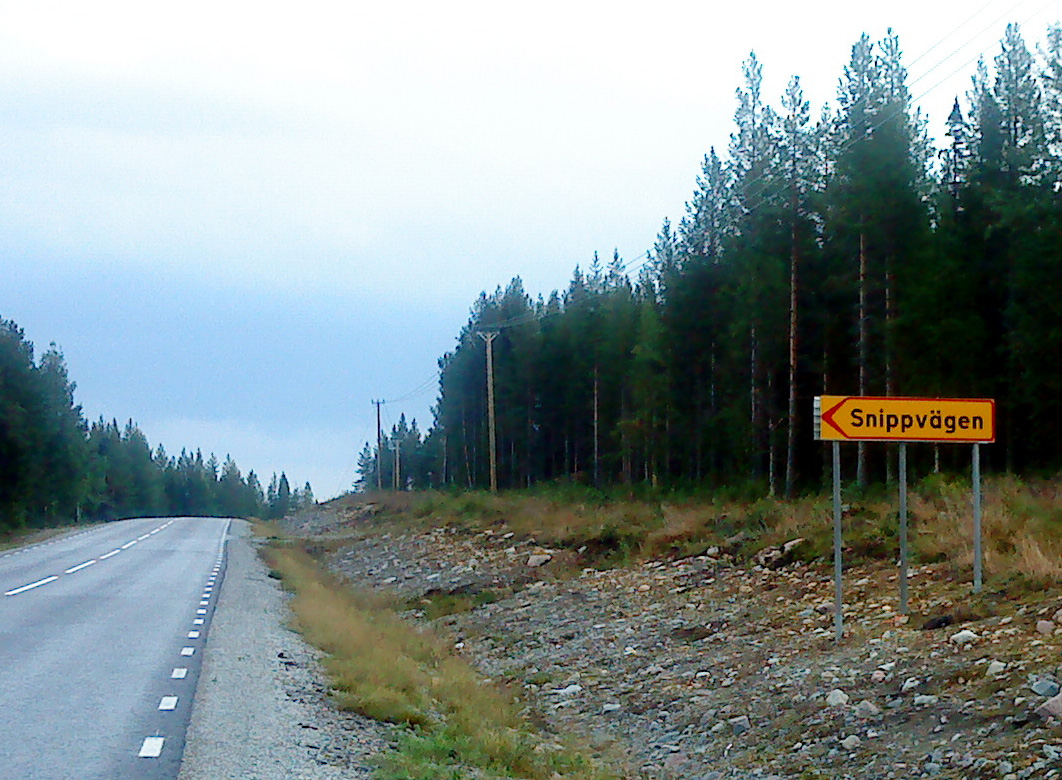
Snippvägen, near Jörn.

Snipp is a village in Jörns socken, Skellefteå Municipality, Västerbotten County, Sweden. The village's population has repeatedly declined and as of the start of the 21st century, there are no longer any permanent residents there.

The village got its name in the 19th century when a geographical surveyor played with the childish rhyme Snipp, snapp, snorum, hej basalorum. Snapp, Snorum, Hej and Basalorum are four other villages in the vicinity.
