= Taco Cat Goat Cheese Pizza =

Dedicated deck card game

- Publishers: Dolphin Hat Games
- Genres: Dedicated deck card game
- Players: 2 to 8
- Playing time: 10 minutes
- Age range: 8+

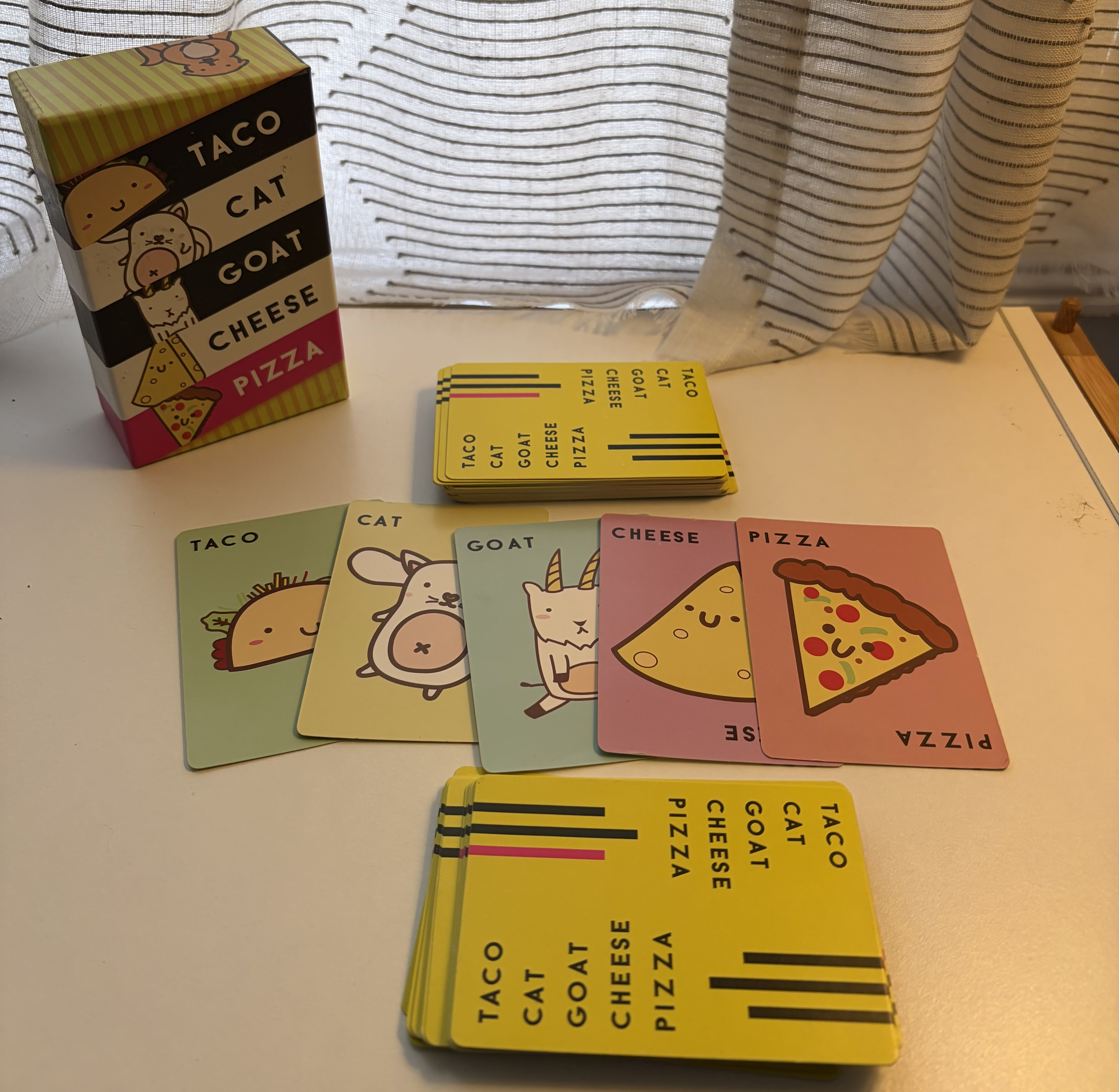
Box and cards

Taco Cat Goat Cheese Pizza (TCGCP) is a shedding-type card game with a dedicated deck created by Dolphin Hat Games. It launched in 2017, targeted toward families, and grew in popularity during the COVID-19 pandemic.

== History ==
Taco Cat Goat Cheese Pizza launched in 2017 when Dolphin Hat Games founder Dave Campbell created it based on Egyptian Ratscrew. It grew in popularity through TikTok videos during the COVID-19 pandemic.

Taco Cat Goat Cheese Pizza was named the official game of the 2022 FIFA World Cup.

== Gameplay ==
External videos
- Official gameplay tutorial video on YouTube

Taco Cat Goat Cheese Pizza is a shedding game, where each player starts with a hand of cards and aims to be the first player to discard all their cards.

The game is recommended for 2–8 players ages eight and up, and it is estimated to take about 10 minutes. There are 64 cards in a deck, with eight types of cards: Taco, Cat, Goat, Cheese, Pizza, Gorilla, Groundhog, and Narwhal. Each card says its name and has a simple illustration of the object or animal.

The deck is shuffled and dealt evenly to all players, with players' cards kept face down in a draw pile placed in front of them. The person to left of the dealer flips the top card in their deck outward to form the central pile, saying "Taco." The next player to their left does the same, saying, "Cat." Players say, "Taco," "Cat," "Goat," "Cheese," and "Pizza," in order as they place their cards. This continues until a player happens to say the name of the card they play—this is called a match. At this point, all players must slap the top of the central pile, and the last player to do so must take the entire pile and add it to the bottom of their deck. Play then continues as normal.

When a player runs out of cards, they must continue to say the right words in turn, and still slap the central pile at the appropriate times. The game ends when a player with no remaining cards is the first to correctly slap a match or special card.

Players are not allowed to flinch (slap or start to slap the pile when the correct card has not been played), break a steady playing pace, or look at their card before playing it. Doing any of these results in the player forfeiting the round and picking up the cards in the discard pile.

=== Special cards ===
There are three special cards which, when played, require all players to complete their corresponding actions before slapping the pile, regardless of what word was just said. A player picks up the central pile after a special card is played if they are the last to slap the pile or if they do not complete the action correctly before slapping it. These cards are:

- Gorilla: All players beat their chests.
- Groundhog: All players slap both hands on the table.
- Narwhal: All players form a "horn" above their heads with both hands.

=== Children's Book ===
A book based on the game, titled Taco Cat Goat Cheese Pizza and the Case of the Missing Hat was published in 2024. The graphic novel was written by Jenna Schroeder and illustrated by Yamerpro.
