= Ninety-nine (addition card game) =

Card game

Ninety-Nine
- A 9 always takes the score to 99 points
- Type: Addingup-type
- Players: 2+
- Cards: 52 (additional decks may be used)
- Deck: French
- Rank (high→low): K Q J 10 9 8 7 6 5 4 3 2 A
- Play: Both directions
- Playing time: 15 min.
- Chance: Low-Moderate

Related games
- Switch

Ninety-nine is a simple card game based on addition and reportedly popular among the Romani people. It uses one or more standard decks of Anglo-American playing cards in which certain ranks have special properties, and can be played by any number of players. During the game, the value of each card played is added to a running total which is not allowed to exceed 99. A player who cannot play without causing this total to surpass 99 loses that hand and must forfeit one token.

Due to the simple strategy and focus on basic addition, the game is sometimes used to cultivate math skills in children.

== Rules ==
=== Preliminaries ===
At the start of the game, three tokens are distributed to each player.

=== Standard rules of play ===
Each hand, three cards are dealt to each player, and the player to the left of the dealer takes the first turn by choosing one of the cards in their hand, places it on the discard pile, calls out its value, and then draws a new card. The player to the left then chooses one of their cards and places it on the discard pile, adds its value to the previous card and calls out the new total.

If a player forgets to draw a new card before the next player plays, that player must remain one card short for the remainder of the hand.

Play proceeds in this manner until a player cannot play without making the total value exceed ninety-nine. That player loses the deal and must turn in or discard one of their tokens, after which all cards are then collected and a new hand is dealt. Once a player runs out of tokens, that player is out of the game. The last player remaining, i.e. the last player with token(s), wins the game.

Cards of certain ranks have special values or properties, which are:

- A: value is either 1 or 11.
- 3: value is 3 and the next player loses a turn.
- 4: value is 0 and the order of play is reversed.
  - Once the game is down to two players, whoever played a 4 takes another turn instead.
- 9: value is 99 regardless of the previous total value.
- 10: value is either -10 or +10.
- J: value is 10.
- Q: value is 10.
- K: value is 0.
  - This means that the previous pile value remains unchanged, therefore a K can be thought of as a pass.
  - Some rule variations swap the effects of the K and the 9 (see alternate rules below).

All other cards have their face value.

=== Alternative rules of play ===
Alternate rules allow use of the Joker cards and rank the cards as follows:

- A: value is either 1 or 11.
- 4: value is 0 and the order of play is reversed.
- 9: value is 0 and can be thought of as a pass.
- 10: value is -10.
  - This means that whoever played a ten cannot choose to increase total value by 10.
- J: value is 10.
- Q: value is 10.
- K: value is 99 regardless of the previous total value.

All other cards have their face value.

A scoring variation uses dollar bills or pieces of paper instead of tokens. Each time a player loses the deal, their dollar bill is folded. Five folds are allowed: all corners, then in half, after which that player is out. The last player remaining wins and takes all the dollar bills.

=== Other variants ===
==== Chicago variation ====
Chicago variation follows the standard rules but with these differences:

- 9: value is 0 and the next player loses a turn.
- 10: value is -10.
- K: value is 99 regardless of the previous total value.

==== Hawaiian variation ====
Hawaii variation follows the standard rules but with these differences:

- 5: value is -5.
- 10: value is -10.
- J: value is 99 regardless of the previous total value.

==== Icelandic variation ====
Iceland variation follows the standard rules but with these differences:

- A: value is either 1 or 14.
- 5: value is 5 and the next player loses a turn.
  - In this rule variation, threes have their face value.
- 7: value is 7 and the order of play is reversed.
- 9: value is 99 regardless of the previous total value.
- J: value is 11.
- Q: value is 0 and the next player cannot pick up unless they also play a queen.
  - If two or more queens are played in succession, the first player unable to play a queen must play a number of cards equal to the number of queens played, and may not pick up.
- K: value is 0.

==== Michigan variation ====
Any time a player gets three of kind, that player can lay it down, call out and all the other players have to fold a corner of the dollar bill. The hand is ended and the next one is dealt. Also, when one player cannot play because the score is 99, that player drops out and play continues with the remaining players.

Should a player run out of cards completely due to forgetting to draw, that player loses the hand the next time they would have to play a card.

==== Taiwanese variation ====
Taiwan variation follows the standard rules, but with differences in that 5 cards are dealt to each player, along with these:

- A: value is 1.
  - Ace of Spades: value is 0 regardless of the previous total value.
- 3: value is 3.
- 4: value is 0 and the order of play is reversed.
- 5: value is 0 and whoever played it may choose another player to take the next turn.
- 9: value is 9.
- 10: value is either -10 or +10.
- J: value is 0 and can be thought of as a pass.
- Q: value is either -20 or +20.
- K: value is 99 regardless of the previous total value.

==== Baltimore variation ====
Baltimore variation follows the standard rules, but with differences in that cards of certain ranks have special values or properties, as shown below:

- A: value is 1.
- 3: value is 0 and the order of play is reversed.
- 6: value is 6 and player steals a card from another player. The stolen player draws a new card from the deck.
- 7: value is equal to the card played last. If a 5 was played before a 7, the 7 adds 5.
  - If a special card was played before a 7, the 7 gets to use the powers of the card. For instance, if a 3 was played before a 7, the 7 gains the special power of a 3 so the value is 0 and the order of play is reversed.
- 8: value is 2.
- 9: value is 0.
  - Therefore, the previous pile value remains unchanged and can be thought of as a pass.
- 10: value is -10.
- one-eyed J: value is 99 regardless of previous total value.
  - Every regulation deck of cards has 2 one-eyed Jacks and 2 two-eyed Jacks. Only one-eyed Jacks have this power. Two-eyed jacks are worth 10.
- Q: value is 10.
- K: value is 10.
  - If a player has 2 kings, 2 queens, or one king and one queen, those can be combined and their value is still 10. Then the player can draw two more cards.

All other cards have their face value.

==== Nepal variation ====
Nepal variation follows the standard rules but with these differences:

- A: value is 1 or 11.
- 2: value is 99 regardless of the previous total value.
- 9: value is 0.
- 10: value is -10 or +10.
- J: value is 10.
- Q: value is 10.
- K: value is 10.

All other cards have their face value.

==== JBB variations ====
JBB variations follow the Icelandic rules but with these incremental differences:

===== Lincoln 2018 =====
If a player is unable to lay a card following a queen, any remaining penalty carries over to the next player.

===== St Albans 2019 =====
- 6: value is 8
- 8: value is 6

===== Norwich 2022 =====
One joker (?) is introduced into the pack:

- ?: value is 99 and the order of play is reversed.

===== Whitby 2025 =====
If two consecutive value cards are played, the next player must continue the run to pick up.

- Runs use the original face value of a card, not the numerical value used to adjust the total.
- The sequence wraps and can decrease so that A following K, or K following A starts a sequence.
- If a player starts a new sequence (changing the run direction), they are still allowed to pick up.

==== Summary ====
Table caption
Variant	Special	A	2	3	4	5	6	7	8	9	10	J	Q	K	Joker
Standard	N	1 or 11	2	3 & skip	0 & reverse	5	6	7	8	99	+/-10	10	10	0	unused
Alternate	N	1 or 11	2	3	0 & reverse	5	6	7	8	0	-10	10	10	99	unused
Chicago	N	1 or 11	2	3 & skip	0 & reverse	5	6	7	8	0 & skip	-10	10	10	99	unused
Hawaiian	N	1 or 11	2	3 & skip	0 & reverse	-5	6	7	8	99	-10	99	10	0	unused
Icelandic	Y (see link)	1 or 14	2	3	0 & reverse	5 & skip	6	7 & reverse	8	99	+/-10	11	0	0	unused
Taiwanese	Y (see link)	1	2	3	0 & reverse	0 & choose	6	7	8	9	+/-10	0	+/-20	99	unused
Baltimore	Y (see link)	1	2	3 & reverse	0 & reverse	5	6 & steal	last or 7	2	0	-10	10 or 99 (one eyed)	10	10	unused
Nepal	N	1 or 11	99	3	0 & reverse	5	6	7	8	0	+/-10	10	10	10	unused
JBB	Y (see link)	1 or 14	2	3	0 & reverse	5 & skip	8	7 & reverse	6	99	+/-10	11	0	0	99 & reverses

== Strategy ==
During each round of the game, the running total will eventually climb to 99, and once it has, it is not likely to decrease very much before someone is unable to play. The game's strategy, therefore, revolves around cultivating a hand that can survive for as long as possible once ninety-nine is reached. This consists of saving 10s, 4s, 9s, and kings while playing cards of large value. Another strategy is to raise the total to 99 early by use of the required card (usually a 9 or King depending on house rules) in the hopes of catching another player unprepared.

Strategy and rationale for keeping cards of various values ("the long game" where 99 is reached slowly)

- Least valuable: 5, 6, 7, 8 have no long-term value
- Worth considering: Ace, 2, 3, can be used effectively when the score is in the high 90s. The Ace potential value of 11 is almost never of strategic value.
- Most underrated: Jack and Queen. If someone plays a 10 (minus 10) against a 99, these will push it right back to 99
- Overrated: King only buys you one extra turn, hardly better than a 9 at end-of-game play. If you are forced to play a high-value card, prefer to throw out a King in favor of keeping a 4 or 10 in reserve.
- Most valuable: 4. Playing 4 (reversal) when the score is 99 buys you the most number of turns until you have to confront the 99 score

Strategy for the bold move ("the short game" where you play a 99 value card on the first hand)

- If you have a 99 value card and two other high-value cards (4, 10, King) then you already have the "best" possible hand and waiting to play the 99 value card is pointless.

== Commercial versions ==
Gamewright Games publishes a commercial version of Ninety-Nine called Zeus On The Loose with a purpose-built deck which has suitless cards numbered from 1 through 10. Cards depicting Greek deities have special functions, e.g. playing Poseidon subtracts 10 from the current count. This version also introduces a Zeus token which can be "stolen" under certain circumstances. The person holding Zeus at the end of a round wins that round; the action that ends the round can cause the player performing that action to steal Zeus and win the round. The first player to win four rounds wins the game.

ONO 99 is a version of Ninety-Nine published by Mattel, using a deck similar to Uno.

Boom-O, also by Mattel, is a bomb-themed variant of Ninety-Nine. Players must keep the running countdown timer at 60 seconds or fewer in order to guard their bomb tokens from "exploding".

== See also ==
- Slapjack
- Egyptian Ratscrew
