= Zehnerlegen =

Card game

Zehneranlegen
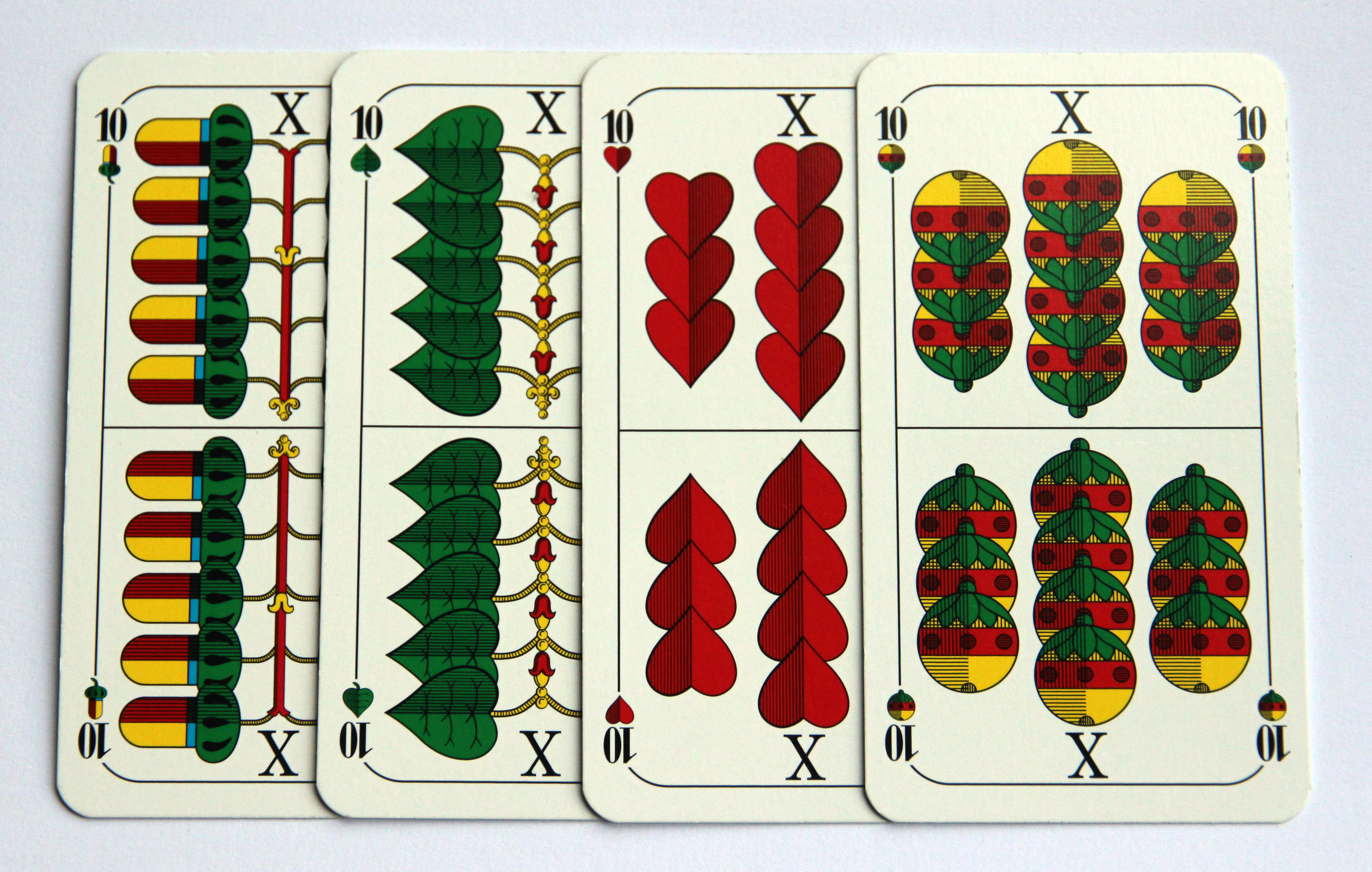
- The Tens in a Bavarian pack
- Origin: Bavaria
- Type: Shedding game
- Players: 4
- Age range: 6+
- Cards: 32
- Deck: Bavarian pattern
- Rank (high→low): A K O U 10 9 8 7
- Play: Clockwise

Related games
- Domino • Sevens • Unteranlegen

Zehnerlegen, Zehneranlegen or Zehner-Auflegen is a card game of the Domino family that is usually played with German-suited cards of the Bavarian pattern, the aim of which is to be first to shed all one's cards. It is thus a shedding-type card game. The name means "laying tens" and refers to the Tens (Zehner) which are the first card in each suit to be played to the table. It is played in Bavaria and in the Austrian state of Burgenland.

== Playing ==
Zehnerlegen is usually played by four players using 32 cards of a German-suited, Bavarian pattern pack. Cards rank in their natural order which, from lowest to highest, is 7 - 8 - 9 - 10 - Unter- Ober - King - Sow (Deuce, Ace). By the end of the game the cards must laid out on the table by suits in this order.

After the cards have been thoroughly shuffled by the dealer, rearhand may cut the pack without looking at the card. The dealer then deals the cards clockwise, either individually or in 4 packets of two cards or in any other suitable combination, ensuring that each player ends up with eight cards. The objective of the game is to shed all one's cards before everyone else. Cards are played face up to the table. Play begins with the player holding the Ten of Acorns placing this card on the table. The next player in clockwise order must now play an Acorn that is one rank higher or lower or, alternatively, one of the other Tens. Play continues in this fashion with cards being added in strict suit sequence to the table. Tens may be played at any time and each Ten starts a new suit sequence. If a player cannot play a card, he must pass. The first player to get rid of all his cards wins. The player who is next to shed all his cards comes second and so on. Scoring may be in hard (monetary) or soft score (points).

== Literature ==
- Geiser, Remigius (2004). "100 Kartenspiele des Landes Salzburg" (PDF) (in German). Austro-Hungarian Playing-Card Association, Vienna/Budapest. Archived from the original (PDF) on 27 August 2018.
