= Boom-O =

Boom-O is a card game from the Ninety-Nine family of games. Boom-O is from the makers of Uno, Mattel. The aim is to keep the timer below 60 seconds. Otherwise, the player may "blow up".

== Gameplay ==
Each player is dealt 7 cards and three time bomb cards called "lives". Most of the cards in the deck either increase or decrease the timer total of points in the game. Other cards in the pack include similar Uno commands such as Skip, Reverse, Draw 1 or 2 and Trade Hands. Players put down one card per turn attempting to decrease the number of cards in their hand while keeping the timer total under 60 seconds. If a player can't play a card, they must turn over one of their three time bombs, losing a life. If a player clears all cards in their hand, all other players flip one of their time bombs rendering them the winner. Whoever has all three of their time bomb cards flipped over is out of the game. The survivor wins.

== See also ==
- Ninety-nine (addition card game)
