= Felchta =

- Ortsteil of Mühlhausen
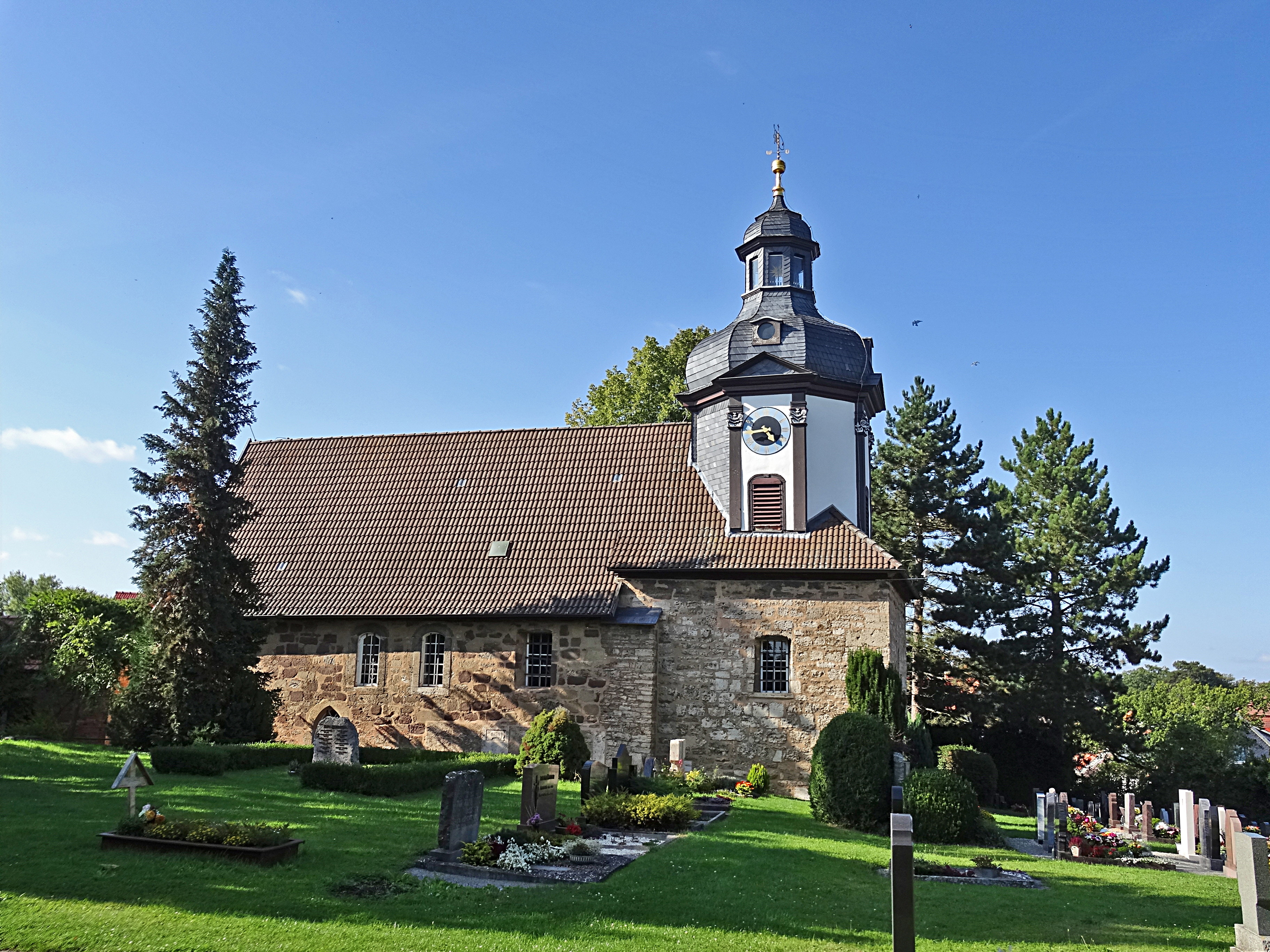
- St Peter's Church, Felchta
- Interactive map of Felchta
- Location within Germany Location within Thuringia
- Coordinates: 51.19193°N 10.44413°E
- Country: Germany
- State: Thuringia
- District: Unstrut-Hainich-Kreis
- Town: Mühlhausen
- First mentioned: 876

Government
  - Mayor: René Seyfert
- Elevation: 212 m (696 ft)

Population (March 2021)
  - Total: 626
- Time zone: UTC+01:00 (CET)
  - Summer (DST): UTC+02:00 (CEST)
- Postal codes: 99974
- Dialling codes: 03601
- Vehicle registration: UH, LSZ, MHL
- Website: muehlhausen.de

Felchta (pronounced [ˈfɛlçta]) is a village and quarter of the town of Mühlhausen in Thuringia, central Germany.

== Geography ==
Felchta is located on the southern edge of the town of Mühlhausen. The Landesstraße ("state road") L 1016 runs past the village and connects it with the town and the surrounding area. Felchta lies in the Thuringian Basin not far from the Unstrut river in an agricultural area. There is hardly any forest in the intensively used gently undulating terrain. The climate is mild, with low precipitation with mostly groundwater-influenced soils.

== History ==
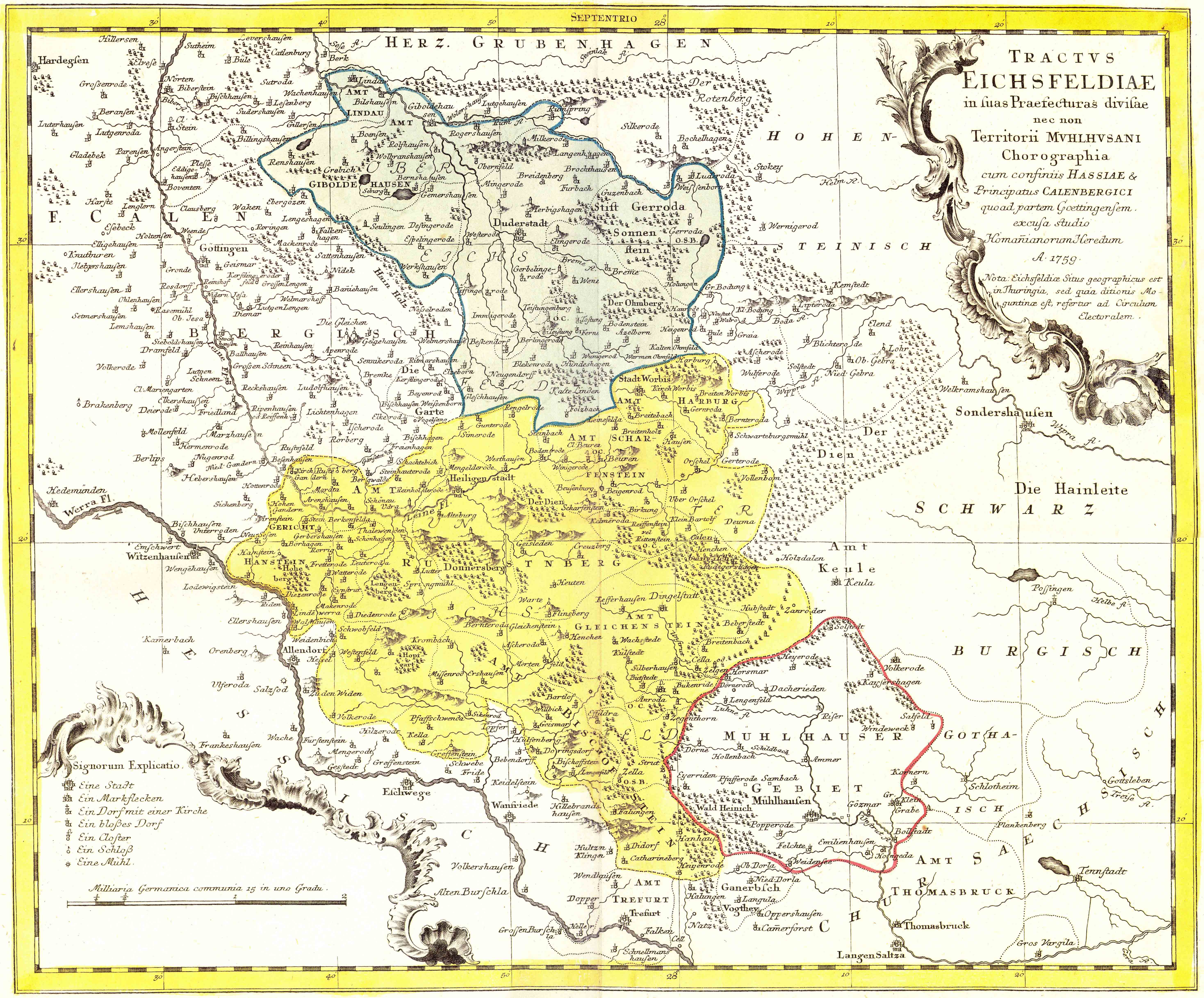
The Eichsfeld region and the territory of Reichsstadt (imperial city) Mühlhausen with Felchte (Felchta) around 1759 (the map contains some errors)

Felchta was first mentioned in a document on 18 May 876. For centuries, it belonged to the sphere of influence of the imperial city of Mühlhausen. In 1565, there were 45 (male) inhabitants in Felchta.

In 1802, Felchta, together with Mühlhausen, fell to the Kingdom of Prussia, from 1807 to 1813 to the Kingdom of Westphalia (canton Dorla) created by Napoleon, and after the Congress of Vienna in 1816, it was assigned to the district of Mühlhausen i. Th. in the Prussian province of Saxony. On 9 April 1994, the village, which at that time had 842 inhabitants, was incorporated into the town of Mühlhausen.

== Sights ==
- St Peter's Church, Felchta

== Notable people ==
- Roland Gööck (1923–1991), editor and non-fiction author
- Wolfgang Thiel (born 14 March 1948 in Felchta), politician (The Left)
