= Ristiseiska =

Finnish card game

Ristiseiska is a popular card game in Finland for three to five players. The goal is to use up all of the cards in a player's hand. Rectangular grids of cards are built according to specific rules. It is a version of the card game Domino.

The person holding the seven of clubs begins, and play proceeds clockwise. The players must play from their hands, if possible, on their turn, and if they cannot, they must say lappu and take a card from the previous player. Upon playing a king or an ace, the player can also choose to play an additional card. The first player to run out of cards wins.

The game can be played in rounds, adding up scores from individuals rounds until a set point number is reached. Winners get zero points, while other players get points depending on the values of their remaining cards.

== Example of play ==
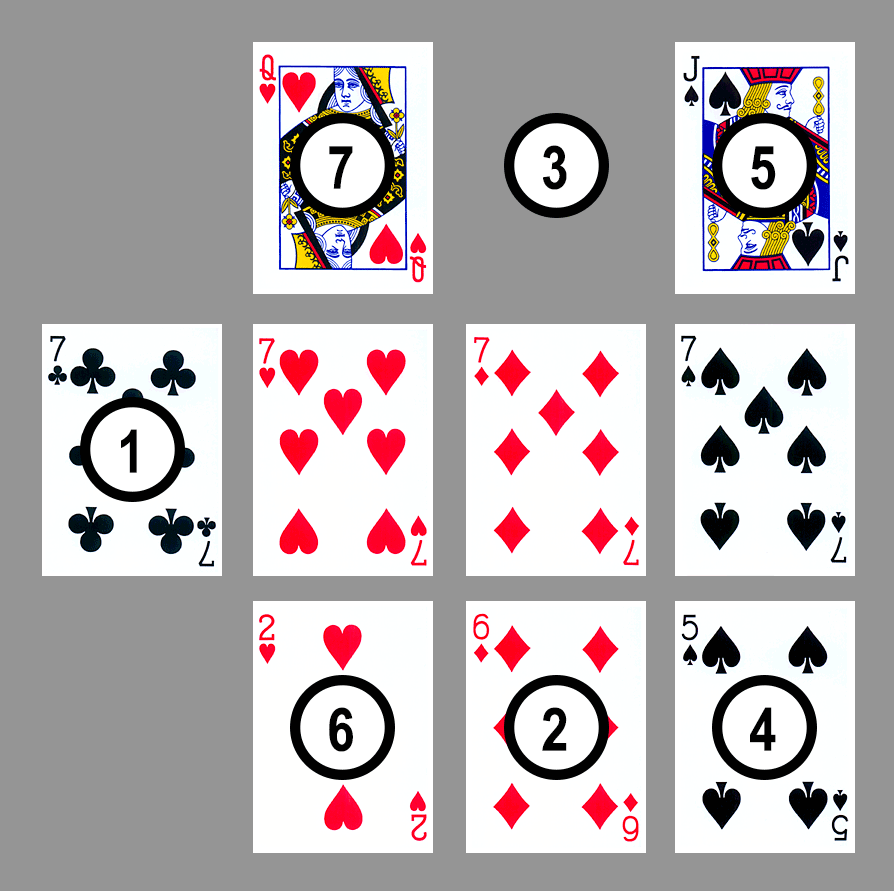
Illustration of example

1. The player holding the Seven of Clubs starts the game by placing it on the table.
2. The following players can play sevens of other suits or the Six of Clubs.
3. An eight can only be placed on top of a seven once the six of the same suit has been played first. Similarly, a five cannot be placed on top of a six until the eight of that same suit is on the table.
4. Once both the eight and the six are below the seven, players can place cards in numerical order. A five is played on the six, and a nine is played on the eight.
5. Cards are played in numerical order: a nine goes on the eight, then 10, then Jack, and finally Queen.
6. If a three is on the table and a player has the two of that suit, they can either "cap" the pile with the two (flip the pile over) or simply leave the two on the table. If they cap it, the Ace becomes number 14. If they leave the card on the table, the Ace is number 1. If a player caps a pile, they may play another card or choose not to.
7. If a Queen is on the table and a player has the King of that suit, they can cap the pile with the King or leave it on the table. If they cap it, the Ace becomes number 1. If they leave it on the table, the Ace is number 14. If a player caps a pile, they may play another card or choose not to.
