= Snap (card game) =

Card game where players watch for matching cards

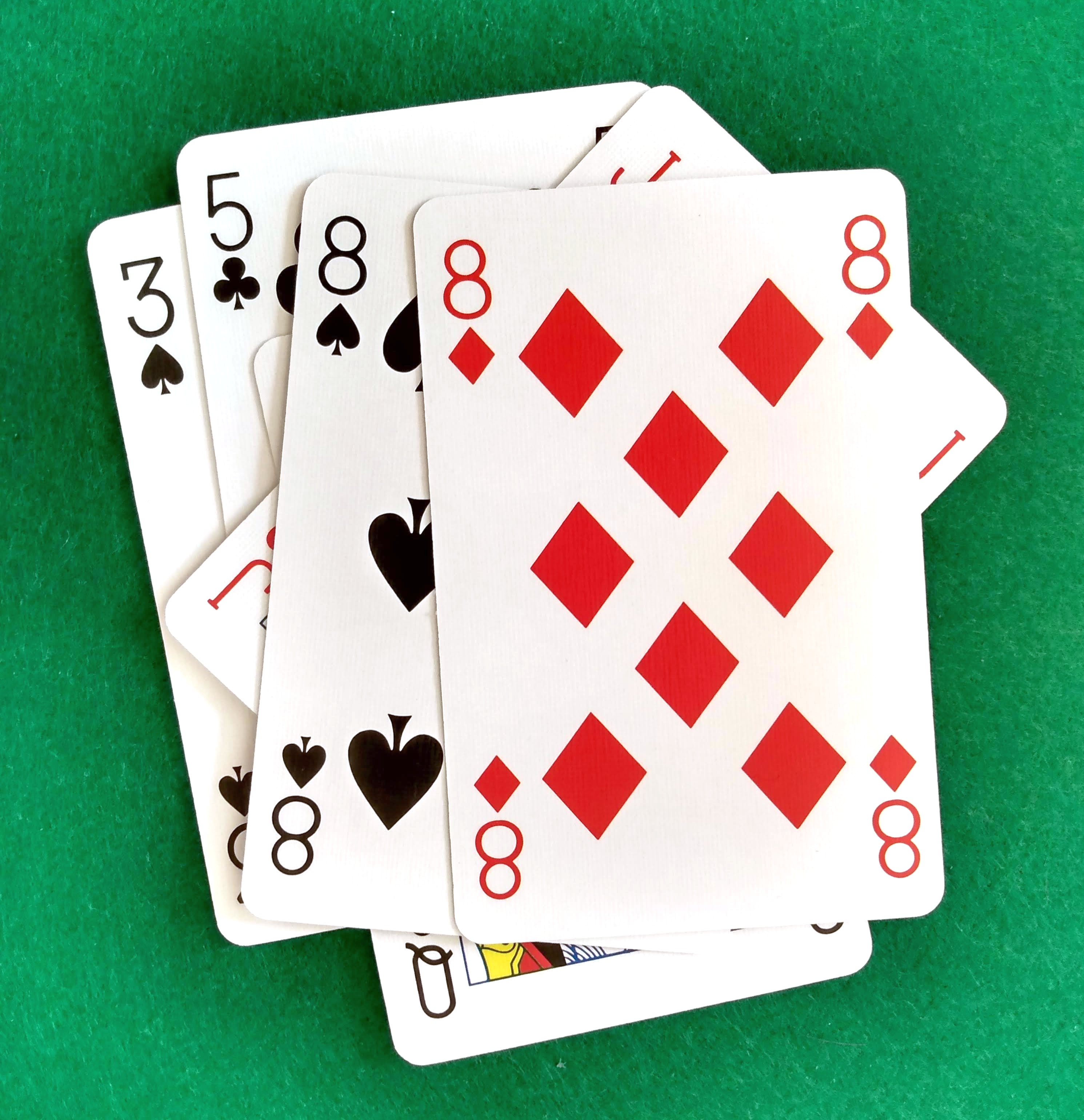
- Snap played with a single pile: two eights in a row is a "snap"
- Type: Matching
- Players: 2–8
- Skills: Quick reactions
- Cards: 52
- Deck: French-suited
- Rank (high→low): A K Q J 10 9 8 7 6 5 4 3 2
- Play: Clockwise
- Playing time: 5 minutes
- Chance: Low-Moderate

Related games
- Beggar-My-Neighbour, Slapjack

Snap is a card game in which players deal cards and react quickly to spot pairs of cards of the same rank. Cards are either dealt into separate piles around the table, one per player, or (particularly when played with young children) into a single shared pile. The game may be a simplified version of the older Snip Snap Snorem.

== The game ==
The pack of cards is dealt out among the players in face-down stacks as equally as possible. Play proceeds with the players taking it in turns to remove a card from the top of their stack and place it face-up on a pile alongside it. If two cards on the tops of any of these piles have matching values (eg. two fives or two kings), the first player to shout "Snap!" takes both face-up piles and adds them to the bottom of their own stack. The player who accumulates all the cards wins.

A "snap pool" is created from matching stacks if two players shout "Snap!" at the exact same time, or from a player's own stack if they shout "Snap!" in error. Players can shout "Snap pool!" instead of "Snap!" if the matching cards also match the pool, and may take the pool for doing so. (If multiple players call "snap pool", the newly matching cards are also added to the pool.)

== Variations ==
Cards can be played onto a single shared stack, and players call "snap!" if two consecutive cards on this pile are identical. This makes the game easier for younger children. In this version, players may race to call "snap" while slapping the central pile, making the game similar to Slapjack.

A variation called "Menagerie" assigns each player an animal, and requires players to shout the name of animal corresponding to the player who laid a matching card in order to win the pile.

The game is often one of the first card games to be taught to children and is often played with special packs of cards featuring popular children's characters from television programmes or recent films.

== In other cultures ==
In Germany and Austria, the game is known as Schnipp-Schnapp or Spitz, pass auf!

== See also ==
- One Card (card game)

== Literature ==
- Gööck, Roland (1967). Freude am Kartenspiel : Spielregeln für die 100 beliebtesten Kartenspiele und Spielarten (in German). Gütersloh: Bertelsmann. OCLC 985604039.
