= Snorum =

Village in Sweden

Coordinates: 65°17′04″N 20°04′37″E

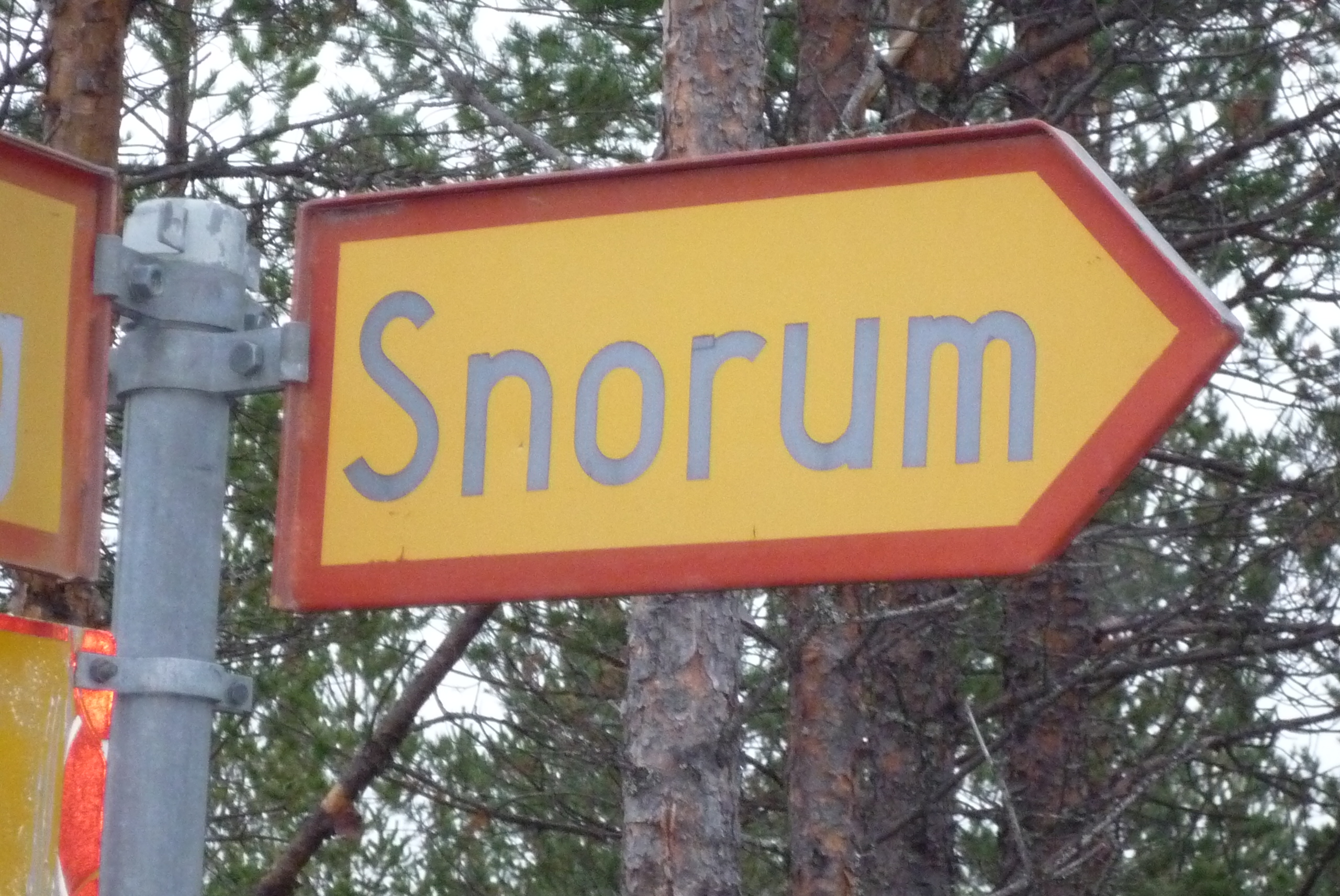
An old road sign, showing the way to abandoned village of Snorum, Jörn, Skellefteå, north Sweden

Snorum is a village, nowadays more like a farm, in Jörns socken, Skellefteå Municipality, Västerbotten County, Sweden.

The village got its name in the 19th century when a geographical surveyor played with the childish rhyme Snipp, snapp, snorum, hej basalorum and named five new populated places in the Jörn Parish each after a word in the rhyme. Snipp, Snapp, Hej and Basalorum are four other villages in the vicinity.
