= Hej =

Village in Sweden

Coordinates: 65°20′40″N 20°01′07″E

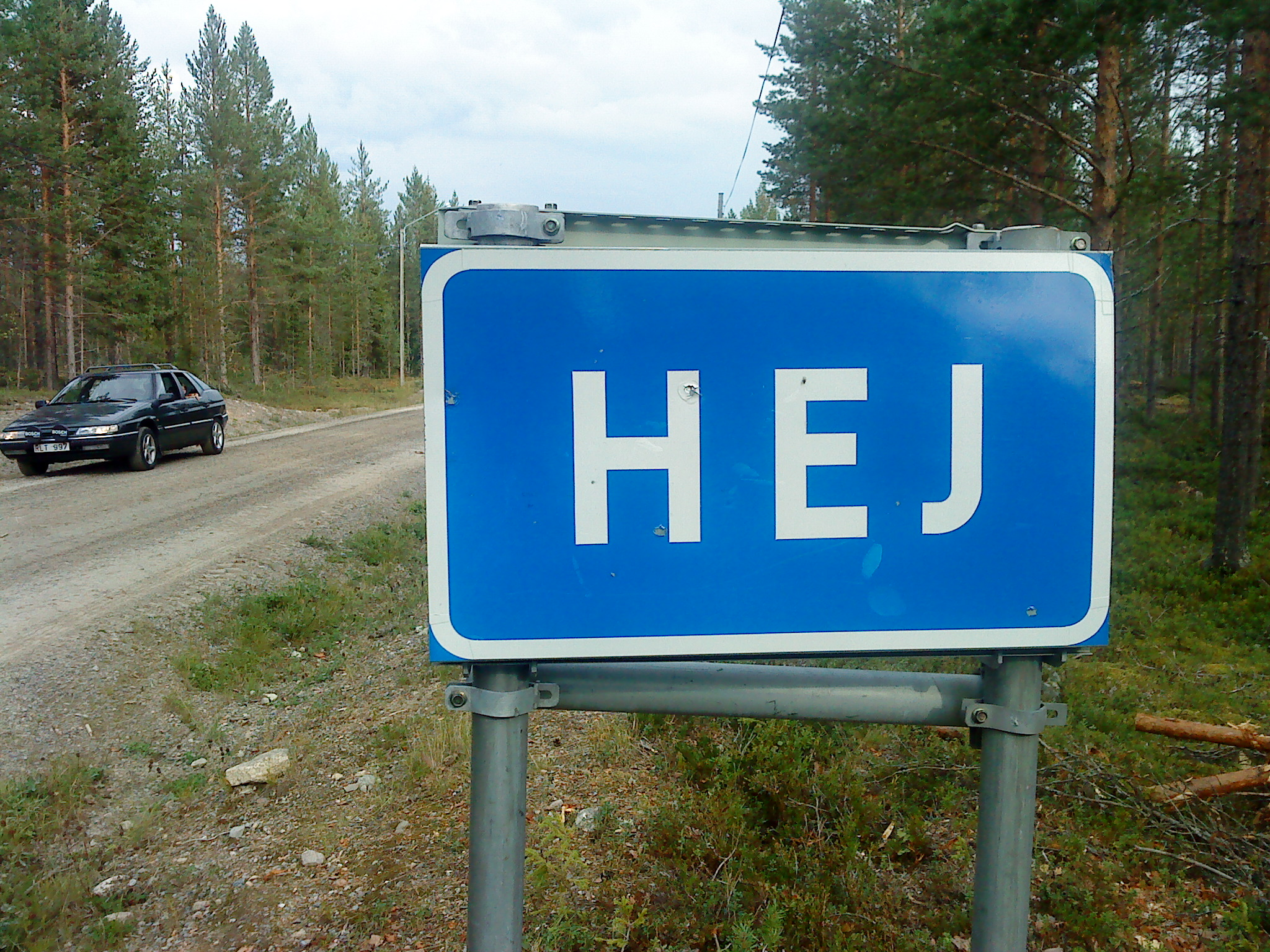
A place name sign in Hej.

Hej is a village in Jörns socken in the north-west part of Skellefteå Municipality, Västerbotten County, Sweden.

The word Hej is the most common greeting in the Swedish language, and the equivalent of 'hi' in English. The village was named in the 19th century when a surveyor played with the childish rhyme Snipp, snapp, snorum, hej basalorum. Snipp, Snapp, Snorum and Basalorum are four other villages in the vicinity.
