= ONO 99 =

Card game

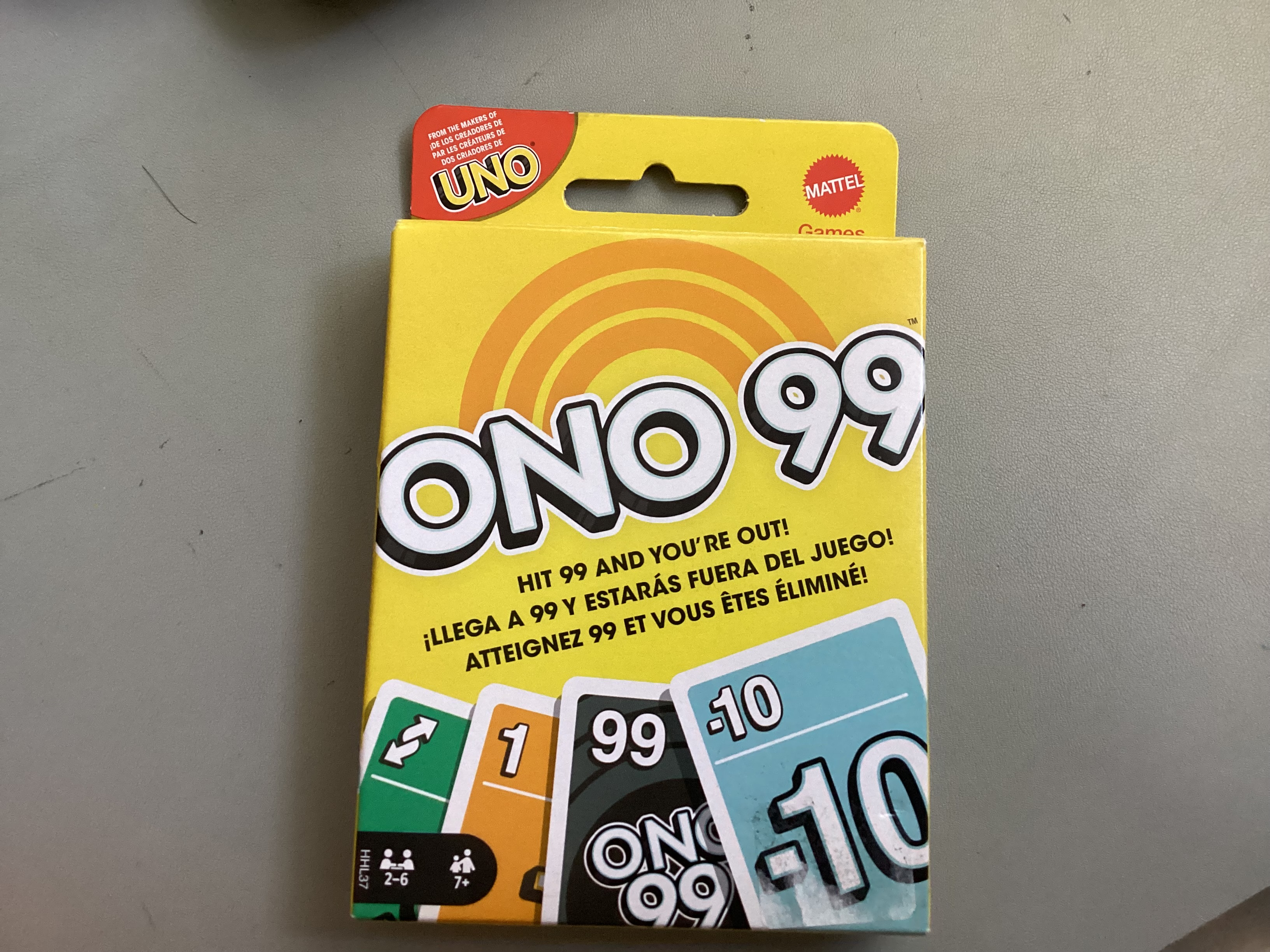
- The 2022 version box
- Type: Adding game
- Players: 2-6
- Age range: 7+
- Cards: 54

ONO 99 (previously published as O'NO 99 by International Games, Inc.) is a proprietary adding game produced by Mattel and based on the public-domain card game Ninety-nine. It is played with a dedicated deck of 54 cards (112 cards in the 2022 edition).

The object of the game is to play as many number cards as possible while keeping the total value of discarded cards below 99. Similar to the game UNO, ONO 99 has special cards such as Reverse, Hold, and Double Play cards that can alter gameplay.

== Gameplay ==
The game is played by three to eight players. Each player picks a card from the deck, and the player who drew the highest-numbered card becomes the dealer (Hold, Reverse and Double Play each count as 0), who then deals four cards to each player, and places the remainder of the deck face down in the center of the play area. The player to the dealer's left starts the hand by playing any numbered card face up beside the deck, forming a discard pile, and announces the number. That player must then immediately draw the top card from the deck. Each subsequent player does likewise, announcing a new total by adding the value of the card they played to the previous player's total. Play continues clockwise between players until one player is unable to play a card without causing the total value of the discard pile to reach or exceed 99; that player loses the hand and will start the next hand.

In addition to number cards (2 to 10 in the original 1980 edition; 0 to 10 in the 2022 edition), five special types of cards are present in the deck, which may be used to attack opponents or benefit the player using them:

- Minus 10: Deducts 10 points from the discard pile value. This card may be played to cause the total value to go negative; for example, if Minus 10 is the first card played, the next player faces a total of -10. In the 2022 edition, negative totals are no longer allowed.
- Hold: Leaves the total unaffected. This special card only exists in the original edition, having been effectively replaced by the 0 card in the 2022 edition, which has the same effect, but has the same color as number cards (orange); the 0 card may thus be treated as a regular number card.
- Reverse: Leaves the total unaffected and switches the direction of play (clockwise to counterclockwise, and vice versa). When there are only two players in the game, this card has no effect on the turn order nor the total value.
- Double Play: Leaves the total unaffected and forces the next player in sequence to take two complete turns. In the 2022 edition, this card is referred to as Play 2.
  - In the original edition, the player affected by Double Play may play a Double Play card, but only on their second turn. Alternatively, that player may play a Reverse card to deflect Double Play to the player who played in on them, or play a Hold card to force the next player in sequence to play twice.
  - In the 2022 edition, the player affected by Play 2 may play a Reverse card to deflect Play 2 to the player who played it on them, or immediately play a Play 2 card to end their turn and force the next player in sequence to play twice. The effects of two or more consecutive Play 2 cards do not stack.
- ONO 99: Immediately raises the total to 99, causing whoever played it to lose the hand. Because of this, this card cannot be played normally and merely takes up space in a player's hand.
  - There are a total of four ONO 99 cards in the original edition, so it is possible for one player to end up holding all of these and thus lose the hand on their next turn. An alternate rule allows this card to be played without penalty if the total ends in zero, in which case it functions identically to the Hold card.
  - The 2022 edition increased the number of ONO 99 cards in the deck to ten and introduced a new rule that allows the player holding four of these to discard their entire hand and draw four new cards.

If a player lays down a card, but fails to draw one before the next player in sequence completes their own turn, they are not allowed to replace the missing card. A player so affected can potentially be at a great disadvantage, especially if they are holding any ONO 99 card. The player may correct the error by drawing a card before the next player in sequence completes a turn.

All players begin the game with an equal number of lives, left up to their discretion. Losing a hand costs the player one life; a player who has run out of lives is out of the game. The last remaining player is the winner.

== Alternate scoring ==
A rule variation as suggested in the official rules is to use a point-scoring system in which the player who loses the hand receives 25 points plus the value of cards in their hand:

- Number cards: face value
- Hold, Reverse, Minus Ten, and Double Play/Play 2 cards: 15 points
- ONO 99 card: 20 points
- Each fewer card in hand (if the loser also has less than four cards): 15 points

A point limit is determined before the start of the game (500 as suggested by the official rules). When a player's score reaches the limit, either the game ends and the player with the lowest score wins, or the player who reached the score limit is eliminated and the game continues until only one player remains.

== See also ==
- Uno (card game)
