= Basalorum =

Former village in Skellefteå Municipality, Sweden

Coordinates: 65.3444°N 20.0172°E

Basalorum is a former village in Jörns socken in the north-west part of Skellefteå Municipality, Västerbotten County, Sweden.

Basalorum was built in the Jörn Parish by the Swedish state. The village was built in 1836 and got its name in the 19th century when a geographical surveyor played with the childish rhyme Snipp, snapp, snorum, hej basalorum. Snipp, Snapp, Snorum and Hej are four other villages in the vicinity.

Basalorum was the first of these villages to be abandoned. According to the church books, the village was abandoned in 1854 when the first settler with family moved to Norway.
