= Jörn =

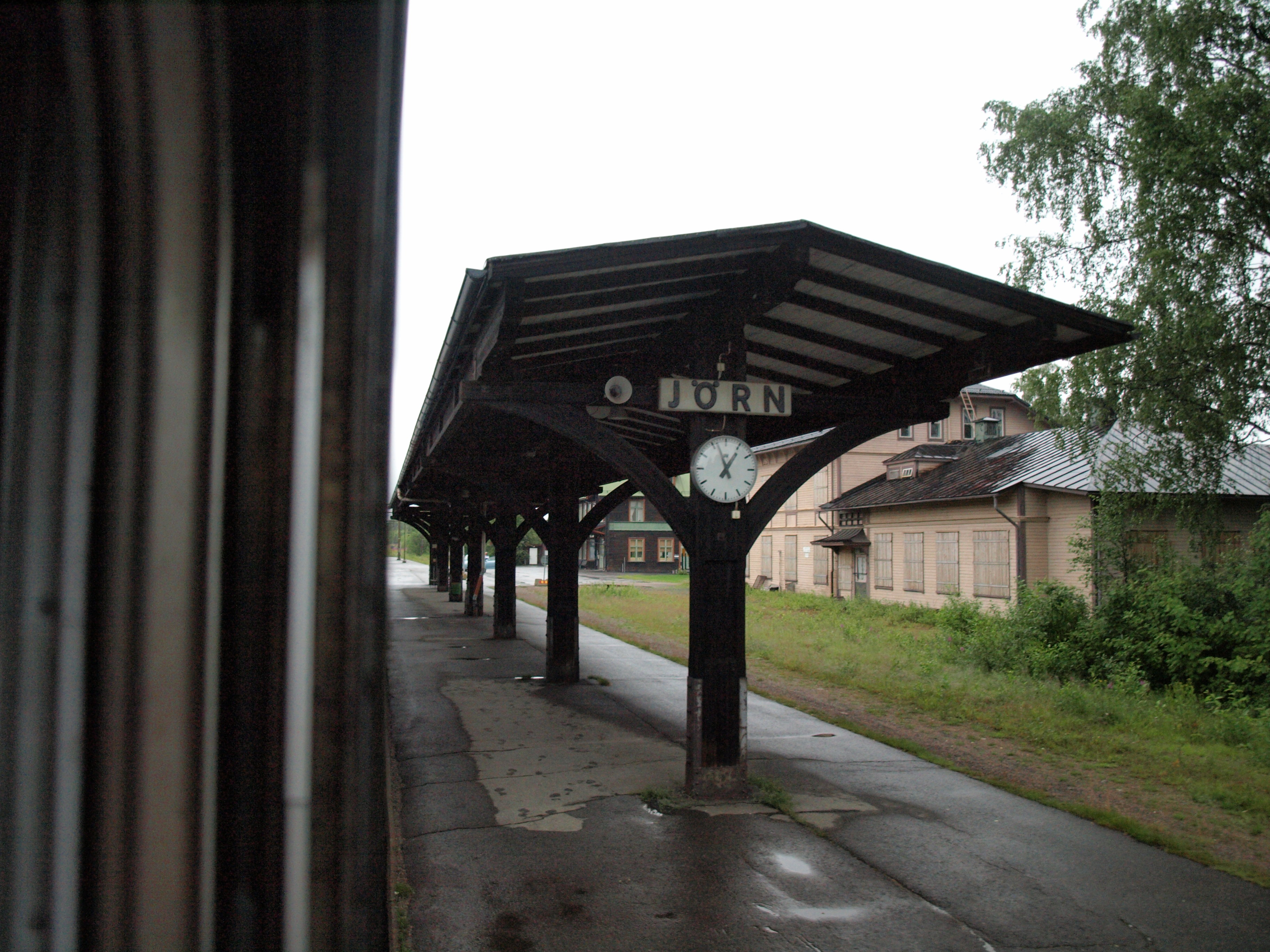
- Jörn railway station

- Location within Västerbotten Location within Sweden
- Coordinates: 65°04′N 20°02′E
- Country: Sweden
- Province: Västerbotten
- County: Västerbotten County
- Municipality: Skellefteå Municipality

Area
  - Total: 2.03 km^{2} (0.78 sq mi)

Population (31 December 2010)
  - Total: 797
  - Density: 393/km^{2} (1,020/sq mi)
- Time zone: UTC+1 (CET)
  - Summer (DST): UTC+2 (CEST)

Jörn is a locality situated in Skellefteå Municipality, Västerbotten County, Sweden with 797 inhabitants in 2010. The locality developed around a train station along the Main line through upper Norrland. Vladimir Lenin made his last stop in Sweden at the station in Jörn during his return from exile in 1917.
