= Slapjack =

Card game

- Players slap the pile when a jack is played
- Type: Matching
- Players: 3-4 (2-8)
- Skills: Visual alertness, reflex action
- Cards: 52
- Deck: French
- Rank (high→low): N/A
- Play: Clockwise
- Playing time: 15 min.
- Chance: Mostly luck

Related games
- Beggar-My-Neighbour, Egyptian Ratscrew
- Easy to play

Slapjack, also known as Slaps, is a card game generally played among children. It can often be a child's first introduction to playing cards. The game is a cross between Beggar-My-Neighbour and Egyptian Ratscrew and is also sometimes known as Heart Attack. It is also related to the simpler 'slap' card games often called Snap.

== Gameplay ==
A 52-card deck is divided into face-down stacks as equally as possible between all players. One player removes the top card of their stack and places it face-up on the playing surface within reach of all players. The players take turns doing this in a clockwise manner until a jack is placed on the pile. At this point, any and all players may attempt to slap the pile with the hand they didn't use to place the card; the first player to cover the stack with their hand takes the pile, shuffles it, and adds it to the bottom of their stack. If another player puts their card over the jack before it is slapped, the jack and the cards underneath can't be taken by a player until the next jack is revealed. When a player has run out of cards, they have one more chance to slap a jack and get back in the game, but if they fail, they are out. Gameplay continues with hands of this sort until one player has acquired all of the cards.

In a popular variation with a regular deck, the person covering the cards must simultaneously say "Slapjack!" If the person fails to say this, they do not get the pile. Additionally, if the player covers the pile and says "Slapjack", and the card is not a jack, then the other players get to divide the pile evenly among themselves.

== Variations ==
=== Snap ===
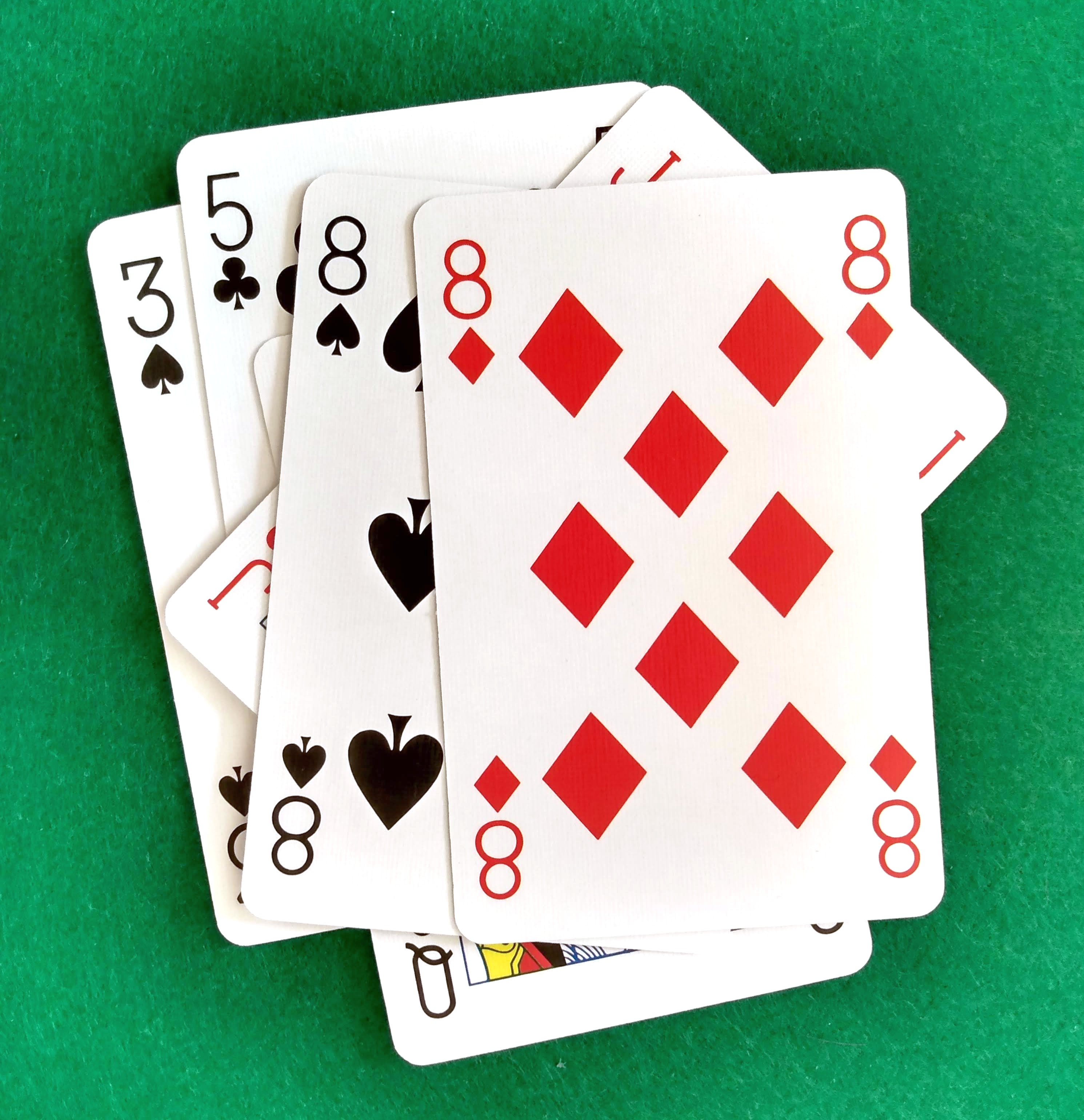
In the game of Snap, two identical numbers dealt in a row is a "snap"

Snap is a popular children's card game where cards are dealt out and the object is to react first when a pair of same-value cards are revealed. Gameplay is related to Egyptian Ratscrew. The game is often one of the first card games to be taught to children and is often played with special packs of cards featuring popular children's characters from television programmes or recent films. For older children, more complex packs exist, where the differences between cards are more subtle and penalties exist for falsely calling Snap.

The pack of cards is dealt out among the players in face-down stacks as equally as possible. Play proceeds with the players taking it in turns to remove a card from the top of their stack and place it face-up on a pile in front of them. If two cards on the tops of any of these piles are ever identical (or, if a conventional pack of cards is used, are of the same number), the first player to shout "Snap!" takes both face-up piles and adds them to the bottom of their own stack. The player who accumulates all the cards wins.

In a variation, better suited to younger children, cards are played onto a single shared stack, and players call "snap!" if two consecutive cards on this pile are identical.

=== Cabin 6 ===
This variation is played with a traditional deck of cards and complications are added as to appeal to a slightly older demographic.

A standard 54 (including jokers) deck of cards is dealt face down to the players. Simultaneously, all players turn over their top card. If any two cards show the same number, OR a joker is played by any player, the first player to cry out (traditionally the word 'snap' but any cry will do) receives all of the cards played. If none is played, players turn over the next card in their deck. When a player runs out of cards, they have until the end of the trick AND the next trick to attempt to win themselves cards. After this they are eliminated. Eliminated players act as judges as to who cries out first. The player with all of the cards at the end wins.

=== Irish Snap ===
Irish Snap is a card game whose objective is to lose cards as quickly as possible. Since there is only one loser, forfeits can be made for the person with all the cards at the end of the game.

A deck of card is dealt out to the players, face down. They take turns to play cards face-up to a centre pile, calling out card ranks as they do so: the first player calls "Ace", the second "two", and so on. If the card you play matches the card you have called, the pile can be slapped as in Slapjack, with the last person to slap taking the pile as a penalty. The last player to have any cards left is the loser.

==== Alternative rules ====
Other commonly accepted rules include:

- If the card laid is identical in rank to the one beneath it, all players snap.
- If the card laid is a queen, all players snap.
- If a seven (or another rank of card agreed upon by all players) is laid, the ranks are no longer counted out loud and players must keep track of them in their head. This may continue until the same card is laid again and nullifies the rule.
- Players snap a set of cards which increase or decrease by one rank every card. For example: 5,6,7 or 8,7,6.
- Players snap "sandwiches", two matching cards with any card in between them, such as 5,7,5 or Jack,3,Jack.
- Players must salute before making a snap which will land on a king
- When a player runs out of cards, they continue to call numbers. However, any potential snaps this causes may be snapped before they have said the relevant card rank. This is particularly interesting when neighboring players run out of cards simultaneously.
- If a player snaps incorrectly when there is not actually any kind of matching pair, they receive all of the cards. However, in order for this to come into effect the player must touch the deck in the middle. If they simply shout snap, or motion towards it, the game carries on as normal.
- Any player who snaps fastest twice in a row may add another rule.
- A player who runs out of cards and snaps fastest is declared the winner.

Irish Snap can also be played as a drinking game, where a player must also take a drink when they take the pile of cards.

== See also ==
- One Card (card game)
- Snip Snap Snorem
- Egyptian Ratscrew
- Jungle Speed
