= Egyptian Ratscrew =

Card game involving "slapping" cards

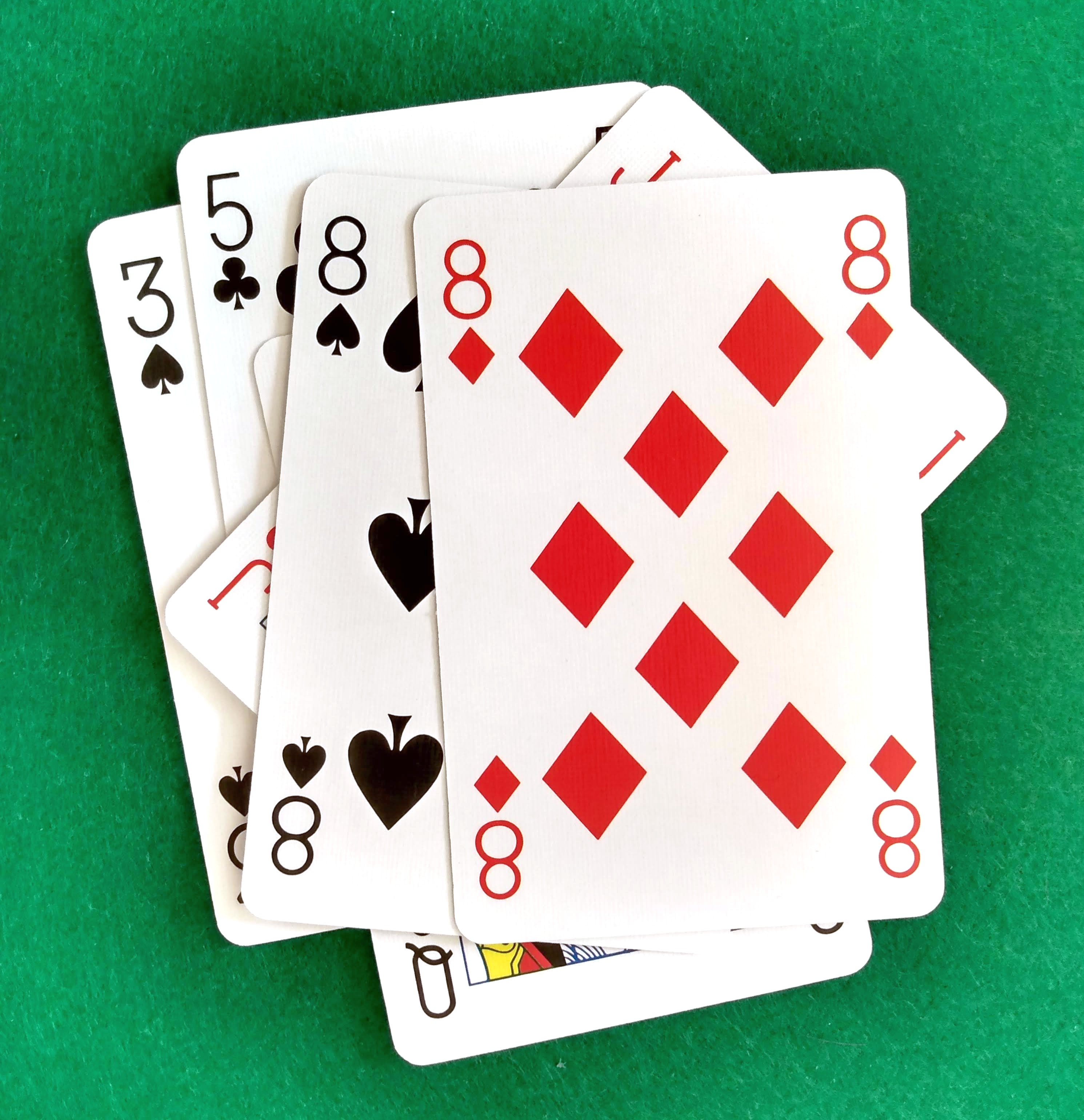
- In Egyptian Ratscrew, certain consecutive card combinations, such as a pair (pictured), allow any player to slap the pile and claim it.
- Origin: United States
- Alternative name: ERS, Egyptian War, Bloodystump, Ratslap, Slap
- Type: Matching
- Players: 2+
- Skills: Speed, counting, pattern recognition
- Cards: 52
- Deck: French
- Rank (high→low): A K Q J (10 9 8 7 6 5 4 3 2)
- Play: Clockwise or counterclockwise
- Playing time: 10+ minutes
- Chance: Moderate

Related games
- Beggar-my-neighbour • Slapjack • Snap

Egyptian Ratscrew (sometimes abbreviated to ERS, and also known as Egyptian War, Bloodystump, Ratslap or Slap) is a modern American card game in the matching family, popular among children. It resembles the 19th-century British card game Beggar-my-neighbour, but includes the additional element of "slapping" certain card combinations when they are played. This slapping concept may have been borrowed from the game Slapjack.

== Rules ==
The game is played with a standard 52-card deck, or with multiple standard decks shuffled together for larger groups. The number of players is limited only by each participant's ability to reach the central pile. Cards are dealt as evenly as possible, and Jokers may be introduced for variations in gameplay or to ensure an even deal.

Players are prohibited from viewing their cards, even when playing from their hand. The player to the dealer's left begins by placing a card face-up from the top of their deck, starting the central discard pile. When playing, cards must be flipped away from the player, revealing the card to all participants at the same time. Penalties may be incurred if a player reveals a card toward themselves first.

Play proceeds around the circle, with each player laying down a card onto the central pile, one at a time. This continues until a face card or Ace is played, designating that player as the "challenger". The next player, the "challenged", is given a set number of chances to play a face card or Ace to continue the challenge: four chances for an Ace, three for a King, two for a Queen, and one for a Jack. In some variations, the order of chances is reversed for Kings and Jacks. The challenged player must play one card at a time, either placing another face card or exhausting their allowed chances. If they succeed, the next player must respond; if not, the challenger who played the original face card wins the pile. The player who wins a pile begins the next round. Piles are added to the winner's deck, face-down and unshuffled. Victory is achieved by the player who collects all the cards in play.

=== Slapping ===
In addition to the basic progression of play, players should agree beforehand on specific card combinations that, when played, entitle whoever slaps the pile first to claim it. The simplest and most common combination is the Double (two cards of equal rank). Other common combinations include:

- Ratscrew, a 6 and a 9
- Double, two cards of the same rank
- Sandwich, a double with one card of a different rank between the two
- Four in a Row, four or more cards in ascending or descending order of rank, e.g., 7, 6, 5, 4; 10, Jack, Queen, King
- Tens, two cards with ranks adding up to 10
- Top Bottom, the first card played is played again later on
- Jokers, any Joker, specific variations may have specific rules
- Marriage, King and Queen on top of each other

For a legitimate slap, the player to react the fastest and slap the top card first claims the pile. The game's alternate name of Bloodystump refers to the potential for injury when several players try to slap the card at the same time: it is recommended that players remove any rings they are wearing, before the game.

=== Player elimination ===
Players who run out of cards are eliminated from the game. If a player attempting to counter a face card exhausts their deck without success, the next player may continue with the remaining chances, or the play ends, and the pile is claimed by the player who played the face card.

Eliminated players, however, can "slap in" on a valid card combination to rejoin the game, as long as there are still at least two active players with cards. If the final active player fails to counter a face card and runs out of cards, the pile goes to the player who laid down the face card. The player holding all the cards must then play three more cards, offering the opponent one last chance to slap back into the game.

=== Penalties ===
If a player slaps the pile without a valid card combination, they must discard one or more cards to the bottom of the pile, and play resumes based on the last card. If caught slapping or taking cards illegally, the play can be contested: if legal, those who contested must give their top card to the slapped player; if illegal, the contested player gives a card to each challenger. This rule introduces an element of bluffing into the game while maintaining a quick pace by discouraging both incorrect slaps and frequent contesting of legal plays.

Players without cards receive a strike for each illegitimate slap, and after three strikes, they lose the ability to slap for the remainder of the game. In another variation, they "burn their hands", placing them at the bottom of the pile and waiting to be slapped. Once the pile is awarded or another player slaps, the offender must remove their hand and may resume slapping in subsequent rounds.

Cards played out of turn are considered "dead cards". These cards can either be placed at the bottom of the pile or left in place, but they do not allow for legitimate slaps. Any slap involving a dead card, even if placed intentionally out of turn, results in a penalty. Penalty cards may be placed at the top of the deck as dead cards, further complicating the game and increasing the risk of illegitimate slaps.

The same penalty system may be applied to other rule infractions, such as playing a card when it is not one's turn or accidentally drawing multiple cards and placing them on the pile.

== Strategies ==
Memorization can help players anticipate slapping opportunities before cards are placed on the pile. For example, in a two-player game, if one player legitimately slaps a double, the other player may realise that later in the game the same double will appear as a sandwich, providing another chance to slap. Some players may also deliberately fake a slap in hopes of tricking their opponent into slapping incorrectly or positioning themselves advantageously in the deck by recalling previous pile collections.

While the ultimate goal is to win the entire deck, it is usually advantageous to have a deck rich in face cards, as they offer better chances to play or counter a face card. Non-face cards, often referred to as "fillers", dilute a player's deck, potentially causing them to lose valuable piles if they cannot counter a face card. Players may therefore refrain from slapping certain combinations if no face cards are in the pile, prioritising strategy over immediate gain.

Additionally, when a face card is played, a player might want to slap the last card dropped after the face card (1st for Jack, 2nd for Queen, 3rd for King, and 4th for Ace), regardless of what it might be. This tactic, known as a "risk slap", is often profitable as the potential reward of winning the pile outweighs the risk of burning a card. Players with a strong lead in cards may use this strategy, sacrificing one card in hopes of gaining the pile. A counter-strategy involves quickly moving a card towards the pile without dropping it, provoking a risk slap from an opponent. If the next card is a face card, the player who "burned" a card may struggle to recover unless they slap the pile or the challenge comes back to them.

In some variations, it is even allowed to slap the final card without penalty. Furthermore, a player might intentionally slap incorrectly to discard a card or two, preparing for a face card they remember from earlier. This is particularly useful when the opponent has played a high-value face card like a Jack, where there is only one chance to counter with another face card.

== See also ==
- Ninety-nine (addition card game)
- Snip Snap Snorem
