= Snip-snap-snorum =

English card game

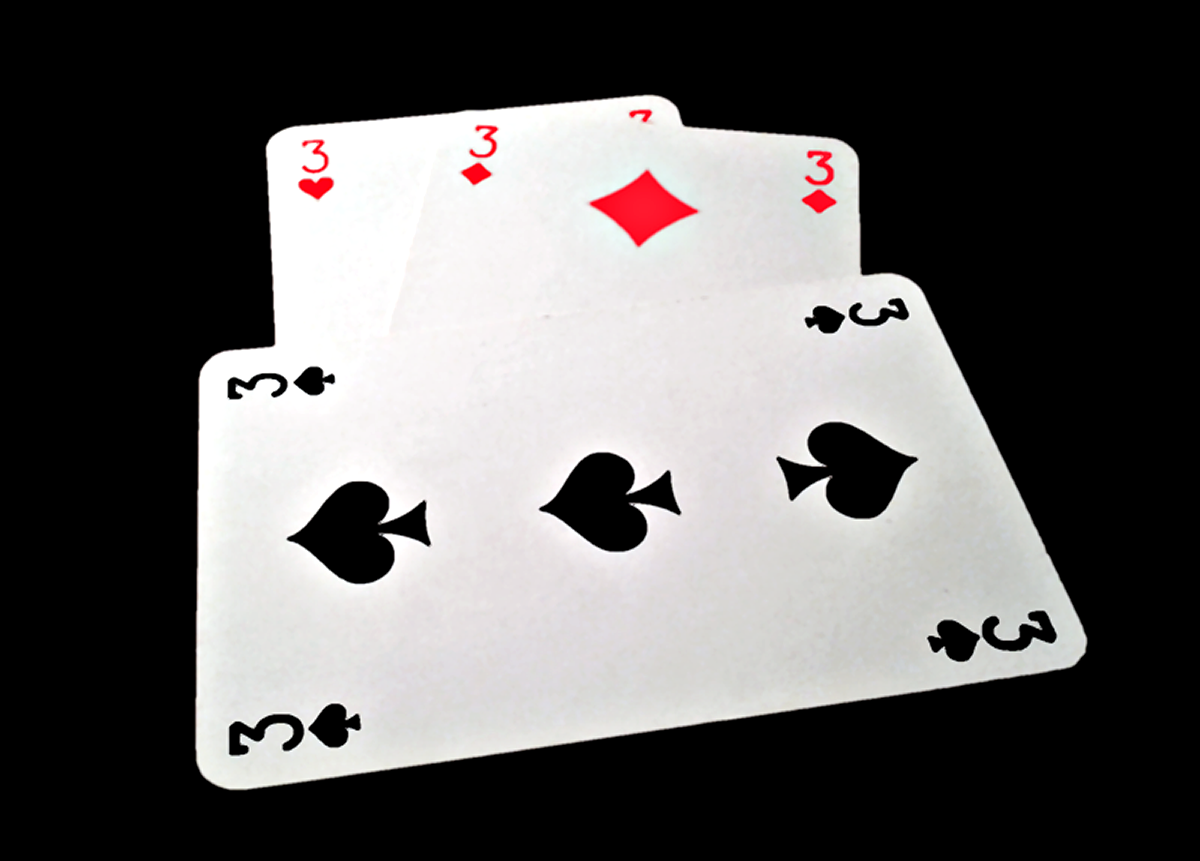
- Origin: Franconia
- Type: Matching
- Players: 2+
- Cards: 52
- Deck: French
- Rank (high→low): A K Q J 10 9 8 7 6 5 4 3 2
- Play: Clockwise
- Playing time: 5 min.
- Chance: Low

Related games
- Slapjack

Snip-snap-snorum, or snip-snap-snorem (sometimes unhyphenated), is a matching-type card game, mostly played by children, and has several variants. The game dates to at least the 17th century in Franconia, and probably derives from a more ancient drinking and gambling game. References to "snip, snap, snorum", which seems to be the original English spelling, go back to at least 1755.

== History ==
The game is mentioned in a Franconian publication as early as 1650 under the name 'Schnip, Schnap, Schnurr und Schnepepperling. A 1755 edition of The Connoisseur newspaper mentions snip-snap-snorum being played in Wiltshire, the author recounting a visit where a group of "country girls and cherry-cheeked bumkins" played the game around a large table as part of a Christmas tradition, along with the card game Pope Joan. The game is mentioned in Christopher Smart's 1767 translation of the works of Horace, where he adds a footnote to his translated text "After this fare we had a play, To take our glass in turn, or pay", noting that he regards this as "a game like snip, snap, snorum." The game is mentioned by the English novelist Frances Burney in 1782.

The game appears, as Chnif Chnof Chnorum, in 1782 and 1790 in France. Vilmar describes it as a children's game popular in the early 19th century in Germany, the original and proper name of which was Schnipp, Schnapp, Schnorum, Apostelorum although the last word, which means "of the apostles" became corrupted to the meaningless word, "Basalorum". Five villages in 19th-century Sweden were named after the Swedish equivalent, Snipp, snapp, snorum, hej basalorum: Snipp, Snapp, Snorum, Hej and Basalorum.

== The game ==
There are several methods of playing the game, but in the most common a full whist pack is used and any number of players may take part. The pack is dealt, one card at a time, and the eldest hand places upon the table any card of his choosing. Each player in their turn then tries to match the card played just before theirs; playing it while saying one of the prescribed words: "Snip!", "Snap!" or "Snorem!" in sequence. Thus, if a king is played, the next player lays down another king (if one is in-hand) calling out "Snip!". The next player may lay down the third king if available, saying "Snap!", and the next the fourth king with the word "Snorem!". A player not being able to pair the card played may not discard, and the holder of snorem has the privilege of beginning the next round. The player who gets rid of all cards in-hand first wins a counter from the other players for each card still held by them.

== Variations ==
=== Earl of Coventry ===
The game is recorded as early as 1821 being played in Suffolk, England, as Mayor of Coventry. Normally called Earl of Coventry, it is just the same as Snip-Snap-Snorum, but played without counters for a simple win. The leader says "There's as good a 6 can be" (if they had played a six). The second player says "There's a 6 as good as he", the third "There's the best of all the three", and the fourth "And there's the Earl of Coventry". Optionally, players may be required to make a different rhyming statement every time they play a fourth card.

=== Jig ===
A related game called jig is somewhat a cross between snip-snap and stops, in that the aim of succeeding players is not to match rank but to play the next higher card of the same suit, from ace low to king high.

The leader plays any card and says "Snip", and the next four able to continue the sequence announce respectively "Snap", "Snorum", "Hicockalorum", "Jig". The last turns down the five-card sequence and starts a new one. When a sequence cannot be continued because the last card was a king or the next card has been played out, the last player says "Jig" regardless of position, and leads to the next round. As before, the first out of cards receives 1 counter for each card left in other players' hands.

=== Niddy-noddy ===
Moor describes an old Suffolk variant allows that any number to play. The cards are all dealt out and elder plays one, saying or singing "there's a good card for thee," passing it to the right. The next person with a card of the same rank says "there's a still better than he," and passes both onward. The person with the third says "there's the best of all three" and the holder of the fourth crowns it all with "And there is Niddy-Noddeee!", winning the tack (trick) and starting again. Moor acknowledges an alternative final line of "and there's the Lord Mayor of Coventreee!"

=== Schnipp-Schnapp-Schnurr-Burr-Basilorum ===
An extended version called Schnipp Schnapp Schnurr Burr Basilorum is played in Germany. Kings are not stops but are followed by ace, two, etc. The rules are recorded as early as 1868 in the Electorate of Hesse under their original name of Schnipp Schnapp Schnurr Apostolorum, the last word "also being abbreviated to Bostelorum or Bastelorum" and, later, Baselorum. In the variant described by Vilmar, players must lead either with a seven or a jack. He goes on to explains that the original meaning was to imply a game being played between the Four Apostles or evangelists, but that its corruption to Baselorum by another author diminished its potential irreverence.

=== Snipp, Snapp, Snurre, Basserulle, Korintibus ===
Another version emerged in Denmark and Norway between 1850 and 1930, called Korente Margrete in Denmark. The objective is to shed all cards first. The leader plays any card while exclaiming "Snip", and any player with the following card continues the sequence announcing respectively "Snap", "Snurre", "Burre" and "Korente Margrete". The danish word korente means currants (from ‘grapes of Corinth’) and it is assumed that currants were used instead of coins while playing in family settings. The exact origin of the other words is unknown, but are linked to Scandinavian children rhymes and fairytale endings such as Snipp, Snapp, Snute. The precise game rules are also not described in any literature, but survive through oral tradition in families who still play the game.

A modern, competitive card shedding game with custom cards was developed by the Norwegian game company Snippsnapper AS in 2025, based on the Scandinavian version. In this version the words are considered a magic spell, formed by the words "Snipp", "Snapp", "Snurre", "Basserulle" and "Korintibus", and it includes a fable world of cartoon like characters that trigger point accumulation and penalties. The custom cards all have duplicates, introducing a competitive dimension and players must play as quick as possible to follow the sequence of numbers within the same colour. The leader plays any card while exclaiming "Snipp", and the first player with the corresponding following card in the same colour quickly continues the sequence before anyone else can, exclaiming the correct word of the spell. The play is random, accelerated and haphazard, based on which players hold the correct cards, creating scenes of rivalry, frustration, surprises and general amusement.

=== Tommy come tickle me ===
American author Eliza Leslie in 1831 records a game for girls called Tommy come tickle me which is like Earl of Coventry above. A full pack of 52 cards is used. Players cut for first deal, highest wins. Aces are high. The dealer distributes the whole pack and the player to the left leads saying "Here's a very good king for me" as she plays any card, in this case a king. The next player with a king plays it saying "Here's another, as good as he". The next player with a king does likewise saying "Here's the best of all the three" and the player with the fourth king says "And here's Tommy come tickle me." If a player is unable to play a card of the required rank, she says "It passes me." A player with two or three cards of the same sort that is wanted may play them in succession. The player who plays the fourth card, "Tommy come tickle me," takes up the trick and lays it beside her. She is then next to lead. The first one out wins.

== See also ==
- One-card
- Slapjack
- Egyptian ratscrew
- Snipp, Snapp, Snorum, Hej and Basalorum – five villages in Skellefteå Municipality, Västerbotten County, Sweden, named after called-out terms in the German variant of the game

== Bibliography ==
- _ (1782). Encyclopédie Méthodique: ou Par Ordre de Matières: Par une Société de Gens del Lettres, de Savans et d'Artistes. Paris: Agasse.
- Colman, George and Bonnell Thornton (1755). THE Connoisseur. London: R. Baldwin, at the Rose in Pater-noster Row
- Hall, Joseph and 'Schnebelin' (1650). Erklärung der wunder-seltzamen Land-Charten Utopiae. Nuremberg.
- Huvier des Fontenelles, Pierre M. (1790) Les Soirées Amusantes ou Entretien sur les Jeux à Gages ou d'Autres. 2nd edn. Paris: Veuve Duchesne et fils.
- Leslie, Eliza (1831). The American Girl's Book. Boston: Munroe & Francis; NY: C.S. Francis.
- Fahlgren, Karl (1953). Skellefte Sockens Historia. Tryckt på Almqvist & Wiksells boktryckeri AB
- Moor, Edward (1823). Suffolk Words and Phrases. London: Loder.
- Parlett, David (1996). Oxford Dictionary of Card Games. Oxford: Oxford University Press. ISBN 0-19-869173-4
- Parlett, David (2008). The Penguin Book of Card Games. London: Penguin ISBN 978-0-141-03787-5
- Sheinwold, Alfred; Sheila Anne Barry and Margie Golick-Sterling (2003). The Little Giant Book of Card Games. ISBN 1-4027-0286-8
- Smart, Christopher (1767). The Works of Horace. London: Flexney, Johnson and Caslon
- Vilmar, Dr. August Friedrich Christian (1868). Idiotikon von Kurhessen. Marburg & Leipzig: R.G. Elwertsche Universitäts-Buchhandlung
