= Roland Gööck =

German editor and author (1923 – 1991)

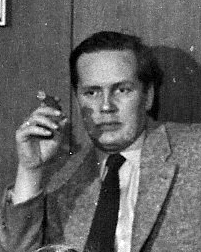
- Gööck in 1958
- Born: 1923
- Died: 1991 (aged 67–68)
- Occupations: Editor and non-fiction author

Roland Gööck (1923–1991) was a German editor and non-fiction author who, from 1954, was in charge of the publisher Bertelsmann.

== Life and career ==
Roland Gööck was born on 29 September 1923 in Felchta in Thuringia as the son of a priest. His ancestors bore the surname Jöök and came from the Baltic states.

Gööck's first book, the utopian crime thriller, Corix ist dagegen, appeared in 1948 under the pseudonym of Peter Roland.

From 1954 to 1962 Gööck was Bertelsmann's chief press officer. In the late 1950s, he published new editions of the works of Jules Verne (Sigbert Mohn, Vier-Falken) and Robinson Crusoe (Sigbert Mohn, Bertelsmann Lesering) and, in 1958, worked for Bertelsmann on a biography of Zarah Leander after the series of the same name in the Bild newspaper by Max Pierre Schaeffer. In the early 1960s, followed editions by Karl-May-Büchern for Bertelsmann, Mosaik (Hamburg), Scherz (Berne) and Phoenix (Berne/Munich), Heidi (Bertelsmann Lesering, Phoenix), late 1960s Onkel Toms Hütte (Bertelsmann, Scherz) and Wilhelm Busch’s Hausapotheke (Praesentverlag Peter).

1962 saw the start of Gööck's non-fiction career. He proposed to Bertelsmann, to produce a large cookery book for Bertelsmann Lesering; in the first quarter of 1963 the book broke all edition records. After that, Gööck wrote more than 230 non-fiction books and illustrated books during the 1960s, 1970s and 1980s (games manuals and cookery books) under his own name but also under various pseudonyms, that were chosen for specific subject areas:

Roland M. Gööck (football etc.), Lutz Adron (general knowledge), Pim Pinelli (Gewürze der Welt), Peter Roland, Alexander Ettl (recipe books for fish, cheese and spices), Alex Ettl (architecture, cookery books), Roland Gek (only for books in Serbia), Roland Gēks (Große Erfindungen …), Rolf Jeromin (worldly themes: wine guide, culinary cuisine worldwide, travel reports), Peter Korn (Karl-May-Büchern), Franz Mausener (humour) und Peggy Persson (Wilhelm Busch’s Hausapotheke).

At Bertelsmann, Gööck was called Sachbuch-Goethe ("Non-fiction Goethe"), others described him as a Vielschreiber ("writing maniac") and Sachbuch-Alleskönner ("Non-fiction Knowall") or as a Tausendsassa ("Jack of all trades") and Auflagenmillionär ("printing millionaire"). In 1983, his 230 books had a combined total print run of 41.5 million, including the German non-fiction leader, Das neue große Kochbuch (3 million), Alle Wunder dieser Welt (2 million) and Der Mensch in seiner Welt (12 volumes, 12 million).

In addition to the versatility of the topics he worked on, speed of publication was also Gööck's specialty. For the first time at the 1960 Summer Olympics in Rome, Gööck and his team made sure that the first illustrated books reached the bookstores just four days after the closing ceremony. Further 'Gööck rush jobs' (Gööck’sche Schnellschüsse) (industry jargon) came out including picture books within only three days after the football and athletics world championships and the Olympic Games.

After the first book I started to enjoy it. Today I write books because every book plan is a new great adventure for me, because I learn a lot from everyone and because I think it is an important and good thing to simply express simple things.

— Roland Gööck (1983)

Gööck died on 2 October 1991 in Regensburg.

== Publications ==
For most publications (as of 1983: 230 books, non-fiction and illustrated books) it is impossible to work out to what extent Gööck was the author, initiator, coordinator and/or editor. According to WorldCat there are currently (2011) 613 works in 951 publications and 21 languages, including German, English, Finnish, French, Italian, Croatian, Latvian, Dutch, Norwegian, Polish; Portuguese, Swedish, Serbian, Slovak, Slovenian, Spanish and Hungarian.

=== Early titles ===
- Peter Roland (Roland Gööck): Corix ist dagegen (Utopian crime thriller), Iris-booksei, Engelbert-, Iserlohn/Regensburg, 1948
- Roland Gööck: Als die Sperrmauer brach – Ein Bericht über die Zerstörung der Edertalsperre am 17. Mai 1943 und den Wiederaufbau im Edertal; Wilhelm Bing, Korbach, 1953

=== Non-fiction books (selection) ===
- Bertelsmann
  - Roland Gööck: Bertelsmann (Ausführlicher Überblick über den Konzern), Sigbert Mohn, Gütersloh, 1959.
  - Roland Gööck: books für Millionen. Fritz Wixforth und die Geschichte des Hauses Bertelsmann, Gütersloh, Bertelsmann Sachbuchverlag, 1968.
- Kochbücher und Gewürze (at least 53 books), including:
  - Roland Gööck: Das neue große Kochbuch, Bertelsmann-Ratgeberverlag, Munich, Gütersloh, Wien, 1963 (1st edn.).
  - Roland Gööck: Roland Gööcks neue große Kochschule, Mosaik-, Munich, 1986.
  - Roland Gööck: Das Buch der Gewürze, Mosaik-, Munich, 1965 (1st edn.)
  - Roland Gööck: Backen mit Lust und Liebe, 800 Rezepte, Bertelsmann, Gütersloh, 1970.
  - Roland Gööck: Die 100 berühmtesten Rezepte der Welt – das Farbbild-Kochbuch der internationalen Spezialitäten, 1971; Sigloch-Edition, Künzelsau, 1983.
- Allgemeinwissen und Quizfragen (at least 41 books), including:
  - Roland Gööck: Quiz – Quiz – Quiz. 2222-mal in die Kiste gegriffen, in der Ihr Wissen schlummert, C. Bertelsmann, Gütersloh, 1st edn. 1959.
  - Roland Gööck: Erfindungen der Menschheit (insgesamt 12 Bände: Wind, Wasser, Sonne, Kohle, Öl; Gesundheit, Nahrung, Wohnen, Bauen; Textil, Bauen und Wohnen, Beleuchtung; Schall, Bild, Optik; Nachrichtentechnik Elektrotechnik; Schrift – Druck – Musik), Sigloch Edition, Künzelsau, 1984.
  - Markus Plessner, Roland Gööck: Der Mensch in seiner Welt, 12 Bände, Bertelsmann (Reinhard Mohn OHG, Praesent- Heinz Peter) 1980.
- Reise-Bildbände und Atlanten (at least 19 books), including:
  - Roland Gööck: Das große Deutschland-Reisebuch, Praesent Peter, Hamburg, 1966.
  - Roland Gööck: Die großen Traumreisen – die schönsten Reiseziele der Welt von Rom bis Rio, Europäische Bildungsgemeinschaft, Stuttgart, 1973 (1st edn.).
  - Roland Gööck: Neuer großer Weltatlas, Reise- und Verkehrsverlag, Berlin / Gütersloh / Stuttgart, 1975.
- Heimwerken und Einrichten (at least 9 books), including:
  - Roland Gööck: Das große Heimwerkerbuch für Haus, Wohnung und Garten, Mosaik-, Munich, 1981st
- Ratgeber „Wein und Spirituosen“ (at least 9 books), including:
  - Roland Gööck: Das 1 × 1 des guten Weins Mosaik-, 1978.
- Geheimnisse und Mystery (at least 8 books), including:
  - Roland Gööck: Die großen Rätsel unserer Welt an den Grenzen des menschlichen Wissens, Bertelsmann, Gütersloh, 1969
- Party und Hobby (at least 6 books), including:
  - Roland Gööck: Das 1 × 1 der Zauberei, 1966.
  - Roland Gööck: Das Party-Buch, Bertelsmann, Gütersloh, 1976.
  - Roland Gööck: Das große praktische Handarbeitsbuch Mosaik, Munich, 1977.
- Gesellschaftsspiele (at least 5 books), including:
  - Roland Gööck: Das große Buch der Spiele – 1000 Spiele für jung und alt, C. Bertelsmann, Gütersloh, 1st edn. 1964.
- Weltmeisterschaften und Olympische Spiele (at least 4 books), including:
  - Roland Gööck: VIII. Fußball-Weltmeisterschaft England 1966, Bertelsmann, Gütersloh, 1966.
  - Roland Gööck: Die Olympischen Spiele, Mexico City, Grenoble, 1968, Bertelsmann, Gütersloh, 1969.
- Health and humour (at least 3 books), including:
  - Roland Gööck: Gipsverband & Ohrensausen – Kniffe, Tricks und Tips für Gesundheit und Wohlbefinden, Heyne, Munich, 1982.

== Literature ==
- Bertelsmann Illustrierte (1965): Wir sprachen mit: Auflagenmillionär Roland Gööck
- Bertelsmann Club Courir (1983): Roland Gööck feiert seinen 60.
- BuchMarkt Nr. 3 (1981), p. 89: Wie arbeitet Roland Gööck, der Autor von mittlerweile 150 (!) booksn?
