= Lokis =

Lokis may refer to:

- Lokis (novella), an 1869 Prosper Mérimée horror novella
- Lokis (film), a 1970 Polish film directed by Janusz Majewski

== See also ==
- Lokys (disambiguation)
- Loki (disambiguation)
