= Brandeln =

Historic card game for four players

- "A delightful German Nap equivalent"
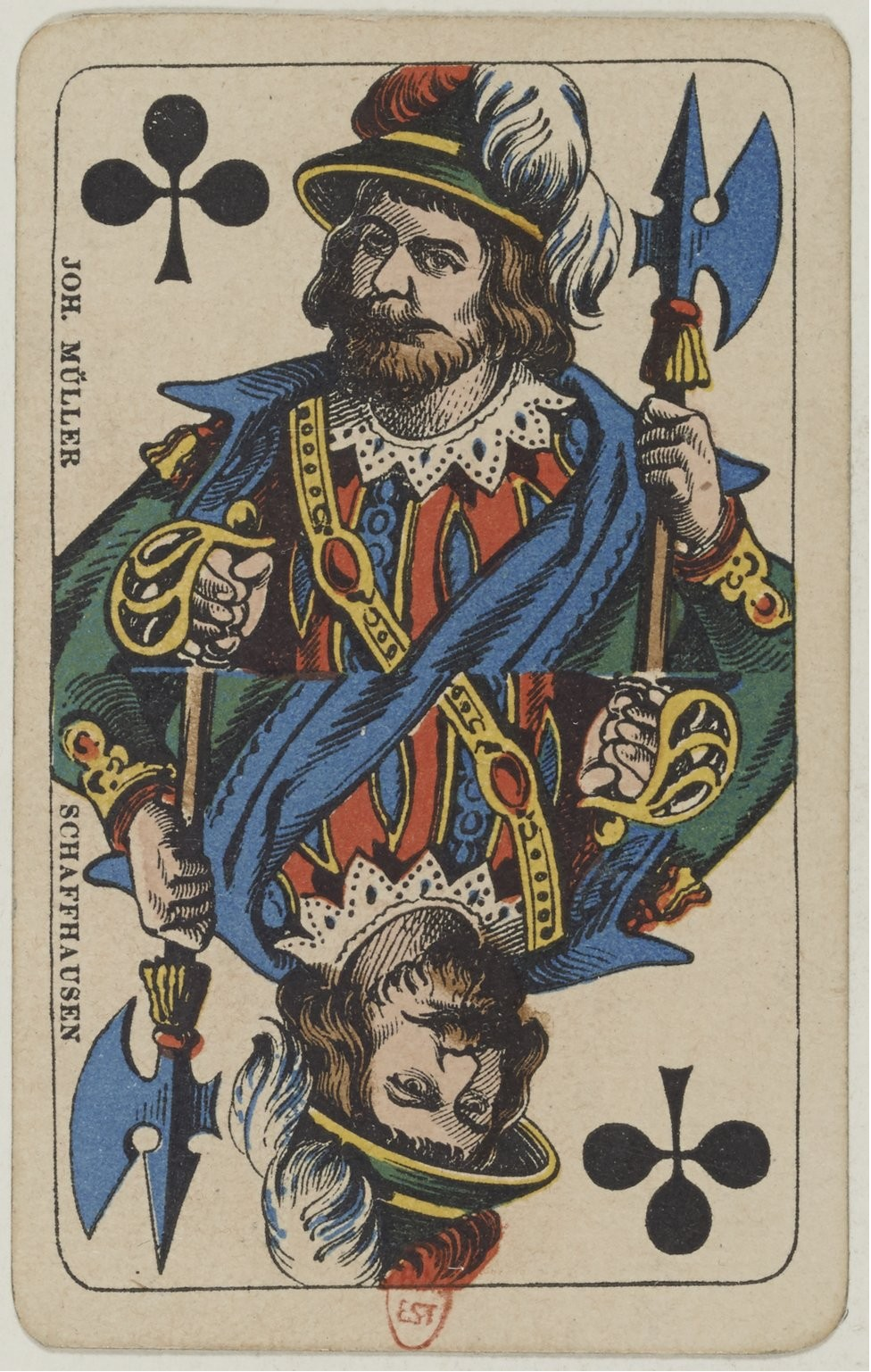
- The top card when Clubs are trumps
- Origin: Germany
- Alternative names: Brandle
- Family: Trick-taking
- Players: 4
- Cards: 28
- Deck: French or German
- Play: Clockwise
- Chance: Easy

Related games
- Nap

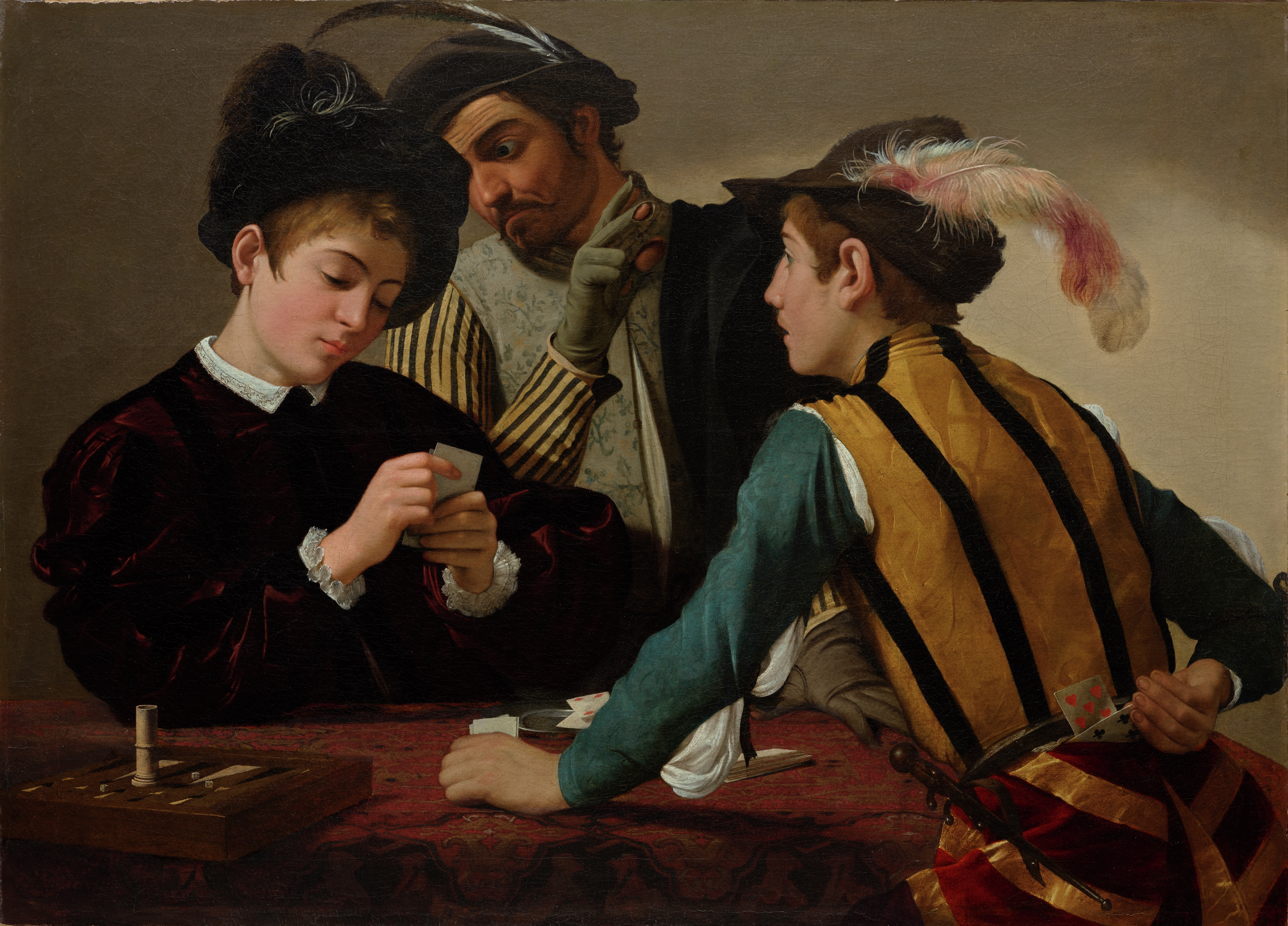
Michelangelo Merisi da Caravaggio: The Card Cheat (painted c. 1594)

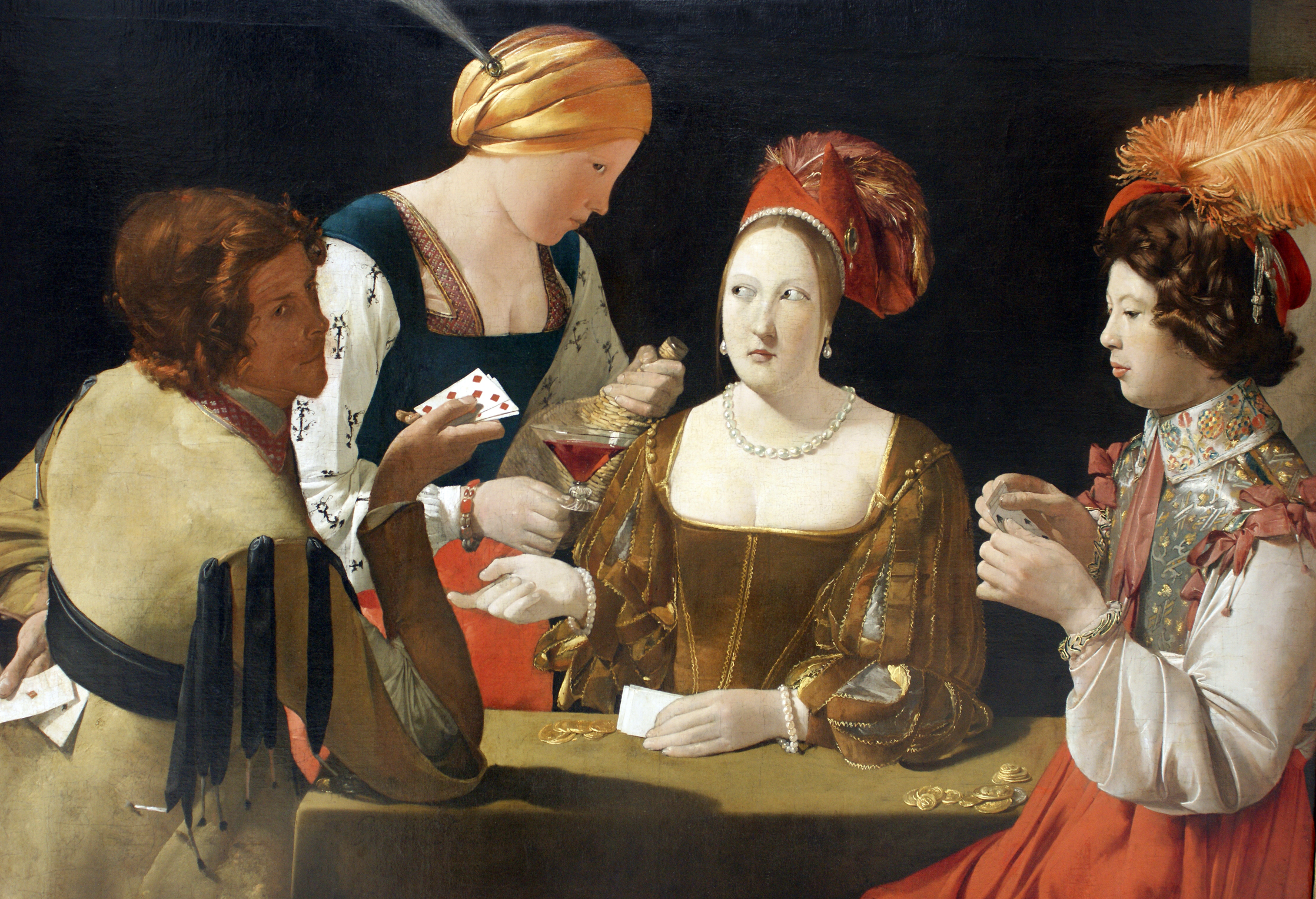
Georges de La Tour: The Card Cheat with the Ace of Diamonds

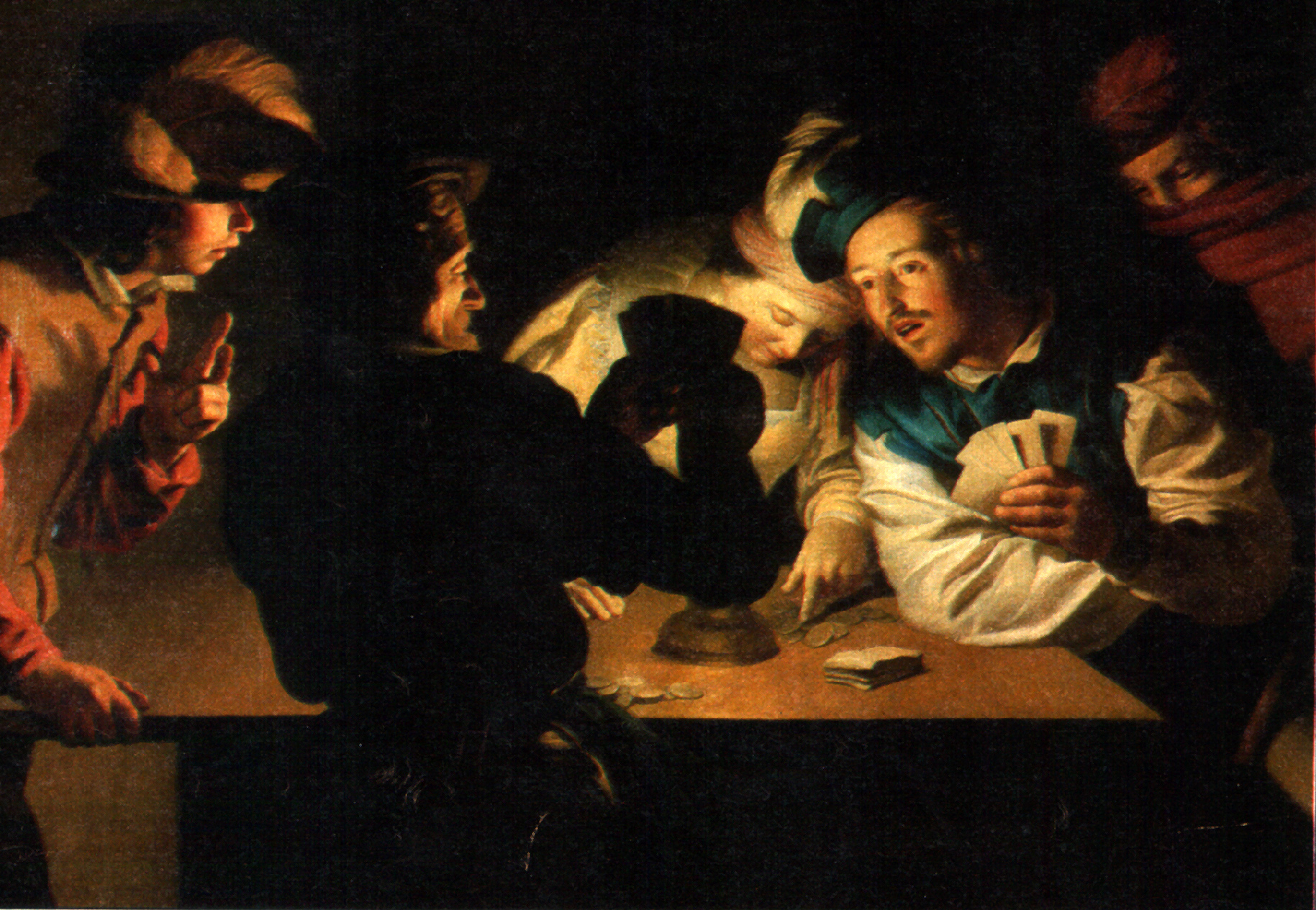
Gerrit van Honthorst: The Card Cheat

Brandeln is an historical card game for three or four players; in which the winning bidder plays alone against the rest. It is one of the earliest games to use the terms Bettel – a contract to lose every trick – and Mord - a contract to win every trick. One of several card games mastered by Mozart, Brandeln is still current in Austria and Germany today. It has been described as having a "civilized, refined and ingenious character" and "one of the most pleasant card games".

Parlett Anglicized the name to Brandle and agrees that it is "a delightful German Nap equivalent".

== Name ==
Brandeln simply means "playing [the game of] Brandel". Historically the game was also referred to as Brandl, Brändeln, Stichbrändeln, Stichbrandl, Brandelspiel, Brannten, Bränteln or even Betteln. According to Schmid, Brandeln was "a certain card game" and bräntelen or bräselen meant to smell of fire or to be suspicious. Schmeller confirms that brändeln means to smell of fire, but adds that it also means to make money or to "play a type of card game" and gives the alternative name of stichbrändeln. (Note: Stich, being the word for "trick", suggests there may have been another form of Brandeln.) Brand is, of course, German for "fire".

== History ==
Rulemann tells us that Brandeln was played by troops during the Thirty Years' War (1618–48) and by soldiers under Frederick the Great during the Seven Years' War (1756–63). In 1722, Johann Nikolaus Weislinger makes an apparent reference to it in his work Friß Vogel oder stirb!, published in Strasbourg.

It was certainly widespread enough to be banned as a gambling game in 1765 and 1851 (as Brannten) in the Austro-Hungarian Empire. In 1770, Bränteln was brought to Vienna by the Bavarians or Swabians and, by 1772, had become the most popular game in the taverns there. However, in the land "above the Enz, in Bavaria and Swabia, it had been around for a long time."

It is recorded in a 1795 Swabian dictionary and its popularity is also suggested by an 1805 musical play, where it is the chief pastime of the princess, Antiope, who likens the game to love, but in another contemporary account it is scorned as a "game for tailors". Other sources confirm that it was played by farmers, peasants and coachmen.

Schmeller's 1827 Bavarian Dictionary tells us that Brändeln or Stichbrändeln is a "type of card game in which you announce the number of tricks you want to take". However, Stichbrändeln may refer to a variant in which there were only three active players; the dealer, the "King", sat out, but could take on the others if they all passed.

Johann Siegmund Popowitsch published the earliest known description of Bränteln in 1772, at which time it was a three-hand game. However, the first complete ruleset is recorded in the 1829 Neuestes Allgemeines Spielbuch which states that its origin is uncertain, but that it is a thoroughly German game whose features were adopted by some of the "newer French and English games" and even by Ombre. Despite this claim of German origin, all the earliest references to it are Austrian. The game is the earliest record of the contracts known as Brand, Mord and Bettel, which found their way into the three-hand games of Bolachen and Wallachen, which may be derivatives. The terms Mord and/or Bettel also appear in other Bavarian card games, such as Grasobern, Herzla and Schafkopf. At least one source refers to Préférence being played with Bettel and Mord.

In 1847, in an Austrian dialect dictionary for the Lower Enns, Brandln is described as a card game with four contracts: Bråndl (3 tricks), Brånd (4 tricks), Moardbrånd (all tricks) and Bedldutti (no tricks).

In 1849, we hear that, at the ball, the ladies of Linz will "play Tarock or Brandel and drink punch," but by 1908 it was "very rarely played." Nevertheless it must have been still popular in Bohemia because from 1895 to around 1920 German-suited, Bohemian Brandl cards (Böhmische Brandl Deutsche Karten Nr. 61) were produced, the known manufacturers being Piatnik and Glanz. These double-headed cards came in 36-card packs, presumably to give them a more universal appeal.

Brandeln has been regularly published in German and Austrian games compendia from 1829 until the present. The game is still found in parts of Austria, for example, in Koglhof.

== Rules ==
=== Bränteln (1772) ===
In the earliest description, written by Popowitsch in 1772, we learn that the game was brought to Vienna either by Bavarians or Swabians two years earlier, but had been established in Bavaria, Swabia and the "land above the Enz" for a long time.

The game was played with French- or German-suited cards. Three players were dealt 7 cards each and the rest were set aside. Players bid to become the declarer and play their chosen contract. The lowest bid was a Brant which required the declarer to take 3 tricks. Players could bid a higher number, but were then committed to taking the additional tricks. In a Mord, which paid double, the declarer had to take all tricks. The highest contract was a Bettel in which the declarer had to lose every trick (Note: This may explain the alternative name for the game: Betteln.)

If four played, the dealer or "King" sat out, but if everyone else passed could announce a Stockbrant, picking up the stock, selecting 7 cards and playing for five tricks. Favori (Hearts) was a preference suit and a player could outbid a contract at the same level if intending to play in that suit.

Popowitsch lists the suits in the order: Hearts, Leaves, Acorns, Bells; however, it is not clear if, apart from Hearts, the suits had an order of preference. He gives the card ranking as: Ober, Seven, Sow [Ace], King, Unter and Nine. (Note: Presumably this is the trump ranking for the three-hand game, thus the 6s, 8s and 10s were omitted from a standard 36-card pack, leaving 24 cards. However, to play Stockbrant there must have been at least 32 cards – i.e. only the 6s were omitted – to give the dealer a choice of cards.)

=== Brandeln (19th to 21st centuries) ===
==== Cards ====
The game is played with 28 cards from a 32-card deck of French-suited playing cards with the 8s removed. The earliest rules mention that either French or German-suited cards may be used.

==== Ranking ====
In the trump suit the Jack and the Seven are the highest trumps; the ranking runs thus: Jack > Seven > Ace > King > Queen > Ten > Nine

In the other suits the ranking of card values for taking tricks is in their natural order: Ace > King > Queen > Jack > Ten > Nine > Seven

==== Preparation ====
Cards may be drawn to determine seating (Note: The usual process was to lay a card of a different suit at each place on the table and let players draw from four other face down cards each of a different suit. Players then sat at the place with the card of the same suit as the one they drew.) and then again to determine first dealer; the player drawing the lowest card dealing first. Dealing, bidding and playing are all in clockwise order. Each player is dealt seven cards in packets of two, three and two again.

==== Bidding ====
The early rules are imprecise about whether the bidding is with immediate or delayed hold. They also seem to imply that only forehand can hold, whereas later rules make clear that any earlier player may hold a higher bid by a later player. However, in general the following apply:

- The player to the left of the dealer is forehand and the first to bid. The options are:

If forehand reckons on winning three tricks in one of the four suits, which then become trumps, he or she says "Brand!" (Brand), "Brandle!" ("Ein Brandel") or "I'll brandle!" ("Ich brandle").
If forehand passes, bidding passes to the second, third and fourth players.

- A Brand (also Brandl or Brandel) can be outbid by 4, 5, 6 tricks announced e.g. as "Four!" or "Four Tricks!"
- Bettel ("Beg") is a bid not to take any tricks. It beats a bid of Six Tricks.
- Mord ("Murder") is a bid to take all 7 tricks. If played at no trump, it is a Herrenmord ("Lord's murder"). (Note: Parlett says that a Herrenmord is not an actual bid, simply a Mord at no trump.)
- By implication jump bidding is allowed.
- The trump suit is only announced once the declarer has won the auction. There are no trumps in a Bettel or a Herrenmord.

==== Playing ====
The player who has announced the highest bid wins the auction and leads to the first trick.

The sources give three different rules of play:

- The earliest sources state that players must follow suit or, if unable, trump and overtrump i.e. they must always head the trick if possible. (Note: e.g. NAS (1829), NST (1830) and VGB (1830). Parlett (2008) changes tack and follows this stricter rule set in his later book.)
- By the 1850s, the rules of play had eased. Players must follow suit and head the trick in the same suit if able; but if unable to follow suit, they may now play any card and there is no requirement to head the trick. This is the most prevalent rule. (Note: e.g. Alvensleben (1853), Anton (1879), Grupp (1974), Parlett (1991) and Kastner and Folkvord (2008).)
- Some modern sources follow Whist rules i.e. that players must follow suit if able; otherwise may play any card. (Note: e.g. Pieper and Schmidt and the Altenburg Spielregelbüchlein.)

Anton says the requirement to head the trick means that the game loses its refinement. In a Bettel contract, in which there are no trumps, players must play a higher card if they can.

==== Scoring ====
There have been two common scoring schemes. In the original one, points or stakes for winning started at 3 for a Brandle and there was no Herrenmord option. In 1830, Tendler added a Herrenmord which scored 18–24 points, with a Mord scoring 12, by pre-agreement. Otherwise he retained the original scoring. From at least 1882, a revised scoring scheme appeared alongside the old one; the new scheme starting with just 1 point for a Brandle. The old scheme is not recorded after 1909.

Scoring in Brandeln
Bid	Aim	Trumps	Early Scheme (1829–1909)	Tendler (1830)	Later Scheme (1882-present)
Brandle	Take three tricks	Yes	3	3	1
Four Tricks	Take four tricks	Yes	4	4	2
Five Tricks	Take five tricks	Yes	5	5	3
Six Tricks	Take six tricks	Yes	6	6	4
Bettel	Take no tricks	No	7	7	5
Mord	Take all tricks	Yes	8	12	6
Herrenmord	Take all tricks	No	–	18 or 24	7

If the game is won, the declarer is paid its game value by each defender; if it is lost, the declarer pays each defender the same amount. Over- and under-tricking does not count. Examples:

- Michael wins the auction with a bid of "Four tricks" and the earlier scoring scheme is being used with hard score (money). If he loses, he pays 4 pfennigs to each defender, paying out a total of 12 pfennigs.
- Sophie wins the auction with a bid of "Mord" and the later scoring scheme is used with soft score (points). If she wins, she scores +18 and each defender scores -6.

== Variations ==
- Brändl was a bid of 3 tricks ranking below a Brand.
- Open Bettel was a Bettel played ouvert.

== Literature ==
- _ (1793). Die aufgedeckten und verrathenen Geheimnisse der falschen Spieler. Achen und Spaa.
- _ (1829). Neustes Allgemeines Spielbuch [NAS]. Vienna: C. Haas.
- _ (1983). "Brandeln" in Erweitertes Spielregelbüchlein aus Altenburg, Verlag Altenburger Spielkartenfabrik, Leipzig, pp. 54ff
- Bäuerle, Adolf (1819). Doctor Faust's Mantel. Vienna: Grund.
- Castelli, Ignaz Franz (1847). Wörterbuch der Mundart in Österreich unter der Enns. Vienna: Tendler.
- Georgens, Dr. Jan Daniel and Jeanne Marie Gayette-Georgens (1882). Spiel und Sport or Illustrirtes Allgemeines Familien-Spielbuch, Leipzig and Berlin: Otto Spamer.
- Grupp, Claus D. (1996/97) Kartenspiele im Familien und Freundeskreis. Revised and redesigned edition. Original edition. Niedernhausen/ Ts.: Falken. ISBN 3-635-60061-X, pp. 57ff.
- Kastner, Hugo and Gerald Kador Folkvord (2005). Die große Humboldtenzyklopädie der Kartenspiele. Baden-Baden: Humboldt. ISBN 3-89994-058-X, pp. 124ff.
- Löwenwolde, Christian Graf von (1781). Versuch eines Handbuches der Gesetze. 1740-1781. Graz: Franz Xav. Mueller.
- Mayer, Joseph (1863). Glaube, Hoffnung, Liebe; Volksdichtungen für den 18. August 1863. Vienna: Leopold Sommer.
- Müller J. F. (1830). Neuestes Spiel-Taschenbuch. [NST] 2nd revised edn. Ulm: J. Ebuerschen.
- Parlett, David (1992/96) Oxford Dictionary of Card Games. Oxford/New York: OUP.
- Parlett, David (2008). The Penguin Book of Card Games, Penguin, London. ISBN 978-0-141-03787-5
- Perinet, Joachim (1805). Die travestirte Telemach; eine Karrikatur mit Gesang in zwey Aufzügen. Vienna: Wallishausser.
- Pieper, Sven and Bärbel Schmidt (1994) Kartenspiele. Reclams Universalbibliothek, Vol. 4216, Stuttgart.
- Pierer, Heinrich August and Julius Löbe (eds.) (1857). "Brandeln" in Universal-Lexikon der Gegenwart und Vergangenheit. 4th edition, Vol. 3. Altenburg, p. 179 (zeno.org).
- Popowitsch, Johann Siegmund, Vocabula Austriaca et Stiriaca, ed. Richard Reutner, 4 vol. Frankfurt (2004). . Reprint of Adelung (1782). P. Lang.
- Richter, Joseph (1798). “Die” Wahrheit in Maske, Volumes 1-12.
- Rossi, J. A. (1849). Linzer Wochen-Bulletin für Theater Kunst und Belletristik. Linz: J. Schmid.
- Rulemann, Theodor (1909). Das große illustrierte Spielbuch. Berlin: Merkur.
- Schmeller, Johann Andreas (1827). Bayerisches Wörterbuch, pt 1. Stuttgart & Tübingen: J.G. Cotta.
- Schmid, Johann Christoph von (1795). Versuch eines schwäbischen Idiotikon, oder Sammlung der in verschiedenen schwäbischen Ländern und Städten gebräuchlichen Idiotismen: mit etymologischen Anmerkungen. Nicolai.
- Sedivy, Vladislav (2016). "Double Bohemian Cards - a nearly unknown standard" in The Playing-Card, Vol. 45, No. 2, Oct-Dec 2016.
- Tendler, F. (1830). Verstand und Glück im Bunde. [VGB] Vienna: F. J. P. Sollinger.
- Von Alvensleben, L. (1853). Encyclopädie der Spiele, pp.143f
