= Bronius Kutavičius =

Lithuanian composer (1932–2021)

- Born: Bronius Vaidutis Kutavičius; 13 September 1932; Molainiai, Panevėžys County, Lithuania
- Died: 29 September 2021 (aged 89); Vilnius, Lithuania
- Education: Lithuanian State Conservatory
- Occupations: Composer; Academic teacher
- Organizations: Čiurlionis School of Art; Lithuanian State Conservatory
- Awards: Lithuanian State Prize; Lithuanian National Prize for Culture and Arts

Bronius Kutavičius (13 September 1932 – 29 September 2021) was a Lithuanian composer and academic composition teacher. He wrote numerous oratorios and operas, often inspired by ancient Lithuanian polytheistic beliefs and music. He also composed film scores, orchestral works and chamber music. Kutavičius is regarded as a symbol of Lithuanian cultural identity, both in music and in politics. Among many awards, he received the Lithuanian State Prize in 1987.

== Life ==
Born in Molainiai, Panevėžys County, Kutavičius studied composition at the Lithuanian State Conservatory in Vilnius from 1959 to 1964, in Antanas Račiūnas's composition class. He studied Western techniques such as random operations, timbre experiments and spatial sound concepts (Zufallsoperationen, Klangfarbenexperimente und Raumklangkonzepte). From the 1970s, he studied the folklore of Lithuania, songs, dances, and cults, with ethnological methods. He composed numerous oratorios and operas, among them The Last Pagan Rites, inspired by ancient Lithuanian polytheistic beliefs and music. From the 1990s, he integrated musical cultures including countries such as Japan and Karelia. He worked from 1991 to 1995 on one of his major works, The Gates of Jerusalem, which earned him the Lithuanian State Prize in 1996. He composed his first opera in 2000, Lokys to a libretto by Aušra Marija Sluckaitė-Jurašienė based on the novella by Prosper Mérimée.

His music is performed at international festivals, including the Warsaw Autumn, the Huddersfield Contemporary Music Festival, Mare Balticum, Wratislavia Cantans, Vale of Glamorgan Festival, Spitalfields Festival, MaerzMusik, ISCM World Music Days in Vilnius.

Kutavičius was a member of the executive council of the Soviet-Lithuanian composers' association, but maintained an independent mindset without concessions to the occupation. His works inspired the movement towards independence in the 1980s.

Kutavičius taught composition at Čiurlionis School of Art from 1975, and at the Lithuanian Academy of Music and Theater from 1984, appointed professor a year later. He retired from teaching in 2000.

Kutavičius died in Vilnius at age 89.

== Works ==
Although an element of drama appears in compositions by Kutavičius, his first opera Lokys (The Bear), based on Mérimée's Lokis the Bear, was premiered in 2000, commissioned by the Vilnius Festival. The libretto is by Aušra Marija Sluckaitė-Jurašienė. The opera entered the repertoire of the Lithuanian National Opera and Ballet Theatre. A reviewer noted an eclectic style combining Nordic New Simplicity, elements of 20th-century neo-classicism, "multi-layered musical tapestries" including folk elements, and vocal lines "inherited" from Poland and Russia.

Kutavičius, whose ability to create an acoustic image of Lithuanian history has been acknowledged, received a commission from the state for a large-scale composition to commemorate the 750th anniversary of the coronation of King Mindaugas, Lithuania's only king, in 2003. In response, he wrote a diptych Ignis et fides (Fire and Faith), scored for vocal soloists, readers, choir, and symphony orchestra including folk instruments. The text is based on the first mention of the name of Lithuania in historical sources, and the king's coronation. The work combines elements of opera, ballet and oratorio.

Perhaps the most iconic work by Kutavičius is "Last Pagan Rites" (Paskutinės pagonių apeigos) for chorus, organ, and 4 horns, with text by Sigitas Geda (1978). This work has a ritualistic, ancestral character, as the singers recite mythic invocations (to the grasshopper, hill, serpent, oak). These simple melodic cells are repeated and layered, reminiscent of the sutartinė (traditional Lithuanian multi-part song form). In this case, however, Kutavičius also utilizes indeterminacy, as layers are performed freely (rhythmically independent of each other). Each movement of the piece requires a specific spatial arrangement of the singers in the performance space, and the non-standard graphical score also highlights the geometrical/spatial aspects of the performance (V. "Worship of the Oak Tree", for example, is notated on a circular staff). The final chords of the piece are a pseudo-Protestant hymn played on the organ, growing ever louder, symbolizing the Christianization of Lithuania, while the ancestral vocal layers dissolve and vanish.

The publisher Verlag Neue Musik describes the character of music by Kutavičius:

The work by Bronius Kutavičius transcends the sphere of pure music to enter much wider cultural domains. It uncovers centuries-old layers of history and reaches back to prehistoric times to speak in archetypes of mythical and religious consciousness. At the same time, Kutavičius' music is contemporary enough; it speaks to the modern audience in a novel language. Kutavičius is fluent in modern techniques such as serialism, sonorism, aleatoric, collage, repetitive minimalism (the last corresponds to the basic principles of ancient folk music), spatial organization of music and, consequently, innovative notation. The archaic and primeval in character music by Bronius Kutavičius, a composer on a mission of "cultural archaeology", is also no less rationalistic and mathematically exact. His precise and sometimes sophisticated sound systems are always full of life and strong emotions.

Compositions by Kutavičius include:

- Viola Sonata (1968)
- Ant kranto (On the Shore) for soprano and 4 violas (1972); words by Jonas Mekas
- Dzūkiškos Variacijos (Dzuk Variations) (1978)
- The Last Pagan Rites, oratorio (1978)
- Strazdas žalias paukštis (Thrush, the green bird), opera-poem (1981); libretto by Sigitas Geda
- Iš Jotvingių Akmens (From the Yotvingian stone) (1983)
- Pasaulio Medis (The tree of the world) (1986)
- The Gates of Jerusalem (1991–95)
- Epitaphium temporum pereunti (1998)
- Lokys (The Bear), opera (2000)
- Ignes et fides (Fire and Faith, 2003)
- Joys of Spring (2005)

== Recordings ==
A reviewer of a 2015 recording of The Seasons by Kutavičius noted described the composer as "a mesmerist who enfolds his audiences and listeners in trance-like music embedded in structures redolent of Pagan ritual", who uses minimalism in a personal way, where "repetitious are never sonically static", but in "constant accretion of colour and timbre, strong and striking intensifications".

Recordings of music by Kutavičius include:

=== LP ===
- 1971 – Avinuko Pėdos, vokalinis ciklas: V. Adamkevičius & Styginis kvintetas. Texts by O. Baliukonytė, V. Rudokas & S. Geda. Part of LP "Lietuvių Tarybinių Kompozitorių Kameriniai-Vokaliniai Kūriniai", Melodiya 33SM-2887-8 (10")
- 1973 – Stygnis Kvartetas No. 1 (1971): Vilniaus kvartetas. Together with string quartets by Vytautas Barkauskas & Vytautas Juozapaitis, Melodiya 33SM-04251/2
- 1978 – Prutyana ("Zanesennaya derevnya"): Leopoldas Digrys (organ), E. Digris (violin), L. Duker (bell), Melodiya 33 S10–10595-96
- 1980 – Metauela: Honoured song & dance Ensemble of Vilnius V. Kapsukas University, cond. V. Alexandavicius, Melodiya S30-11963/4
- 1979 – Dzūkiškos Variacijos (Dzuk Variations) / Praeities Laikrodžiai (Hours of the Past) / Mažasis Spektaklis (Little Play): Lietuvos kamerinis orkestras / Vilniaus kvartetas etc, Melodiya S10-12535/6
- 1979 – Eilės: Sigitas Geda: Nijolė Gelžinytė (reading) / Vilniaus Kvartetas, Melodiya S42-12623/4 (7")
- 1981 – Baroko siliaus variacijos: Vilniaus B. Dvariono Muzikos Mokyklos Strygnis Orkestras (String orchestra of the B. Dvarenas Music School, Vilnius), cond. Vitautas Kabelis, Melodiya S10-14359/60
- 1982 – Jubiliejinis koncertas (Jubilee Concert): Paskutinės Pagonių Apeigos (The Last Pagan Rites) / Du Paukščiai Girių Ūksmėj (Two Birds in the Thick of the Woods): Giedrė Kaukaitė / Vilniaus M. K. Čiurlionio vidurinės meno mokyklos choras dir. Rimantas Zdanavičius, Melodiya S10-18773/4
- 1985 – Lietuvių Kompozitorių Kūriniai Fortepijonui (Lithuanian Composers' Works for Piano) – Sonata. Together with works by V. Laurušas, F. Bajoras & Osvaldas Balakauskas: Birutė Vainiūnaitė, Melodiya S10 22333 006
- 1987 – 1953–1983: Trente Ans De Musique Sovietique: Paskutinės Pagonių Apeigos (The Last Pagan Rites). This is a repress of Melodiya side 18773 above, Le Chant du Monde LDC 78037 (5-LP set)
- 1990 – Iš Jotvingių Akmens (From the Yotvingian stone) / Pasaulio Medis (The Tree of the World), Melodiya S10-29285 009
- 1990 – Du koliažai: Liuda & Kęstutis Grybauskas – Fortepijoninis Duetas (Piano Duets), Melodiya S10 29435 008

=== CD ===
- 2001 Bronius Kutavičius: 1) Last Pagan Rites, oratorio for chorus, horn & organ. Leopoldas Digrys (organ), 2) Epitaphium Temporum Pereunti, symphony oratorio for chorus & orchestra Conductor Robertas Šervenikas. CD, Ondine
- 2003 Bronius Kutavičius opera Lokys (The Bear). 2CD, Ondine EAN 0761195102121
- 2015 Bronius Kutavičius The Seasons: Oratorio. CD, Toccata Classics. EAN 5060113442000

== Film scores ==
Film score by Kutavičius include:

- 1978 – Markizas ir piemenaitė, cond. Algirdas Dausa
- 1978 – Pasigailėk mūsų, cond. Algirdas Araminas
- 1979 – Mažos mūsų nuodėmės, cond. Henrikas Šablevičius
- 1980 – Rungtynės nuo 9 iki 9, cond. Raimondas Vabalas
- 1980 – Andrius (filmas), cond. Araminas
- 1982 – Vasara baigiasi rudenį, cond. Gytis Lukšas
- 1983 – Skrydis per Atlantą, cond. Vabalas
- 1988 – Žolės šaknys, cond. Lukšas
- 1988 – Mėnulio pilnaties metas, cond. Arūnas Žebriūnas
- 1990 – Strazdas – žalias paukštis, cond. Jonas Vaitkus
- 1990 – Miškais ateina ruduo, cond. Vabalas

== Video ==
- B. Kutavičius. Oratorio The Seasons following Kristijonas Donelaitis (first recording). Performers: chamber choir Jauna muzika, The Vilnius City Municipality St. Christopher Chamber Orchestra. Recitator – D. Meškauskas, Conductor D. Katkus (1 January 2012). B. Kutavičius. Oratorija "Metai" (Video) (in Lithuanian). LRT.

== Awards ==
Kutavičius received the Lithuanian State Prize in 1987 and the Lithuanian National Prize for Culture and Arts in 1995. He was awarded the prize of the Probaltica Festival in Toruń, Poland, in 1996 for his life's work. He was honoured in 1999 by the Order of the Lithuanian Grand Duke Gediminas, and the Polish Officers Cross Order of Poland. In 2003, he was induced in the Order "For Merits to Lithuania". Prizes from the Lithuanian Composers' Union included a prize for the best stage work for Ignis et fides in 2003, a prize for the best chamber work for the cello octet Andata e ritorno in 2008, and another prize for best stage work for his music for Carl Theodor Dreyer's silent film The Passion of Joan of Arc in 2010. He received the prize of the World Intellectual Property Organization in 2003, and a prize "Author of the Year" from the Agency of Lithuanian Copyright Protection Association in 2004.

== Personal life ==
He was married to a Lithuanian chess player Vilhelmina Kaušilaitė.
