= Lokys (opera) =

Lithuanian-language opera

Lokys is a 2000 Lithuanian-language opera by Bronius Kutavičius to a libretto by Aušra Marija Sluckaitė-Jurašienė based on the novella by Prosper Mérimée.

== Roles ==
- The Professor
- Count Semeta
- The Countess
- Julia, the count's fiancée
- The Doctor
- One-eyed old woman
- The Marshal

== Recording ==
- Lokys - The Bear Choir and Orchestra of the Lithuanian National Opera and Ballet Theatre, Martynas Staskus 2CD Ondine 2002
