= Lokys =

Lokys is a Lithuanian word for bear, and may also refer to:

- Lokys (river), Lithuania
- Lokys (village), Lithuania
- Lokys (opera), a 2000 opera by Bronius Kutavičius
- H23 Lokys, a Lithuanian Naval Force cutter

== See also ==
- Lokis (disambiguation)
