= Lokis (novella) =

Novella by Prosper Mérimée

Lokis. A Manuscript of Professor Wittembach (French: Lokis - Le manuscrit du professeur Wittembach) is an 1869 Prosper Mérimée horror fantasy novella. It was one of the last stories by Mérimée, started in July 1868 and published in the Revue des deux Mondes in September 1869. The title is a misspelling of the Lithuanian word lokys for "bear". The plot revolves around a young man who is suspected to be half-human half-bear. Robin MacKenzie from University of St Andrews classifies the plot into a werewolf theme with some elements of vampirism (the motif of drinking blood repeats through the work). The novella primarily deals with the dual nature of human–beast. It also contrasts Western education and Christianity with pagan Lithuanian rituals and beliefs, on more broadly – cultured civilization with primordial wilderness.

== Plot ==
The story is told from the point of view of an observer – professor Wittembach, a pastor and an amateur ethnographer - who comes to a Samogitian manor in rural Lithuania while on a mission to translate the Gospel of Matthew into Samogitian. The plot revolves around a young man, Count Michel Szémioth, who is suspected to be half-human half-bear, since he was born after his mother was mauled (and, as believed by peasants, raped) by a bear. Through the novel, the protagonist, Michel/Lokis, manifests signs of animal-like behavior until he finally kills his bride by a bite to her throat and runs away into the forest on his wedding night. Some critics consider the tale to be an inversion of the Beauty and the Beast, whereby the Beauty transforms a man into a Beast, rather than vice versa.

== Inspiration ==
Mérimée conceived the novella in spring 1867 as a contrast to horror stories often read at the court of Empress Eugenie. Intrigued by the human–beast duality, he quickly decided against a parody. It is believed that Mérimée borrowed the plot from the 13th-century Gesta Danorum, published in Revue des deux Mondes. Gesta Danorum includes a story of a girl kidnapped and impregnated by a bear. The girl gives birth to a son who exhibits violent sexual tendencies as an adult.

== Epigraph and title ==
"Miszka su Lokiu, Abu du tokiu" cited at the beginning of the novel as an epigraph to the manuscript is a slightly corrupted Lithuanian proverb "Meška su lokiu, abudu tokiu". The proverb was included in Lithuanian dictionaries by Georg Heinrich Ferdinand Nesselmann, published in 1851, and by August Schleicher, published in 1857, but judging by Mérimée's correspondence, he did not know about these publications and received the proverb from Ivan Turgenev. "Meška" and "lokys" are different names (synonyms) for the "bear" in Lithuanian, so the proverb almost literally means "Grizzly and bear are both the same." According to an (incorrect) explanation given by professor Wittembach at the end of the novella, "miszka" is not a Lithuanian word but a rendering of "Mishka", a Russian-language hypocoristic form of "Michael", the protagonist's name. In the English translation the proverb is footnoted with the following comment: "The two together make a pair"; word for word, Michon (Michael) with Lokis, both are the same. Michaelium cum Lokide, ambo [duo] ipsissimi.

== Inaccuracies ==
The novella draws elements, such as thunder god Perkūnas or cult of žaltys (grass snakes), from the pagan Lithuanian rituals and beliefs, but is not historically or culturally accurate. For example, the plot takes place in 1866, but the work does not address social or political situation after the January Uprising of 1863–1864. The extinction of the Prussian language is dated a full century later than it actually happened. The protagonist is a Protestant, though that is very rare in Catholic Samogitia. Some cultural elements, like rusalka or card games Durak and Preferans, were taken from Slavic (Russian) culture rather than Lithuanian.

== Adaptations ==
Film

- The Marriage of the Bear (1926), a Russian film by Konstantin Eggert and Vladimir Gardin. It was based on the 1922 Russian play with the same name (Russian: Медвежья свадьба) by Anatoli Lunacharsky loosely based on Lokis.
- Lokis (1970) by Janusz Majewski
- La Bête (1975) by Walerian Borowczyk, loosely based on the novella
- Massacre (2010) by Andrej Kudzinenka, a Belarusian film with the plot loosely based on Lokis and Belarusian legends.

Opera

- Lokys (2000) was commissioned by the Vilnius Festival (2000) to libretto by Aušra Marija Sluckaitė-Jurašienė and composition by Bronius Kutavičius. This afterwards entered the repertoire of the Lithuanian National Opera and Ballet Theatre.

== See also ==
- Jean de l'Ours ("John-of-the-Bear")
- Valentine and Orson
