= Wallachen =

Old Bavarian card game

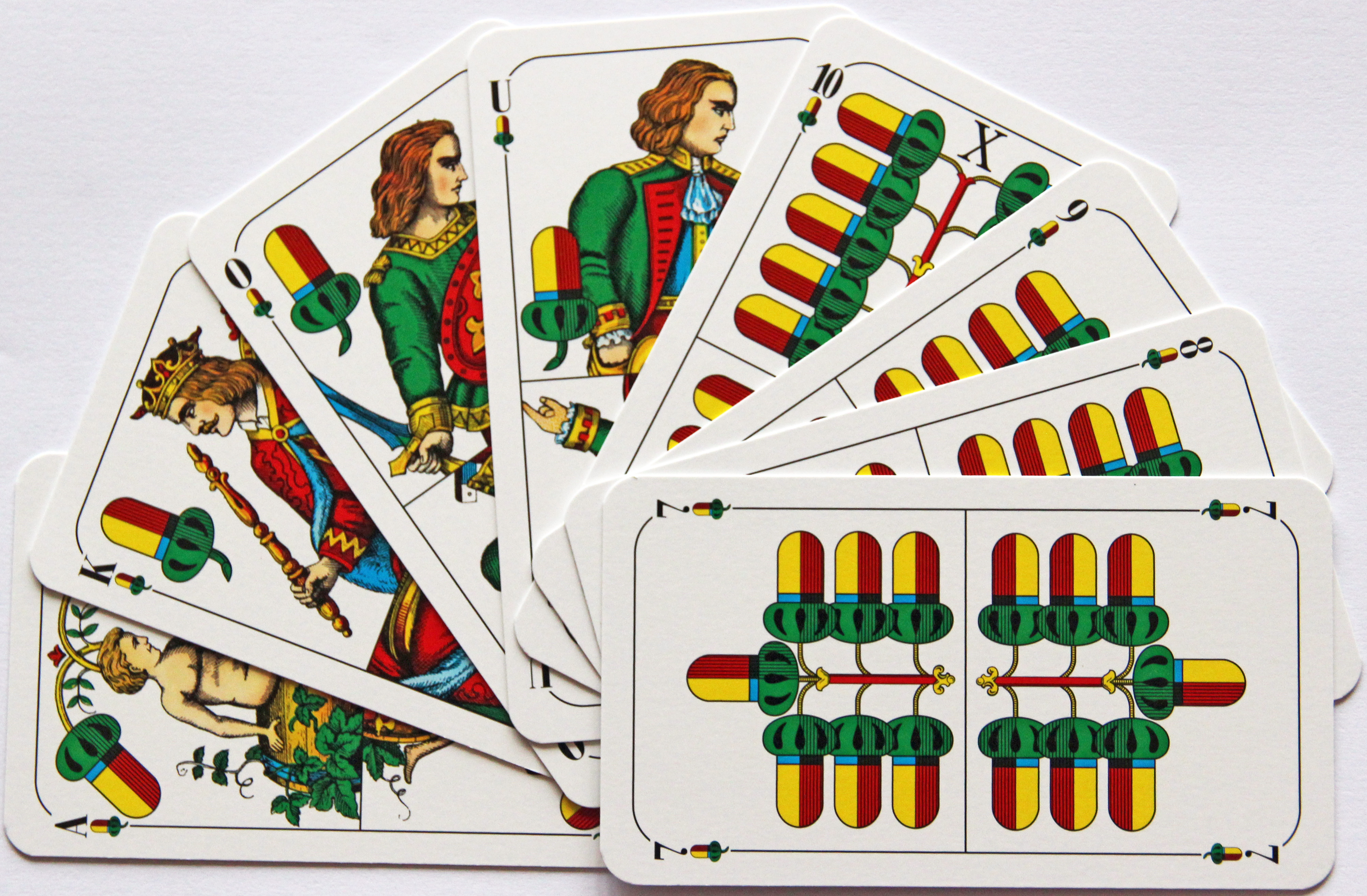
- The suit of Acorns from a Bavarian pack
- Origin: Bavaria
- Type: Plain-trick
- Players: 3
- Cards: 32
- Deck: German
- Rank (high→low): A K O U 10 9 8 7
- Play: Clockwise

Related games
- Preferans, Préférence, Bolachen
- Contracts: trick bidding plus Bettel and Mord

Wallachen is an Old Bavarian card game, which used to be very popular in eastern Bavaria. Although, by 2012, it had become a rarer sight at pub tables, there have been more recent moves to revive it. Wallachen is a relatively simple three-hander that is easy to learn. As a result, like Grasobern, it has a relatively relaxed character without the mental demands of Schafkopf or the psychological stress of Watten. It is a member of the Préférence family of card games.

== History and distribution ==
Wallachen appears to have originally come from the Bohemian area. It emerges in the literature as early as 1784, as Wallacho or Walacho, when it was added along with Macao to a long list of banned gambling games across the Austro-Hungarian Empire, is locally banned in Bohemia in 1830, and continues to be banned until at least 1851 in Austria-Hungary (Note: In some sources it is listed as "Wallacho (Wallachen)", thus confirming the link, see e.g. Goutta, Wilhelm Gerhard (1821). Sammlung der Gesetze, Volume 45, p. 202.) In a 1798 account, Wallachen is played under the name of Preference in order to "thumb the nose" at the law. The game is not dissimilar to the widely popular Préférence for which Piatnik continue to produce bespoke packs today.

In 1853, the Lower Bavarian Historical Society reported that Bavarians were "lovers of all games and especially card games." Certain games were as regionally defined as village costumes and modes of house construction. "For example, the game of Wallach (Wallachspiel) is played from the eastern Tyrol down to this area [ Landshut ] as a unique folk game", yet west of the upper Inn and the lower Isar it is not known under that name.

In 1875, Wallachen is described as a favourite pastime of certain gentlemen in Bavarian Vilsbiburg along with Quadrille and Stichbrandeln. And again, in the Rott valley during the early 19th century, a favourite pastime of the men was playing cards of which Wallachen was one of the most common, alongside Stichbrandeln and Zwicken. The farmers often played late into the night, despite the presence of local policemen. Their wives did not approve of this and often gave told their menfolk off in no uncertain terms and with choice expressions.

The game goes under various other names depending on the region, for example in the area of Grafenau in eastern Bavaria it is also called Säbeln ("Sabre"). Other spelling variants include Wallach, Wallacha, Walachen, Wallachan (Bavarian) or Wallachern. According to Rohrmayer (2015), after Schafkopf and Watten, Wallachen is probably still the most widely played card game in Old Bavaria (especially East Bavaria including Regensburg) and therefore an indispensable part of Bavarian pub culture. The terminology for the contracts - Brand, Bettel and Mord - may be derived from the old German game of Brandeln, which dates to the 17th century.

Courses were being run in places like Schierling as recently as 2019.

== Cards ==
Like Schafkopf, Wallachen is played with German playing cards of the Bavarian pattern. These are usually marketed as Tarock/Schafkopf packs of 36 cards. The Sixes are removed as in Schafkopf and Grasobern.

Suits of the German pack
Bells (Schellen)	Hearts (Herz)	Leaves (Gras)	Acorns (Eichel)

== Aim ==
The aim is to win six or more tricks out of a total of ten. Players usually play for small sums of money, but they may also keep score by using counters or recording points.

== Card ranking ==
=== Trick-taking power ===
For trick-taking the cards rank as follows (from highest to lowest): Sow (Sau) (Deuce, marked "A") > King > Ober > Unter > 10 > 9 > 8 > 7.

Card values within the four suits
Acorns	Leaves	Hearts	Bells
A K O U 10 9 8 7	A K O U 10 9 8 7	A K O U 10 9 8 7	A K O U 10 9 8 7

=== Trumps ===
In the normal game, the card led to the first trick determines the trump suit for the hand. Within the trump suit cards rank as shown above and all trumps outrank other suit cards. There are no trumps in Bettel and Mord.

== Playing ==
=== Dealing ===
Dealer shuffles the pack, offers it to middlehand to cut and then deals ten cards each, either in two packets of 5 or in two packets of 4 and one of 2 or in three packets of 3, 4 and 3 cards respectively. Two cards are then dealt to a start. Each player has a doubling token such as a coin or matchbox in front of them. After the first 3 cards have been dealt to each player, the deal is paused while players look at these cards, and any player may 'double' (doppeln) the stake by pushing their token called the Doppler (formerly a matchbox, usually a coin) forwards. For example if all three players do this the stake is multiplied by 8 for this deal.

=== Auction ===
The player to the left of the dealer, forehand, begins the auction by announcing whether to will "play" (ich spiele) or "pass" (weiter). If forehand plays and the other two players agree and forehand does not raise the bid, forehand becomes the declarer and has to take six tricks to win. If, however, the next player in clockwise order, middlehand, also wants to play, he has to outbid forehand by announcing "Seven" (Sieben), which commits him to taking at least seven tricks. Forehand may respond by equalling middlehand's bid with "me too" or "hold" (Selber or ich halte). Forehand and middlehand continue to bid until one gives up by saying "pass". Next, the dealer has the opportunity to outbid the highest bid so far. The highest bidder becomes the declarer and plays against the other two 'defenders'.

Once the bidding reaches the point where two players both bid ten tricks, the next highest bid is a Bettel. Bettel in turn can be outbid by Mord, the highest contract.

Once the declarer (or soloist) has been determined, he may pick up the two cards from the start, choose the most favourable hand and discard two cards, face down, back to the start. The start plays no further part in the game.

It is possible that the two cards from the start change the soloist's tactics or even undermine them. On the one hand, he may decide to stick with the number of tricks he first announced. On the other hand, he may increase the number of tricks bid, or change his contract to Bettel or Mord (the latter is called Kini in some regions). In Bettel, the player must not take a single trick, in Mord he must take all of them. So Bettel corresponds to Bettel in Schafkopf and Grasoberln or to Null in Skat; Mord corresponds to the Tout from Schafkopf.

Bid summary

From lowest to highest the possible bids are: Six, Seven, Eight, Nine, Bettel, Mord. In Sirch's variant, which may represent an earlier form of the game, there are only three bids: Brand, Beddl [sic] and Mord. This is also the case in Bolachen, however if two players bid a Brand, the player with the higher ranking suit takes precedence (the order from lowest to highest being: Acorns, Leaves, Bells, Hearts).

=== Raising the game value ===
Before the end of the first round, players may raise the game value by announcing Kontra or Re. Each Kontra or Re doubles the stakes. For Bettel and Mord there is a higher pre-agreed tariff.

=== Playing ===
Once the declarer has decided whether to play the announced game or switch to Bettel or Mord, he discards two unwanted cards to the start and leads to the first trick. The soloist always leads, regardless of his position with respect to the dealer. The led card determines the trump suit and so the two defenders must play a trump if they have one. Players must follow suit and must play a higher card, if able. If unable to follow they must trump and overtrump if possible. Whoever wins the trick leads to the next trick. Players may ask to see the last trick taken by their opponent(s).

In some places, the defenders may indicate a blank card by tapping clearly audibly on the table when discarding the only or last remaining card of a suit.

=== Scoring ===
After all the cards have been played, the tricks are counted. The soloist must take at least as many tricks as announced in order to win. If he wins, he receives the pre-agreed stake from each of the defenders for each trick taken. If the soloist loses, he has to pay the stake for the announced number of tricks to each defender. The game score is calculated as follows: payment = the agreed stake per trick x number of tricks. This game value may, however, be doubled before the game starts through the announcements of "Kontra" and "Re" and/or the Doppeln.

If no player wants to 'play', forehand becomes the soloist. Alternatively, each player may pay an additional stake into the 'pot' for the winner of the next game.

== Strategy ==
The difficulty in Wallachen is in accurately estimating the number of tricks that one can take and then bidding correctly. In addition, the soloist must discard the right cards after picking up the start.

== Similarities ==
Wallachen bears similarities to the four-player game of Brandle as well as Austrian Préférence, indeed Geiser states that Préférence is called Walàcheln or Walàchen in Bavaria. However, a major difference is that there is no suit hierarchy in Wallachen. By contrast, Bavarian Tarock, albeit superficially similar with respect to the dealing of cards and the auction, is a point-trick, ace–ten game.

== See also ==
- Bolachen – a simpler version of Wallachen.

== Literature ==
- _ (1853). Historischer Verein für Niederbayern: Verhandlungen des Historischen Vereins für Niederbayern. Landshut: J.F. Rietsch.
- Geiser, Remigius (2004). "100 Kartenspiele des Landes Salzburg" (PDF). Talon (13). Archived from the original (PDF) on 27 August 2018.
- Kingdom of Bohemia (1832). Provinzial-Gesetzsammlung des Königreichs Böhmen für das Jahr 1830, Volume 12. Prague: Schönfeld.
- Koppel, Johann (1851). Handbuch der österreichischen Strafgesetze über Vergehen und Übertretungen. Olmüz: Eduard Hölzel.
- Muhr, Gisela (2014). Spritz! Z'rück! un druff! Rheinbach: Regionala.
- Richter, Joseph (1798). Die Wahrheit in Maske, Volume 6. Vienna: Peter Rehm.
- Rohrmayer, Erich (2015). Lerne Wallachen: Eine Spielanleitung für Anfänger, 1st edition. Amberg, Buch & Kunstverlag Oberpfalz. ISBN 9 783955 870232
- Roth, Johann Wenzl (1787). Vollständiger Auszug aller für das Königreich Böheim unter glorreichester Regierung Joseph des Zweyten ergangenen Gesetzen. Vol. 2. Prague: k.k. Normalschulbuchdruckerey.
- Sirch, Walter (2008). Vom Alten zum Zwanzger - Bayerische Kartenspiele für Kinder und Erwachsene - neu entdeckt. Bayerischer Trachtenverband. Traunstein: Chiemgau-Druck.
