= Bolachen =

German card game

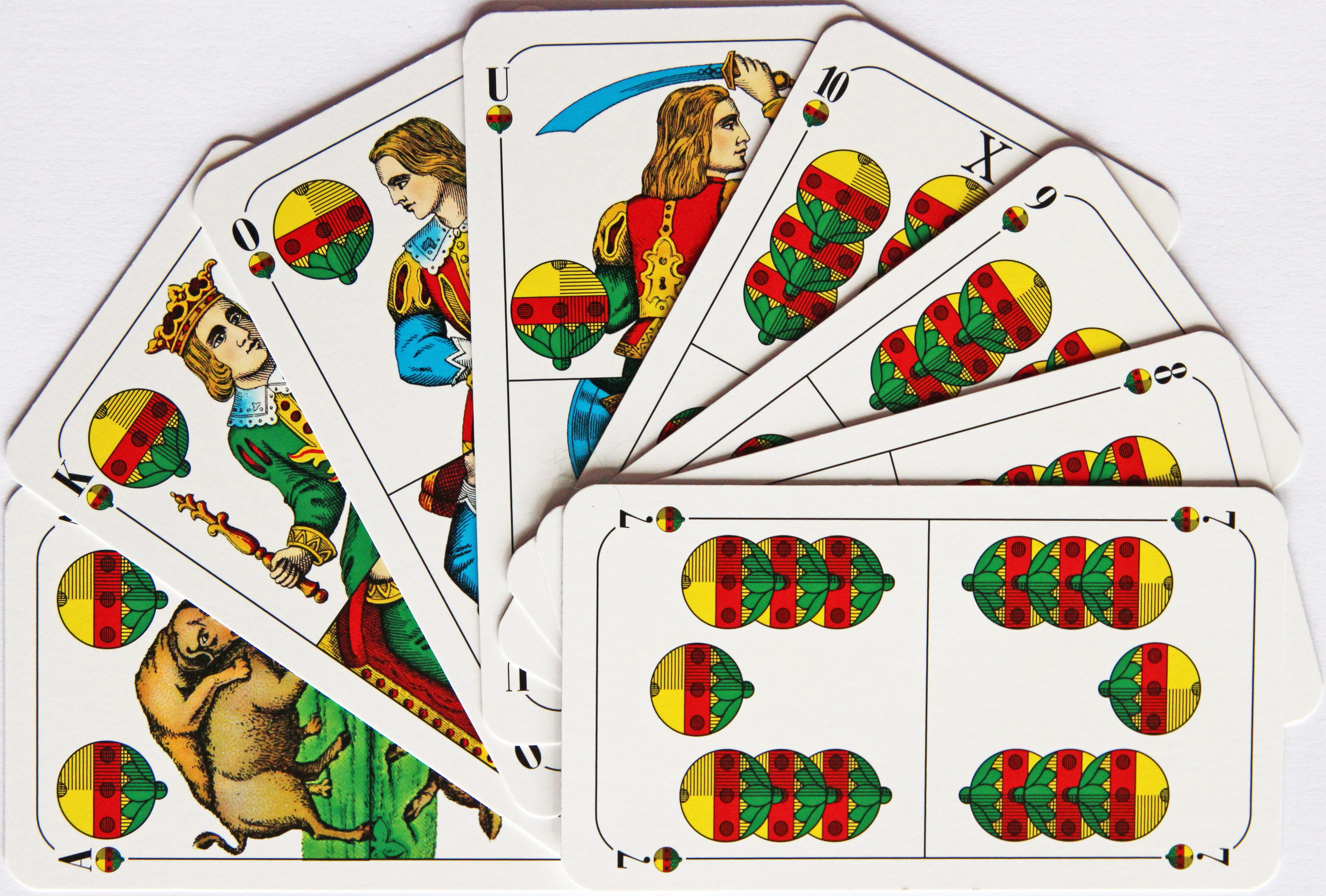
- The suit of Bells from a Bavarian pack
- Origin: Bavaria, Germany
- Type: Plain-trick
- Players: 3
- Cards: 32
- Deck: German
- Rank (high→low): A K O U 10 9 8 7
- Play: Clockwise

Related games
- Wallachen
- Contracts: suit bidding plus Bettel and Mord

Bolachen (the stress is on the second syllable; the "e" is also sounded) is a traditional card game for 3 players that is played in parts of southern Upper Bavaria, especially in the Rupertiwinkel area of the Berchtesgaden Land, where there is a cultural influence from Salzburg, and the state of Salzburg itself. It is a Bavarian variant of the more complex, old Austrian game of Préférence. Like its Bavarian cousin, Wallachen, Bolachen is threatened by extinction.

== History ==
The origin of Bolachen is not exactly clear; today, it is mainly found in southern Upper Bavaria. However, like the similar but more complex Wallachen, it is rarely played anymore and is thus threatened with extinction. It is probably the variant or synonym of Préférence described by Geiser as "Polachen", especially as the unusual suit order is identical with that of Préférence. In which case, the name means playing [the game of] Polack, Polachen being a derivative of Polacke, an old German word for a Pole, derived in turn from Polak or Polack, the Polish word for Pole, noting that the stress is also on the second syllable, a long "a". The game may therefore be of Polish origin. The terminology for the contracts - Brand, Bettel and Mord - may be derived from the old German game of Brandeln. In the Salzburg dialect, the game is called Polächeln and in the Styria, Polackel or Polawitzeln. An 1847 Austrian dialect dictionary for the Lower Enns gives Bolawitzeln as a popular game amongst rural folk in "V.O.M.B." Ziller gives the explanation of the name as the term polakieren, "to fleece" or "deceive" which, in turn, is derived from Polagge (also Klapper), a Styrian word meaning "a rattle". However, Unger equates Polawitzeln (also Polarigeln) to the gambling game of Mauscheln.

== Cards ==
=== Suits ===
Bolachen, like Schafkopf, is played with a German pack of Bavarian pattern cards. These are usually marketed under the name Tarock/ Schafkopf and contain 36 cards. For Wallachen and many other Bavarian card games the Sixes are removed.

When determining the soloist (also called the declarer), the suits rank in the same order as in Préférence (in a Brand contract):

Hearts > Bells > Leaves > Acorns

Suits of the German pack
Hearts (Herz)	Bells (Schellen)	Leaves (Gras)	Acorns (Eichel)

=== Ranking ===
The ranking of cards for trick-taking is:

Sow (Ace) > King > Ober > Unter > 10 > 9 > 8 > 7

== Aim ==
The aim for the declarer is to win his chosen contract which, in ascending order are:

- Brand. The normal game. Declarer names trumps and must take at least 6 of the 10 tricks to win.
- Bettel. Declarer must not take a trick.
- Mord. Declarer must take every trick.

The aim of the two defenders is to thwart the declarer. Like Wallachen, it is usually played for small monetary stakes, which enables, for example, a limit to be set as the winner's target.

== Deal ==
Dealer shuffles the cards and deals as follows: first, a packet of 3 cards each, beginning with forehand to the dealer's left; next, 2 cards to the table as the dopper (= skat); then a packet of 4 cards each; and finally another packet of 3 cards each. Thus each player ends with 10 cards and 2 go to the dopper.

The deal rotates clockwise with each hand.

== Auction ==
After the deal, there is an auction in which players may bid to become the declarer and play one of the three contracts. Forehand opens by announcing whether to "play" or "pass". The next player does likewise. If neither wants to play a contract, then the dealer must do so.

The player bidding the highest value contract wins the auction and becomes the declarer. Contracts rank in ascending order as follows: Acorn Brand > Leaf Brand > Bell Brand > Heart Brand > Bettel > Mord. If two players want to play the same contract, the player who announced it first, i.e. is the nearest to the dealer's left, has positional priority.

In a Brand, the declarer normally nominates the trump suit after picking up the dopper. However, if more than one player bids a Brand, they compare suits and the one with the higher suit wins and becomes declarer. Thereafter the declarer may play the announced contract or switch to a higher value one e.g. having bid a Bell Brand, Stefan may raise it to a Heart Brand, Bettel or Mord.

== Exchanging ==
In a Brand, declarer may pick up the dopper and exchange one or both of cards, but must reduce to 10 cards before play.

In a Mord or Bettel, before picking up the dopper, declarer may call for a specific card from another player, which that player has to exchange with the declarer in return for a card of the dealer's choice. Then the declarer may exchange with the dopper. If perchance the called card lies in the dopper, there is no exchange.

== Play ==
Up to 10 tricks are now played for. Declarer leads to the first trick; thereafter, the player who wins the trick leads to the next. Rules of play are as follows:

- In Brand the declarer nominates a trump suit; Bettel and Mord are played at no trump.
- The highest trump wins the trick or the highest card of the led suit if there are no trumps.
- Players must follow suit if able, otherwise must trump and overtrump if able.
- Players must head the trick if possible, i.e. overtake the card or cards already played to the trick if possible, subject to the requirement to follow suit.
- Exception :if the declarer led to the trick and has been beaten by the first defender, the second defender must follow the led suit if possible, but is released from the requirement to head the trick.

The hand ends when all 10 tricks have been played or earlier if it becomes clear that the declarer has won or lost the bid contract. For example, a Brand ends as soon as the declarer has taken 6 tricks; a Bettel ends early if the declarer takes a trick and a Mord ends early if the declarer loses a trick.

== Scoring ==
The contracts are valued as follows:

- Brand: 1 unit e.g. 10¢
- Bettel: 2 units e.g. 20¢
- Mord: 3 units e.g. 30¢

The declarer is paid the game value by each defender if the bid game is won. If it is lost, the declarer pays the game value to each defender.

The game uses the same scoring system as Wallachen. If playing for soft score, players record their positive and negative scores on a scoresheet. In a Brand the declarer scores +2 for a win and -2 for losing; each defender scores -1 or +1 respectively. These scores are doubled for a Bettel and tripled in a Mord.

When playing for hard score, if the tariff is 10¢, the declarer earns 10¢ from each defender for winning a Brand or pays 10¢ to each one for losing. These payments are doubled in the case of a Bettel and trebled for a Mord. Sometimes a Mord is paid at 50¢ instead of 30¢.

== Literature ==
- Castelli, Ignaz Franz (1847). Wörterbuch der Mundart in Österreich unter der Enns. Vienna: Tendler.
- Orlowski, Hubert (1996). "Polnische Wirtschaft": zum deutschen Polendiskurs der Neuzeit. Wiesbaden: Harrassowitz.
- Rohrmayer, Erich (2015). Lerne Wallachen. Amberg: Buch- und Kunstverlag Oberpfalz. ISBN 978-3-95587-023-2
- Schröder, Heinrich (1906). Beiträge zur germanischen Sprach- und Kulturgeschichte, Vol. 2. C. Winter.
- Unger, Theodor (1903). Steirischer Wortschatz als Ergänzung zu Schmellers Bayerischem Wörterbuch. Graz: Leuschner & Lubestutz.
- Ziller, Leopold (1995). Was nicht im Duden steht: ein Salzburger Mundart-Wörterbuch. Eigenverlag der Gemeinde St. Gilgen am Wolfgangsee.

== See also ==
- Wallachen
