= Gustaw Lutkiewicz =

Polish actor and singer (1924–2017)

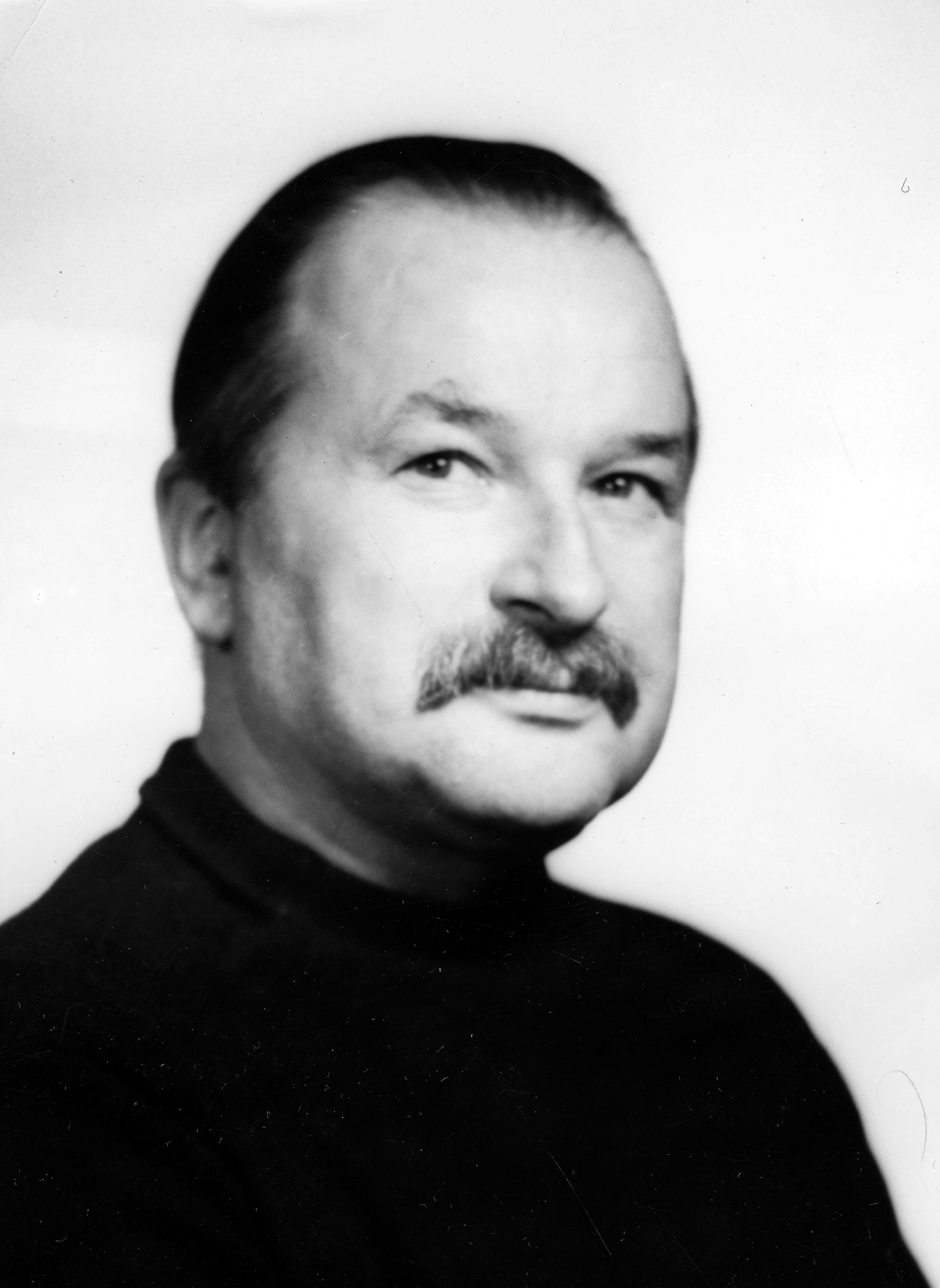
- Gustaw Lutkiewicz
- Born: 29 June 1924; Kaunas, Lithuania
- Died: 24 February 2017 (aged 92); Warsaw, Poland
- Occupation: Actor
- Years active: 1948-2010
- Spouse: Wiesława Mazurkiewicz

Gustaw Lutkiewicz (29 June 1924 – 24 February 2017) was a Polish actor and singer.

He was born to a Polish family in Kaunas.

He was awarded the Knight's Cross of the Order of Polonia Restituta in 1970, the Officer's Cross in 1985 and the Medal for Merit to Culture - Gloria Artis in 2012.

== Selected filmography ==
- 2000: Syzyfowe prace
- 1999: With Fire and Sword under Jerzy Hoffman.
- 1991: Life for Life: Maximilian Kolbe (as Konior) under Krzysztof Zanussi
- 1989: Konsul
- 1985: C.K.Dezerterzy
- 1984: Przeklęte oko proroka
- 1984: A Year of the Quiet Sun (as Bakery Owner) under Krzysztof Zanussi
- 1973: Copernicus
- 1970: Lokys (as Froeber)
- 1964: Nieznany (as Florczak)
- 1961: Ludzie z pociągu (as Kwaśniewski)
- 1960: Walet pikowy
- 1957: Ewa chce spać
- 1957: Prawdziwy koniec wielkiej wojny (as Henryk Thiel)
- 1956: Nikodem Dyzma
