= Jauna muzika =

Chamber choir in Vilnius, Lithuania

Jauna muzika is a chamber choir in Vilnius, Lithuania, formed in 1989 The members of the choir are professional musicians - graduates and students of the Lithuanian Academy of Music. Depending on the repertoire being performed, the number of the singers ranges from 24 to 50. Ingrida Alonderė is the current choir director. Since 1992 the choir is led by composer and conductor Vaclovas Augustinas.

== History/Current ==
From 1990 to 1996, the choir won 15 first prizes in various categories and six Grand Prix in 16 international choral competitions around the world. In 1993 the choir was awarded the highest prize, the Grand Prix Europeo, in a competition organised by the International Federation for Choral Music in Varna, Bulgaria. In 1994 Jauna muzika became the Vilnius municipal choir and is currently one of the most active groups in Lithuania. Since 2006 the choir concert base is in St. Catherine's Church in Vilnius.

Alongside a cappella works, the choir appears with Lithuanian and foreign chamber and symphony orchestras, including the Jerusalem Symphony Orchestra, Deutsches Symphonie-Orchester Berlin, and others in Germany, Israel, and Russia. The choir has performed with many known musicians, including cellist Mark Drobinsky, singer Robin Blaze, cantor Joseph Malovany, and famous Lithuanian singers, such as Virgilijus Noreika, and others. An important part of the activities of Jauna muzika is representation of the Lithuanian choral art in foreign countries. Their concerts abroad have featured compositions by classical and contemporary composers. The choir has toured in Europe, China, Japan and Israel.

Besides performances, the Jauna Muzika has organized a number of projects in Lithuania. Every year since 1995, the choir has held workshops on choir conducting and interpretation. In the autumn of 1998, on the initiative of the choir, an international festival Eternal Jerusalem was held in the major concert halls of Vilnius - the Lithuanian National Philharmonic Hall, the Lithuanian National Opera and Ballet Theatre, and the Vilnius Town Hall. In 2000, together with the Vilnius Town Hall Festival, Jauna muzika invited the lovers of baroque music to a concert series English and French Baroque Music, in which The King's Consort from Great Britain and Il Seminario Musicale from France appeared, and, in 2001, to The Days of German and Polish Baroque Music, which featured Musica Antiqua Köln from Germany and Capella Gedanensis from Poland. In 2002, the choir put on a series of five concerts, which was devoted to the rebuilding of the Vilnius Evangelical Lutheran Church.
