= Preferans =

Trick-taking game

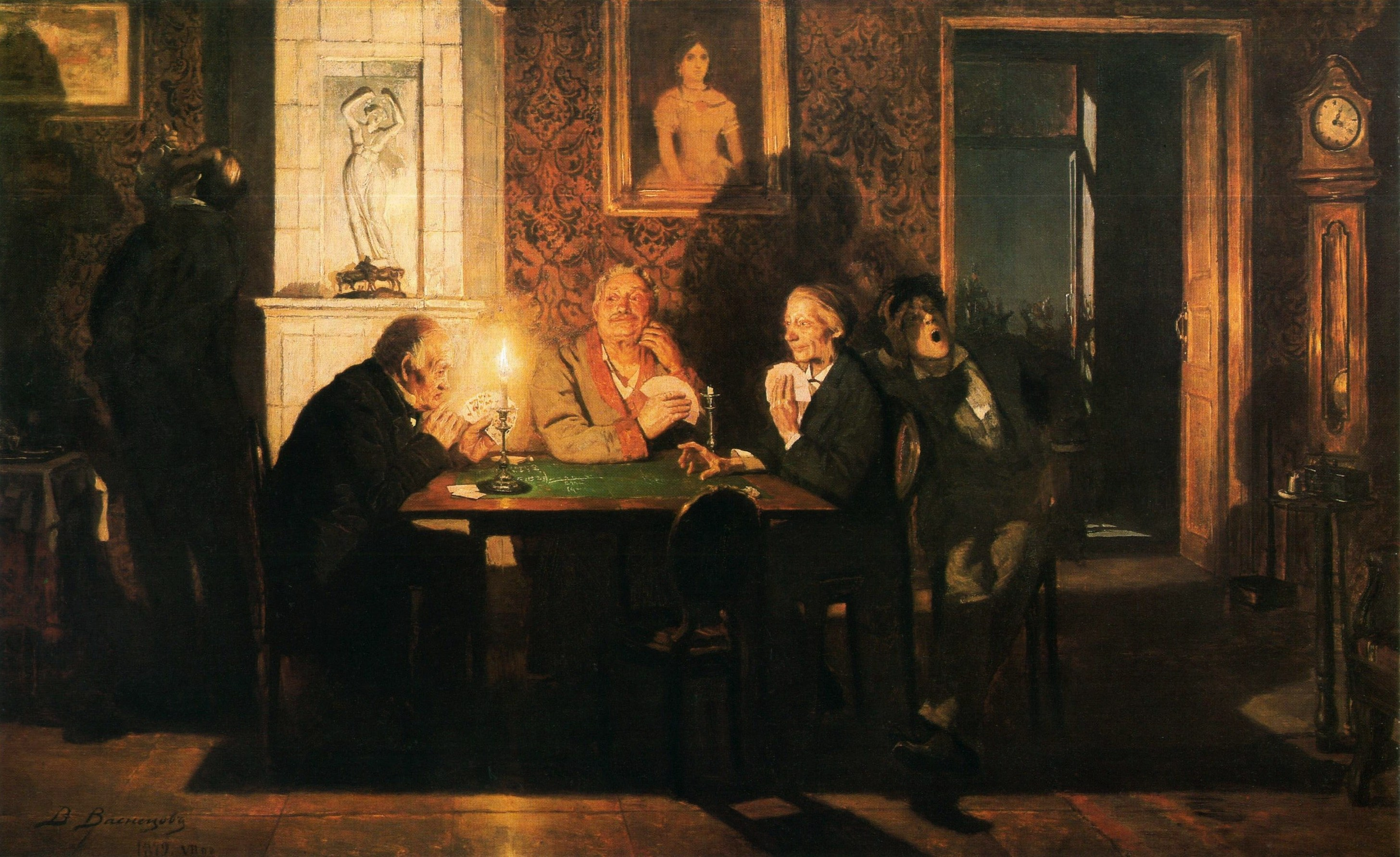
- Préférence, a painting by Viktor Vasnetsov
- Origin: Russia
- Alternative names: Prefa
- Family: Trick-taking
- Players: 2, 3 or 4
- Cards: 32
- Deck: French
- Play: Clockwise

Related games
- Ombre • Whist • Préférence • Wallachen

Preferans (Russian: преферанс, IPA: [prʲɪfʲɪˈrans]) or Russian Preference is a 10-card plain-trick game with bidding, played by three or four players with a 32-card Piquet deck. It is a sophisticated variant of the Austrian game Préférence, which in turn descends from Spanish Ombre and French Boston. It is renowned in the card game world for its many complicated rules and insistence on strategical approaches.

Popular in Russia since approximately the 1830s, Preferans quickly became the country's national card game. Although superseded in this role by Durak, it is still one of the most popular games in Russia. Similar games are played in various other European countries, from Lithuania to Greece, where an earlier form of Russian Preferans is known as Prefa (Greek: Πρέφα). Compared to Austrian Préférence, Russian Preferans and Greek Prefa are distinguished by the greater number of possible contracts, which allows for almost any combination of trumps and numbers of tricks. Another distinguishing feature is the relatively independent roles played by the opponents of the soloist.

== Overview ==
Preferans is played by three active players with a French-suited 32-card piquet deck. Aces rank high and tens rank in their natural position between jacks and nines. As happens with many three-player trick-taking games, the game is frequently played by four players using the convention that in each hand the dealer pauses. Each active player receives 10 cards in batches of 2. The remaining 2 cards form a talon that will be used by the declarer to improve their hand. The deal typically follows the scheme: 2–talon–2–2–2–2....

Also two players can play Preferans. This variation is called hussar (Russian: Гусарик, Gusarik). In this variation cards are dealt for three players. The third player is called dummy, his cards are not opened during bidding. If someone wins a bidding and the second player decides to whist, his and dummy's hands will be displayed face-up on the table and the defender will play in the light as in the game with three or four players.

A bidding process is used to decide which player declares the trump suit, as well as the contract, which is the required number of tricks the soloist must attain. The soloist is known as the declarer, and the declarer's objective is to win the contracted number of tricks, while the defenders' main objective is to prevent this.

Trick-play differs from Whist in that there is an obligation to trump. The eldest hand leads to the first trick. Players must follow suit if possible, else trump if possible. The trick is won by the player who played the highest trump or the highest card of the suit led. The winner of a trick leads to the next trick.

== Bidding and contracts ==
Bids and contracts
bid					tricks	whist	value
6♠	6♣	6♦	6♥	6NT	≥6	≥4	2
7♠	7♣	7♦	7♥	7NT	≥7	≥2	4
8♠	8♣	8♦	8♥	8NT	≥8	≥1	6
misère					0	–	10
9♠	9♣	9♦	9♥	9NT	≥9	≥1	8
10♠	10♣	10♦	10♥	10NT	10	≥1	10

Beginning with the eldest hand, players bid for the privilege of declaring the contract and trump suit and playing as the soloist. Each bid consists of a number from 6 to 10 that indicates the minimum number of tricks to be won by the declarer and a trump suit. The ranking is first by number of tricks and then by suit as follows: spades, clubs, diamonds, hearts, and no trumps (in ascending order). A special bid, misère, ranks between 8 tricks with no trumps and 9 tricks with spades.

The bidding can last several rounds until all players but one pass. At the beginning of each round, the eldest hand can make a bid that only needs to be as high as the highest bid so far. Otherwise each bid must be higher than the previous one. A player who has passed may not bid again later, and a player who wants to bid misère must not make any other bids before or after. If no player bids at all, a special all-pass game is played (Russian: raspasovka). Misère and all-pass games are special in that the object is to avoid tricks rather than win them. Both are described in their own sections below.

The highest bidder becomes the declarer. The declarer shows the two cards in the talon to the defenders before adding them to their hand and discarding any two cards face down. Unless the declarer's bid was misère, the declarer then declares any contract that ranks at least as high as the highest bid.

In trick-play, the declarer must win at least the number of tricks indicated in the contract. If successful, the declarer wins the value of the contract in pool points (×10). If not successful (a situation called remise), the declarer loses the value of the contract multiplied by the number of undertricks (tricks missing) in dump points (×10), and also pays the same amount to each defender in whist points (×1).

=== Whisting ===
An unusual feature of Preferans is that the defenders have their own secondary objectives in addition to the objective of preventing the declarer from keeping the contract. Moreover, defenders may drop out of trick-play or may play with open cards.

Beginning with the player who sits to the left of the declarer, each defender indicates whether he or she wants to whist. If neither defender wants to whist, the declarer wins automatically without playing out the hand. The declarer scores the value of the contract, and no other scoring takes place. In addition, if the declarer plays a 6- or 7-trick game, the second player chooses whether they will "half-whist" or "whist," rather than the usual "pass" or "whist". If the player forgets to declare "half-whist" or "whist", they will not gain any points. That means he writes whists on the declarer as if he took 2 tricks in a 6-trick game and 1 in a 7-trick one.

A second incentive for whisting, besides the chance of spoiling the declarer's contract, is that the whisting players are paid the value of the contract in whist points (×1) from the declarer for each trick they win, regardless of whether the declarer or the defender wins their respective required number of tricks. If there is only one whister, then that player also gets the whist points for the tricks won by the other defender (known as a greedy whist). There also exists a convention that if the declarer has failed to achieve his contract, the whists won by the whister are divided equally between the whister and the other player (known as gentlemanly whist). However, there are significant penalties for the whister(s) if the defenders fail to win enough tricks. The required number is 4 tricks if the declarer undertook to win 6 tricks, 2 tricks if the declarer undertook to win 7 tricks, and 1 trick if the declarer's contract is for 8 tricks or more. (See table above.)

If precisely one of the defenders decides to whist, then that player has a choice between playing normally and playing in the light. In the latter case, both defenders' hands are displayed face-up on the table and the whister plays from both hands, similar to contract bridge. In any case, only the whister will score for this hand, positively or negatively.

If the defenders do not win the required number of tricks and there is only a single whister, then the whister loses the value of the contract in dump points (×10) for each undertrick. If this happens when there are two whisters, then the penalty is distributed fairly among them according to the principle that each whister is only responsible for their own undertricks with respect to half the required number of tricks. However, if the required number of tricks was 1, then it cannot be divided by 2 and the second whister is deemed responsible (the justification of that rule is that if the second whister passed, the first whister would be able playing in the light with open cards, which generally provides more chances to defend against and possibly defeat a high contract).

When the first defender decides not to whist against a contract for 6 or 7 tricks, the other defender has a third option besides passing and whisting. In this case the second defender may half-whist, in which case trick-play does not take place and the declarer and the second defender each score as if both sides had won their required number of tricks and the defenders' tricks had been shared equally between both. The first defender does not score. However, if the second defender wants to half-whist, the first defender gets a second chance to whist, in which case trick-play and scoring are done normally.

== Scoring system ==
Score sheet for four players

The Preferans scoring system has three different kinds of points. The basic unit, whist points, is used for payments from one player to another. Pool points can only be won by winning a game as declarer (or by winning no tricks at all in an all-pass game). Dump points are used for keeping track of the penalties that declarers or whisters have to pay for not winning the required number of tricks. A pool point or dump point is worth 10 whist points.

The scoring system as described so far is known as Sochi scoring, after the city of Sochi. To summarize:

- The declarer wins the contract value in pool points or loses the contract value times the number of undertricks in dump points and pays the same amount to each opponent.
- For each defender trick, the declarer pays the contract value in whist points to the appropriate whister.
- If the defenders do not win their quota of tricks, they collectively lose the contract value times the number of undertricks in dump points. (Distributed fairly among the whisters.)

Leningrad scoring is similar to Sochi scoring. All dump and whist scores are doubled when writing down scores, but not the pool scores. However, the pool scores are doubled at the end of the game before calculating its outcome.

A third scheme is called Rostov scoring. It differs from Sochi scoring in that the dump penalties for whisters in case the defenders do not win enough tricks are halved. Moreover, dump points are not used. Instead of losing a dump point, a player pays 5 whist points to each opponent, resulting in the same overall result.

A common condition for ending the game is that each player must have reached a certain target score in pool points. A player who wins more pool points than that target score performs an operation known as American aid. The surplus pool points are transferred to the player with the greatest number of pool points among those who have not yet reached the target score. The receiving player pays for this with ten times as many whist points, i.e. the equivalent amount. If necessary, this procedure is repeated with another player. If this is not possible because all players have reached the target score (and the game is over), the player reduces their dump accordingly to make sure that the pool points can be ignored in the final reckoning.

=== Score sheets and payments ===
Scores are kept on score sheets that have a triangular area designated for each player. Two horizontal lines divide each player's segment of the score sheet into three parts. The top is the dump (sometimes referred to as the mountain), and the last number noted there represents the equivalent (negative) number of dump points. The middle is the pool, and the numbers in this area are used to keep track of the player's pool points. The bottom area is subdivided further. On the left-hand side the player keeps track of the whist points received from the player's left neighbor, and analogously on the right-hand side. If there are four players, the middle corresponds to the player sitting opposite.

When a number in an area of the score sheet changes, the new value is written behind the previous value, separated from it by a period. Older numbers are not crossed out, even when they were in error (in which case the correct number is simply entered after the erroneous one).

A small circle or diamond in the center of the score sheet, where all the players' triangles meet, is used to keep track of general agreements such as the required number of pool points to end the game. When the game is over, each player's score consists of the whist points in the player's whist point area, minus the whist points that other players have written for that player, minus 10 times the number in the player's dump area. An appropriate number is added to each score so that the sum of all scores is 0. The end score indicates how much a player receives or pays in terms of money.

== Misère ==
Misère is a special bid that ranks between 8 with no trumps and 9 at spades, but can be regarded as having a contract value of 10. A player who has made a different bid before cannot bid or declare misère, and a player who has bid misère before cannot bid or declare a different contract. Once a misère contract has been declared, defenders are not asked whether they want to whist. It is played at no trumps, with the defenders' cards face up on the table. The defenders may discuss their options before making a move.

If the declarer does not win a single trick, the declarer receives 10 pool points (×10). Otherwise the declarer loses 10 dump points (×10) each for every overtrick. No further payments take place.

As a variation, there may also be a misère hand (also known as misère without the talon) bid ranking between 9 with no trumps and 10 at spades. In some variations misère hand can be beat by 9 without the talon.

== All-pass ==
The all-pass game (Russian: raspasovka or raspasy) is played when no player has made a bid. The objective is to win as few tricks as possible with no trumps. Each player receives 1 dump point (×10) per trick. A player who does not win any tricks wins 1 pool point (×10). In the Rostov variation players do not receive dump points but 5 whist points per trick are awarded to the winner of all-pass.

There are a number of popular variations that may be agreed to. These involve the talon, the dealer (if there are four players), and escalations in case several all-pass rounds occur in a row.

If there are four players and the dealer is pausing, the talon belongs to the dealer and the dealer (rather than the eldest hand and then the winner of the first trick) leads to the first two tricks: first with the top card of the talon, then the second card. After that, the eldest hand leads to the third trick. A similar arrangement can be followed with three players. In Rostov variation the talon does not belong to the dealer and is not displayed during the all-pas, the dealer receive 1 pool point.

In case of two consecutive all-pass rounds, the second is played at doubled stakes. For further consecutive all-pass rounds, this may either increase by 1 dump point or be doubled each time. (Players may agree on a limit.) All-pass rounds may even be considered consecutive if they are only interrupted by unsuccessful declarations. Moreover, consecutive all-pass rounds may lead to increasing minimum bids, making it progressively harder to leave all-pass mode.

== Irregularities ==
The dealer gets 2 dump points for mis-dealing. Mis-dealing faults are:

- Any card that is turned face up during the deal.
- Players get other than 10 cards each.
- Failure to deal the talon properly. The talon should not be dealt first or last, and should consist of two consecutive cards from the deck. Stricter rules may be used where the talon must be dealt only between dealing rounds, and not after the first or just before the last round.
- Failure to let the player on the dealer's right cut the deck.

These rules were introduced to reduce cheating. When a deal is declared failed, the same dealer should reshuffle the deck, let the player on their right cut it, and deal again.

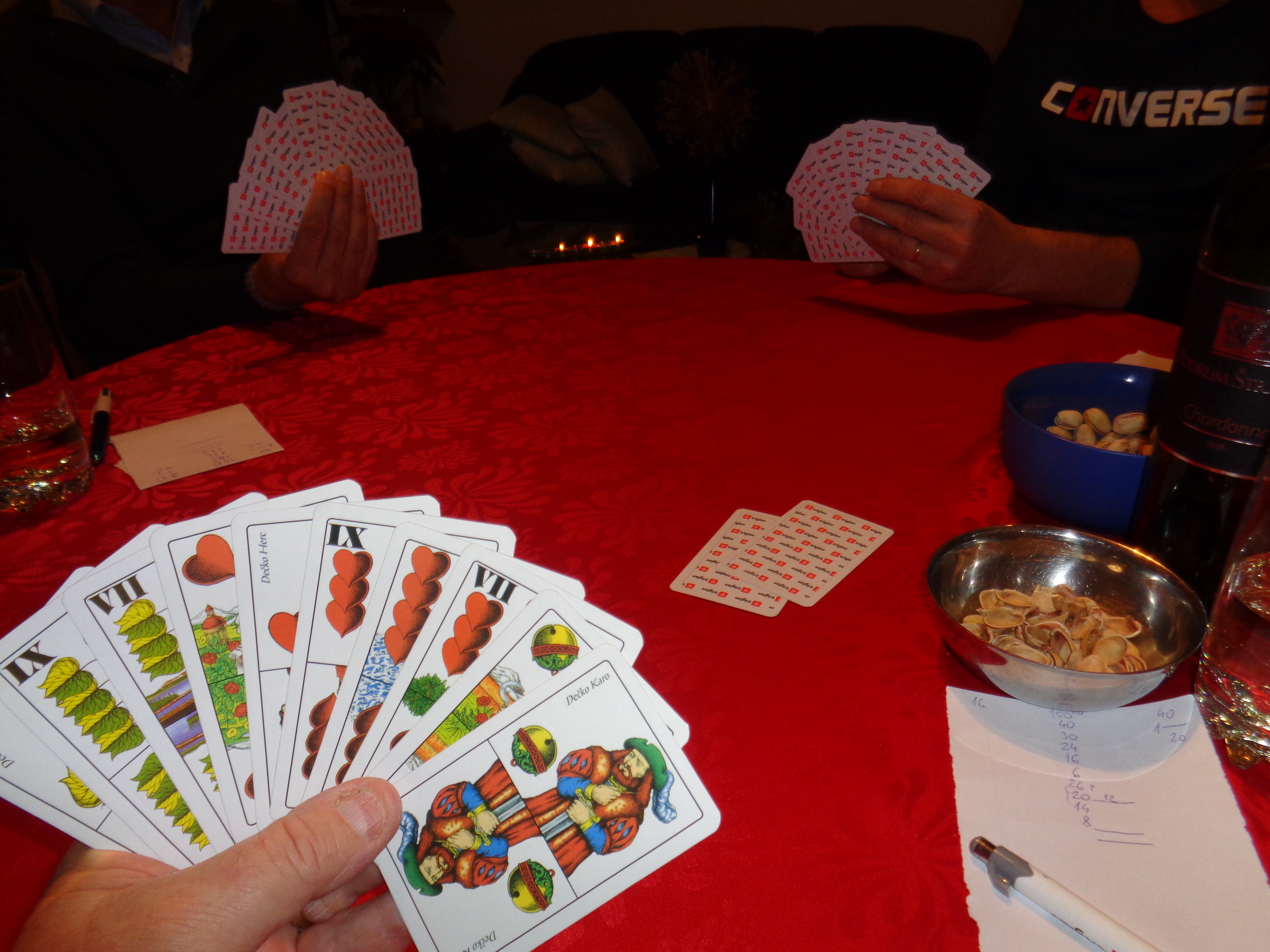
Croatian version of three-player game

== Further variations ==
- Gentlemen's whisting rule: When the declarer does not make their contract, the defenders share their total profit equally.
- The Balkan version is a bit different: bidding begins with the player on the dealer's left and continues clockwise. The suits are ordered low to high: spades - diamonds - hearts - clubs - bettler - no trump (sans) and are called by numbers, respectively, Seconds-Thirds-Fourths-Fifths-Sixths-Sevenths. In the first round of bidding, any player may call for a "game", when he plays using the cards in his hand, without taking the talon cards. In both situations, the lead player MUST take at least 6 tricks to pass, while other players try to take as much as they can, except in a "bettler" game, where the lead player must not take any tricks; bettler is German word for misere.
- This variation is popular when played with Sochi scoring. When a winning bidder names a contract of 6 in spades, both opposing players are required to whist and play their hands closed. This is in reference to the Battle of Stalingrad when the Soviet Army had nowhere to retreat to, being pushed to the banks of Volga river. This variant is sometimes used when a bidder makes an unopposed bid at the beginning, but has the risk of remise and wants the whisters to have a harder time opposing him. Sometimes the players agree to play Six of Spades - Stalingrad even when they're not playing the Sochi, but rather Leningrad or Rostov variants.

In a four-player game, the following rules exist for the dealer. These rules are sometimes seen as archaic and are rarely used.

- A winning bidder may "throw the talon in the face" of a dealer, if he doesn't like it. The talon is left face up on the table until the end of the round. The dealer is awarded 1 dump point.
- In 6-10 trick games, the dealer is awarded the contract value of whists on the winning bidder, per trick, when the following cards appear in the talon:
  - One ace: one trick
  - Ace and king of the same suit: two tricks
  - Two aces: three tricks
  - Marriage (King and Queen of the same suit): one trick
- In a Misère game, the dealer is awarded 10 whist points on the bidder for each 7 in the talon, or 20 whist points for 7 and 8 of the same suit in the talon.
- In all-pass games, see above.

== History ==
The popularity of Préférence appears to have started in Vienna in the early 19th century before it spread to Russia, where it peaked in the middle of the 19th century and is still played today. Besides developing and diversifying within Imperial Russia, and then the Soviet Union, the game also expanded into other countries of Eastern and Central Europe. Modern variations include Austrian Illustrated Préférence and Balkan Préférence, which are both close to the original game, and Greek Prefa, which is more similar to the Russian game. Many of the game's mechanics are based on French Boston, a game that can be roughly characterised as Whist with suit-based bidding.
