= Préférence =

Type of card game originating in Austria

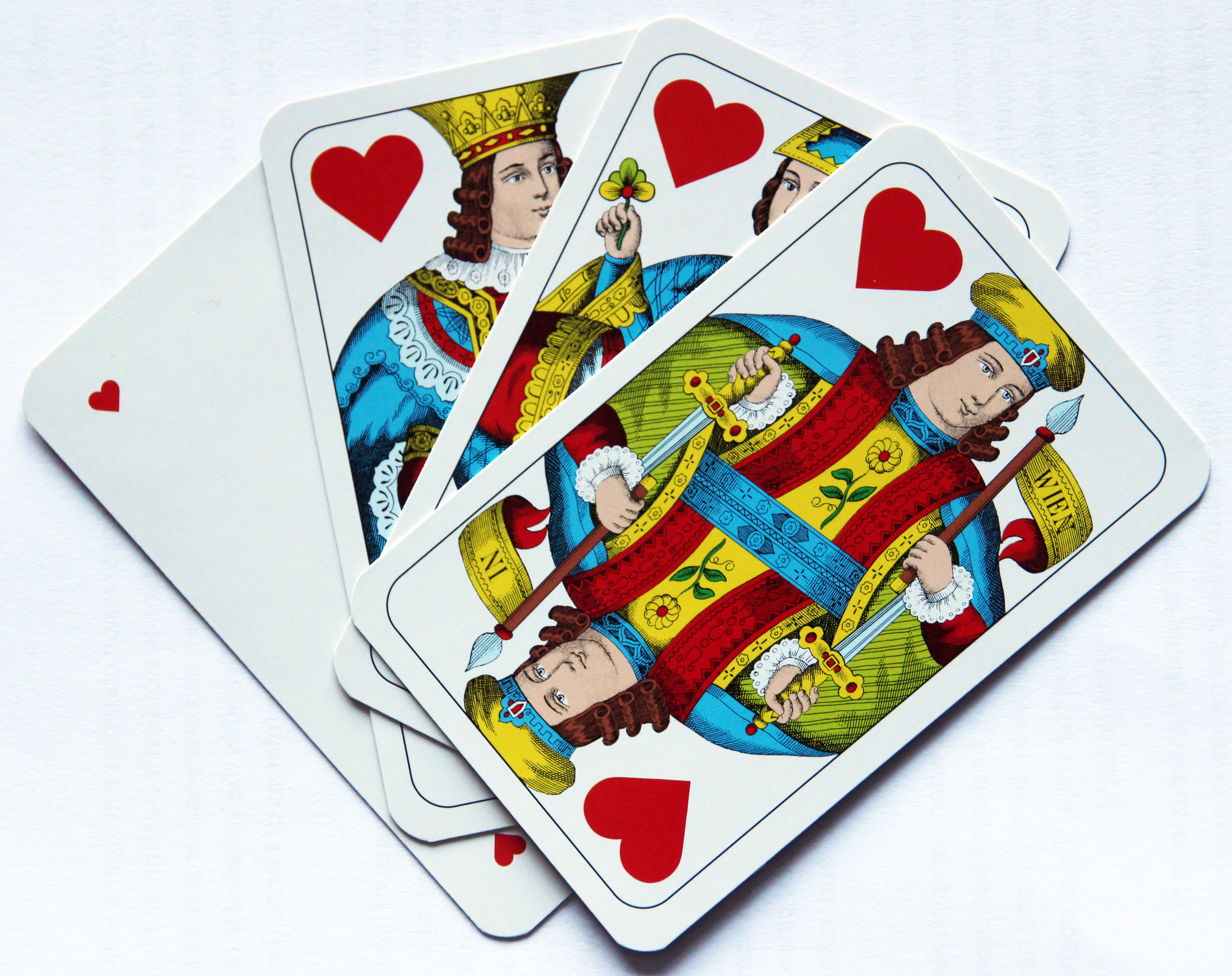
- Highest ranking Hearts in a Preference pack
- Origin: Austria
- Type: Plain-trick
- Family: Rams family
- Players: 3
- Cards: 32
- Deck: French or German (Salzburg) pack
- Rank (high→low): A K O U 10 9 8 7
- Play: Anti-Clockwise

Related games
- Preferans • Bolachen

Préférence, frequently spelt Preference, is a Central and Eastern European 10-card plain-trick game with bidding, played by three players with a 32-card Piquet deck, and probably originating in early 19th century Austria, becoming the second most popular game in Vienna by 1980. It also took off in Russia where it was played by the higher echelons of society, the regional variant known as Preferans being still very popular in that country, while other variants are played from Lithuania to Greece.

== History ==
In spite of the game's French name and a number of French terms, it has always been mostly unknown in France. A game of this name was already mentioned as popular in Vienna in 1803, but Depaulis has found references as early as 1801 in Bohemia and notes that it may even have been known in Russia before 1800. Nevertheless, the earliest known description is in an 1829 Austrian game anthology, Préférence quickly became popular in Imperial Russia as well. Via Yeralash, the suit order of Russian Preferans became the suit order of Bridge whist, before it was changed for a new order, with Spades high like in Contract Bridge. As of 1846, a German encyclopedia listed the games played by the Christian population of the Ottoman Empire (Greeks, Macedonians, Vlachs and Serbs, Slavs) as dice games, chess, backgammon, tarot games, Préférence and gambling card games.

Préférence appears to be derived from Ombre and Boston, although as a three-player game with 10-card hands and a 2-card talon it also has superficial similarities with other Central European games such as Skat and Mariáš. It has the basic structure of Ombre but many similarities with the simpler French four-player game Boston de Fontainebleau, which appears to be the source of the French terminology. McLeod and Geiser group Préférence with the Rams family of card games whose distinctive feature is that players may choose to opt out of a particular deal if they believe their cards are not sufficiently good to win a trick or the minimum specified number of tricks.

Préférence is named after the ranking of preferred suits for bidding purposes, an innovative feature at the time of its introduction. Once a mode of play has been declared, any player may drop out and only the remaining players play, if two parties are still represented. This feature is reminiscent of gambling games such as Tippen or Loo. In Austria, the game is also known as Pudeln, Polackeln or Polacheln, the last two names suggesting a connexion with Poland, Polacken being Austro-Bavarian for "Poles" and similar to the Italian word, polacco. Geiser further states that, in Bavaria, the game is known as Wallachen or Walachen which points to a link with Wallachia in modern-day Romania, however a closer relative appears to be the Bavarian game of Bolachen, whose name is phonetically close to the Austro-Bavarian, Polacheln. Preferl is a light-hearted Viennese nickname for the game.

== Austrian Préférence (1829) ==
The following is a summary of the earliest known (1829) rules for Préference:

Préference is a three-player game. If four play, the dealer, known as King, sits out the hand. In both cases, the role of dealer rotates to the left with each hand. A 32-card Piquet or German-suited pack is used. Cards rank in natural order, aces high: AKQJ10987 or AKOU10987.

=== Deal ===
The dealer shuffles the pack, has the player to the right cut and then deals clockwise, beginning with forehand to the left. The cards are dealt in three packets: first 3, then 4, then 3 more. After the first packet of 3 cards has been dealt, the dealer deals 2 cards to the table, face down, as the talon.

=== Auction ===
There is then an auction in which players may bid to become the declarer who has the privilege of exchanging with the talon, announcing the trump suit and leading to the first trick, committing to take at least 6 tricks. Suits rank in ascending order as follows: Clubs < Spades < Diamonds < Hearts. If German-suited cards are used the order is: Acorns < Leaves < Bells < Hearts.

Forehand opens the bidding and must either "pass" (weiter) or bid by saying "I have one" (ich habe eine). If forehand passes, the next player has the same options. Once a player bids, a later player who also wants to bid, asks "Which suit?" (Wie heißt sie?) and whoever has the lower-ranking suit must pass. An earlier bidder may hold a later bid by saying "mine" (selbst) and play in the higher-ranking suit. If the first player to bid wants to play in Hearts, they simply announce "Préférence", which cannot be overcalled. The winning bidder becomes the declarer and may pick up the talon and lay aside any two cards. Alternatively the declarer may opt to play from the hand without the aid of the talon.

Once the declarer has announced trumps, the others in order must decide whether to play (helfen) or drop out (passen) of the current hand. The latter is indicated by dropping one’s cards or saying "pass". A player who plays on with the declarer must take at least 2 tricks to share the winnings. If all pass first time around, forehand has a second opportunity to play and pick up the talon. Otherwise forehand says "pass again" (abermals weiter), whereupon the dealer must pick up the talon and either play or pass and pay a penalty called a bête (see below).

=== Play ===
Unusually, the declarer leads to the first trick. Players must follow suit if able; otherwise must trump. Only if unable to follow or trump may they discard any other card. There is no requirement to head the trick. The highest trump wins the trick or the highest card of the led suit if no trumps were played. The trick winner leads to the next trick.

=== Settling ===
The game described was played for money, players agreeing the amounts beforehand. In the example given, three players each anted 4 Gulden to a pot from which winnings were drawn. Each trick won was worth 1 kreuzer (kr) in Clubs, 2 in Spades, 3 in Diamonds and 4 in Préference. Settlement was as follows:

- If, after the auction, both defenders dropped out, the declarer won 10, 20, 30 or 40 kr depending on the suit bid. (Note: Presumably he would always name Préference as the suit once the others have dropped out.)
- If the dealer was forced to pick up the talon after everyone had passed, the dealer paid a bête of 10 kr to the pot. (Note: The value of the lowest game i.e. Clubs.)
- If the declarer took at least 6 tricks, he won 10, 20, 30 or 40 kr from the pot depending on the suit played. From these winnings, the declarer paid each successful defender their share. Example, Anton announces Diamonds. He takes 6 tricks, Brigitte 2 and Charlotte 2. Anton draws 30 kr from the pot and pays Brigitte and Charlotte 6 each.
- A defender who failed to take 2 tricks paid the others directly for the tricks they took and the pot remained untouched. Example: Diamonds being trumps, if Anne had taken 7 tricks, Berti 2 and Carl 1, Carl would pay from his own pocket 21 kr to Anne and 6 to Berti.
- A declarer who failed to take 6 tricks paid to the pot what would have been won in a successful game and paid the others for their tricks. Example: Anton names Diamonds as trumps and takes 5 tricks, Brigitte 3 and Charlotte 2. Anton pays 30 kr to the pot, 9 to Brigitte and 6 to Charlotte.
- If a declarer and a defender failed, each placed a bête in the pot and the declarer paid the others for their tricks. Example: Anne announces a Préférence and takes 5 tricks, Berti 4 and Carl 1. Anne and Carl pay 40 kr to the pot and Anne pays Berti 16 kr for his 4 tricks and Carl 4 for his single trick.
- A player who drops out neither pays nor receives payment.

The rules allow a player to play ‘from the hand’ (i.e. without the talon) but do not say how this affects the bid ranking or the game value. (Note: Typically, playing from the hand would double the game value.)

In another early version of the scoring, before every deal, the dealer paid 10 units into the pot. All payments were multiplied by one tenth of the value of the pot at the start of the hand. This could make the game very expensive, especially when played with an unlimited pot as in unlimited gambling games such as Tippen or Loo.

== Austrian Préférence (modern) ==
The rules for modern Austrian Préférence are as follows:

=== Cards ===
Bids and contracts
Bid	Name	Tricks	Trumps (French suits)	Trumps (German suits)
1	clubs	≥6	♣	
2	spades	≥6	♠	
3	diamonds	≥6	♦	
4	hearts	≥6	♥	

While special 32-card, French-suited Préférence packs of the Viennese pattern are available in Austria, in regions such as Salzburg and its surrounding area, Double German cards are preferred.

=== Deal and auction ===
The cards are dealt as in the original rules using the scheme 3–talon–4–3. Players bid for the privilege of becoming the soloist and declaring the trump suit and mode of play. Each bid has a corresponding hand version (i.e. without taking up the talon) that ranks higher than all non-hand bids. A hand bid in hearts is bid as preference; any other hand bid is bid as "hand", with further clarification as necessary. As before, if two players want to play the same suit, positional priority applies. If the others both pass, the dealer becomes declarer.

Except in a hand contract, the declarer takes the talon and discards two cards face down. Declarer then announces trump, whose value must be at least that of the bid. As before, declarer must win 6 tricks, and each defender 2. Before the hand is played, the soloist or any defender may drop out. If one defender drops out, only one defender and the soloist play, so each trick consists of two cards. If both defenders drop out, or the soloist drops out, there is no play and the game is scored immediately.

=== Play ===
Rules of play are as in the 1829 rules above.

=== Stakes and winnings ===
Each player antes a certain amount to the pot before the first deal, and this is repeated whenever the pot is empty later on and players wish to continue.

After the hand has been played, declarer receives 10 units from the pot or pays 20 units into the pot, depending on whether declarer won 6 tricks or not. A defender who did not win two tricks pays 10 units into the pot. In any case, each defender who won at least two tricks receives 1 unit directly from the dealer. A special case is when declarer gave up before the hand was played. In that case declarer pays 3 units to each defender, or 5 units to the remaining defender if the other also dropped out.

== Illustrated Préférence ==
bid	name	tricks	trumps
5	misère	0	none
6	slam	10	none
7	open misère	0	none
8	open slam	10	none

In Illustrated Préférence, also an Austrian game, there are four additional no trumps contracts which again exist in an ordinary version and a hand version each. As a special exception, the non-hand versions of open bids rank higher than non-open hand bids.

In these contracts there are no specific targets for the defenders other than preventing declarer from making it, and no payments for tricks won by defenders. Defenders may not drop out of card-play individually.

If declarer wins a trick in a misère contract, or loses a trick in a slam contract, card-play is stopped immediately. In the open contracts, declarer plays with open cards and defenders may discuss how to proceed.

Scoring for the additional non-suit contracts is fundamentally different from that for suit contracts, as the pot is not touched. The value of a contract is 10 units for misère, 20 units for slam, 30 units for open misère and 40 units for open slam. In contrast to ordinary suit contracts, these values are doubled if the hand version is played. The resulting value is paid by the declarer to each defender, or by each defender to the declarer, depending on whether declarer made it or not.

In another form of Illustrated Préférence, the open contracts do not exist and to win a slam it is sufficient to win 6 consecutive tricks.

== Variations of Austrian Préférence ==
- In un-illustrated Préférence, all payments may be multiplied with the numerical bidding value of the contract.
- According to some rules, players must always play a card that heads the trick, provided this can done while following suit or trumping, as otherwise required.
- According to some rules (especially in German anthologies), a player who cannot follow suit need not trump.
- After one defender has dropped out, the other may invite them. In this case both play, but the invited player has no obligations and no direct interest in the game. All tricks won by either defender player count for the inviting player, who must win at least 4 tricks or pay 1 unit into the pot.
- In addition to the other rules, for a preference game, declarer receives 10 units from each defender if won or pays 10 units to each defender if lost.
- In addition to the other rules, a declarer who played with four aces wins 10 units from each defender if successful, but does not have to pay if not.
- In addition to the other rules, a declarer who has no aces among his or her 12 cards (including the discard) may announce this fact before leading to the first trick. In this case, declarer receives or pays 10 more units from/to each defender, depending on whether declarer makes the contract.

== Hungarian and West Balkans Préférence ==
Bids and contracts
bid	name	tricks	trumps
2	spades	≥6	♠
3	diamonds	≥6	♦
4	hearts	≥6	♥
5	clubs	≥6	♣
6	misère	0	none
7	slam	10	none

The following version of the game is reported from the area of the Former Yugoslavia. Hungarian Preferánsz is very similar.

The cards are dealt following the scheme 5–talon–5. Numerical bids are as shown in the table. There is one corresponding hand contract for each normal contract. If several players bid hand, the highest contract takes precedence as for the non-hand bids.

In hand contracts, the talon is laid aside. Otherwise declarer exposes it to the defenders, then takes up the two cards and discards any 2 cards to get down to a hand of 10 cards. Declarer announces any contract whose value is at least that of the bid.

In ordinary suit contracts, declarer undertakes to win 6 tricks or more, and each defender must win 2 tricks or more. Before the hand is played, the soloist or any defender may drop out. If one defender drops out, only that defender and the soloist play, so each trick consists of two cards only. Alternatively, the remaining defender may invite the other. In this case the other must play normally, but does not take part in scoring. If both defenders drop out, or if the soloist drops out, there is no card-play and the game is scored immediately.

Card-play is as in Austrian Préférence. The soloist leads to the first trick. Players must follow suit if possible, otherwise trump if possible. A trick is won by the player of the highest trump, or by the player who played the highest card of the suit led. The winner of a trick leads to the next trick.

The base value of a contract is its numerical bidding value, or for hand contracts the numerical bidding value plus 1. Declarer receives 20 times the base value from the pot for making the contract or pays the same amount into the pot for not making it.

In suit contracts there are additional payments. Defenders pay 10 times the base value into the pot if they do not win the required number of tricks. If neither defender invited the other, this applies to any defender who did not win at least 2 tricks, and if one defender invited the other and both defenders together did not win at least 4 tricks, it applies to the inviting defender. Moreover, for each trick won by a defender, declarer pays 2 base values to that defender or to the inviting player. The payments for tricks are independent of whether declarer or defenders won their required numbers of tricks.

=== Variations ===
Bids and contracts (variant)
bid	name	tricks	trumps
7	sans atout	≥6	none
8	uno	1	none
9	slam	10	none

- If all players pass in the bidding phase, each player gets a refa marking. The next time a player with a refa marking declares a contract, the base value is doubled. The number of such refa markings per game session is limited.
- After the contract is declared and before declarer leads to the first trick, a defender who speculates that declarer will not make it can announce contra. In this case the other defendant is considered invited (whether he or she dropped out or not), and the defenders must win at least 5 tricks together. A confident declarer may respond with recontra. Contra and recontra each double the base value.
- In the bidding of non-hand contracts, each player in turn must either bid precisely one more than the previous player, bid hand, or pass. A player who has passed may not bid again later. A player who has once made a numerical bid may not make a hand bid later.
- The slam bid 7 may be replaced by a sans atout bid. Alternatively, sans atout and optionally also an uno bid (declarer must win precisely one trick) may be inserted between misère and slam.

=== Danube Swabian Preferánsz ===
For the Danube Swabians, a German-speaking minority in the former Kingdom of Hungary, a variant similar to West Balkans Préférence has been described. In the variant, declarer must win an additional trick if spades are trump, and another additional trick in case of a hand bid. Otherwise the main difference is a simplified scoring scheme and the fact that players cannot drop out.

If the two cards of the talon are of the same rank, declarer pays 2 units to dealer for artwork.

If declarer makes the contract, declarer receives the base value (numerical value of the bid) from each defender; otherwise declarer pays the same amount to each defender. For suite contracts, declarer also receives or pays 1 unit for each overtrick or undertrick.

After the contract is declared and before declarer leads to the first trick, each defender who speculates that declarer will not make the contract may announce contra, to which declarer may respond with recontra. Contra and recontra each double the payments between the two players involved.

== Rules concerning collaboration of defenders ==
In most solo games the defenders have the common goal of preventing the soloist from making it, and the competition between the defenders is momentarily suspended. In Préférence suit contracts, however, the individual targets for defender cause a prisoner's dilemma situation, in which both defenders collectively profit most from cooperating, but a selfish defender might profit even more from strategically breaking this cooperation to win a trick that might have been more advantageously taken by the other defender. The resulting danger of discord is addressed by formalising a number of rules of thumb for cooperative play. These should normally be followed by all defenders – they invited their partner, in which case they are free to try more sophisticated approaches that may break these rules.

- A defender should never unnecessarily win a trick that is already headed by the other defender.
- A defender who leads to a trick in which the declarer comes last should play the highest card of a suit.
- A defender who leads to a trick in which the declarer comes second should lead a very high card (king or ace) or the lowest card in the respective suit.

These rules may have the status of noncommittal advice, or they can be regarded as strong ethical obligations with an understanding that infractions that harm the other defender usually lead to voluntary compensation by side payments. The first rule is sometimes even described as an inherent part of the game rules, so that infractions have the same status as revokes.

== American Preference ==
This unusual and extremely simplified variant of Préférence appeared in Foster's Complete Hoyle starting with the 1909 edition and was also included in the 1922 rules of the United States Playing Card Company (USPCC).

All 32 cards of a Piquet deck are dealt following the scheme 3–talon–4–3, so that each player receives a hand of 10 cards and there remains a widow (or talon) of 2 cards. Starting with eldest hand, each player may bid a desired trump suit or pass. Subsequent players may only bid higher suits. For this purpose suits rank hearts, diamonds, clubs, spades in descending order. The player who names the highest suit becomes declarer and must win 6 of the 10 tricks as a soloist against the two defenders.

If all players pass, there is a second round of bidding in which each player offers a certain amount to pay into the pot for the privilege of becoming the declarer and being allowed to take up the widow and discard 2 cards before announcing the trump suit.

Card play is exactly as in Whist. Aces rank high and tens in their natural position between jacks and nines. Players must follow suit if possible, or else may play any card.

Before the game, players must all deposit a certain amount in the pot and agree on the reward paid from the pot for each trick. This may depend on the trump suit.

With two minor and possibly inadvertent changes that remove the game further from the European games (declarer must discard before taking up the widow, and in the second round of bidding players bid by paying immediately into the pot), these rules are still published on the USPCC website. Although this is not stated in any of the rules, players must also agree on a penalty in case declarer wins less than 6 tricks.

== Other variants ==
In addition to Illustrated Preference and the Eastern European variants covered above, Austrian synonyms or variants listed by Geiser include:

- Old Préférence (Alte Préférence)
- Great Préférence (Große Préférence)
- New Préférence (Neue Préférence)
- Croatian Preference (Kroatische Preference)
- Russian Preference (Russische Preference)
- Styrian Preference (Steirische Preference)
- Trick Preference (Stichpreference)
- Wula Préférence (Wula-Préférence)
- Halbneun or Krebsen
- Hanti (Hanti-Spielen)
- House Préférence (Haus Pudeln)
- Polackeln / Polacheln (Note: May be synonymous with Bavarian Bolachen.)
- Pudeln
- Profasel
- Trick Bidding (Stich-Lizitation)
- Turkish Préférence (Prafa)
- Weli (Weli-Spielen)

In addition, the gambling game of Tippen is also known as Little Preference (Kleinpreference).

== Literature ==
- _ (1829). Neuestes allgemeines Spielbuch. Vienna: C. Haas. pp. 141 ff. Earliest recorded rules.
- Carinthia I.: Mitteilungen des Geschichtsvereins für Kärnten. Vol. 160. Verlag der Geschichtsvereins für Kärnten. 1970.
- Babsch, Fritz (1971). Meister Preference. Vienna: Piatnik. Rule book by the card game manufacturer.
- Babsch, Fritz (1983) Internationale und österreichische Kartenspiel-Regeln, Vienna.
- Bamberger, Johannes [1994]. Die beliebtesten Kartenspiele, Perlen-Reihe Vol. 648, Vienna and Munich: Perlen-Reihe.
- Beck, Fritz [1986?] Preference, Perlen-Reihe Vol. 643, Vienna, Munich and Zurich: Perlen-Reihe.
- Geiser, Remigius (2004). "100 Kartenspiele des Landes Salzburg" (PDF). Talon (13). Archived from the original (PDF) on 27 August 2018.
- Lüftenegger, Peter (2000). Preference: Die schönsten Varianten. Perlen-Reihe. Vol. 643. Vienna: Deuticke. ISBN 3-85223-444-1.
- Wehle, Peter (1980). Sprechen Sie Wienerisch?. Ueberreuter.
