= Herzla =

Card game

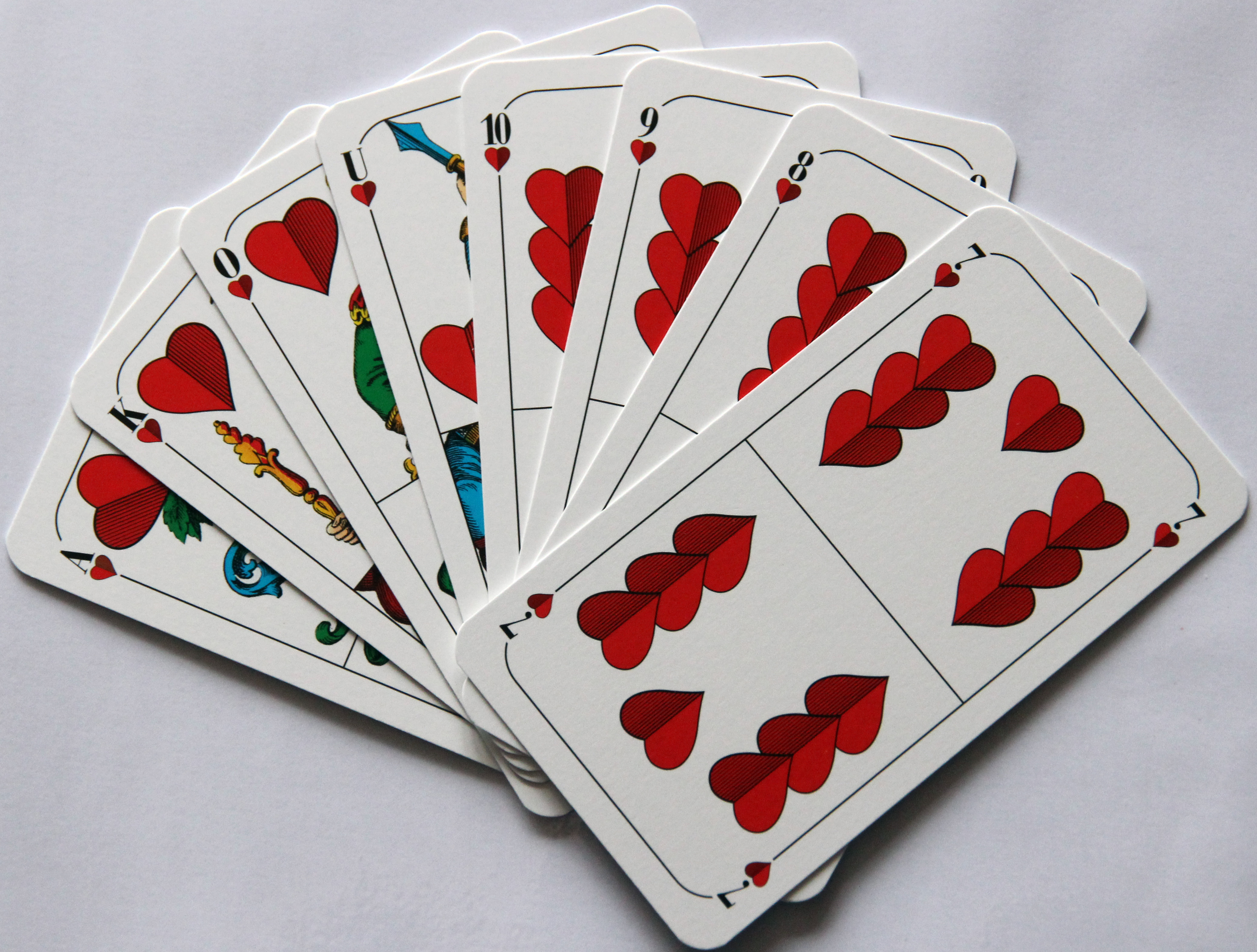
- Suit of Hearts from a Bavarian pack
- Origin: Bavaria, Germany
- Alternative names: Herzl'n
- Type: Trick-taking avoidance
- Family: Hearts family
- Players: 4 (3-8)
- Age range: 6+
- Cards: 32
- Deck: Schafkopf pack
- Rank (high→low): A 10 K Q J 9 8 7
- Play: Clockwise

Herzla or Herzl'n is a Bavarian, reverse trick-taking, card game for 4 players in which the aim is to avoid taking any Hearts. There is a simpler variant for children and adults that may be played by 3-8 players.

== History ==
Herzla is reported as being popular in the Austrian state of Vorarlberg around 1900 and later, alongside 's Dappa, Spitzramsen, Mariaschen, 66 and Lügo. It is still played there today as well as in Bavaria.

== Rules ==
The following rules are based on Sirch (2008).

== Cards ==
A Bavarian pattern pack of 32 cards is used. Typically the Sixes are removed from a Schafkopf pack. Alternatively any German-suited pack may be used. The cards rank in their natural order: Sow (Sau), King, Ober, Unter, Ten, Nine, Eight, Seven.

== Dealing ==
Dealer shuffles the cards and offers to rearhand to cut. Each player is then dealt 8 cards, either in two packets of 4 or four packets of 2 cards. Dealing and play are clockwise.

== Bidding ==
Players may bid for the following contracts:

- Beddl - to take no tricks
- Mord - to take all tricks

If no-one bids for a contract, a normal game is played as described below. If two players bid, positional priority applies. The successful bidder becomes the declarer and plays against the 3 'defenders'.

== Playing ==
Forehand leads to the first trick. There are no trumps. Hearts may not be led to either of the first two tricks. Players must follow suit (Farbzwang), but there is no compulsion to win the trick (i.e. no Stechzwang).

=== Beddl ===
Beddl is Bavarian for Bettel, i.e. a contract in which the declarer undertakes to win no tricks. If they do have to take a trick, the hand ends immediately and the declarer loses. Hearts become irrelevant.

=== Mord ===
Mord literally means "murder", but is the equivalent of a slam or march (Durchmarsch), a contract in which the declarer undertakes to win every trick. As soon as an opponent wins a trick, the hand ends and the declarer loses. Again, who wins which Hearts is irrelevant.

=== Schleichermord ===
A Schleichermord or "sneaky Mord" is when a player decides to play a Mord without announcing it and aims to win all the tricks.

== Scoring ==
In a normal game, players pay 10c for every Heart captured to the player who has avoided taking any. If 2 players are void in Hearts, they each receive 40c. If a player captures all 8 Hearts, they pay 80c to the stock (pot). If a Beddl or Mord is won, the losers pay the declarer 80c each. If the declarer loses, he pays 80c to each opponent. A Schleichermord is worth 80c if won; if it is lost no-one will know anyway!

== Variant ==
A simple variant, suitable for children as well as adults, is to play the normal game. Any number of players from 3 to 8 may play; a Bavarian-pattern Schafkopf pack is used, 36 cards are dealt accordingly and any leftover cards put to one side, face down. Players only play a 'normal game' and score penalty points for each Heart taken. Players may agree to play a set number of rounds and the winner is then the one with the fewest points. Alternatively they may choose to play until the first person reaches an agreed total e.g. 50 points.

== Literature ==
- Sirch, Walter (2008). Vom Alten zum Zwanzger - Bayerische Kartenspiele für Kinder und Erwachsene - neu entdeckt. Bayerischer Trachtenverband.
