= Lokis (film) =

1970 Polish folk horror film

Lokis. Rękopis profesora Wittembacha
- Original Polish release poster
- Directed by: Janusz Majewski
- Screenplay by: Janusz Majewski
- Based on: Lokis. A Manuscript of Professor Wittembach by Prosper Mérimée
- Starring: Józef Duriasz; Edmund Fetting; Gustaw Lutkiewicz; Małgorzata Braunek; Zofia Mrozowska; Hanna Stankówna
- Cinematography: Stefan Matyjaszkiewicz
- Edited by: Lidia Zonn
- Music by: Wojciech Kilar
- Production company: P.P. Film Polski
- Distributed by: Centrala Wynajmu Filmów
- Release date: September 25, 1970 (Poland)
- Running time: 100 minutes
- Country: Poland
- Language: Polish

Lokis (Polish: Lokis. Rękopis profesora Wittembacha, lit. 'Lokis. A Manuscript of Professor Wittembach') is a 1970 Polish folk horror film written and directed by Janusz Majewski, and based on the 1869 Prosper Mérimée horror novel of the same name. "Lokis" is Mérimée's misspelling of the Lithuanian word lokys for "bear".

== Plot ==
In the 19th century Lithuania, Pastor and folklorist Wittembach, who is traveling the remote countryside in an attempt to research and catalog the folk customs of its inhabitants, is invited to stay at the home of a young nobleman named Count Michał Szemiot. After being temporarily delayed when his carriage breaks down, Wittembach arrives at the vast estate the following day. Upon arrival, Wittembach is greeted by the estate's staff, who tell him the Count cannot see him at the present moment, as he is suffering from an unspecified ailment that temporarily suffers spells. Wittembach is quickly befriended by the estate's residing physician Doctor Froeber, who admits to Wittembach that the Count's mother is sequestered in the estate's tower, as she was driven mad after a tragic event.

Settling in for the night, Wittembach discovers a strange man spying on him in a tree outside his window but fails to apprehend the intruder. The next day, Wittembach is greeted by the Count, revealed to be the man who was spying on him. Apologizing for his rude behavior the previous night, Michał offers to help Wittembach in his study of the folk beliefs, giving him access to the rare books housed in his vast library which Wittembach graciously accepts. A little while later, Wittembach meets with Froeber, who confides with Wittembach as to the reason for the Countess' madness; while riding horseback with her now deceased husband, the then-pregnant Countess was brutally attacked by a wild bear. Although the Countess survived the attack, she was driven irredeemably mad by the incident. After giving birth to Michał, she attempted to kill him several times, convinced he was not human. Even though Froeber has attempted to cure the ailing Countess through old-fashioned remedies, he laments that she is incurable.

As Wittembach's time at the estate continues, Michał begins to display odd animal-like behavior that grows worse with each passing day. Wittembach learns from Froeber that the villagers believe Michał to be a Lokis (the local name for bear), the half-human spawn of the bear that attacked his mother all those years ago.

Desperate to retain his own humanity, Michał becomes engaged to Julia Dowgiałło, a beautiful young woman who has been vying for his affection. The wedding, officiated by Wittembach at Michał's request, is plagued by several ill omens which are brushed off by onlookers. The following morning, when Michał and his new bride do not answer the servant's call, the increasingly worried staff and Wittembach break down the door to their bed chambers. Once inside they find Julia's corpse, her throat brutally ripped out, and Michał is nowhere to be seen. Tracks supposedly from Michał are soon found in the snow outside the bedroom window, which appear to change shape as they disappear into the nearby woods.

Sometime later, as Wittembach and Froeber prepare to leave at a nearby train station, they contemplate what really happened to Michał, theorizing that he accidentally killed Julia in a fit of passion before panicking and fleeing the estate. While boarding the train, the two encounter a group of hunters who have returned after a successful hunt with an assortment of wild animals. One animal in particular catches Wittembach's attention, a large bear whose muzzle is covered in blood. As the train departs, Wittembach asks for God to have mercy on Michał's soul, whom he believes to be trapped in the body of the bear.

== Cast ==
- Józef Duriasz as Count Michał Szemiot
- Edmund Fetting as Pastor Wittembach
- Gustaw Lutkiewicz as Doctor Froeber
- Małgorzata Braunek as Julia Dowgiałło
- Zofia Mrozowska as Countess Szemiot, mother of Michał
- Hanna Stankówna as Governess Pamela Leemon

== Production ==
Lokis was written and directed by Janusz Majewski. The film itself is based on the Prosper Mérimée's 1869 novella of the same name.

== Release ==
=== Home media ===
Lokis was first released on DVD in 2005 by Propaganda Studios, in a deluxe booklet box, with a short video documenting its digital restoration. A reissue followed later, in a regular DVD jewel case. The film was also included in Propaganda's DVD box set Czarna seria (The Black Series) of 10 digitally restored Polish films.

In 2015, Telewizja Kino Polska released Lokis as part of a 3-DVD box set Przeboje polskiego kina: horrory (Masterpieces of Polish Cinema: Horrors), which also included Wilczyca (1982) and Widziadło (1983), with English subtitles.

Lokis was subsequently released on Blu-ray in North America in December 2021 as part of the All the Haunts Be Ours: A Compendium of Folk Horror set by Severin Films.

In 2022, a restored high-definition version of Lokis was made available to view for free on the streaming video platform 35 mm online, as part of a larger project of restoration and digitization of Polish feature, documentary and animated films, spearheaded by the Polish Film Institute, the Documentary and Feature Film Studios, and by Studio Filmów Rysunkowych, and co-financed by the European Regional Development Fund.

== Reception ==
=== Modern ===
Stephen Thrower on the website Movies and Mania commended the film's atmosphere, characterizations, cinematography, and visuals. However, Thrower criticized film's overall restraint in regards to the horror aspects of Mérimée's original story. Adam Groves of Fright.com offered the film similar criticism, calling it "a well made though somewhat monotonous work of atmospheric horror." Dave Sindelar from Fantastic Movie Musings and Ramblings gave the film a mostly positive review, comparing it favorably to the works of Val Lewton, while noting the film's runtime and slow pacing.

=== Awards ===
In 1971, Lokis earned for Majewski the "Best feature film director ex-aequo" award at the 14th International Festival of Science Fiction and Horror Films, Sitges, Spain, as well as Polish film awards.

== Bibliography ==
- Haltof, Marek (February 2, 2015). Historical Dictionary of Polish Cinema. Rowman & Littlefield. ISBN 978-1-4422-4472-6.
- Hardy, Phil (1996). Horror. Aurum Film Encyclopedia. Vol. 3. Aurum. ISBN 978-1-8541-0384-0.
- Klimaszewski, Bolesław (January 1, 1983). An Outline History of Polish Culture. Interpress. ISBN 978-8-3223-2036-5.
- Slater, Thomas (November 30, 1991). Handbook of Soviet and East European Films and Filmmakers. Greenwood Publishing Group. ISBN 978-0-3132-6239-5.
