= Lithuanian National Opera and Ballet Theatre =

Theatre in Vilnius, Lithuania

- Lietuvos nacionalinis operos ir baleto teatras

- National Opera and Ballet Theatre building in 2022
- Interactive map of Lithuanian National Opera and Ballet Theatre
- Address: A. Vienuolio g. 1 Vilnius; Lithuania
- Coordinates: 54°41′21″N 25°16′41″E
- Capacity: 984 seats

Construction
- Opened: 31 December 1920; 105 years ago
- Years active: 1920–present
- Architect: Elena Nijolė Bučiūtė

Lithuanian National Opera and Ballet Theatre (LNOBT) (Lithuanian: Lietuvos nacionalinis operos ir baleto teatras), founded as Operos vaidykla, is an opera house and ballet theatre in Vilnius, Lithuania.

== History ==
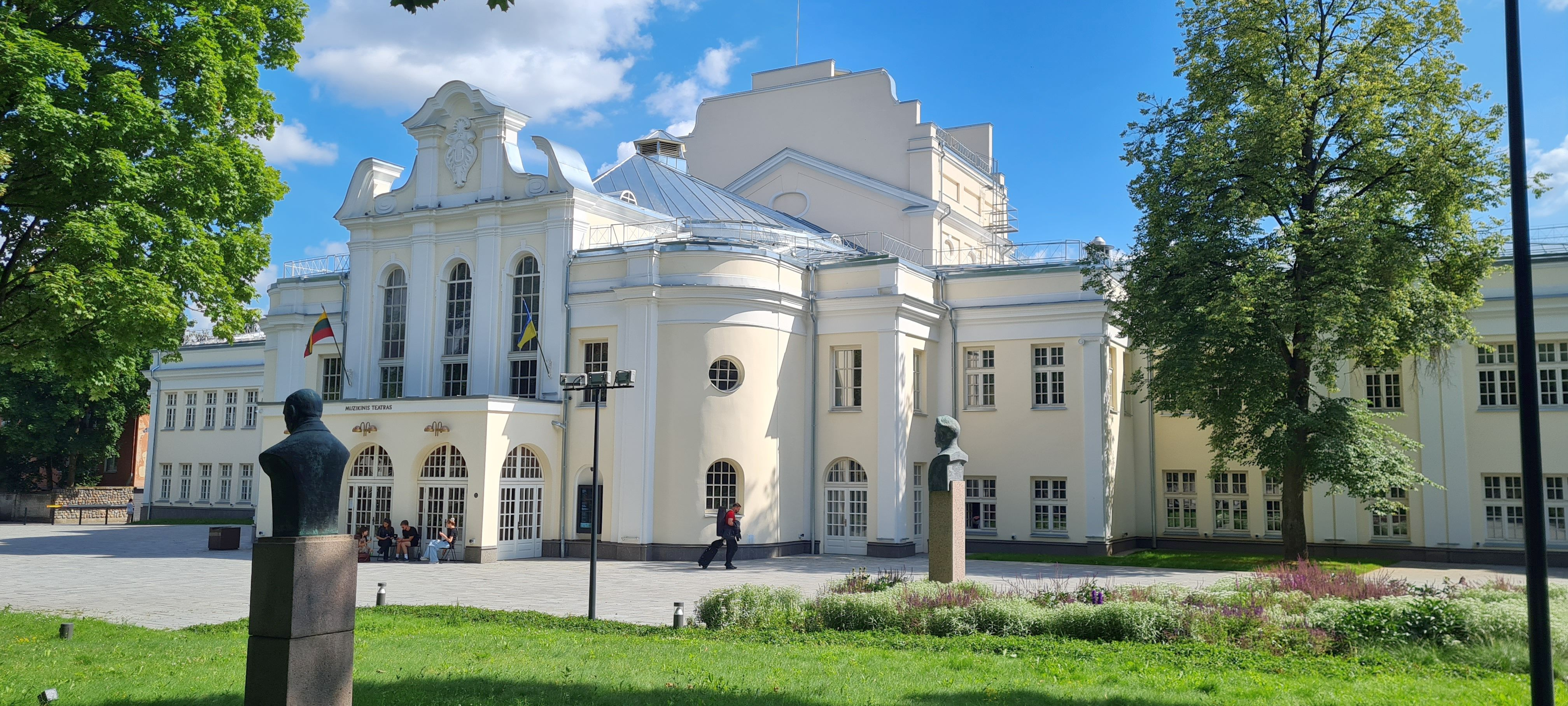
Kaunas State Musical Theatre, original home of LNOBT

Operos vaidykla was founded in 1920 by the Society of Lithuanian Creators of Art in the temporary capital of Kaunas, in the building now known as the Kaunas State Musical Theatre (opened in 1892). The premiere, Verdi's La Traviata, was performed on 31 December of that year, which is now regarded as the anniversary of the theatre.

The first ballet, Léo Delibes' Coppélia, was performed on 4 December 1925.

Many artists of the theatre moved to the west during World War II before the second Soviet occupation in 1944. In 1948, the Opera and Ballet Theatre moved from Kaunas into an existing theatre building on J. Basanavičiaus Street in Vilnius.

The theatre moved to a brand new building on the banks of the Neris River in 1974, designed by architect Elena Nijolė Bučiūtė (born 1930), after she had won an architectural competition in 1960.

On 1 July 1998, the theatre was declared a national institution, and was officially renamed the Lithuanian National Opera and Ballet Theatre.

A major renovation of the theatre has been undertaken, announced in 2022 with scheduled completion date before the beginning of the 2023/2024 theatre season. It has been costed at around 10m euros. The stage had been modernised since 1974, but services needed upgrading, so the new renovations included roof refurbishment and insulation; replacement of the glass of the external facade as well as windows and skylights; modernisation of the heating and hot water systems; and upgrading the ventilation and lighting systems. The changes reduce the energy consumption of the building by up to 45%.

== Location and description ==
The theatre is located at A. Vienuolio g. 1, in the Old Town.

As of 2024, Ms. Laima Vilimienė is the general manager of the theatre.

== Performances ==
Apart from standard Western repertory works, the opera also performs national operas. Vytautas Klova's opera Pilėnai (1956), has since 2001 been performed outdoors during the summer at Trakai Island Castle.

Bronius Kutavičius' opera Lokys (2000), after Prosper Mérimée's short story Lokis the bear, was commissioned by the Vilnius Festival. The ballet has performed several productions by Russian choreographer Boris Eifman, among them Red Giselle.

Facade of the building

== See also ==
- Lithuanian opera
- List of opera houses
