= Aušra Marija Sluckaitė-Jurašienė =

Lithuanian writer (born 1936)

Aušra Marija Sluckaitė-Jurašienė (born June 1, 1936) is a Lithuanian writer, literary critic, and journalist.

== Career ==
In 1958, she graduated from Vilnius University. From 1959 to 1970, she worked at the Vaga publishing house. From 1970 to 1974, she headed the literary department of the Vilnius State Youth Theatre. In 1974, she emigrated to the West together with her husband, theater director Jonas Jurašas. They lived in Germany, Austria, United States. As of 2021 they lived in Florida. From 1975 to 1984, she worked at the Radio Free Europe.

During the 2018 Bronis Savukynas Award ceremony Minister of Culture said in part:

"Aušra Marija Sluckaitė-Jurašienė is an example of civil behavior for us, how it was possible to remain dignified, oppose the system and maintain a straight civil backbone in Lithuania's darkest times. At the same time, she allowed us to better understand and get to know the artist's well-being, the search for her place in another culture and society".

== Awards ==
- 2018: Bronys Savukynas Award from the Lithuanian Ministry of Culture, for the book of intellectual essays Spektaklų ir sapnų klavyrai ("Pianos of Performances and Dreams").
- 2016: Honorary badge of the Ministry of Culture "Nešk savo šviesą ir tikėk" ("Carry your light and believe")
