= Dreeg =

Card game

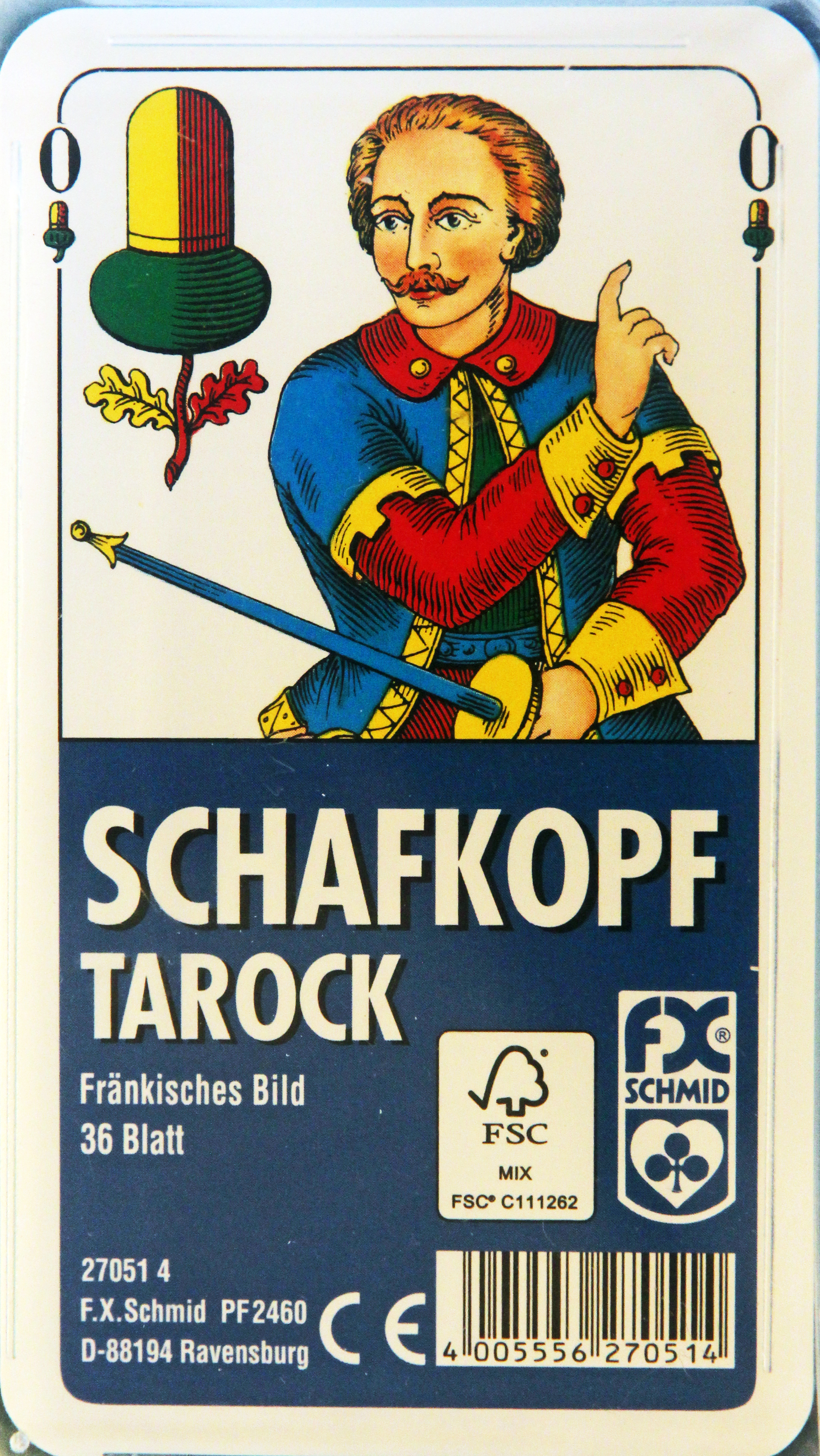
- Franconian-pattern pack
- Origin: Germany
- Alternative names: Nuremberg Dreeg, Nürnberger Dreck, Nämbercher Dreeg
- Type: Compendium game
- Players: 3 or 4
- Age range: 12+
- Cards: 24
- Deck: Franconian-pattern pack
- Rank (high→low): A K O U 10 9
- Play: Clockwise
- Playing time: 40 minutes

Related games
- Barbu • Herzeln • Kein Stich • Lorum • Quodlibet • Rosbiratschka
- 4 deals x 2 rounds = 8 games

Dreeg, Nuremberg Dreck or Nuremberg Dreeg (German: Nürnberger Dreck, Nämbercher Dreeg or Dreeg) is a card game that is described as "a special Franconian form of Sixty-Six with the wonderful name of Nuremberg Dreck." It is the most common variant of Sixty-Six in the Franconian region of Bavaria, Germany. It is a compendium game based on four variations of Sixty-Six and is usually played by four players, although three may also play.

== History, distribution and name ==
The rules of the game were published in 1981 by Weickmann and, more recently, in 2012 by Bamberger, but Scherm recalls playing it in the late 1950s and early 1960s with his friends by the fishpond of the Würzburger Fischhäusla in Fürth, Bavaria. The game is very popular in Franconia. Tournaments are held in Neustadt an der Aisch and at Simonshofen near Lauf an der Pegnitz.

The game is variously known as Dreeg, (Note: The name Dreeg is Franconian dialect for Dreck i.e. "mud, muck, dirt or grime".) Nürnberger Dreck or Nämbercher Dreeg.

== Cards ==
The game is traditionally played with a pack of 24 Franconian-pattern, German-suited cards comprising, in ascending order: Nine, Unter, Ober, King, Ten and Ace (Sow). The four suits are Acorns, Leaves, Hearts and Bells.

== Rules ==
There are typically four different sub-games within each game round that are played nauf und noo, i.e. first in the normal order, then in reverse. They are intended to represent games from Germany, Russia, England and Africa, (Note: The initial letters of these countries in German spell out the work D-R-E-K which is roughly how the name of the game is pronounced.) respectively, although Cameroon is probably of German origin. The following rules are based on Bamberger (2012) except where stated:

=== Contracts ===
There are four contract or sub-games, which are played first in the order listed and then in the reverse order, to produce a game with two rounds of four sub-games each.

1. Sixty-Six (Sechsundsechzig): After shuffling and cutting, each player is dealt 6 cards (3 + 3) and the dealer reveals the bottom card of the pack for trump. Thus the dealer automatically gains a trump. Players must follow suit, trump and overtrump if possible.
2. Ace of Hearts (Herz Ass) or Red Sow (Rot-Sau): Played as for Sixty-Six above but, after dealing, the player with the Red Sow (i.e. Ace of Hearts) chooses trumps. The other 2 or 3 players then form a team and play together as 'defenders' against the player who declared the trump suit. Players do not 'go out' on reaching 66, but play to the end. The player with the Red Sow may pass if his hand is too poor, conceding 2 points to each other player. If he scores over 66 card points, he earns 3 game points; if over 33 but under 66; he gets nothing and all the others get 1 game point each.
3. Call A Card (Rufen): After receiving the first three cards, forehand deal must, after viewing them, call another card, the 'called card' (Ruf) to form a team with the player who holds that card, who must play it to the first trick; forehand must therefore have, and lead with, a trump. At the same time this determines the trump suit. The other two players also form a team. If the caller calls himself, he plays solo against the other three. If three play, the 3rd player has to play solo against the caller and called player. Players can 'go out' on reaching 66.
4. Cameroon (Kamerun): This is a Ramsch where everyone plays for himself, the aim being to win the fewest card points. No trumps. Suit must be followed and players must head the trick if possible. Only if unable to do either may they play a card of a different suit (as high as possible). Card points are totted up and the player with the fewest earns 3 game points; the next player, two, and the third, one. A player with a strong hand may announce a 'march' (Durchmarsch), a bid to win all six tricks and 3 game points. If he loses, the others get 3 each.

=== Scoring ===
Each player starts each sub-game with 7 points recorded as a Roman numeral XII chalked up on a slate for each player. As players score points the strokes (Striche) are erased: first the middle of the X is erased, leaving 6 strokes; then each of the arms of the X, followed by the two Is. At the end of each deal, the player with the most card points scores 3 game points and erases 3 strokes (or e.g. the centre of the cross plus 2 arms); the player who came second earns 2 game points; the third player 1 game point and the fourth, none.

=== Going out ===
When a player reaches 7 points he has won and sits out while the rest continue. When certain sub-games are down to two players, minor changes are required to the rules as follows:

- Sixty-Six: Played as above, but using the talon (Haifler i.e. Häufchen). The bottom card of the talon determines trumps and is placed under the talon, half-visible; it may be 'robbed' with the trump 9. As in normal Sixty-Six, players may play any card until the talon is exhausted. When three are left, their aim continues to be to win the most card points, the winner erasing 2 strokes and the 2nd player, one. With two players left, a win scores 1 game point.
- Red Sow: If a player has the red Sow, he need not announce trumps immediately, but must play it (and specify trumps) no later than the third trick. If no player has the red Ace, they play without trumps until one of them draws it from the Haifler. If it does not surface after the first 3 tricks, the Haifler is turned over so everyone can see the next card to be drawn.
- Call A Card: When two are left, the non-dealer calls trumps after receiving the first 3 cards.

=== Winning ===
In each sub-game, when three players have reached 7 points, the remaining player is the loser and receives a 'blob' (Bolln) by his name on the slate. In some cases e.g. Cameroon there may be more than one loser. The overall game winner is the player (or players) with the fewest blobs.

In a Neustadt variant, the winner of each game receives a blob and the first to seven is the overall winner. But they acknowledge that sometimes the aim is to win the fewest blobs.

== Variants ==
Scherm names other contracts - Farbensammeln ("Suit Collecting"), Grünassen ("Green Ace") and Dreck ("mud", "dirt") - alongside the usual Rotassen ("Red Ace") and Sechsundsechzig ("Sixty-Six"), but does not describe them.

Schamberger mentions a version comprising Sechsersechzg (66), Roud-Assn ("Red Ace"), Beddl (Bettel) and Farbensammeln ("Suit Collecting").

== Literature ==
- Bamberger, Johannes (2012). Schnapsen: die schönsten Varianten. Perlen-Reihe. Vol. 639 (13th ed.). Vienna: Verlag Perlen-Reihe. ISBN 978-3-99006-003-2.
- Brater, Jürgen (2005). Generation Käfer : unsere besten Jahre. Frankfurt am Main: Eichborn. ISBN 978-3-82185-607-0.
- Schamberger, Klaus (2022). Wie ich einmal nicht der Morlock geworden bin. Cadolzburg: ars vivendi. ISBN 978-3-7472-0438-2
- Scherm, Gerd (2003). Hoffen kostet nichts Erzählungen. Colmberg: BoD. ISBN 9783831144785.
- Weickmann, Rudolf J. (1981). Die Kartl-Akademie Weinzierlein einzig amtl. Lehrbuch für "66" u. "Närmberger Dreeg". Nuremberg: Verlag Albert Hofmann. ISBN 3-87191-063-5.
