= King (card game) =

Card game similar to Bridge

- The card to avoid in No King of Hearts
- Origin: unknown
- Type: Compendium game
- Players: 3 or 4
- Skills: Card counting, Tactics
- Cards: 36 or 32
- Deck: Russian-pattern, French-suited pack
- Rank (high→low): A K Q J 10 9 8 7 (6)
- Play: Clockwise
- Chance: Low — Moderate

Related games
- Barbu • Herzeln • Kein Stich • Lorum • Quodlibet • Rosbiratschka
- Features: 6 deals x 2 rounds = 12 games

King is a Russian compendium card game of the Hearts family for 3 or 4 players that goes back to the 1920s. It may be related to Barbu, but its country of origin is unknown.

== Rules ==
=== Three players ===
King is played by three players with 36 Russian-pattern, French-suited playing cards ranking in their natural order, Aces high. Deal and play are assumed clockwise and each player receives 12 cards. Eldest hand leads and players must follow suit if able; failing that they may play any card.

There are two rounds of six contracts. The first is a round of negative games as follows:

1. No Tricks. Each trick taken incurs 6 penalty points.
2. No Hearts. Each heart taken is worth 8 penalty points. Hearts may not be led unless there is no choice.
3. No Men. Each King and Jack incurs 9 penalty points.
4. No Queens. Each Queen costs 18 penalty points.
5. No Last Two Tricks. Taking either of the last two tricks is worth 36 penalty points.
6. No King of Hearts. ♥K is worth 72 penalty points. Hearts may not be led unless there is no choice. ♥K must be played if unable to follow suit.

The second round is identical, except that all the games are now positive – Tricks, Hearts, Men, etc., and score plus points instead.

=== Four players ===
A version of King for four players is played with 32-card deck, each player receives 8 cards. There are two rounds of six contracts. The first is a round of negative games as follows:

1. No Tricks. Each trick taken incurs 2 penalty points.
2. No Hearts. Each heart taken is worth 2 penalty points. Hearts may not be led unless there is no choice.
3. No Men. Each King and Jack incurs 2 penalty points.
4. No Queens. Each Queen costs 4 penalty points.
5. No Last Two Tricks. Taking either of the last two tricks is worth 8 penalty points.
6. No King of Hearts. ♥K is worth 16 penalty points. Hearts may not be led unless there is no choice. ♥K must be played if unable to follow suit.

The second round is identical, except that all the games are now positive – Tricks, Hearts, Men, etc., and score plus points instead.

== Jeu du Roi ==
There appears to be a French version, Jeu du Roi played between four players using a standard 52-card pack.

== Bibliography ==
- Parlett, David (2008). The Penguin Book of Card Games. London: Penguin. ISBN 978-0-141-03787-5.
