= Davoserjazz =

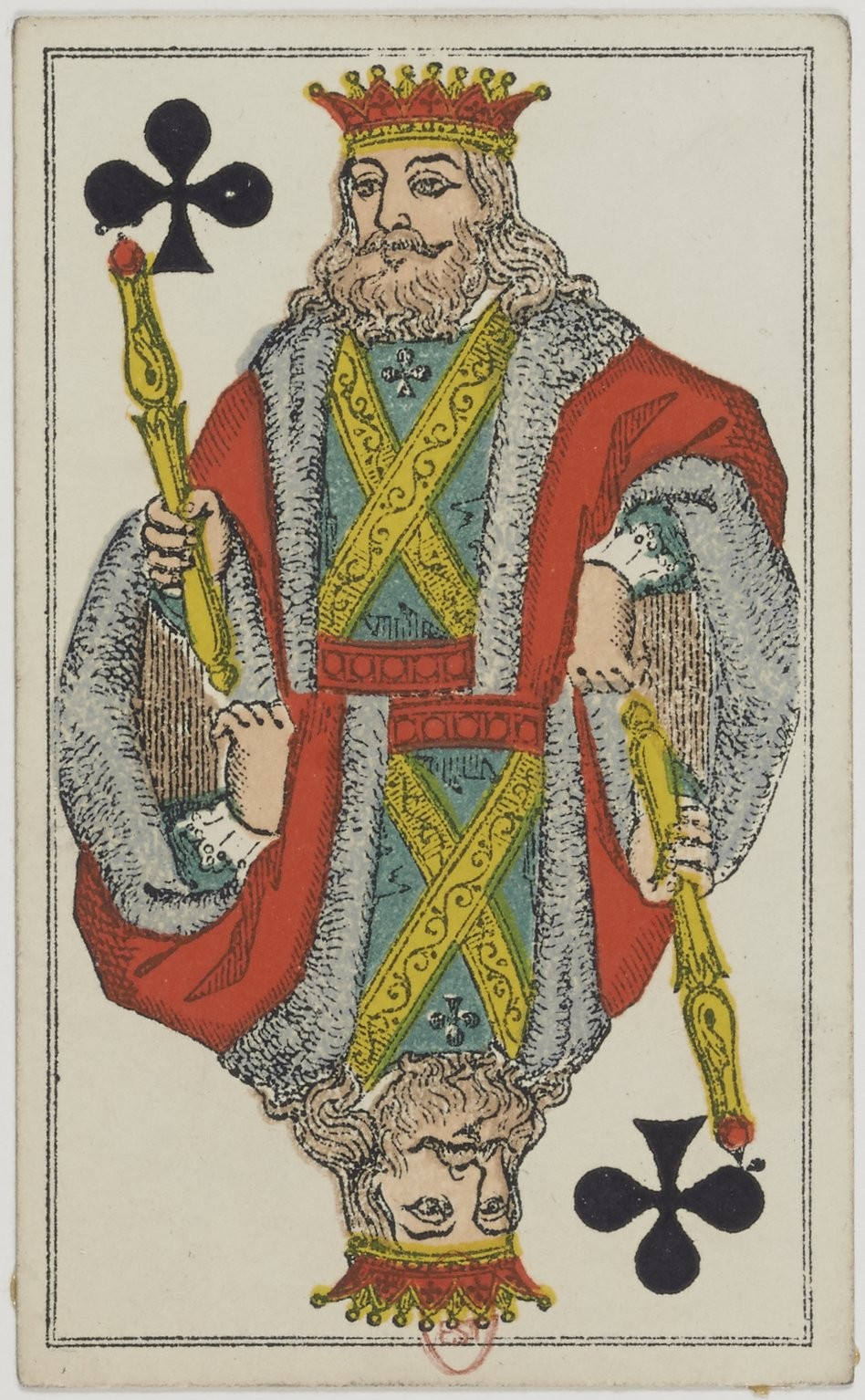
- The card to avoid in No King of Clubs
- Origin: Denmark
- Alternative names: Davoserjas, Davoserjass and Davoserjaz
- Type: Compendium game
- Players: 3-7
- Cards: 52
- Deck: French pack
- Rank (high→low): A K Q J 10 9 8 7 6 5 4 3 2
- Play: Clockwise
- Playing time: 25 minutes

Related games
- Barbu • Lorum • Herzeln
- 6 deals x 1 round = 6 games

Davoserjazz is a simple, Danish compendium game using playing cards for three to seven people. It comprises 6 subgames, the first five of which are reverse games and the last one is a shedding game. Its name is also spelt Davoserjas, Davoserjass and Davoserjaz and means "Davos Jass" although it has no connection with the Swiss resort of Davos nor with the Swiss card game genre of Jass.

Davoserjazz is played in many variations, and both the number of rounds and which cards are penalty cards in reverse games can vary.

== Rules ==
The rules described are based on Dedichen (1971) and Schenkmanis (1999) which, however, vary slightly.

=== Players and cards ===
Davoserjazz is for three to seven people using a standard 52-card French-suited pack. With three, five, six and seven players, one or more cards are removed, so that each player receives the same number of cards. The cards removed are in order: ♦2 ♥2 ♠2 ♣2.

The cards rank is from high to low: A,K,Q,J,10,9,8,7,6,5,4,3,2. Aces are high, except in the last subgame, Cabale.

=== Subgames ===
There are six deals in Davoserjazz, each one comprising a subgame with a specific aim. In the first five, the object is to avoid getting points (penalty points). The subgames are:

1. No Tricks (Færrest stik). This is a reverse game in which the aim is to make as few tricks as possible. At the end of the deal, players incur a number of points equal to the number of tricks they took.
2. No Clubs (Færrest klør). The object is to take as few clubs as possible in tricks. At the end of the deal, each player counts their club cards, each one incurring a point.
3. No Queens (Færrest damer). The object is to avoid taking Queens in tricks. At the end of the deal, each Queen captured in tricks scores five points.
4. No King of Clubs (Klør konge). The object is to avoid taking the ♣K. The player who captures the King scores fifteen points.
5. No Last Trick (Sidste stik). The aim is to avoid taking the last trick. The player who does this scores twenty penalty points. In Schenkmanis, the aim is to avoid both the first and last tricks, each of which scores ten points.
6. Cabale (Kabalen). Here the game is completely different. The cards must be laid out on the table with the 7 of each suit in the middle and the cards ranking below 7 in order in a pile on one side and the cards ranking above 7 in a pile on the other side. (Note: Presumably the cards must be laid on the pile in sequential order i.e. 6, 5, 4, 3, 2, A on one side and 8, 9, 10, J, Q, K on the other.) If you cannot place a card according to these rules, you must pass, which costs a penalty point. The winner of the whole game is the one who goes out first.

=== Scoring ===
There are different scoring systems: either the winner collects the entire pool of points or they are distributed according to an appropriate tariff.

1. Cabale is the decider. If there are 3 to 5 players, 2/3 of the total pool goes to the winner and 1/3 to the runner-up. If there are 6 or 7 players, 1/2 the pool goes to the winner, 1/3 to the runner-up and 1/6 to the third-placed player.
2. Cabale is just another subgame in which the winner gets no points and the others get as many points as they have cards left in their hand. These are added to the points from the other subgames, and the overall winner is the one with the fewest points.

== Bibliography ==
- Dedichen, Herman, ed. (1971). Spillefuglen (10. ed.). Politikens Forlag. pp. 127–129.
- Schenkmanis, Ingalil og Ulf (1999). Bogen om kortspil (2. ed.). Aschehoug. pp. 97–98.
