= Trex (card game) =

Card game

Trex, pronounced Tricks or Trix, and also known as Ticks, is a four-player Middle Eastern card game mainly played in the Levant region (Jordan, Syria, Lebanon and Palestine). Similar to European games like Barbu, Herzeln, Kein Stich or Quodlibet, Trex is a compendium game in which there are four rounds with each round consisting of five games. Each cycle is called a "kingdom" in reference to the fact that in each cycle one player (the King) determines which contract to play in each of the five games.

== Players, cards and deal ==
Trex is played by four people using a standard international 52-card pack without jokers. The cards in each suit rank from high to low: A-K-Q-J-10-9-8-7-6-5-4-3-2. Deal and play are counter-clockwise.

To begin the session, the cards are shuffled, cut (by player to left of dealer) and dealt out to the four players, one at a time, so that each player has 13 cards. It does not matter who deals first, but the player who is dealt the 7 of hearts in this first deal is said to "own the kingdom." This player chooses which contract to be played each hand, and is also the dealer for the next four deals. During his or her "kingdom" a player may choose to play any contract based on his or her cards. There is no rule for playing the contracts in a set order, and there are 120 possible combinations of contract orders.

After the first dealer has played all five contracts, the kingdom passes to the player to his right, and so on. In some variations the game passes to the right first two times, then to the person opposite of the second player then to the remaining player. Each of these players, during their kingdoms, must deal five times, choosing a different contract each time, without repetition. After the four kingdoms are complete, 20 deals have been played, every player has chosen every contract once: the game is over.

== The five contracts ==
Four of the five contracts are trick-taking games in which the aim is to avoid taking tricks, or particular cards. The dealer always leads to the first trick, and the winner of each trick leads to the next. Players must follow suit if they can, and the highest card of the suit led collects the trick.

=== King of hearts or "roi de coeurs" ===
The player who takes the trick containing the king of hearts loses 75 points in standard setting. When the contract is announced, the player who has the king of hearts has the option of revealing it to the other players and in doing so doubling its value. Hence, this process is called "doubling". If the player doubling the card fails, and collects it, he or she is reduced 75 points. Oppositely, If another player collects it when it is "doubled" he or she is reduced 150 points (double the standard value) and the player who originally had it gets 75 points.

One common strategy followed in the pursuit of forcing the card's holder to collect it him or herself is for players to purposely lead hearts when possible.

If this contract is chosen and a player holds either the king of hearts alone, the ace of hearts alone, or the king of hearts and the Ace of hearts, he or she may request that the hand be re-dealt. This is because such a player would most probably collect the card, which would be unfair for him or her! The player making the appeal should show all his or her cards to the other players. If this happens the replayed contract does not have to be King of Hearts.

=== Diamonds ===
Each card of the diamond suit taken in a trick costs 10 points off the running total of the collecting player. In some variations the collected diamonds are kept face up in front of the players taking them so that everyone can see which diamonds have been taken, and/or played, although this is not the standard method of play. Normally they are not shown.

=== Girls or "femmes" ===
Each queen taken in a trick costs the collecting player 25 points. Queens are stored face up in front of the winner of the trick in which they were played. Queens can also be doubled, causing the player who collects a doubled queen to be reduced 50 points and the one giving it to gain 25 points. If a doubled queen is collected it has a card placed over its half. Among some Trex players this is called "a blanket to keep her warm". If a normal queen is collected it has a card placed under its half. This is called "a pillow for her head".

=== Collections/ "slaps"/"slapping"/"lutoosh" ===
Each trick taken costs the collecting player 15 points.

=== Trex or trix ===
Despite its name, this is the only contract that is not a trick-taking game, but a game of the Card Domino family. Players try to get rid of their cards as soon as they can by playing them to a layout, which begins with the jacks, and continues upwards in each suit to the ace and downwards to the two. The dealer begins and play continues counter-clockwise. Players must play one card if they can. Legal plays are: any jack, or any card that is one rank higher or lower than a card that has already been played. If a player is unable to play, they pass. The first player who runs out of cards scores plus 200 points. The others continue playing and the second scores plus 150 points, the third plus 100 points and the last gets plus 50 points.

If Trex is announced, any player who holds four twos or three twos and the three of the fourth suit can require the cards to be thrown in. The cards are shuffled and redealt, and the dealer can choose any contract that he has not already played (including Trex).

The game is repeated if a suit is closed without all jacks on the table

== Scoring ==
After 20 deals, when all four players have completed their kingdoms by choosing all five contracts, the game is over. The final scores indicate the result - the players with positive scores win by that amount, and the players with negative scores lose similarly.

The total points available in the five contracts are -75, -130, -100, -195, +500, so the total scores at the end of each kingdom and at the end of the whole game are always zero.

== Tactics ==
=== Common tactics ===
- Open with the suit with the fewest cards, try to run out.
- Keep track how many cards are out of your hand from each suit, and how many have been played.
- Remember what suit each player opened with.
- When someone plays a very low rank (2's and 3's), that usually means they ran out, or almost ran out of that suit.
- When playing partners, it might be a good idea for one partner to keep one high value card of a suit the other partner still has, so they can hand them the game when they are stuck.
- Except in very rare cases, players should not play a suit that every other player ran out of (called tlata'shawy meaning thirteen).
- Tafreesh, is forcing an opponent to collect a trick when all the remaining cards in their hands are either very high or tlata'shawy, in that case they hand a trick to anyone else.
- If a player have a good hand for multiple contracts, the player should choose in this order of importance: Trex, king of hearts, queens, slaps, diamonds.
  - Queens can be more important than king in partners if two queens can be doubled.

=== King of hearts ===
Generally, the king of hearts is an important game, and the easiest to pick if the player has the right cards. One should choose this contract and double the king if they (in order of risk):

1. Have 5 or more hearts including the king (protected king)
2. Have 3-4 hearts of high value (the ace and queen are helpful) including the king, with 2 or less cards of at least one other suit.
3. Have 3-4 hearts including the king with 1 or less cards of at least one other suit.

If the player doesn't have the king of hearts, they should choose this contracts only if all other contracts available are extremely risky, because they might lose the chance to double the king and give an opponent the chance to control the game. It's important to have a high number (4 or more) of high value hearts. It's also preferable to have low values (2's and 3's) in the other suits, to avoid collecting the king of hearts on a trick of another suit.

==== Strategy ====
If a player has the king, one tactic is to start with the suit with the fewest cards until they run out, they can then play the king on that suit if their opponent will collect it.

If a player has 7 or more high value hearts including the king, they can almost guarantee success by leading with hearts until everyone runs out, then play all their high value cards from the other suits, before handing the game to another player with a low value card.

If a player counts cards correctly, they may be able to lead with the king when an opponent has the ace alone in their hand.

When playing partners and the king is on a player's left, they can try not to play hearts until their partner does so, making sure they don't have the ace in their hand. If they do, the first partner should play a suit they ran out of to let them get rid of the ace.

If one partner opened with a card other than 2, and that suit was played one time only, the other partner should play a high rank of that suit to make sure their partner runs out before wasting their low rank card.

If a player only has high cards of the suit their partner has run out of, they should keep playing that suit (high to low) until their partner runs out of another one, or an opponent is forced to collect.

If a player knows for a fact that the player on their right has the ace of hearts, and that the player's partner has the king, it could be possible to lead with hearts to force them to play the ace.

=== Queens ===
The strategy for picking queens is the same for the king of hearts, except it applies to all suits. It is preferable to be able to double at least two queens when a player pick this contract, but not necessary. Queens in a player's hand that they cannot double can at least assure that no one else will double them, and the player can mediate the loss from collecting one with a doubled queen given to an opponent.

==== Strategy ====
Same as the king of hearts except it applies to all suits. Also, the player has to pay to keep track of both kings and aces of each suit.

It is always preferable for a player to collect a non-doubled queen if they can, to make their opponent to collect a doubled queen.

Queens is usually an economic game, where the player has to weight their wins and losses.

Tafreesh (see above) is a very common strategy in this contract, and especially useful when a player has a queen with a lot of protection of low ranks.

=== Diamonds ===
Diamonds is the go-to contract when a player has no other contracts to pick, since each diamond is worth -10 and usually they are distributed between multiple players. A perfect diamond hand is a hand with a lot of low rank diamonds (especially a 2), and generally low rank cards of other suits (although with a hand like that it might be preferable to pick slaps because it's a riskier game). The player can also pick the game if they have only one or two very low rank diamonds. Having another suit with one or two cards is also important, especially if the player has a high run of diamonds.

==== Strategy ====
Generally similar to other trick games. Keep an eye out for high rank diamonds and avoid playing tlata'shawy.

It's also a good idea for a player to keep at least one high-mid rank diamond to allow their partner to hand them the game if they are stuck.

If a player is the one who picked diamonds, it's preferable for them to wait for their partner to lead with diamonds, because usually that means that the player is the one with low rank diamonds.

If allowed, it is preferable to open with a diamond card if the player has only one or two mid-rank diamonds.

=== Slaps ===
Slaps are picked if a player has generally low cards, and preferably a suit with one or two cards, so they can run out and get rid of their high rank cards.

If playing partners, a player should not pick slaps if they only have low ranks as their partner's hand may also have a low value, and keeping a high card will allow them to give hand the game to the player.

==== Strategy ====
When an early game trick has low or medium ranks, the player can leave it. This is preferable, unless their partner is the one collecting it.

In late game, if a player has counted the cards correctly, they can take a trick with a high card and play a low card after, giving it back to an opponent, usually resulting in tafreesh.

Sometimes it's better for a player to lead with high cards so they will not collect tricks in the late game, as above.

One player might play a suit that their partner ran out of in order to let them get rid of their high ranks. Here, the first player may have to play tlata'shawy. This is a risky strategy, but can help when the player want to help their partner avoid tafreesh.

=== Trex ===
Trex is usually the most important and decisive contract (especially in partners), and it's the only positive score game (outside of doubling). Trex favors higher value hands, especially queens through aces. Also having mid rank cards of the same suit in order (e.g. 4, 5, 6 of hearts) is very helpful. Having 2's is detrimental, especially in partners where a player has to reveal them. Furthermore, having no cards of a suit, or having only a queen or higher of a suit will make the game significantly harder, as the player cannot control the game and will have to play cards for their opponents. Having a lonely jack, and no other jacks, is also detrimental because the player will have to play it immediately. On the other hand, having 10, J, Q of a suit gives the player the best start, because the player will not affect the game, forcing other players to play the jacks that the player needs.

==== Strategy ====
Generally, the player should play the cards they need (based on their 2s and their partner's), followed by non-risk cards (aces, 2s, and cards that where the player has the successor), then low risk cards (queens, kings, 3s, and cards where a successor with one card separation), then other cards.

When the player forced to play cards for their opponent, they should try to focus on only one suit, preferably the one they have the most of.

Sometimes, the player might have to keep a card that they or their partner need in their hand, to force a player to play another card that they also need.

If someone is passing, and a player has to play a card for an opponent (especially a 3), they should try to play cards for the one passing. That way, they make sure that the others will be forced to play cards which benefit the player.

It is helpful to see how many cards each player has before playing a card in the late game.

In partners, 2nd and 3rd are the same as 1st and 4th, so players do not need to risk the game if they not sure that their partner will be first.

== Variations ==
The following are some common Trex variations:

- Some play that in the first three contracts, a player who is unable to follow suit must discard a penalty card (king of hearts in contract 1, diamond in contract 2, queen in contract 3) if they have one.
- Some players interchange the scores for diamonds (each diamond costs 10 points) and slapping (each trick costs 15 points).
- Some players reverse all the scores, giving positive points for the first four contracts and negative points for Trex. The object is then to have as low a score as possible at the end. Clearly this makes no difference to the way the game is played.
- Some play the contracts in a different order. For example: trix, girls 3asba, king of hearts, diamonds, collection.
- Trex is sometimes played as a partnership game, partners sitting opposite each other. The game is played the same way - each player gets a turn to choose contracts. There are two differences: (1) in the contract "Trex", after each player has had their first turn, all players must put any 2's that they hold face up on the table, so that everyone knows who has them and (2) scores are kept in terms of teams not individuals.
- It can be agreed in advance that when (King of Hearts) or (Girls) is announced, any player who holds a penalty card can place it face up on the table before the first lead. In this case the player who takes the card in a trick loses twice as much (-150 for the king of hearts, -50 for a queen) and the player who held the card scores +75 for the king of hearts or +25 for a queen.
- Trex Complex is a recent variant in which a dealer can play two or more of the first four contracts at the same time. In this case all the penalty cards and tricks from the contracts being played are scored in that deal. The number of deals is reduced accordingly - for example if a dealer starts by playing Diamonds, Girls and Collection together, then he has only two more deals, which must be King of Hearts and Trex (in either order). This variation is not recommended since it increases the luck factor - a player who is fortunate to deal himself a hand full of low cards can get a huge score by playing contracts 1-4 all at once.
- In Palestine and Jordan Trix complex refers only to the game when all four contracts are played at once while Trix is separate. When combining contracts according to desire of the king of the game, the game is called Trix Combination.

== See also ==
- Barbu (card game)
