= Queen (playing card) =

Playing card with image of a queen

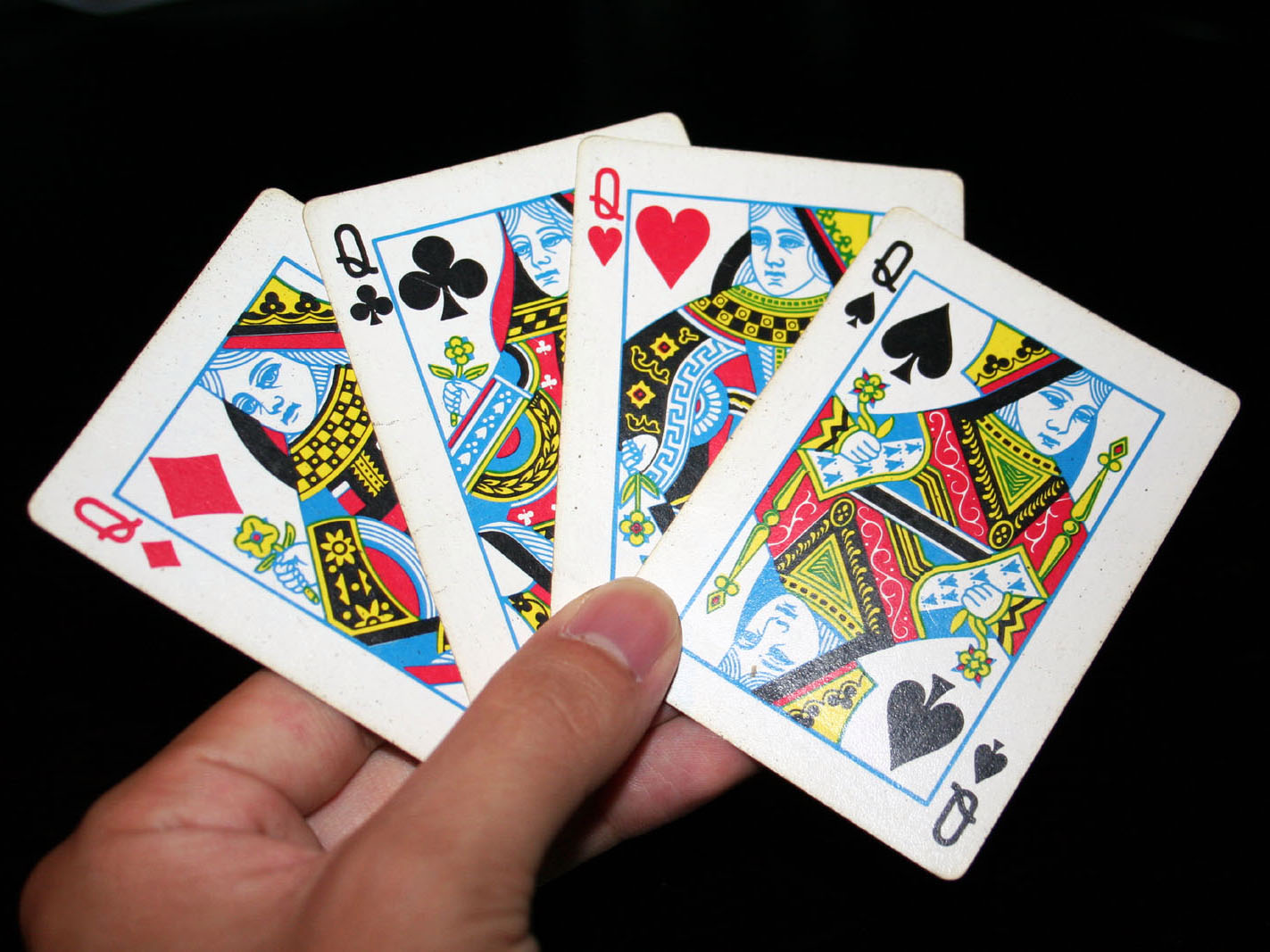
Queen cards of all four suits in the English pattern

The queen is a playing card with a picture of a queen on it. In many European languages, the king and queen begin with the same letter so the latter is often called dame (lady) or variations thereof. In French playing cards, the usual rank of a queen is between the king and the jack. In tarot decks, it outranks the knight which in turn outranks the jack. In the Spanish deck and some Italian decks, the Queen does not exist and the Horse or Bull appears in them instead, with the same role and value.

In several card games, including the middle eastern Trex and French Barbu, the queen is a major card to avoid taking, with each queen taken inflicting a penalty on the player. Similarly, in Hearts, the queen of spades is to be avoided, and is called a variety of unsavoury names.

In the Paris pattern, each court card is identified as a particular historical or mythological personage as follows:

Pallas Athena

Judith,
Biblical figure

Rachel,
Biblical figure

Argine,
an anagram of Regina
(Latin for "queen")

Queens may have been an invention of early German cardmakers. One of the earliest surviving packs of playing cards, the Stuttgart pack (circa 1440), consists of all female courts in two of the four suits where Queens have replaced Kings. The Ambraser Hofjagdspiel (circa 1440 to 1445) and many other surviving 15th-century packs include the Queen as a fourth independent rank from the King, Ober, and Unter. Modern German-suited playing cards have dropped the Queen rank, but French-suited playing cards have since adopted it as a replacement for the Knights.

== Cultural references ==
Regarding the anonymous nursery rhyme, "The Queen of Hearts" (published 1782), Katherine Elwes Thomas claims, in The Real Personage of Mother Goose, that the Queen of Hearts was based on Elizabeth of Bohemia. Benham, in his book Playing Cards: History of the Pack and Explanations of its Many Secrets, notes that French playing cards from the mid-17th century have Judith from the Hebrew Bible as the Queen of Hearts. See also: Queen of Hearts (Alice's Adventures in Wonderland).

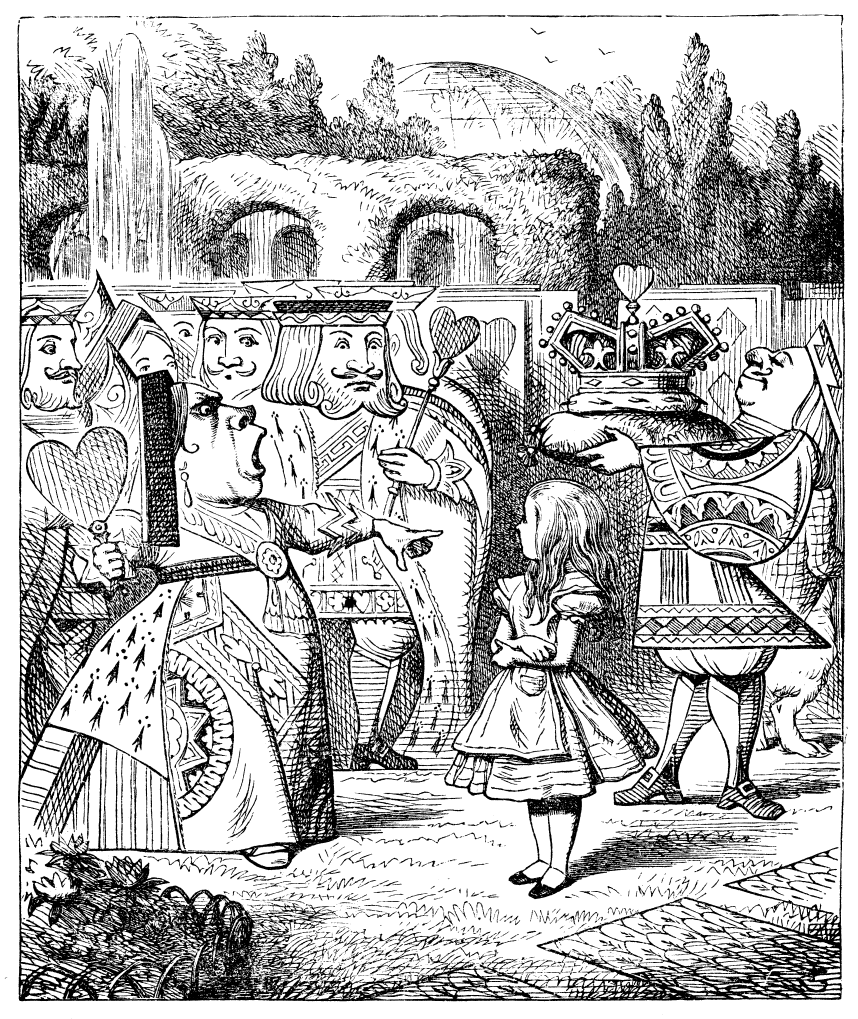
The Queen of Hearts as depicted by Sir John Tenniel in Alice's Adventures In Wonderland (1865) by Lewis Carroll along with other card members (humanized) in the background.

== In Unicode ==
The queens are included in the Playing Cards:

- U+1F0AD 🂭 PLAYING CARD QUEEN OF SPADES
- U+1F0BD 🂽 PLAYING CARD QUEEN OF HEARTS
- U+1F0CD 🃍 PLAYING CARD QUEEN OF DIAMONDS
- U+1F0DD 🃝 PLAYING CARD QUEEN OF CLUBS

== See also ==
- List of poker hand nicknames
- Three-card Monte
