= Unteransetzen =

Austrian card game

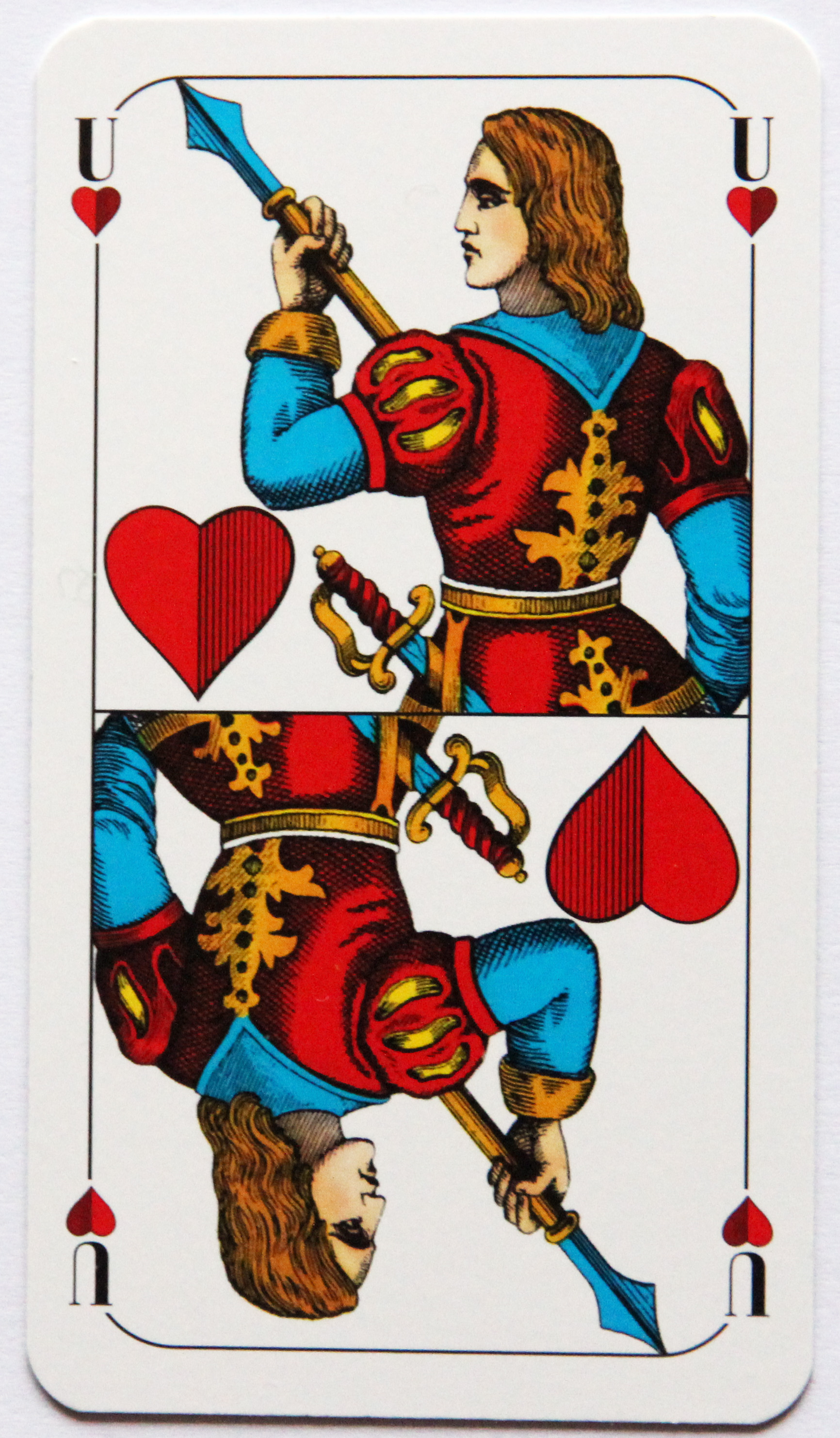
- The Unter of Hearts, the usual starting card
- Origin: Austria, Bavaria
- Alternative names: Unteranlegen, Unterauflegen
- Type: Shedding game
- Players: 2–6
- Age range: 6+
- Cards: 32
- Deck: Tell pattern
- Rank (high→low): A K O U 10 9 8 7
- Play: Clockwise

Related games
- Domino • Sevens • Zehnerlegen

Unteransetzen, Unteranlegen, Unterauflegen or Unterlegen is an Austrian and Bavarian card game of the Domino family for 2-6 players that is played exclusively with German-suited playing cards. The name means refers to the building of cards onto an Unter (the equivalent of the Jack in a French pack). It is a classic children's game.

== Overview ==
Although Domino-style games are common in Europe, the game known as Unteransetzen is only recorded in Austria where it is very popular in Salzburg and Upper Austria, but also played in every other state bar Tyrol. It has many variants: those in which the Unter of Hearts is the starting card (Rot-Mandl-Auflegen, Rot-Unter-Ansetzen or Herz Unter anlegen), those in which the Unter of Leaves is the leading card (Grünmandlansetzen or Grünunteransetzen) and those in which any Unter may start (Unter-Anlegen, Unter-Ansetzen, Unter-Auflegen or Unterlegen).

Unteransetzen is also a component of compendium games such as Rosbiratschka Kein Stich or Herzeln.

== Cards ==
The game is usually played with a Tell pack in Austria or Bavarian pattern pack in Bavaria. In a 2-player game, a third of the pack is placed, face down, as a talon from which to draw. Otherwise all cards are dealt. Cards rank in their natural order – Sow, King, Ober, Unter, Ten, Nine, Eight, Seven – and there are no trumps.

== Playing ==
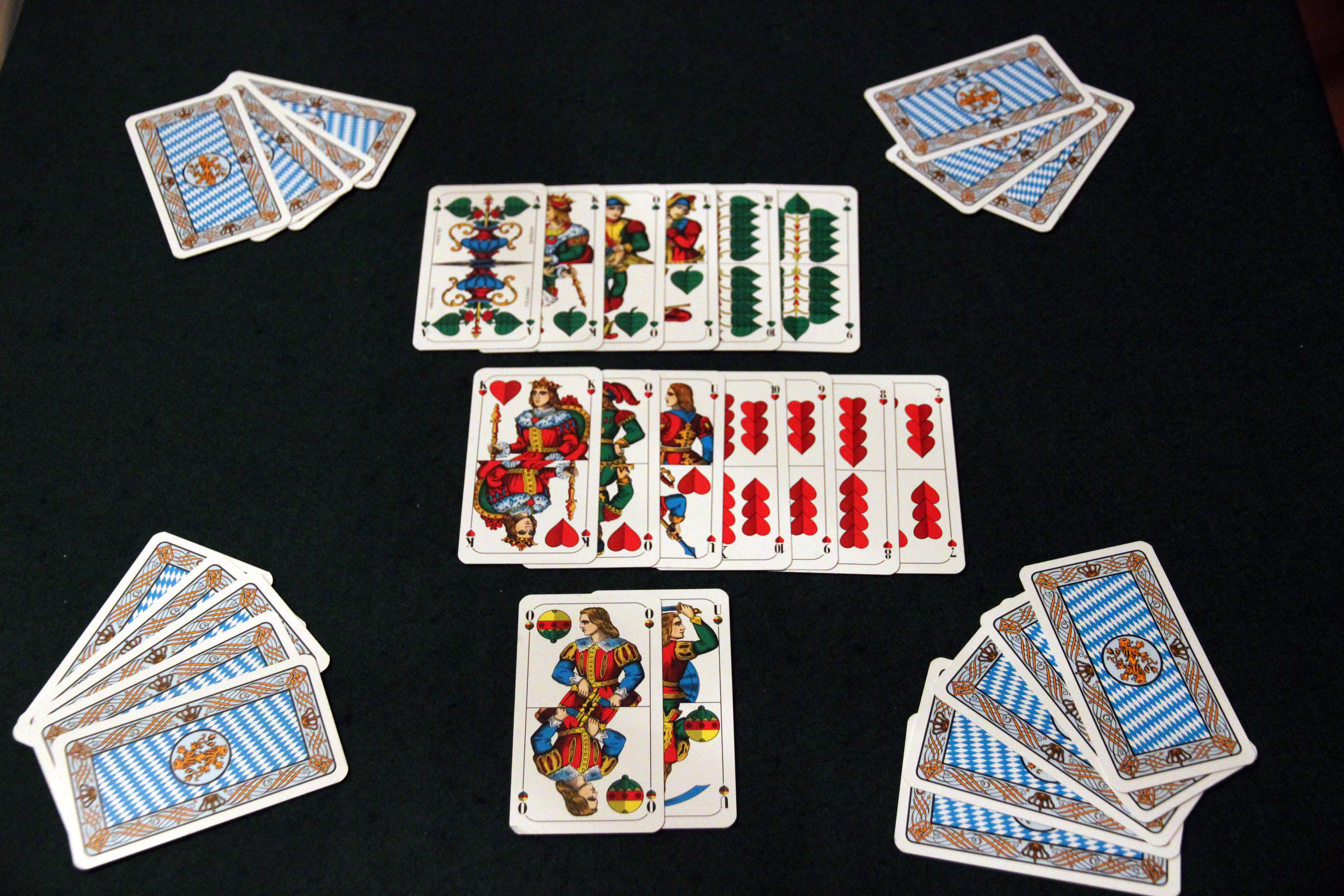
A game of Unteransetzen under way

Usually the player with the Unter of Hearts leads; sometimes the Unter of Leaves is used (hence names like Grünunteransetzen). In clockwise order, players then attempt to 'build' onto the first card by laying next to it the next higher or lower card in suit sequence i.e. the second player would play either the Ober of Hearts or the Ten of Hearts. If a player cannot build in the same suit, they may lay another Unter, above or below the first, in suit order i.e. the U above the U or the U below the U. If they cannot build on an existing suit sequence or on the existing Unters, they must pass and, in a 2-hand game, draw another card from the talon.

The player who is first to shed all their cards is the winner.

== Related games ==
=== Buurnleggen ===
In North Germany there is a game called Buurnleggen (Bauernlegen i.e. Jack-laying). It is described as a simple card game in which a Jack is placed on the table and players complete the rest of the suit before and after it. A player with no suitable card, but with another Jack, may start a new row. The winner is the first to shed all cards held.

== Literature ==
- Altenburger Spielfabrik, Erweitetes Spielregelbüchlein aus Altenburg, 8th edition, Dresden (1988)
- Bamberger, Johannes; Bruhns, Erika (1999). Kartenspiele für Kinder. Perlen-Reihe. Vol. 644. Vienna: Franz Deutiger Verlag. ISBN 3-85223-436-0.
- Geiser, Remigius (2004). "100 Kartenspiele des Landes Salzburg", in Talon, Issue 13.
- Hülsemann, Robert (1930). Das Buch der Spiele. Leipzig: Hesse & Becker.
- Wohlgenannt, Günther (2020). Jassen in Vorarlberg. Lustenau: Buchdruckerei Lustenau. ISBN 978-3-200-07063-9
