= Perlen-Reihe =

Perlen-Reihe (German, lit: "string of pearls") is a series of books founded in 1948 by Adalbert Pechan. It is best known for its self-help guides on a wide variety of topics, including car guides and game instructions. It can be seen as the prototype of the popular advice literature, which is still booming today.

The series was first published by the Austrian publishers of Verlag (Adalbert) Pechan and after several changes of ownership was continued by Deuticke Verlag, which is again an imprint of the Paul Zsolnay Verlag (both of the latter are subsidiaries of Munich's Carl Hanser Verlag). Since 2010 there has been a separate Verlag Perlen series in Vienna with Ulla Harms as publisher. Since 2011, new titles in the Perlen-Reihe have been published by them in the tradition of Adalbert Pechan's little guides.

== Background history ==
From 1946, Sailer's Pocket [Book] Series (Sailers Taschenreihe) was published by Ferdinand Sailer's publishing and printing company. It started with topics that many people might need after the war. The first booklet was a Cultivation Calendar for Allotment Gardeners and Cemeteries (Anbau-Kalender für den Kleingärtner und Grabeländer) and only comprised one page, the next was a Spraying Calendar for Fruit Growing (Spritzkalender für den Obstbau), then a guide to Monthly Work on a Farm for Small Livestock (Monatlichen Arbeiten Im Kleintierhof), New Recipes (Neue Kochrezepte) with a recipe for "whipped cream made from dry milk powder", then things worth knowing about cigarette production From Raw Tobacco to Cigarette (Vom Rohtabak zur Zigarette) and finally a guide to bookkeeping. The library catalogues go up to No. 46, a Textbook on Teaching Yourself Chess (Lehrbuch des Schachspiels zum Selbstunterricht) in 1955, after which a few reprints were issued. In addition there were the following topics: games, motor vehicles and motorcycles, tourism, health, law, breeding and behaviour.

In a profile article about the new edition of the Perlen range, Sailer's series is not mentioned. In an article in the Wiener Zeitung in September 2005 about the Tarot game, Königrufen, it says that this series had previously been published by Adalbert Pechan. Anton Holzer said the same thing in October of the same year in the same medium, but wrongly assumed that after a first volume, Perlen-Reihe for a short time the series was called Sailer's Pocket Book Series (Sailer-Taschenbuchreihe). The series was almost always published with the publisher's name of 'Sailer'. Number 34 published in 1950 by Pechan publisher on commission; No. 37, a German-Italian book of the same year is published by Kauf Verlag and No. 39 in 1951 is published by Pechan. No. 39 in 1951 is only published, according to the German National Library, by Sailer and Pechan, but according to the Austrian entries only by Sailer.

== History ==
Adalbert Pechan (born 1906 in Vienna, died 1960 in Vienna) was a confectionary representative. After he returned home from Soviet captivity and nobody wanted him in his original job, he started to work at a printing company in 1946. Two years later the first volume of the so-called Perlen-Reihe series, (The New) Football Rules in Austria ((Die neuen) Fußballregeln in Österreich) by Heinrich Müller, later No. 621, was published by Ernst Pelda & Sohn. During 1950, Pechan moved the series to his own publishing house and the real success of Pechan's Perlen-Reihe Series (Pechans Perlen Reihe) began. He recruited authors, looked after the manuscripts, took care of cover design, printing, delivery and advertising. He was supported by his wife Hedwig.

The copyright notice for Verlag Adalbert Pechan was soon proudly advertising its international reach with the words “Vienna, Munich, Zurich”, sometimes also with “New York”. Within a few years, the Perlen-Reihe series had established itself, primarily in Austria, but also in German-speaking countries, as a guide-paperback publisher with a recognizable cover design. With this, Pechan set standards in the publishing business. The series logo was designed in-house and the coloured book covers were designed by Viennese graphic studios such as Czermak or Gratsch-Dorner. The volumes offered "the flair of a comprehensive educational offer", according to the printed guideline: "practical and worth knowing for everyone". Pechan produced and sold those titles that promised success, responded quickly and reprinted when the market seemed cheap. He not only sold the best books through bookstores, but - to the displeasure of the Chamber of Commerce - also through direct buyers such as railway station kiosks or driving schools. Even if the volumes were sold throughout the German-speaking area, the series is a landmark of Austrian post-war culture.

In 1960, Adalbert Pechan died as a result of overwork after three heart attacks. By then three million copies had been sold. His widow, Hedwig Pechan, was able to keep the company, now known as Verlag Adalbert Pechan’s Witwe, on the road to success for another decade. In 1970 she sold Perlen-Reihe to the in-house printing company F. Hirsch in Stockerau. There the covers of the books were given a cellophane cover. The presentation and the topics were not adapted to the times and less popular titles were added. In 1983, the publishing house was given a new owner, who was looking in vain to keep up with the times as the Verlag Perlen-Reihe with larger formats and supplementary video and audio tape editions. Deuticke Verlag took over the series in June 1997. Everything was changed except for the logo. The books were now bound, which caused the price to rise sharply, and "the covers now combined lifestyle design with tastelessness." In December 2003, Deuticke was sold to Ernst Klett and transferred to Paul Zsolnay Verlag in August 2004.

In order to offer the little guidebooks as they were originally designed by Adalbert Pechan, the new guidebooks from the Perlen-Reihe publishing house have again been produced with soft covers and in their original format (105 × 148 mm) since 2011. The typography of the booklet was completely revised by Michael Karner, the book covers are illustrated by Peter Jani. The little guides have also been produced in an environmentally friendly and low-pollutant manner since 2011. Publisher Ulla Harms has set herself the goal of rebuilding the series in the old format, timeless design and printed with the most modern environmental standards.

Some of the titles in the old series are still listed under the available books, no new titles have been added since 2005. New guides produced in 2011 can be found under the publishing title Perlen-Reihe (with hyphen). It should not be confused with the "Perlen Reihe" (without hyphen) from the Swiss Knapp publishing house.

== Publishing programme ==
A few years after the end of the war, the do-it-yourself idea fell on fertile ground in Austria. The central motto of the Perlen-Reihe series was "help yourself!" and was addressed to everyone who wanted to get ahead in middle class society through their own efforts and it became a key to the post-war years of the Austro-German economic miracle. They ranged from practical books for the motorist, advice for aquarium owners to history guides for mothers. The aim was to impart carefully chosen skills and abilities to as many people as possible; they were guides for ordinary people who wanted to get ahead. The Perlen-Reihe series may be regarded as a prototype of popular advice literature that is still booming today. The authors had practical experience and shared their knowledge on how to cook, repair, direct, care for, breed, dance, play, write letters, behave well, spend free time and much more. And they conveyed specialist knowledge, such as 666 questions and answers about operas and operettas and covered geography, technology, painting and famous personalities. But they also had health advice. The only topic absent from the series, understandably, was recent history.

In Austria, the series became famous for two main focuses, which are still associated with the name of Perlen-Reihe: car advice and game instructions. Many of these titles continued to appear in new editions and were reliable bestsellers for years. If the same topic was dealt with by a new author, the number was retained and often the title as well. Generations of learner drivers used the booklets to prepare for their driving test. After the fifth edition, the Driving License Commission decided to change its questions and the publisher adapted. The Viennese Street Directory was basic equipment for every taxi driver in the capital.

At Deuticke, the subject of humour was further expanded with reference works on various joke topics and celebrity numbers were added.

== Selection of titles ==
- Advice
  - Volume 614 – Fritz Beck (Pseudonym?): Perfekt tanzen, 14 editions from 1958 to 1970 with around 100,000 copies sold
    - Volume 614 – Rudolf Lidmila: Perfekt tanzen, entirely new edition: 1991
    - Volume 614 – Eddy Franzen: Perfekt Tanzen, 2013
  - Volume 678 – Rudolf Wasinger: Erkenne Deine Mitmenschen. Praktische Winke zur Menschenkenntnis im Alltag, Volumes 1–12, 2nd edn. (6–12 Tsd.): 1957
  - Volume 710 – Ing. Otto Heinz: Einfrieren und Tiefkühlen
  - Leo Zakl: Jiu Jitsu und Judo. Hilf dir Selbst!, 8 editions to 1958 und 44,000 copies sold
  - Mutti, bitte eine Geschichte. Hilfsbuch für Mütter
  - Aquariumfreund, gib acht!
  - Kochkunde für Junggesellen und Strohwitwer
  - Richtige Diät für den kranken Darm
  - Volume 1000 (from 2005) – Ewald Plachutta, Christoph Wagner: Die 100 klassischen Gerichte Österreichs, 2005, ISBN 3-552-06034-0 (first edition: Die 100 klassischen Gerichte Österreichs, Deuticke, 2003, ISBN 3-85223-471-9)
    - Volume 1000 (seit 2005) – Ewald Plachutta, Christoph Wagner: The 100 Classic Dishes of Austria, 2005, ISBN 3-552-06033-2 (first edition: The culinary heritage of Austria: 100 classic dishes, Deuticke, 2003 ISBN 3-85223-473-5)
- Travel
  - Volume 206 – Dr. Liliane Umfahrer: Wir fahren nach Jugoslawien, 3 editions from the late 1950s to early 1980s, 20,000 copies sold
  - Volume 1000 (to 2005) – Hans Meyer: Zu Besuch in Wien. Ein Wiener Stadtführer, 1st edn.: 1951, 3rd edn.: 1959, 4th edn.: 1962, 5th edn.: 1966, 6th edn.: 1970, 8th edn.: 1981
    - Vol. 1000 E (to 2005) – Hans Meyer (author), A. F. Naerr (ed.): On a visit to Vienna. A Vienna city guide, Pearl Books, 1st edn.: 1957; 2nd edn.: 1962; 3rd edn.: 1966; 1972
    - No. 1000 F (bis 2005) – Hans Meyer (author), Bernhard Weiss (ed.): En visite à Vienne, Perlen-Reihe, 1963
- Did you know?
  - Volume 626 – Weißt du das?
    - Volume VI: Eduard R. König: Weißt du das ? Frag mich etwas über Technik und Erfinder – 600 Fragen und Antworten, 2nd edn.: 1957
    - Volume VII: Eduard R. König: Weißt du das? Frag mich etwas über Opern und Operetten – 666 Fragen und Antworten, 1st edn.: 1953, 3rd edn.: 1966
    - Volume VIII: Eduard R. König: Weißt du das? Frag mich etwas über Geographie – 600 Fragen und Antworten, 2nd edn. (5–10 Tsd.): 1958
    - Volume XII: Adalbert Pechan: Weisst du das? Frag mich über Vorrang. 127 Erklärungen, 127 Abbildungen, 1st edn.: 1957; 10th edn. (131–145 Tsd.): 1964, 16th edn.: 1969
    - Volume XIII: Rudolf Heinrich: Weisst du das? – Frag mich über gebräuchliche Fremdwörter, 1958
  - Volume 1009 – Erich Kronthaler [d. i. Erich Hrdlicka]: Kennst Du die Kirchen Wiens?, 1959
    - Part 1: Die Kirchen und Kapellen der Inneren Stadt, unter Einschluß der Karls- und Votivkirche
    - Part 2: Die Kirchen und Kapellen des zweiten to zehnten Bezirks
    - Part 3: Die Kirchen und Kapellen des XI. to XXIII. Bezirks
  - Volume 1015 – Leo Parthé (ed.) Reinhilde Becker (illustrated from the 4th edn. 1998): Die schönsten und bekanntesten Wienerlieder / Die schönsten Wiener Lieder, 1989–2006: 6 editions
  - Hans Ulrich: Stammbuch-Verse und Blumensprache, 5th edn. (23–28. Tsd.): 1964
- Motoring books:
  - Volume 509 – Ing. Eduard König: Motorrad- und Motorrollerprüfung. Führerschein A (4th edn. 1957)
  - Kraftfahrer, prüfe dich selbst! / Prüfe dich selbst!, from the 1970s also in Serbo-Croat.
  - Moderne Autoschule
  - Volume 507 – Dr. H. Benes/Ing. E. Nigischer: Prüfe Dich! Das newste Verkehrsvorschriftenbilderbuch für jedermann / Prüfe dich! Das newste Verkehrsvorschriften Bilderbuch, 3rd improved edn. (41–60 Tsd.): 1954; 4th improved edn. (61–82 Tsd.): 1954; 12th edn. (226–250 Tsd.): 1956; 14th improved edn.: 1957; 41st full revised. edn. (736–760 Tsd.): 1964
  - Volume 512 – Eduard König: Das Dieselhandbuch (mit den newsten Vorschriften für Lastwagen und Omnibus), 1st edn. (1–15 Tsd.): 1955
  - Volume 517 – Ing. Fritz Cavallar: Das Moped-Handbuch with den newsten Vorschriften, 2nd edn.: 1966
  - Volume 1002 – Hanns Hardegg: Neues Wiener Straßenverzeichnis 1. – 23. Bezirk, 7th expanded edn.: 1974
  - Franz Fischer: Die Führerscheinprüfung. Verkehrsvorschriften für alle Führerscheingruppen with den amtlichen Prüfungsfragen, ISBN 3-85223-201-5, 69th entirely new edn.: 1986; 72nd edn.: 1991; 74th edn.: 1990; 76th edn.: 1994; 5th revised edn.: 1995
  - Wilfried Mohaupt: Die Führerscheinprüfung. Verhalten im Strassenverkehr, with den amtlichen Prüfungsfragen (Führerscheingruppe B), ISBN 3-85223-202-3, 16th revised edn.: 1991
- Games
  - Volume 621 – Heinrich Müller: (Die neuen) Fussballregeln in Österreich, Ernst Pelda & Sohn, 1st edn.: 1948
    - Volume 621 – Leo Zakl: Internationale Fussballregeln, Pechan, 1st edn.: 1954, 2nd edn.: 1957
  - Volume 649 – Franz Unger: Wir legen Patiencen, 1964
  - Volume 651 – Alexander from Szanto: Poker, 1983
  - Volume 680 – Franz C. Mickl-Unger: Das alt-bekannte Wiener Schusterbuben-Traumbuch. Mit den richtigen Lottozahlen, 5th edn. (31–36 Tsd.): 1962
  - Die schönsten Patiencen
  - Wer spielt mit?
  - Lerne Bridge
  - Bieten, Watten und Perlaggen
- Humour
  - Volume 230 – Leo Parthé: Wir gratulieren! Heitere und besinnliche Glückwünsche für alle festlichen Anlässe 1980–1998: 6 editions
  - Die besten Ärzte-Witze
  - Wenn Frauen boshaft lachen
  - Die besten Sportlerwitze
  - Die besten Ausreden
