= Rosbiratschka =

Card game originating in Germany

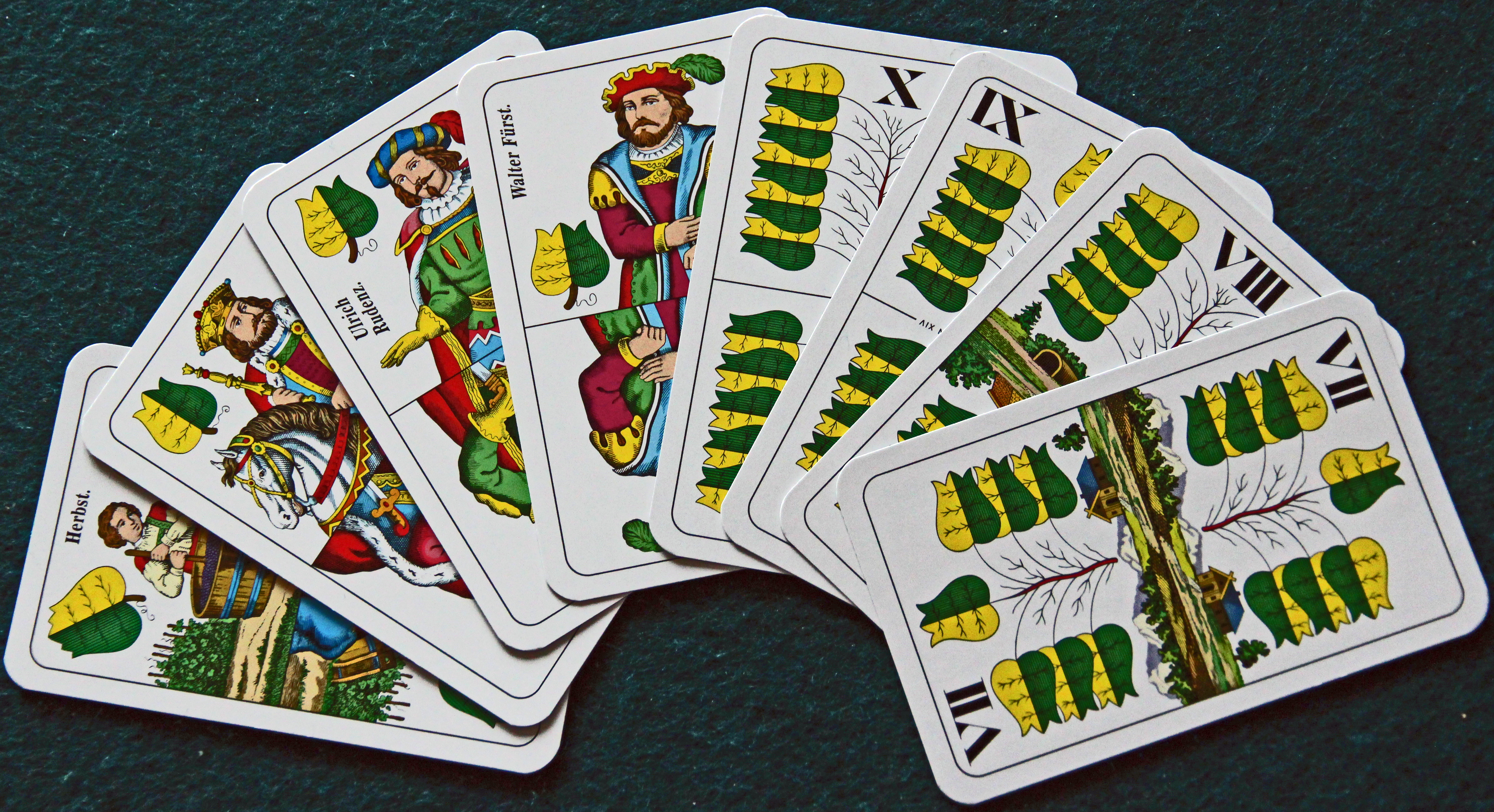
- The suit of Leaves in a William Tell pattern German-suited pack
- Origin: Germany
- Type: Compendium game
- Players: 3 or 4
- Age range: 12+
- Cards: 32
- Deck: German pack
- Rank (high→low): A K O U 10 9 8 7
- Play: Clockwise
- Playing time: 30 minutes

Related games
- Barbu • Herzeln • Kein Stich • Lorum • Quodlibet
- 6 deals x 1 round = 6 games

Rosbiratschka is a trick-taking, compendium, card game for three or four players that is played with a German-suited pack of 32 or 24 cards.

== Overview ==
Despite the name, Rosbiratscka is a game of German origin for three to four players that is known in different regions under different names. It is easy to learn and suitable as a parlour game i.e. with friends and family.

== Rules ==
The following rules for four players are based on Altenburger.

=== Aim ===
A full game involves a partie of six different contracts and the aim is to score as few penalty points as possible.

== Rule for four players ==
A 32-card pack is used with German suits i.e. Acorns, Leaves, Hearts and Bells. The ranking of the cards in each suit is Sow (~Ace), King, Ober, Unter, Ten, Nine, Eight, Seven. Each player is dealt 8 cards (2–3–3). The player to the left of the dealer (forehand) leads to the first trick. Players must follow suit (Farbzwang) and the highest card wins the trick. there are no trumps. If suit cannot be followed, a player may discard a card of his choice. Six individual contracts are played:

1. No Tricks! (Keinen Stich!): each player attempts to avoid taking any tricks as in the game of Ramsch. Every trick taken scores one penalty point (minus point). If a player takes no tricks, each trick counts 2 points. If a player takes all 8 tricks however, it is a slam (Durchmarsch) which earns 8 plus points.
2. No Hearts! (Keine Herzen!): each player aims to take as few Heart cards as possible in his tricks. Each one taken scores a penalty point. If a player takes no Hearts at all, each Heart card counts 2 penalty points. If a player takes all the Heart cards however, he scores 8 plus points.
3. No Unters!' In No Unters! (Keine Unter!) each player aims to take as few Unters in his tricks as possible. For every Unter captured, 2 penalty points are scored. If a player has no Unters, then each Unter is worth four penalty points. If a player gets all 4 Unters however, he receives 8 plus points.
4. No King of Hearts! (Achtung, Herz-König! i.e. "Beware the King of Hearts"): each player tries not to capture the King of Hearts. If the King of Hearts is player, the deal ends and the player who has captured him receives 8 penalty points.
5. Hundred!' (Hundert!): the aim is to play cards so as not to be the first to exceed a given number. For this purpose the cards count as follows: Ace 11, King 4, Ober 3, Unter 2, Ten 10, Nine 0, Eight 0, Seven 0. Everyone lays a card in the middle and counts its collective value aloud e.g. "Ten, 10!" "Ace 21!" etc. Whoever is the first to exceed 25 gets a penalty point, whoever is first to exceed 50 gets 2 penalty points and whoever is first to exceed 100 receives 5 penalty points. On exceeding 100 points, the deal ends.

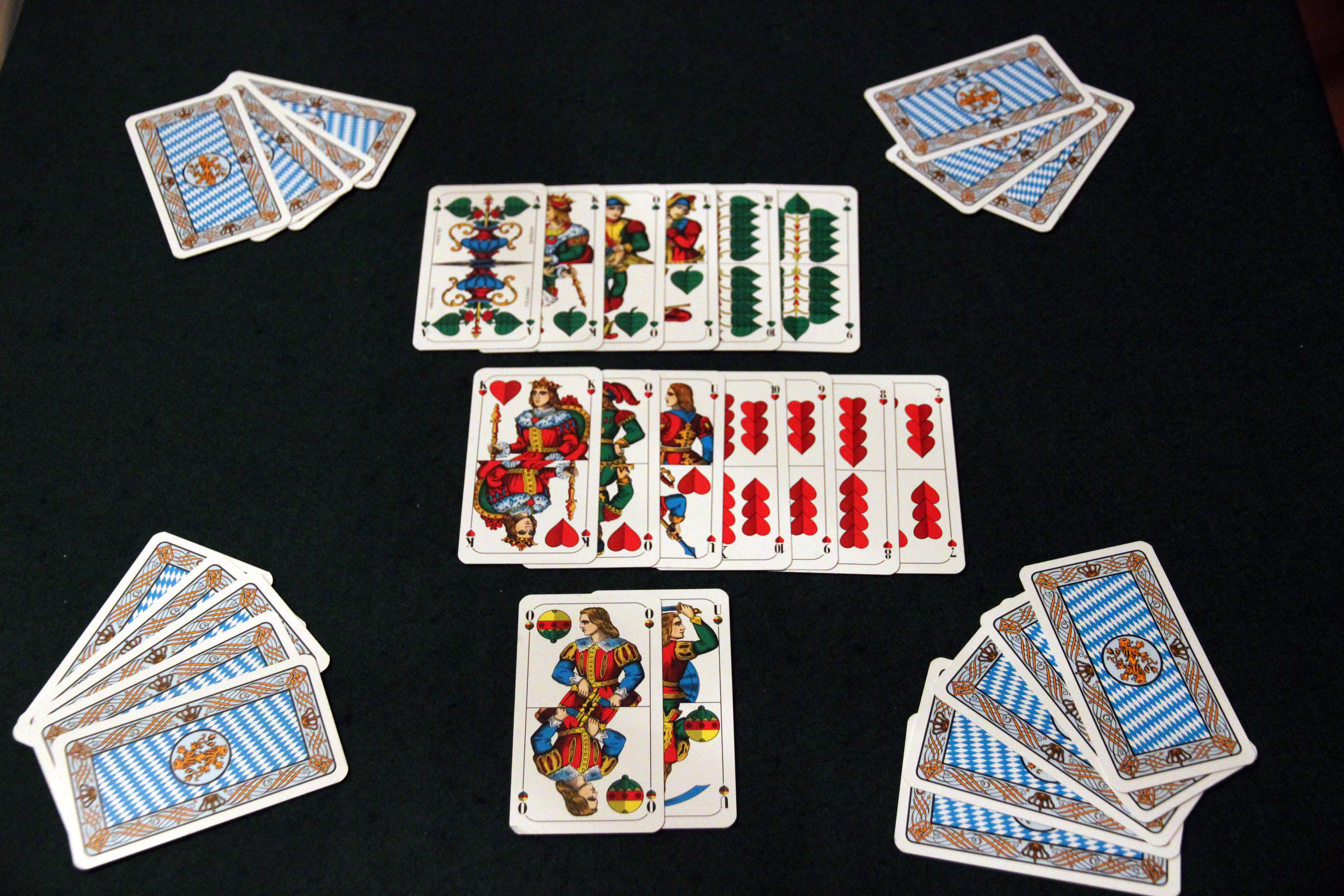
The final deal, Rosbiratschka, in progress

1. Rosbiratschka!: effectively the game of Unteransetzen which involves laying off cards to the table, building up sequences in each suit (see illustration). The aim is to avoid being the last player holding any cards. Forehand must lead with an Unter. If he does not have one, the next player must lead and so on until someone is able to play an Unter. As soon one is played, the next player must lay off next to it a card of the same suit that ranks one above or below it. If a player is unable to do this, he may play another Unter above or below the first and start a new row in a different suit. If a player cannot lay off a card, he says "pass!". When just one player is left with cards in his hand the others shout "Rosbiratschka!" and that player receives 8 penalty points.

== Rules for three, five or six players ==
For three players, remove all Sevens and Eights from a 32-card pack and deal eight cards to each player; score 2 minus points for the Ace and King of Hearts in deal 2. For five players remove the Six of Bells and deal seven each. Score 2 minus points for the last trick in deal 1. For six players use a 36-card pack and deal six to each player; score 2 minus points for the first and last tricks in deal 1.

== Literature ==
- "Rosbiratschka". Erweitertes Spielregelbüchlein aus Altenburg. Leipzig: Verlag Altenburger Spielkartenfabrik. 1983. pp. 173ff.
- Berthold, Manuela (2014-03-01). "Die tollen Sechs". Neues Deutschland.
