= Kein Stich =

Card game originating in Germany

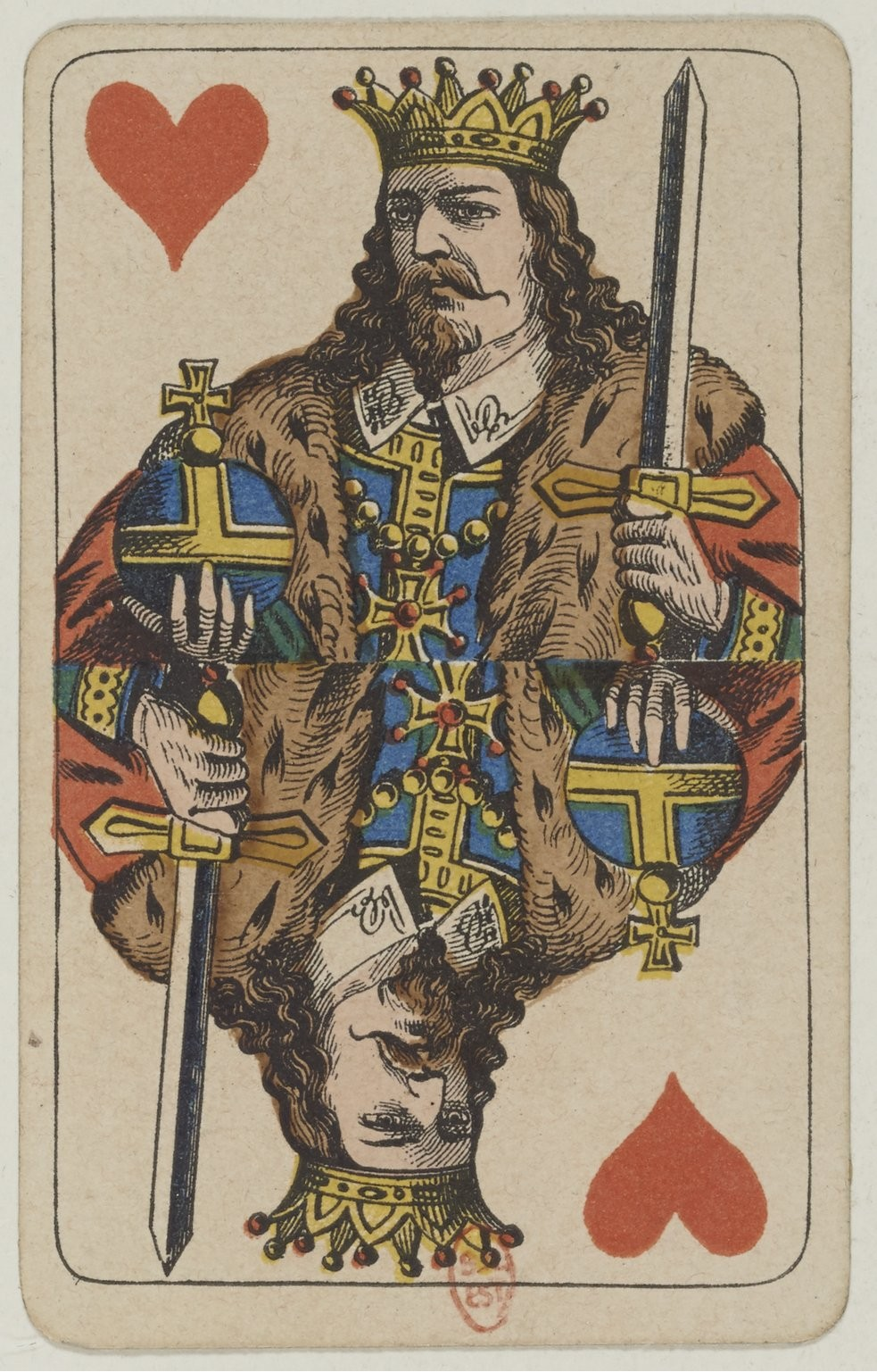
- The card to avoid in "No Max!"
- Origin: Germany
- Type: Compendium game
- Players: 4 (3-6)
- Cards: 32
- Deck: German or French pack
- Rank (high→low): A K O U 10 9 8 7
- Play: Clockwise
- Playing time: 25 minutes

Related games
- Barbu • Lorum • Herzeln • Quodlibet • Rosbiratschka • Rumpel
- 5 deals x 1 round = 5 games

Kein Stich ("No Tricks") is a card game, which is well known in the German-speaking parts of the world under various regional names such as Herzeln (not to be confused with Herzeln or Herzla), King Louis, Kunterbunt ("Multicoloured"), Schwarze Sau ("Black Pig"), Fritz, Brumseln, Fünferspiel ("Fives"), Lieschen, Lizzy or Pensionisteln ("Pensioners").

The special feature of this game is that it consists of a compendium of five different deals. In the first four it is a trick-taking game; the fifth contract is a melding game, rather like Elfer Raus ("Eleven Out"). If it is played for money, small stakes (e.g. 5 cents) are paid into a pot during the trick-taking games and the money is paid out in the last game. The word "pfennig" is used here to mean the stake.

== Cards ==
Kein Stich is normally played with a pack of 32 German-suited cards. French playing cards may also be used. The cards rank as follows: Ace/Deuce, King, Ober/Queen, Unter/Jack, Ten, Nine, Eight, Seven.

== Rules ==
The following describes the most common variant, which is for 4 players who are dealt 8 cards each. There are four trick-taking deals during which players contribute 160 pfennigs to the pot, followed by a lay-off deal in which they compete to win the contents of the pot.

The player to the left of the dealer leads to the first trick. Thereafter, the winner of a trick leads to the next one. The fundamental rule is that players must follow suit (this is known as Farbzwang); there are no trumps. That means that if a player has at least one card of the led suit, it must be played. Tricks are won by the highest card of the led suit. The five deals are:

1. No Tricks (Kein Stich): In the first deal, players aim to take as few tricks as possible. Each trick taken costs 5 pfennigs.
2. No Hearts (Kein Herz): In the second deal, players pay a penalty of 5 pfennigs for each Heart card they take. The number of tricks taken is irrelevant. But Hearts are not trumps, so Heart cards may be discarded to a trick led by another suit, if the player cannot follow suit.
3. No Obers (Kein Ober): In the third deal, the Hearts and the number of tricks won are unimportant. This time, each Ober captured costs 10 pfennigs.
4. No Max (Kein Herz-König): In the fourth deal it is now important not to capture "Max", the King of Hearts, well known from the card game, Watten. He costs 40 pfennigs.
5. Domino (Legerunde): In the fifth and last deal, which is basically the Domino-type game of Unteransetzen, the player who is dealt the Unter of Acorns (or in a French pack, the Jack of Clubs) leads, by playing it to the table. Each player in turn must either lay off a card to the Unter of Acorns or play another Unter. If neither is possible, they pass. Whoever, is the first out, wins 100 pfennigs; the second out wins 50; the third, 10, and the last out gets nothing. The stakes and the winnings, etc., should be agreed by the players beforehand.

In other variants, the player with the Unter of Hearts leads off. Depending on which Unter is selected to be first the contract may be known locally as Eichelunteranlegen (Unter of Acorns leads) or Herzunteranlegen (Unter of Hearts leads).

== Variants ==
=== Alternative deals ===
- Black Pig. In the variant known as Black Pig (Schwarze Sau) the Queen of Spades takes the place of "Max" in the fourth deal. cf. Hearts.

=== Four deals ===
- King Louis: the first deal is omitted and the game starts with No Hearts. The number of points or pfennigs available in the final lay-off deal reduces correspondingly to 120.

=== Six deals ===
In six-deal versions, the number of points or pfennigs won in the final lay-off deal rises to 200.

- No Penultimate Trick (Kein zweitletzter Stich) involves an additional trick-taking deal in which the penultimate trick costs 40 pfennigs.
- No First or Last Trick (Kein erster, letzter Stich) is like the preceding variant, except that players aim to avoid taking the first and last tricks, which each cost 20 pfennigs.

=== Two deals ===
- Power, Blitz or Hardcore The first four deals are combined into one and players pay a penalty for: each trick taken, each Heart card, each Ober and the King of Hearts. For example, if the following trick is won - D, O, 10, K it costs 1 stake for the trick, 4 for the Hearts, 2 for the Ober of Hearts and 8 for the King of Hearts.

=== Additional rules ===
- March: players may score for a march (Durchmarsch) in all the trick-taking rounds. If a player wins every trick, they win 50 pfennigs and the others pay 30 pfennigs each.

=== Others ===
Variants exist for 3 to 6 players and for playing with 24 or 52 cards.
