= Lorum (card game) =

Hungarian card game

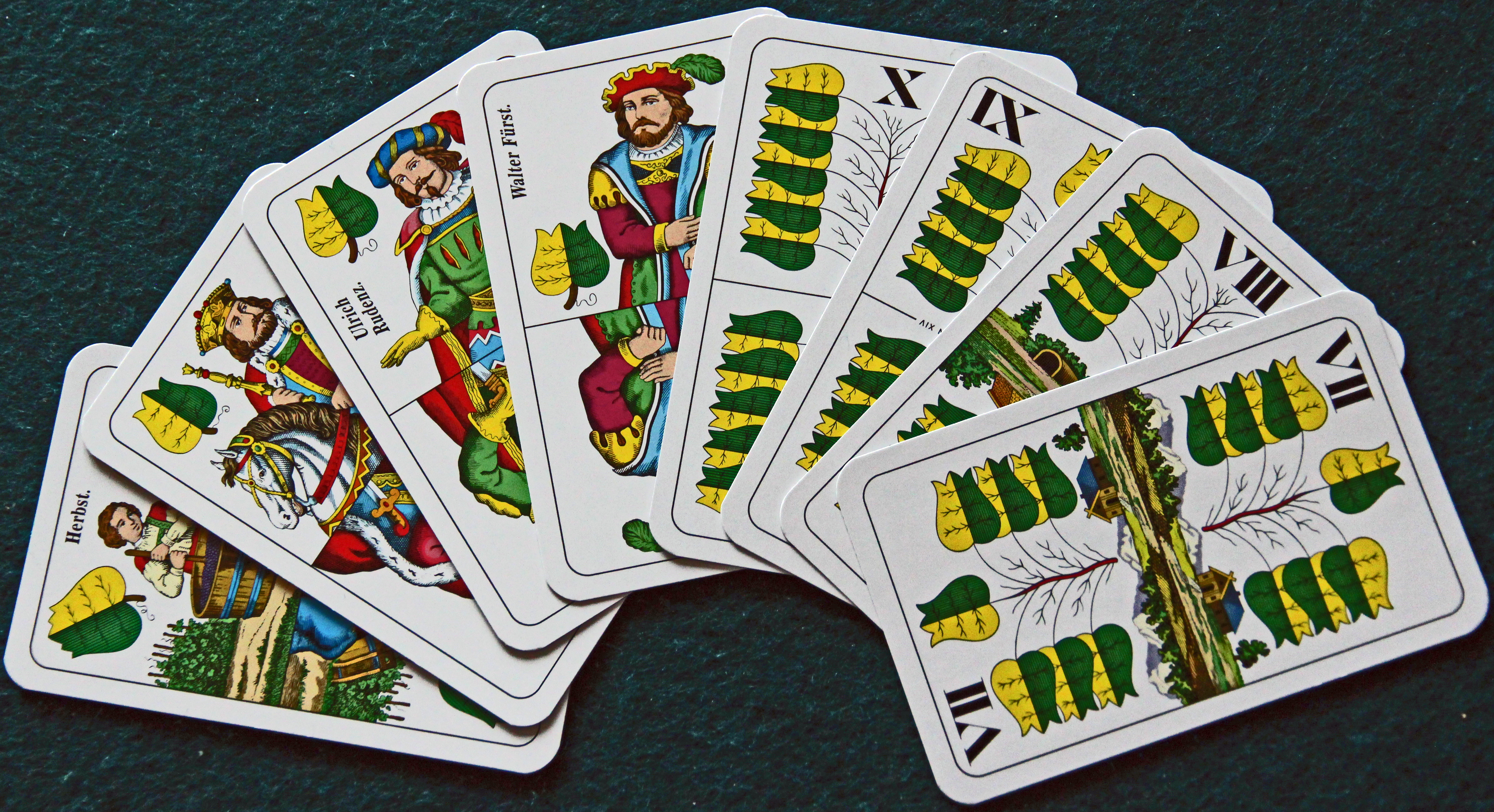
- The suit of leaves from a German-suited pack
- Origin: Hungary
- Type: Compendium game
- Players: 4
- Cards: 32
- Deck: German
- Rank (high→low): A K O U 10 9 8 7
- Playing time: 1½ hours

Related games
- Barbu • Herzeln • Kein Stich • Quodlibet • Rosbiratschka • Rumpel
- 8 deals x 4 rounds = 32 games.

Lorum or lórum is an old, Hungarian, compendium card game for 4 players. Although it is the ancestor of the French game, barbu, it is still played today. It uses a German-suited pack (Hungarian 'William Tell' or German pattern) of 32 cards and comprises 8 individual contracts, each with different rules, each of which is played four times so that a session consists of a total of 32 individual games and lasts about 1½ hours.

== History ==
Lorum is described by Parlett as a "Hungarian forerunner of Barbu", first recorded in 1916, although there is also a 1904 reference to it being played in the author's youth, which suggests it may have been already popular by the end of the 19th century. However, its rules were not published until the 1920s. The game was popular among the Hungarian Germans before the Second World War, along with Ulti, Schnapsen and Mariasch, and is still played in central and Eastern Europe today, for example, in the Czech town of Kladno where it is known as Lóra.

== Cards ==
A standard, 32-card, Hungarian- or German-pattern, German-suited, pack is used comprising four suits - Acorns, Leaves, Hearts and Bells - each of eight cards ranking in their natural order: Ace, King, Ober, Unter, Ten, Nine, Eight and Seven. There are no trumps.

== Aim ==
Points are awarded in different ways for each contract. The overall aim is to win the lowest number of points.

== Playing ==
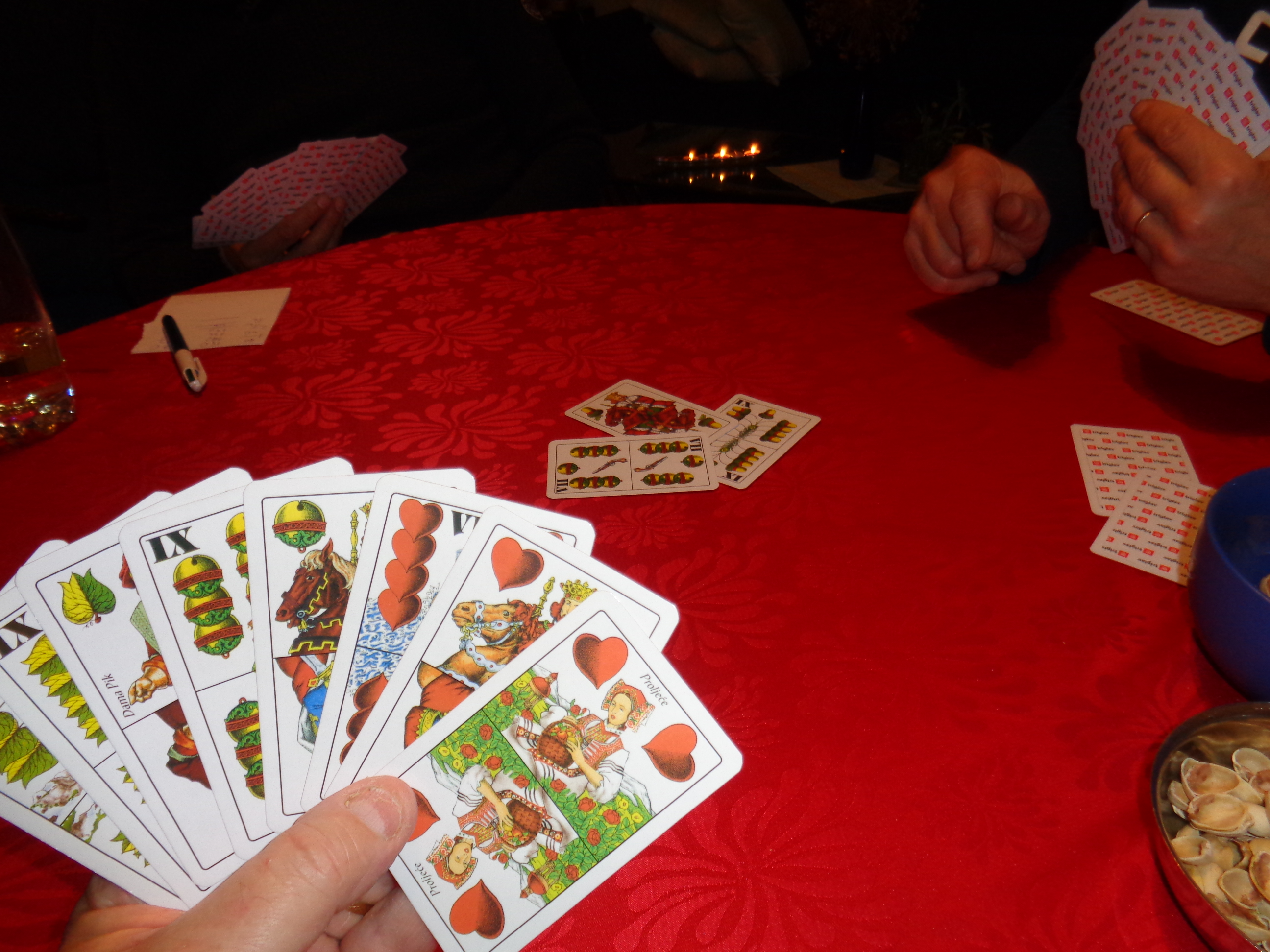
Game of lorum in progress.

Lorum consists of 8 different individual games or contracts, each with its own aim and rules. Each game is played four times, making a total of 32 games in a session. A session may thus last about 1½ hours. Dealing and play are in clockwise order. The winner of a trick leads to the next. Suit must be followed; if that is not possible, any card may be discarded. The trick is taken by the highest card of the led suit, and there are no trumps.

== Contracts ==
The composition of the eight contracts varies, but always comprises the following four deals:

1. No hearts. In no hearts (Herzlos) also called Reds (Rote), the aim is to avoid winning hearts or "reds". A red may not be led to the first trick, unless forehand only has reds. Players may not discard a red to the first trick unless they only have reds. In the succeeding tricks, reds may be discarded if a player has no card of the led suit. Each red card taken in tricks scores 1 point.
2. Obers. The aim is in Obers (Ober or Damenlos) to avoid capturing Obers. Each Ober is worth 2 points. An Ober may not be led to the first trick, nor may an Ober be laid to it unless the player only has an Ober in the led suit (i.e. the Ober is a singleton). In the remaining tricks, Obers may be discarded at any stage if a player cannot follow suit.
3. No tricks. In no tricks (Stichlos), also just tricks (Stiche), the aim is to avoid taking any tricks. Each trick is worth a point.
4. Lorum. This contract, also called Kirako ("domino"), is, like the last deal in most compendium games, a domino-type contract. Forehand leads any card to the table. The next player in turn must play either a card of the same rank in another suit or lay off the next highest card of the same suit next to the first card. An Ace follows a Seven. A player unable to play a card, misses a turn. Players may not miss a turn if they are able to play. Every turn missed costs one point. As soon as the first player goes out by laying off their last card, the remaining players score a point for each card still held in the hand. Alternatively, the deal can continue until each player in succession goes out. In this variation, the second player to go out scores 1 point per card, the third player, 2 points per card and the last player, 3 points per card.
  - Variation: Unteranlegen. The first card played must be an Unter (a common practice in domino games). Players then either lay another Unter or the next higher or lower card in suit sequence. The four suit sequences are terminated by the 7 at one end and the ace at the other.

In addition, one or more (typically four) of the following contracts are usually inserted between the third deal above (no tricks) and the final deal (lorum).

- First and last trick. In first and last (Erster und letzter Stich) the aim is to avoid taking the first and last tricks; each of which counts as 4 (variation: 5) points. Short variant: The pack is well shuffled, and only two cards are dealt to each player, the stock being given to the next dealer. The first player to lead plays one of the two cards held. The winner of the trick then leads to the 'last' trick. Suit must be followed if possible. Each trick scores 4 (or 5) points.
- Fifth trick. In fifth trick (Fünfter Stich) players must avoid taking the fifth trick, after which the deal is ended. It scores 8 points.
- Seventh trick. As fifth trick except players avoid taking the seventh trick.
- Red king. The aim in red king, also called red king-less (Herz-König-los), is to avoid capturing the 'red king' (Roter König) i.e. the king of hearts. It scores: 16 points when captured in the first trick, 8 points in the second to seventh tricks, 32 points in the last trick and 64 points if announced before playing the last trick.
  - Variation: Der Blinde. In the 'blind' variation, the cards are not turned over but only seen individually on being played. Whoever captures the red king scores 5 points. Players who look at their cards are penalised 5 points and the cards are reshuffled and redealt.
- Hairy Ape. As red king, but players hold their cards facing their opponents; then play cards at random. If two or more are of the same suit, the highest wins, otherwise each card 'takes itself. The player who take the red king scores 8 points.
- Train (Vonat or Suta). As hundred in Rosbiratschka. Using the ace–ten scoring system, card points are added cumulatively as they are played. The first to exceed 25 wins 1 point, 50 wins 2 points, 75 wins 3 points and 100 wins 4 points.
- Quart(el) or Kvart. In quartel the idea is that, to the first card played, the 3 next higher cards of the same suit must be added in sequence by whoever has them until and unless no-one has the next higher card. Player do not need to play in clockwise order. The trick is won by the player who placed the last card in the sequence and that player then leads to the next trick. An eligible player who has the highest card of its suit in hand at that stage of the game (usually an ace, but also a seven if the eight of the same suit has already been played), can put it away as "high" ("clear"). The game ends when the first player goes out by discarding their last card. This may not necessarily be the current player. The cards remaining in the other players' hands score 1 point each.
- All bad (Mindenrossz). A combination of several contracts e.g. no tricks, no hearts, no Obers and no red king.

== Scoring ==
Instead of points, counters, chips, beans or coins may be used. If, for example, beans are used, each player is given 20 beans at the outset and one penny (pfennig) or similar coin. In addition, there is a pot which is initially empty. Instead of recording points, beans are paid to the pot or to the winning player. In the contracts of Red King, First and Last Trick and Fifth Trick, beans are paid to the pot. If, in Reds or Obers, there are one or two players with no reds or Obers in their tricks, or in Tricks there are one or two with no tricks, 8 beans are divided between these players are (i.e. either 1 player wins all 8 or 2 players each get 4 beans); otherwise the beans are paid to the pot. In quart and lorum the winner is paid; in lorum they also get the contents of the pot. A player who runs out of beans can pay a penny to the pot or another player for another 20 beans (the sale cannot be denied if the other player or the pot has enough beans). The winner is the player with the most beans at the end.

== Three-hand variant ==
If there are only 3 players, the seven and eight of bells are removed and each player is dealt 10 cards. The session is reduced by 3 individual games so that there are 3 x 8=24 games. In lorum itself (contract 8) the two cards removed may be played or laid off whenever they are able to be.

== Literature ==
- Mitteilungen des Nordböhmischen Exkursions-Klubs, vol. 27, Bohemia: Der Klub, 1904
- Parlett, David (2008). The Penguin book of card games. London: Penguin. ISBN 978-0-141-03787-5.
- Riedl, Franz Hieronymus; Steiner, Stefan (1962). Die Ungarndeutschen: Weg einer Volksgruppe. Pannonia-Verlag.
