= Quodlibet (card game) =

Central European card and drinking game

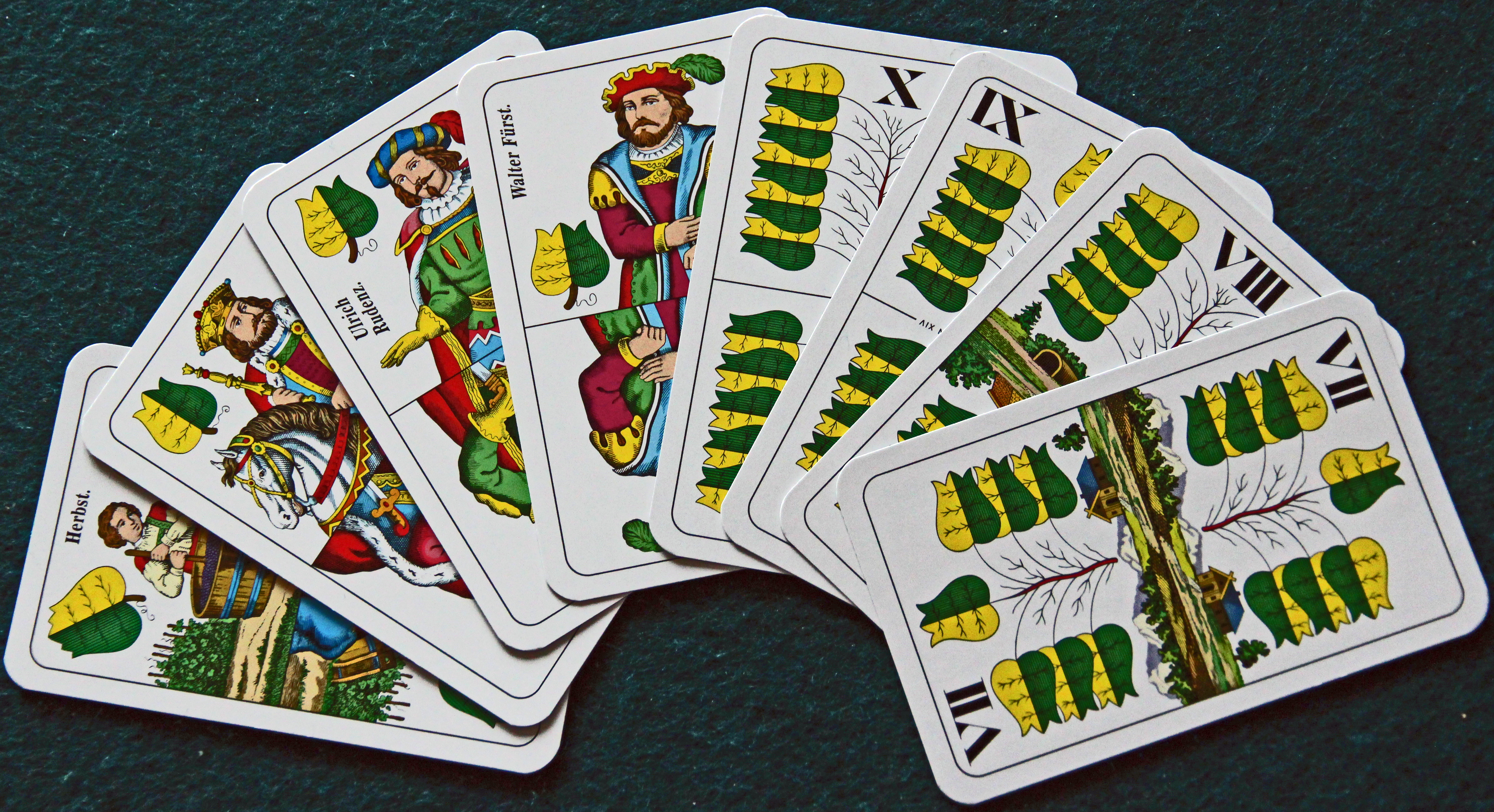
- The suit of Leaves in a William Tell pack
- Origin: Central Europe
- Type: Compendium game
- Players: 4
- Cards: 32
- Deck: William Tell (Double German)
- Rank (high→low): A K O U 10 9 8 7 6
- Play: Anti-clockwise
- Playing time: 2 hours

Related games
- Barbu • Herzeln • Kein Stich • Lorum • Rosbiratschka • Rumpel
- 12 deals x 4 rounds = 48 games.

Quodlibet (Latin: "what you like") is a traditional card game and drinking game associated with central European student fraternities that is played with William Tell pattern cards and in which the dealer is known as the 'beer king'. It is a compendium, trick-taking game for 4 players using a 32-card pack of German-suited playing cards. The Bavarian game of Rumpel is descended from Quodlibet.

== History ==
Quodlibet is an old German student drinking game mentioned as early as 1845 as one of the "best-known drinking games". It is described in at least two 1862 sources as comprising around 20 different deals (Touren) each, in itself, almost childish, but collectively making for an enjoyable variety. These deals included "the well known game of Black Peter, originally a Quodlibet contract, as well as Sequence."

Quodlibet was particularly popular in German student circles and is still played by student fraternities in Austria. In a 400th anniversary magazine for the University of Tübingen that year, students from Mainz describe the rules for Quodlibet. In 1878 a Nuremberg choir song features a pub in which four play Sans Prendre into the night while a quintet plays Schaffkopf or Quodlibet. The well known children's game, Schwarzer Peter (or Old Maid in Britain), was originally a Quodlibet deal.

== Overview ==
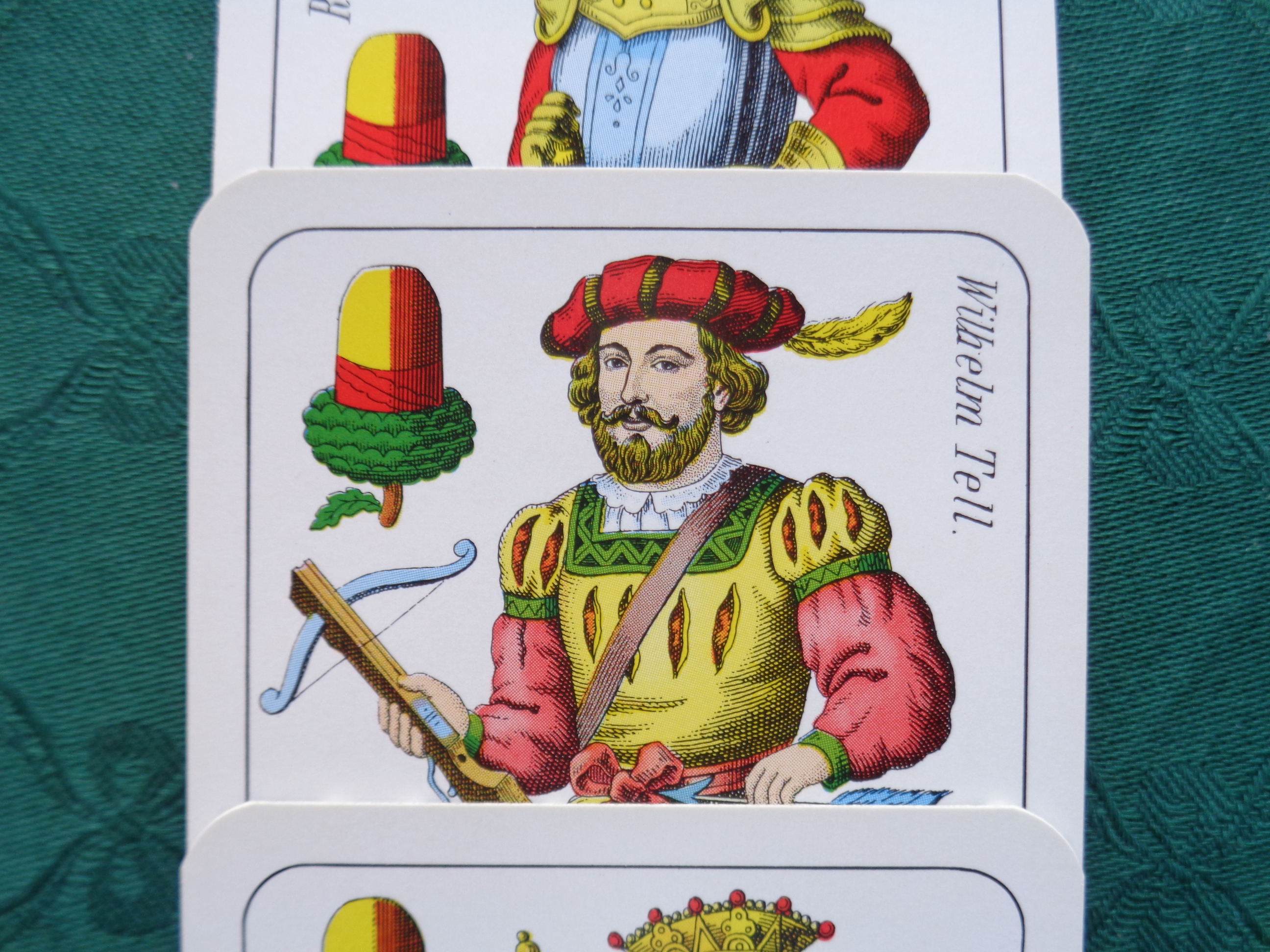
William Tell featured on the Ober of Acorns

Quolibet is a four-hander played with a pack of 32 German-suited cards that is popular with students. In Austria, these are the traditional double-ended William Tell cards.

The rules given here are based on those used by two student fraternities from the Austrian region: KÖStV Frankonia Wien from Vienna, founded in 1919, and KÖStV Badenia from Baden bei Wien in Lower Austria, founded in 1928, both of which are members of the Mittelschüler-Kartellverband, the umbrella organisation for all such high school fraternities in Austria.

A partie in Quodlibet consists of 12 games which, in some circles are divided into three 'wheels' (Rädern) or rounds, each of four deals (Touren). Quodlibet is played anti-clockwise and is a trick-taking game in which players must follow suit (Farbzwang), but there is no trump suit or requirement to win the trick.

The aim is to score as few penalty points as possible.

The dealer in Quodlibet is called the 'beer king' (Bierkönig). The first beer king deals 8 cards to each player (normally 3-3-2 or 3-2-3), picks up his hand, chooses a contract from the first round (see below) and leads to the first trick. When the first deal has been played out, the player to the dealer's right becomes the next beer king; he may now select one of the three remaining contracts and so on.

At the end of each round, the player with the most penalty points becomes the new beer king and may select the first contract. The player with the fewest penalty points at the end of the partie is the winner.

== Playing ==
=== First round ===
The first round (das erste Rad) has the following contracts:

Plus
The aim is to win as many tricks as possible. Every trick that a player does not win scores 10 penalty points; if a player takes no tricks at all, he scores 100 penalty points – this is recorded with the Roman number C.
Minus
The aim is to lose as many tricks as possible. Winning a trick costs 10 points; if a player takes all tricks, it costs 100 points.
Bad Neighbour (Böser Nachbar)
uses the same scoring as Minus, but the penalty points go to the player on the right (or left in another variant).
Alarich
Also called Ahmed and the Red Ruffian (Achmed und der rote Rülps), in this contract the player who takes the 'Red Ruffian', i.e. the King of Hearts, in his tricks, scores 50 penalty points; the player who captures 'Ahmed', i.e. the Ober of Bells, (Note: Perhaps named after the figure on Type I, Prussian pattern cards.) scores 30 penalty points. If a player captures both in one trick, it costs 100 points.

=== Second round ===
The contracts in the second round (das zweite Rad) are:

First Three and Last (Erste drei, letzter)
Also called 1238, pronounced "Twelve Thirty-Eight" (Zwölf Achtunddreißig), or Wall (Mauer). 1238 is the post code of the Viennese quarter of Mauer. Whoever takes the first trick scores 10 points. The second trick is worth 20 points, the third 30 and the last or eighth trick scores 50 (or 80) points.
No Reds
Players aim to take no reds (Keine Roten) i.e. no Hearts cards in their tricks. The 'lower' Hearts (7 to 10) each score 20 points; the 'higher' ones (Unter to Deuce) each 10 points. Taking all Hearts in one trick scores 100 points.
Ober/Unter
Here the aim is to avoid taking any Obers or Unters. Every Ober captured costs 30 points, every Unter 20 points. If a player takes an Ober and an Unter in the same trick, it costs 100 penalty points.
Bribe (Schmiergeld)
Every trick scores 30 points and the player who plays the lowest card to the trick scores 20 points. If a player takes the trick with the lowest card, it costs 100 points.

=== Third round ===
In the third round (das dritte Rad) or Wheel of Fortune (Glücksrad) the beer king must announce his or her chosen contract before dealing.

Open Trousers (Offene Hose)
A negative contract in which the cards are held with their backs to the players, as in Idiotic Skat. For this contract, the requirement to follow suit is, of course, suspended. Each trick scores minus 10; taking all the tricks costs 100 penalty points.
Good Hunting! (Waidmannsheil)
A negative game with open cards. Players lay their cards face up on the table for the duration of the contract and try to take as few tricks as possible. Every trick taken costs 10 penalty points; If a player takes all 8 tricks, it costs 100 points.
Quadrature
Each player is dealt eight cards. A card is only beaten by the card of the same suit that is exactly three ranks higher. This card must be played and not cards that are four or more ranks higher. If someone plays a so-called Quadrature (Quadratur), e.g. an Eight and Unter of the same suit, the other players must play the Nine and Ten of that suit to the trick. Scoring is the same as in Snack below.
Snack (Kleinfraß)
This contract is always played last. It is a variant of Domino. Every player is dealt 4 cards; five packets of 3 cards and a singleton are placed face down on the table. Initially, only the Unters may be played. On an Unter, other cards may be built in the corresponding suit. If a player cannot meld any of his cards, he picks up a packet. Unters have to be played and must not be held back. As soon as the first player has laid all his cards out, he calls "Census!" and the first 'census' (Volkszählung) is held. The remaining players score 10 penalty points for each card still held. The game continues. When the second player is 'out', the next census is taken. Each remaining card now costs 20 points. In the third census, the player who still has hand cards receives 30 penalty points per card and must also count the packets remaining on the table.

== Variations ==
Quodlibet is played in many variations that deviate in their details from the above description. The 1888 Meyers Konversationslexikon describes Quodlibet as "a card game that consists of 13 [sic] different deals that is especially popular in student circles".

== Related games ==
- Herzeln
- Barbu/Tafferan

== Literature ==
- _ (1862), Freiberger Bier-Comment, Engelhardt, Leipzig.
- _ (1862). Lese-Stübchen: Illustrirte Unterhaltungs-Blätter für Familie und Haus, Vol. 3, Brünn.
- Gersdorf, Dr. E.G. (1845). Liepziger Repertorium der deutschen und ausländischen Literatur. Leipzig: Brockhaus.
- Die Rumpler von Hauzenberg. Im Bayerwald wird bis heute ein seltenes Kartenspiel gepflegt, das als Quodlibet in studentischen Zirkeln früher ein echter Renner war. Süddeutsche Zeitung No. 43, 21 February 2009, p. 47.
- Ein "Rumpler" sucht Gleichgesinnte. Hauzenberger Lehrer forscht Ursprüngen eines nahezu unbekannten Kartenspiels nach. In: Passauer Neue Presse, 3 June 2008, p. 10.
- Feist, H. (1880). Erinnerungsblätter an die Sänger-Abende im Nürnberger Singverein, Volume 1, Issues 1-10. Nuremberg: Bieling.
- Kastner, Hugo and Gerald Kador Folkvord (2005). Die große Humboldt-Enzyklopädie der Kartenspiele. Baden-Baden: Humboldt. ISBN 978-3-89994-058-9
- Rodenburg, Julius (1862). Deutsches Magazin: ein illustrirtes Familienbuch, Vol. 1. Berlin: Oswald Seehagen.
- Rost, J. P. (1882). 20 der beliebtesten Rumpelspiele (auch Quodlibet genannt). Nuremberg: C. Flessa.
- Schwarzer, Sebaldus (1845). Cerevisiam bibunt homines! oder die bekanntesten Bierspiele als Cerevis, Schlauch, Quodlibet, Caeco, Bierlicke, Rams und Eilfmännel, deutlich erklärt... Berlin: Schepeler.
