= Herzeln =

Austrian card game

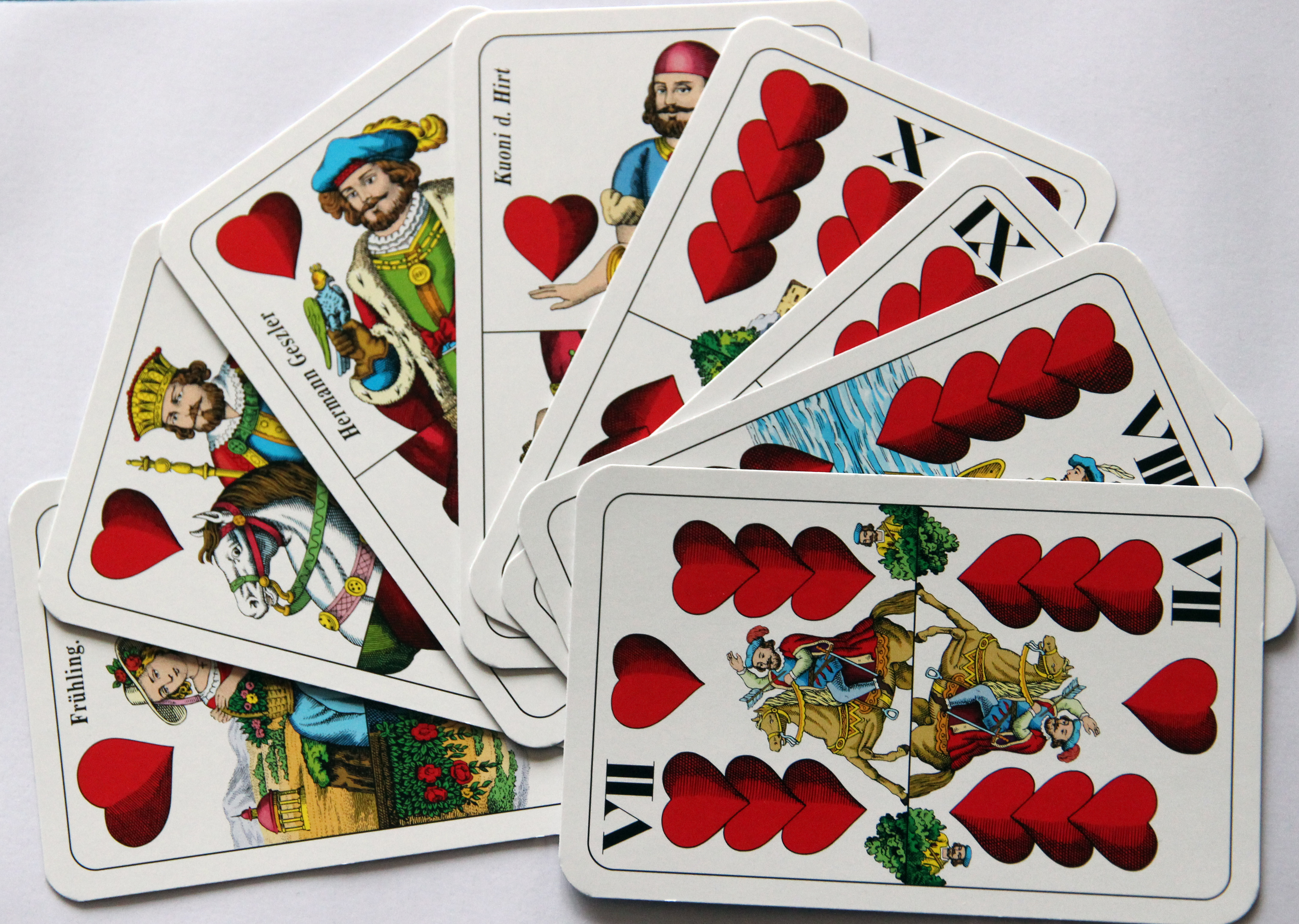
- Suit of Hearts from a William Tell pack
- Origin: Germany
- Type: Compendium game
- Players: 3 or 4
- Cards: 24 or 32
- Deck: French or German "Skat" deck
- Rank (high→low): A 10 K Q J 9 8 7 or A 10 K O U 9 8 7
- Play: Clockwise
- Playing time: 30 minutes

Related games
- Barbu • Kein Stich • Lorum • Quodlibet • Rosbiratschka • Rumpel
- 8 deals x 1 round = 8 games

Herzeln is a compendium card game for three or four players in a partie of eight deals (Touren, cf. Quodlibet). As its name suggests, it is an Austrian game. It should not be confused with other games sometimes called Herzeln, including Barbu and Kein Stich.

== Background ==
The origins of the game are unclear. It was probably derived from other sources because it combines the characteristics of many other well-known games in its various individual deals.

== Rules ==
The following description is based on a rule book by playing card manufacturer Piatnik of Vienna and corresponds to the rules on the AllerKartenspiele website.

=== Cards and ranking ===
In three-hand games a pack of 24 French playing cards is used (i.e. the Eights and Sevens are omitted) and the card ranking is as follows:

Ace (high) – Ten – King – Queen – Jack – Nine (low).

In four-player games, the standard German 32-card pack is used and the card ranking is:

Deuces (high) – Ten – King – Ober – Unter – Nine - Eight - Seven (low).

=== Contracts ===
A partie in Herzeln comprises a series of eight individual hands (Touren), each of which is a separate contract. There is no trump suit; but players must follow suit (Farbzwang). For clarity, the English names of the hands below are based on those used in similar games.

1. No Hearts (Herz). In the first deal, No Hearts, players are penalised for any Hearts in the tricks they win (cf. Black Lady). The following points are deducted: Ace: 11, Ten: 10, King: 4, Queen: 3, Jack, 2, Nine, Eight and Seven: 1 each
2. Tricks (Jeder Stich). In the second deal, players aim to take as many tricks as possible. Each trick taken is worth 10 points.
3. No Tricks (Kein Stich). The third deal is a negative contract: 10 points are deducted for each trick taken.
4. No Obers/Queens (Ober). In the fourth deal each player is penalised 20 points for each Ober/Queen captured.
5. King of Hearts (Herzkönig). In the fifth deal, the player who ends up with the King of Hearts in his tricks is penalised 40 points.
6. Last Trick (Letzter). In the sixth deal only the last trick counts and is worth 40 points to the winner.
7. No Last Trick (Kein Letzter). In the seventh deal, winning the last trick costs 40 minus points.
8. Domino (Unteranlegen). The last deal is a Domino-type game, similar to the Austrian game of Unteransetzen but using French playing cards. It is a melding and shedding game, similar to Sevens: one begins with a Jack, on which, above and below, cards of any suit may be built in rank order. Aces may 'turn the corner' i.e. be placed next to a Seven or Nine to start the sequence again. Whoever is first to meld all their cards is not penalised. The remaining players continue to play; the second to go out gets 10 minus points, the third 20 and the fourth 30.

=== Winning ===
The winner is the one who has the highest score (fewest minus points) at the end of the 8 deals.
