= Barbu (card game) =

Board game

- The Barbu
- Origin: France
- Type: Compendium game
- Players: 4
- Skills: Card counting, Tactics
- Cards: 52
- Deck: French
- Rank (high→low): A K Q J 10 9 8 7 6 5 4 3 2
- Play: Clockwise
- Playing time: 1½ hours face-to-face, 1 hour online
- Chance: Low — Moderate

Related games
- Herzeln • Kein Stich • Lorum • Quodlibet • Rosbiratschka
- 7 deals x 4 rounds = 28 games

Barbu, also known as Tafferan, is a trick-taking, compendium card game similar to hearts, in which four players take turns leading seven different sub-games (known as contracts) over the course of 28 deals. Barbu originated in France in the early 20th century where it was especially popular with university students, and became a prominent game among French bridge players in the 1960s. The French version of the game was originally played with a stripped deck of 32 cards ranked seven to ace in each suit. Modern forms are played with a full 52-card deck. Barbu may be descended from earlier compendium games popular with students and originating in the Austro-Hungarian Empire such as Lorum or Quodlibet.

Barbu literally means 'the bearded [man]', a reference to the common depiction of the king of hearts, which is the only card with a beard. This card is of special significance in one of the seven contracts featured in the game.

== Rules ==
=== Preliminaries ===
Four players (no partnerships) use a deck of 52 French suited cards (♠ ♥ ♣ ♦) ranking A (high) K Q J 10 9 8 7 6 5 4 3 2 (low). There are 28 deals in a game and each player deals seven times in succession, the deal passing to the left. Players draw for high card to determine who will be the first dealer. The dealer is automatically also the declarer. He shuffles the cards, offers them to the right for cutting and then deals 13 cards to each player. He then names which contract all will play for that deal. The declarer names each contract once only. After having played all seven contracts, the roles of dealer and declarer pass to the left for the next seven hands, and so on, until all have done their seven contracts.

=== Contracts ===
There are five negative and two positive contracts and all are trick-taking games with the exception of domino. For trick-taking contracts, declarer leads a card to the opening trick and play passes clockwise with each player following suit if able, or otherwise playing a card in a different suit. All contracts are played at no trump, with the exception of trumps. The total scores for all seven contracts taken together add up to zero, although variations exist where this is not the case. The seven contracts are:

- No tricks (also known as misere or nullo). Each trick taken scores −2 points for a total of −26.
- No hearts. The ace of hearts scores −6 and each of the other hearts score −2 for a total of −30. Hearts may never be led unless there are no cards of other suits available to lead. All hearts are kept face up after capture so that everybody can see who has taken which.
- No queens. Each queen scores −6 for a total of −24 and queens are left face up after capture. The hand ends once all four queens have been taken.
- No king of hearts (Barbu). K♥ scores −20, and hearts may not be led as in the no-hearts contract above. Play ends once the king has been taken.
- No last two. The second-to-last trick scores −10 and the last trick scores −20 for −30 points.
- Trumps. Declarer chooses trumps and leads to the first trick. If a trump is led, each player must, if able, play a higher trump than those played before. Otherwise players follow suit, or discard if they are void in trumps. If a plain suit is led, players follow suit if possible. If they cannot and no trump has been played, they must play a trump card if possible or otherwise play a card of one of the other suits. If a non-trump has been led and trumped, a player must, if possible, play a higher trump than those previously played. Otherwise the player may slough off any card. Each trick scores +5 points for +65 total.
- Domino.
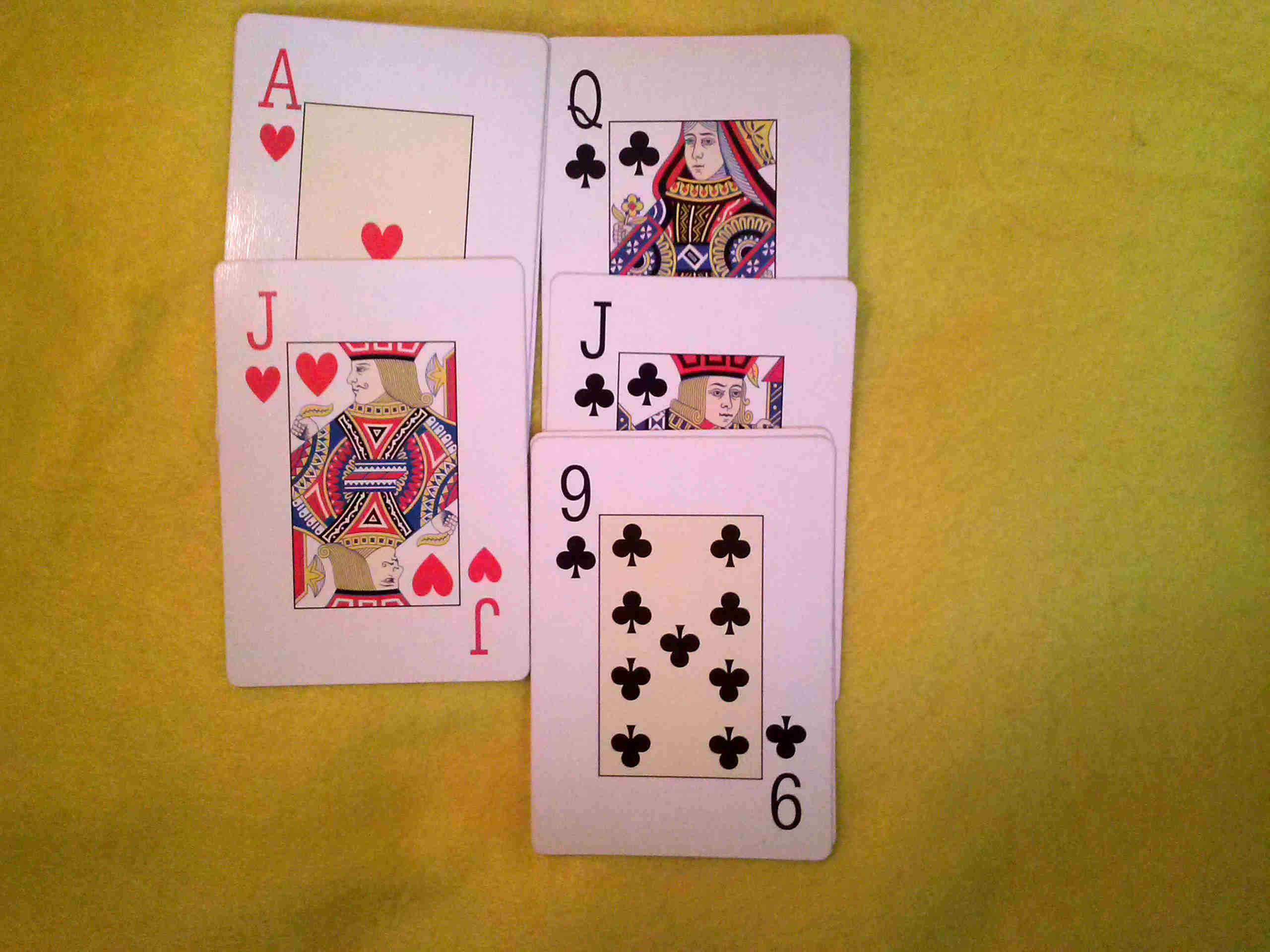
  A domino in process.
  Declarer chooses a starting rank (which he need not have) and announces "Domino from the [rank]." Each player in turn must play any card of the chosen rank or cards one higher or lower in rank than those on the table. Failing that, a player must pass. The aim is to be first to shed all of one's cards. The layout of the Domino is thus built from a column of the four starting cards that sequence outward to one or both sides. Play continues until all cards have been laid out onto the table. First to go out scores +45, second scores +20, third +5 and last −5, for +65 total.

=== Doubling ===
After declarer picks a game but before the first trick is led, each of the other players may wager double against one or more of the other players. This operates like a side bet on the relative game score between the two players, who are said to have "business" with each other. The rules for doubling are:

- Each player gets one opportunity to double, starting with the player at the dealer's left
- A player must name which of the other players he or she wishes to double, or say "maximum" or "table" to double all of the players, or "family" or "flanks" to double the other two non-dealers.
- At a positive game, non-dealers may only double the dealer (who may redouble)
- Each non-declarer must double against declarer at least twice during a declarer's seven contracts.
- Any player receiving a wager of double may redouble; "maximum" implies redoubling all received wagers as well as doubling the remaining players
- Declarer can not double, but may redouble as above. A "maximum" from the dealer therefore redoubles received wagers only

If there are no doubles in a negative game, the game is not played out, but the negative points are simply divided equally between the non-dealers, with the dealer scoring 0 or +1 as necessary. After the hand is played out and scores are tallied, modifications are made for doubles as follows:

- Between each pair of players who doubled, the difference in their scores is calculated. Player with the higher score for that round is awarded the amount of the difference and player with the lower score had the same amount subtracted from his or her score.
- Redoubled wagers are figured the same way, with the difference in scores doubled before awards and penalties are tallied.

=== Game ===
Once all 28 hands have been played, scores are tallied and the player with the greatest number of points wins. The scores of all players should add up to zero, though variations exist where this is not the case (see below).

== Variations ==
=== Additional contracts ===
Ravage city

Ravage city is an eighth contract (resulting in a game of 32 deals) where the player who takes the most cards in any one suit scores −24. If two tie, each scores −12. If three tie, each scores −8, and all get −6 for a four-way tie. To maintain zero-sum scoring, the values of the other contracts are modified as follows:

- No tricks: each trick scores −3 (−39 total)
- No hearts: no change – A♥ scores −6, all other ♥s score −2 each (−30 total)
- No queens: each queen scores −8 (−32 total)
- No king: K♥ scores −21
- No Last Two: no change – penultimate trick scores −10, ultimate trick scores −20 (−30 total)
- Trumps: each trick scores +7 (+91 total)
- Domino: first player out scores +50, second +25, third 10 and last scores 0 (+85 total)

Otherwise all is as in the seven contract version.

Some play ravage city at −36 instead of −24. This does not maintain the zero-sum scoring.

Chinese poker

Chinese poker (chipoker) is a ninth contract (making 36 deals) played and scored as a hand of Chinese poker. The scores are then multiplied by four, for 76 plus points. Played with ravage city and all other deals, chipoker adds 52 positive points into the game. All the negative games may be slightly adjusted to balance out the games and make the total scores add up to 0.

Salade

Salade is an additional round played in a variant based on the negative rounds. In this game the five negative rounds are varied slightly as follows, and the salade is a sixth round.

- No tricks: Each trick scores −5 (total −65 with 4 players)
- No last trick: −30 total (note, just last trick)
- No hearts: All hearts score −10 (−130 total)
- No queens: Each queen scores −20 (−80 total)
- No Barbu: K♥ scores −50
- Salade: all of the above, simultaneously (−355 total with 4 players)

Games are multiples of six rounds, with strategy for salade being critical. This variant is strictly for fun – for example, players will gang up on the leader going into the salade, forgetting their own position. It allows other numbers of participants to play by adjusting the pack (e.g., five players can be accommodated by removing the black 2s from the pack, leaving 50 cards).

=== Quick rotation Barbu ===
Quick Rotation Barbu is a variation of Barbu that emerged organically from adaptations made throughout the 1970s and the 1980s for home gaming tables and informal Bridge tournaments, as a response to players claiming the rhythm within the classic version was too slow to be playable.

Quick Rotation Barbu is a game played individually by 4 players with a standard 52-card deck (being Ace the highest and 2 the lowest) and every game must consist of exactly 28 rounds. Each new round the deck passes to the player on the left. The one who receives the deck shall become the Dealer and Declarer for that round. He shall deals 13 cards to each person and chooses which contract will be played. The only restriction is that: each of the players must choose each of the 7 contracts only once throughout the entire game.

- The 7 Contracts: There are 5 negative contracts (were taking cards may result in a loss of points) and 2 positive contracts (were taking cards may result in a gain of points):
  1. No Tricks: each trick scores -2 points (total -26 within each player).
  2. No Hearts: each heart scores -2 points (the Ace of Hearts costs -6).
  3. No Queens: each queen scores -6 points.
  4. No King of Hearts (or Barbu/The Bearded One): The one who captures the King of Hearts may score -20 points (the highest you can loose, in the game, within a single card).
  5. No Last Two: by winning the last two tricks of the round (the 12th and the 13th ones) the player may score -10 points.
  6. Trumps: The Declarer may choose a dominant suit (like sword for example). Each trick scores +5 points.
  7. Dominos/The Fantan: There are no tricks. The Dealer plays a card, and subsequent players must either continue the sequence (higher or lower) in the same suit or start a new suit with a card of the same rank. The first player to empty their hands scores +45, the second player scores +20, the third player scores +5, and the last player scores 0 (nothing).
- Round and Betting Mechanics:
  1. Start: The player to the left of the Dealer begins by playing the card. Everyone at the table must follow the suit if they have a card of that suit. If a player does not have one, the player may discard any card.
  2. The Trick: The highest card of the suit that was led wins the trick and collects all the cards. The winner of the trick leads the next one.
  3. Doubling (Optional): Before the first card is played, players may "double" their opponents, wagering that they will perform better than them in the round. In Quick Rotation, to keep the game balanced, every player is required to double the current dealer at least twice over the course of the 28 rounds.

At the end of all rounds, the negative and positive scores perfectly cancel each other out (the table balance is zero), and whoever has accumulated the highest total score is the overall winner.

== Marketed variations ==
Many game manufacturers have published boxed games based on Barbu. These include:

- Parker Brothers's 6-contract game Coup d'Etat (1966) using a 32-card deck and scoreboard with tiny plastic swords;
- Milton Bradley's fantasy-themed Dragonmaster (1981) that keeps score with colored plastic jewels;
- Guillotine (1983), a Barbu derivative that was designed to have more challenging scoring;
- IELLO's modernized thematic trick-taking game The Dwarf King (2011), whose structure relies completely on the Barbu contract-picking mechanic;
- CardSen$e, which makes the use of the standard deck and four more subgames (Queen of Spades, Last 2, Tricks and FanTan).

== See also ==
- Hearts
- Trex (card game)
