= Catch the ten =

Card game

- Origin: Scotland
- Type: Trick-taking
- Players: 2-8
- Cards: 36
- Deck: French
- Rank (high→low): trumps: J A K Q 10 9 8 7 6 rest: A K Q J 10 9 8 7 6
- Play: Clockwise
- Playing time: 15 min

Related games
- Solo whist

Catch the ten, also called Scots whist or Scotch whist, is an 18th-century point-trick ace–ten card game that is recorded as being played only in Scotland, although evidence suggests a possible German origin. Unlike standard whist, it is played with a pack of only 36 cards, the fives and below being omitted. In the trump suit, the jack is the highest card. Despite its alternative name, it has nothing to do with standard whist.

== History ==
The 36-card pack and ace–ten scoring scheme with tens low suggest a certain antiquity and German origins, but the game is first recorded in a farce by James Stewart in 1779, where one of the Scottish students in a tavern suggests "we have a game, at catch the ten", noting that there are "just Six o'us". It was clearly well known in early 19th century Scotland, particularly in Edinburgh, the 1830 Hoyle Made Familiar confirming that it is said to be a "favourite game in Edinburgh and other parts of Scotland, though, we believe it is not much known in the sister kingdom." In 1824, The Scottish Gallovidian Encyclopedia notes that the chief Galloway card games are Catch the Ten or Catch Honours, Lent for Beans, Brag, Pairs for Slaes, Beggar my Neebour, Birkie, Love after Supper and Wha to be married first. In addition to these "rustic" games, whist and Cribbage had recently been introduced, but Catch the Ten remained that "auld, harmless favourite". A Scottish Dictionary also gives the name as catch the lang tens, and an English dialect dictionary records it as catch the long tens or catch-honours. (Note: "Tens" suggests that one or more non-trump 10s were also counters.)

The game was played at Christmas among the middle classes in Edinburgh in 1800, but by the 1820s it was "the nightly resource of retired coal skippers and independent fish women." Its first rules were published in 1830 in Edinburgh under the name catch the ten with "Scots whist" and "Scotch whist" as alternatives. Its rules continue to be published today, sometimes under the name Scotch whist, (Note: For example, in the Card Games Bible (2014), pp. 150–151.) although whether the game is still played is unknown.

== Rules ==
The following rules are based on Trebor, but have not changed since with the exception of the minor variations and clarifications noted. The ace–ten scheme only applies to the trump suit; the side suits have no counters..

=== Overview ===
Any number from two to eight people may play. If an odd number play, each plays alone; if four, six or eight play, they form two teams with the players from each team sitting alternately. Alternatively, if six play, they may form three teams of two.

The Card Games Bible (2014) also allows four, six or eight players to play on their own. The New Complete Hoyle (1991) states that four players are best.

A 36-card, French-suited pack is used, the 2s, 3s, 4s and 5s being removed from a standard pack. Cards rank as in whist, with the exception of the trump suit where the jack is the highest card.

=== Object ===
The aim of the game is to score the most points by winning tricks and taking the top five trumps. Each card taken above the party's share scores one point and the trumps score as follows:

- Jack = 11
- Ace = 4
- King = 3
- Queen = 2
- Ten = 10
- Remainder = 0

Thus there are 30 card points. Example: in a four-player game, each person's share of the 36 cards is 9. If spades are trumps and Angus and Isla take 8 tricks between them they have 32 cards and their share is 2 x 9 = 18. Thus they score = 32 - 18 = 14 towards game. If, in addition, Angus has the ♠J and Isla has ♠A, so they score an additional 11 + 4 = 15 points, making a total of 29 points. In the next hand they take the first two tricks with the ten and queen of trumps, holding up the jack, ace, and king. This gives them a further 12 card points making a total of 41, which is game. Thus they win without the need for further play.

=== Deal and play ===
The cards are cut and then dealt clockwise, beginning with eldest hand, and either singly or three at a time, the last card being turned for trump. If two play, each player is dealt three hands of 6 cards. If three play, each receives a hand of 6 cards. If four play, they each receive 9 cards; if five play, the ♠6 is removed from the pack and each player is dealt 7 cards; if six play they receive 6 cards each; if seven play, the ♠6 is removed and they are dealt 5 cards each; and if eight play, the four 6s are removed and they are dealt 4 each. (Note: Trebor states that, if necessary, one or two sixes are removed in order to divide the cards equally, but otherwise does not clarify the deal for four or more players, leaving subsequent authors to fill in the detail.)

Eldest hand leads to the first trick with any card. The hands are played in the order dealt e.g. if two play, they play their three hands alternately and in the order dealt. The game follows whist rules of play i.e. players must follow suit if able, but may play any card if unable to follow. The trick is won by the highest trump or by the highest card of the led suit if no trumps are played. The trick winner leads to the next trick. (Note: Trebor simply says that the "mode of playing" is "the same as at whist.")

The penalty for a revoke (breaking a rule such as failing to follow suit when able) is the loss of the game. The New Complete Hoyle (1991) suggests a better penalty is the loss of all points in the current deal, the opponents scoring all they have made.

In partnership games, the tricks are kept in a common pile for each team.

=== Winning ===
Forty-one is game and may be achieved in the middle of a hand.

=== Tactics ===
The "grand object" is to "catch the ten" of trumps or prevent it being caught by an adversary. The only safe way of saving or 'passing' the ten is to play it to a round of trumps when your partner has played the best trump or, if you are the last player and cannot follow suit, to trump the trick with the 10. More often, a risk has to be taken by trumping a side suit even when you are not the last to play.

== Related games ==
=== French whist ===
In 1885, William Brisbane Dick briefly describes a game called French whist, which he claims is a "variety of catch the ten" adding that the ♦10 is only a trump if diamonds are trumps and that the tricks count the same as at whist i.e. 1 point per trick. However, in an earlier publication he described similar rules as a variant of "regular whist". R.F. Foster and other authors down to David Parlett follow Dick's later premise, even though Dick appears to have been in error. (Note: For example, see Foster (1997), p. 127 or Parlett (2008), p. 248.) It may be related to Matzlfangen.

== Zehnerfangen ==
A card game called Zehnerfangen or Zehner-Fangen ("catching tens") is recorded in Austria and Bavaria in the mid-19th century, but no details of play are given. It may be related to Matzlfangen which also means "Catching Tens".

== In culture ==
Scottish author, John MacTaggart, records the following poem about the game:

Sang o' the Cartes

Come deal the carts, spit on your thoum,
And fling as roun' a han;
Their cutten Jock, and shuffled too,
Sax players are the plan.

Now, what's the cut? The Jack, by jing;
O, if they hae the Ten,
The game we lose, tho' in dirt's hold
We be, as a' do ken.

Come, let na Johnie get the lead,
O trumpf about they go;
'Twas shameless Tam, ha sma' anes haith,
The Ten - the Ten, no, no.

Now, Clubs they lead - the first time roun,
That's a renunce fu' clean;
Down goes the Ten – 'twill run, 'twill run,
No, down on't sweeps the Queen.

Ten and eleven is twenty-one,
The Queen, anither twa;
O! there's the Ace – it gets the King;
We're beat–we're cowl'd, and a'.

== See also ==
- Beggar-my-neighbour
- One-card

== Bibliography ==
- _ (2014). The Card Games Bible. London: Hamlyn.
- Das Comité (1870). "Große 66 Partie" in Fürther Tagblatt (1870), p. 3.
- Dick, William Brisbane (1885). The American Hoyle. NY: Dick & Fitzgerald.
- Foster, R.F. (1897). Foster's Complete Hoyle. 3rd edn. London, NY: Frederick A. Stokes.
- Jamieson, John (1825). Supplement to the Etymological Dictionary of the Scottish Language. 2nd edn. Vol. 1. Edinburgh: W. & C. Tait.
- MacTaggart, John (1824). The Scottish Gallovidian Encyclopedia. London: Morrison.
- Parlett, David (1990). The Oxford Guide to Card Games, Oxford, NY: OUP
- Parlett, David (2008). The Penguin Book of Card Games, London: Penguin. ISBN 978-0-141-03787-5
- Seidenbusch, Christian (1866), "Sport und Spiel" in Ein Sträußchen komischer Vorträge by Ch. T. Seidenbusch. Vol. 14, Freising: Fran Paul Datterer. pp. 16 ff.
- Stewart, James (1779). The Students, or The Humours of St. Andrews A Farce. London: W. Nicoll.
- Trebor, Eidrah [Robert Hardie] (1830). Hoyle Made Familiar. Edinburgh: Stirling & Kenney.
- "Trumps", pseud. for William Brisbane Dick (1864). The American Hoyle. NY: Dick & Fitzgerald.
- T.Y. (1821). "Letters from Edinburgh. No. III." in The London Magazine, Vol. 4. July–December. London: Taylor & Hessey.
- Wright, J. (1898). The English Dialect Dictionary, Vol. I (A–C). London: Hy Frowde; NY: Putnam.
