= Hugh McMillan (poet) =

Scottish writer

Hugh McMillan (born 1955) is a Scottish poet and short story writer.

== Background ==
McMillan taught at Annan Academy then taught history in Dumfries Academy until he retired in 2013. He lives in Penpont.

His pamphlet 'Postcards from the Hedge' was a winner of the Callum Macdonald Prize (2009), a prize he won again with another Roncadora pamphlet, 'Sheep Penned' in 2017, being made in consequence the Michael Marks Poet in Residence for the Harvard Summer School in Napflio, Greece. He was also a winner in the Smith Doorstep Poetry Prize and the Cardiff International Poetry Competition. His work 'Devorgilla's Bridge' was shortlisted for the Michael Marks Award and in 2015 he was shortlisted for the Basil Bunting Poetry Award. He has received several bursaries from the Scottish Arts Council and Creative Scotland. In 2014 he was awarded the very first literature commission by the Wigtown Book Festival to create a work inspired by the 19th century work The Scottish Gallovidian Encyclopedia by John Mactaggart. 'McMillan's Galloway', the result of this work, was published in limited edition in 2014, and a revised edition published by Luath in 2015. His Selected and New Poems, 'Not Actually being in Dumfries' was published by Luath in 2015. His poetry has been anthologized and broadcast widely and he has read in events and poetry festivals worldwide. In 2020 he was appointed a 'Poetry Champion' by the Scottish Poetry Library to commission new work for their platforms. In 2021 he edited ‘Best Scottish Poems’, the Scottish Poetry Library's prestigious annual anthology. In 2021 he was also appointed a judge for the Saltire Poetry Prize.

== Works ==
His poetry collections include Thin Slice of Moon, (Roncadora 2013), The Lost Garden (Roncadora 2010), Strange Bamboo (Shoestring 2006) Aphrodite's Anorak (Peterloo, 1996), After A Storm (Smith/Doorstep, 2005),Horridge(Chapman, 1990), Tramontana (Dog and Bone, 1989). His other work includes a schools History book, Standard Grade History: International Relations 1890-1930 (Hodder and Stoughton), two children's books, Mac the Rabbit and Mac and the Lost Tribe (King's England Press), and a book about the history of Dumfries. His work commissioned by the Wigtown Book Festival, 'McMillan's Galloway', was published by Luath in 2015 as was his Selected and New Poems, 'Not Actually being in Dumfries', also by Luath Press. Subsequent poetry collections from Luath have been 'Heliopolis' and The Conversation of Sheep' in 2018 and ‘Whit If’ and ‘Haphazardly in the Starless Night’ in 2020.
