= Birkie =

Scottish card game

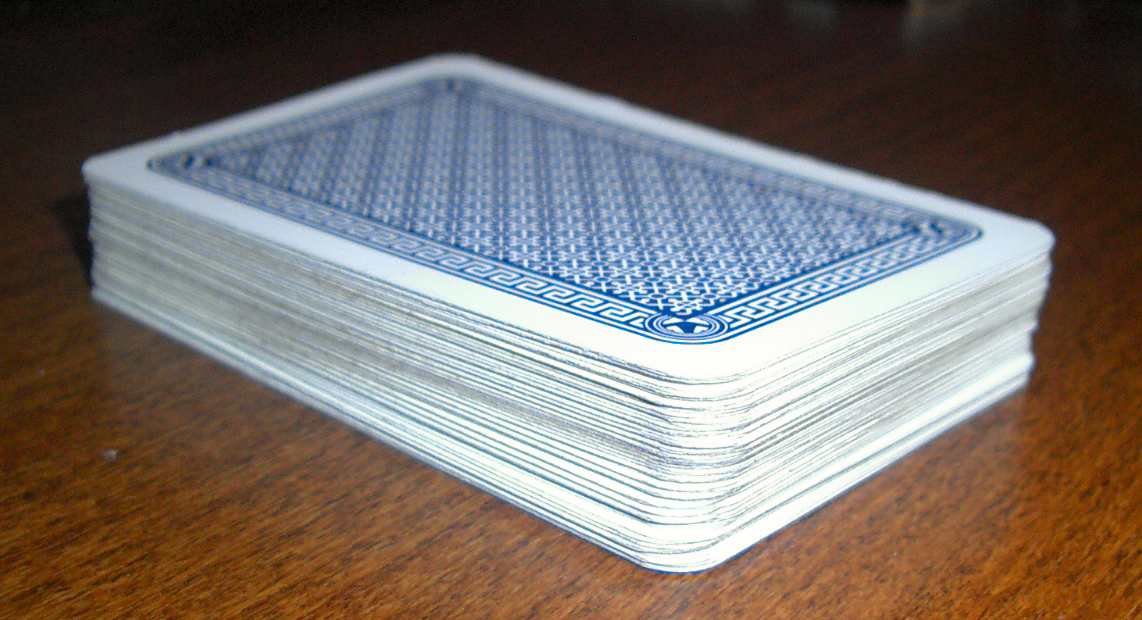
- Alternative names: Birky
- Type: Adding-up-type
- Players: 2
- Skills: Observation, quick reactions
- Cards: 52
- Deck: French-suited
- Rank (high→low): Assumed natural ranking, Aces low
- Play: Alternate
- Chance: High

Related games
- Beggar my Neighbour • Battle

Birkie or Birky is an historical Scottish west coast card game for two players that is first recorded by Sir Walter Scott in 1819. It has been equated to Beggar my Neighbour, however, its rules are different.

== History ==
Birkie is first recorded in Scott's Bride of Lammermoor in 1819 where he writes "But Bucklaw cared no more about riding the first horse and that sort of thing, than he, Craigengelt, did about a game at birkie."

In 1820, John Galt alludes to the game in his Ayrshire Legatees thus: "It was an understood thing that not only Whist and Catch-Honours were to be played, but even obstreperous Birky itself for the diversion of such of the company as were not used to gambling games."

In 1824, Birkie is listed as one of the most popular card games in Galloway alongside "catch the ten, or catch honours, lent for beans, brag and pairs for slaes, (Note: "Pairs" may be the "Pair" element of Post and Pair. "Slaes" is Scottish for "sloes" and may refer to playing with or for sloes.) Beggar my Neebour... Love after Supper, and Wha to be married first." They are described as "rustic games", unlike "Whist, Cribbage and other genteel nonsense."

Although recorded initially in the west coast regions of Ayrshire and Galloway, by the 1850s it appears the game had reached Glasgow, being played by print workers alongside catch the ten and all fours.

Jamieson derives the name 'birkie' from the Icelandic berk-ia, to boast.

== Rules ==
The only description of the rules are two brief accounts by John Jamieson in his dictionaries of the Scottish language. The first runs as follows:

BIRKIE, BIRKY, s[ubstantive]. A childish game at cards, in which the players throw down a card alternately. Only two play; and the person who throws down the highest takes up the trick, S[cotland]. In England it is called Beggar-my-neighbour. Of this game there are said to be two kinds, King's Birkie and Common Birkie. From the Islandic berk-ia to boast; because the one rivals his antagonist with his card.

Later editions change "childish" to "trifling" and add that "he who follows suit [with a higher card] wins the trick, if he seizes the heap before his opponent can cover his card with one of his own".

Despite its equation to the English game of Beggar my Neighbour, it is different because a) it is listed separately by John Mactaggart; b) no pay cards (A K Q J) are mentioned i.e. cards which, when played, require the opponent to play a specified number of further cards which, if all are numerals, are captured by the player of the pay card; and c) there is a requirement to follow suit, unlike Beggar my Neighbour. However, the aim is similar: to win by acquiring all the cards. It may be that the above rules describe common birkie and that, in king's birkie, the king was perhaps the highest card and also a pay card.

== Bibliography ==
- Galt, John (1820). Ayrshire Legatees, London: Blackwood.
- Jamieson, John (1825). Etymological Dictionary of the Scottish Language, Vol. I. Edinburgh: W & C Tait.
- Jamieson, John (1846). A Dictionary of the Scottish Language. Abridged by John Johnstone. Edinburgh: William Tait.
- Mactaggart, John (1824). The Scottish Gallovidian Encyclopedia. London: Morrison.
- Thomson, Alexander (1895). Random Notes and Rambling Recollections of Drydock, the Dock, Or Kelvindock. Glasgow: Kerr & Richardson.
- Scott, Sir Walter (1819). Bride of Lammermoor. London: Constable.
