= Schlauch =

Schlauch is German for "hose" or "pipe" and may refer to:

Surnames.

Notable people with the surname include:

- Heinz Schlauch (1915–1945), German swimmer who competed in the 1936 Summer Olympics
- Margaret Schlauch (1898–1986), scholar of medieval studies at New York University

Other meanings.

- Schlauch (card game), an historical Bavarian card game
