= French whist =

Card game

French whist is any of three different card games: whist as played in 19th century Paris; a variant of standard whist; and a purported variant of Scotch whist or catch the ten. It should not be confused with the term "French whist" when employed to refer to historical, cultural and ludemic aspects of whist as played in France.

== Parisian whist ==
In 1849, Reuben Roy describes a game he calls "French whist" as "played in the fashionable circles of the French capital". This varied from his description of the English game in that it had a preference suit called the favourite. The preference suit was the first trump suit of the game; on this and every subsequent occasion that it became the trump suit, it doubled the points value of three honours from 2 to 4 points; of four honours from 4 to 8 and of each trick from 1 to 2 points. One impact of this was that a rubber could be won in 2 deals. Game was 10 points and any surplus points, known as the enfilade were carried forward to the next game. Thus a team could win or lose in one deal if the favourite were combined with the enfilade.

== English whist variant ==
The rules of another game called French whist are first outlined by American author William Brisbane Dick in 1864 where he describes it as a version of "regular" whist, except that game is 40, not 10, the honours count to those who win them (as in catch the ten) and not to those who are dealt them, and the ♦10 is worth 10 points. No other card points are mentioned. It is presumably played by four players in partnership with 52 cards and the honours probably score, as in whist, four points if the A, K, Q and J of trumps are won, three if any 3 are taken and nothing otherwise. The tricks count the same as at whist i.e. 1 point per trick.

== Scots whist variant ==
In 1885, however, Dick confusingly calls French whist a "variety of catch the ten", the game also called Scots whist. The rules are the same as those of 1864, except to clarify that the ♦10 is only a trump if diamonds are trumps and that the tricks count the same as at whist i.e. 1 point per trick. R.F. Foster and other authors down to David Parlett follow Dick's later premise that French Whist is a variant of catch the ten, even though there are significant differences. (Note: For example, see Foster (1997), p. 127, Butler (1998), p. 190, or Parlett (2008), p. 248.) For example, the number of players in whist is fixed at four, whereas in catch the ten, two to eight may play. In whist there are 52 cards, not 36, there are no card points and the trump jack is not the top card. Butler's account is even contradictory, first stating that French whist is a variety of Scotch whist in which the main difference is that it is the ♦10 and not the trump 10 that is sought after, and that, second, French whist is a variety of catch the ten that is played like English whist with the exceptions named by Dick in 1864 and, finally stating that Scotch whist is the same as catch-the-ten before going on to describe the rules very much in line with Trebor and stating that the game "had no more resemblance to whist than the Scotch fiddle to a violin". David Parlett's 2008 account compares French whist to catch the ten directly, saying that the only differences are that it is played with 52 cards, that the ♦10 scores 10 points instead of the trump 10 and that game is 40 points. As described, this is different from the earlier version introduced by Dick.

== Bibliography ==
- Dick, William Brisbane (1885). The American Hoyle. NY: Dick & Fitzgerald.
- Butler, William Mill (1898). The Whist Reference Manual. Philadelphia: Yorston.
- Foster, R.F. (1897). Foster's Complete Hoyle. 3rd edn. London, NY: Frederick A. Stokes.
- Parlett, David (2008). The Penguin Book of Card Games, Penguin, London. ISBN 978-0-141-03787-5
- Roy, Reuben (1849). The Bridgwater Treatise on Whist. London: Henry Kent Causton.
- Trebor, Eidrah [Robert Hardie] (1830). Hoyle Made Familiar. Edinburgh: Stirling & Kenney.
- "Trumps", pseud. for William Brisbane Dick (1864). The American Hoyle. NY: Dick & Fitzgerald.
