= Schinderhansen =

Schinderhansen may refer to:

- Schinderhannes, the notorious German highwayman
- Schinderhansen (card game), German card game named after the highwayman
