= Rumpel =

Card game

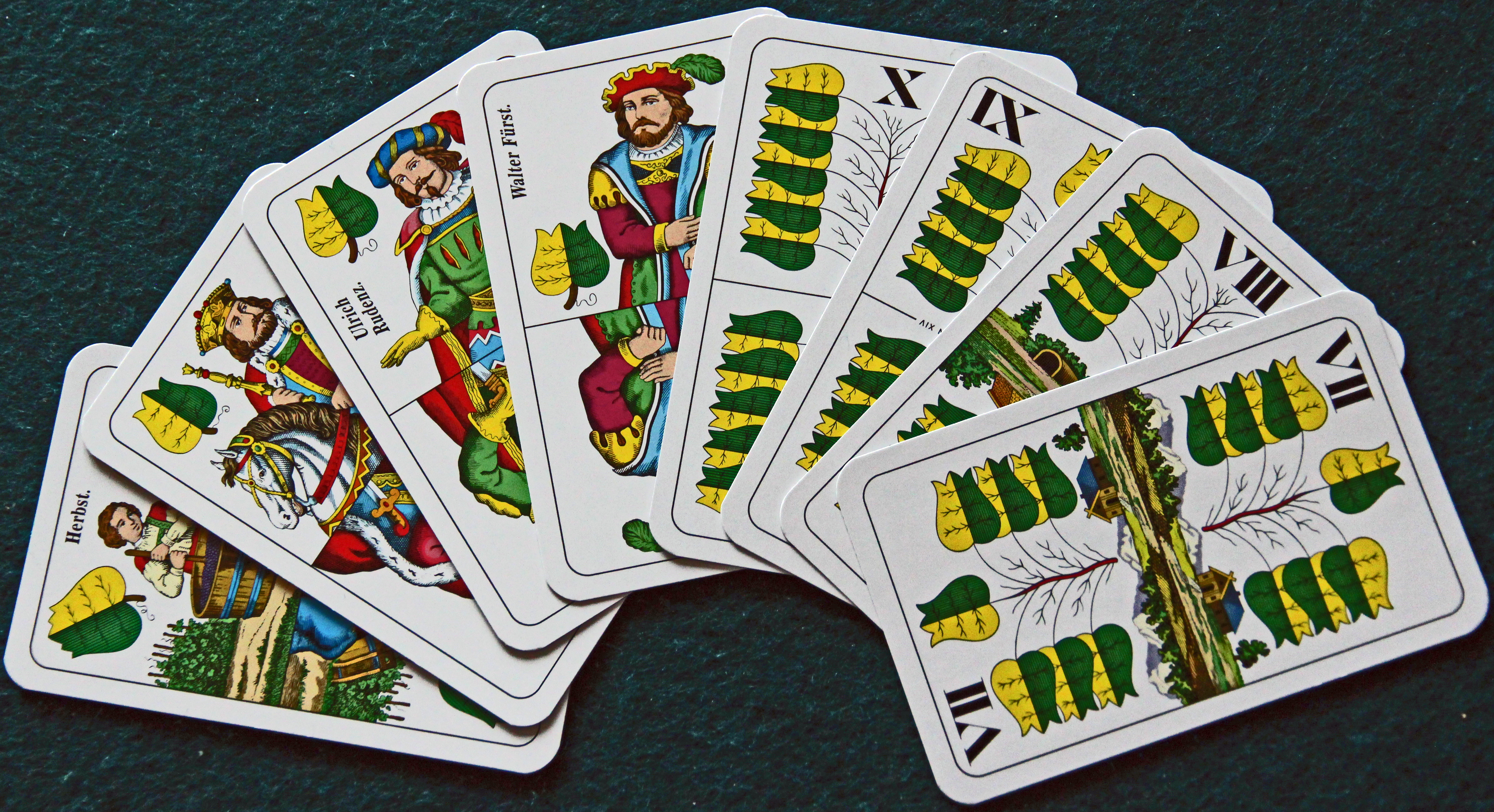
- The suit of Leaves in a William Tell pattern German-suited pack
- Origin: Central Europe
- Type: Plain-trick
- Players: 4 (-9)
- Cards: 32
- Deck: William Tell (Double German)
- Rank (high→low): A K O U 10 9 8 7
- Play: Anti-clockwise
- Playing time: 2 hours

Related games
- Quodlibet

Rumpel is a card game, that is native to the Danube region from Regensburg to Linz, but is played especially in the region of Hauzenberg in the German county of Passau in Bavaria. Mala describes a version with 8 or 12 contracts from a menu of 29 called Großer Rumpel. It is a descendant of the old Austrian student's game of Quodlibet.

== History ==
Rumpelspiel is an old German word – Martin Luther describes the world as the Teufels Rumpelspiel or "devil's playground" – but it is not clear when it attached itself to a card game. The earliest definite record is a diary entry for 5 May 1715 when a citizen of Augsburg recorded that he had drunk 3 litres of beer and eaten 2 rolls and a sausage at a cost of 12 kreuzer and 2 heller; and lost 59 kreuzer and 2 heller playing Rumpelspiel.

A very similar game, Quodlibet, has been played since at least 1845, particularly in student circles as a drinking game. In a 400th anniversary magazine for the University of Tübingen that year, students from Mainz describe the rules for Quodlibet. Mala states that Rumpel is a relic of the Ottoman Wars. Rumpel was apparently being played in Erlangen as early as the 1850s because it is mentioned as one of the games, along with Tarock and Skat, that had "long since superseded Schlauch" around that time.

In 1882, Rost published a treatise on Rumpel, equating it with Quodlibet, and listing twenty contracts from which typically the first ten plus one or two from the second ten were actually played. Writing in Nuremberg, Bavaria, he says that the game "has had a great reception in all social circles."

In 1890, we read of a Rumpel competition taking place in a pub in Griesbach near Passau, alongside the game of Grasobern. There were prizes: one each for apparently different games or contracts, known as Naturrumpeln, Generalquarte and Mach-Rumpeln, as well as for the most and fewest Stangen (marks) and for each team which finished first.

However, as a student game, Rumpel was introduced to Hauzenberg in the 1970s by teacher, Karl Rothdauscher, who worked there for 31 years. The name of the game in Hauzenberg is derived from the special contract of Rumpel. A game of Rumpel consists of a sequence of eight individual contracts. In special cases there are also the special contracts of Quart and even Rumpel.

== Rules ==
=== Aim ===
The aim of Rumpel is to score as few penalty points as possible.

=== Rumpel (1882) ===
Rost says that Rumpel or Quodlibet comprises twenty contracts, but there are numerous options to choose from and he has only listed the twenty most common. In most cases only his first ten are used, but sometimes a contract from his second series is swapped for one in the first series. His rules assume some prior knowledge. Nevertheless we are told that there are always four active players and up to seven may participate. A 32-card German-suited pack is used. Except where stated, players are dealt 8 cards, forehand leads to the first trick and players must follow suit if able, otherwise may play any card. Scoring is entirely in minus points. The contracts are:

1st series

1. Oberei. Each Ober costs 5 points or 10 if in the first or last trick. If two fall together, the score is doubled; if three fall, tripled.
2. Herzerei. Each heart captured costs 1 point, except for kings, Obers and Unters which cost 2, 3 and 4 points each.
3. Progress. The first trick taken costs 1, the second 2, etc. If a player takes all tricks, the rest score 30 each.
4. Bilder Plus. The aim is to capture picture cards (AKOU). Players score the difference between the ones they capture and the number captured by the player who took the most. If the latter capture 7, the scores are doubled, if 10 tripled and if 13 quadrupled. If a player captures all picture cards; the others score 96 points each.
5. Fressen. Scoffer. Players are dealt 3 cards each and the rest form a stock. A player who cannot follow suit must draw cards from stock one-by-one until able to follow. As soon as someone goes "out", the rest score 1 point for each card in hand; as the second goes out, cards score double, and as the third goes out, treble.
6. Minorl'n or sequences. Only suit sequences count; pip cards score their face value, courts 10 and Aces 11.
7. Rothe König. Red king. Capturing the king of hearts scores 40 in the first trick, 80 in the last; otherwise 20.
8. Siebenerei. Sevens. The first 7 to fall costs 15, the second 30, third 45 and fourth 60. By agreement the score doubles if two fall in one trick.
9. Achmed. After receiving cards, forehand may choose any contract and play it out of turn. He may choose a Fressen after seeing 3 cards or a Pereat after seeing 4.
10. Ultimo. The first and last tricks cost 20 each, unless a player takes every trick in which case the others score 30 each.

2nd series

1. Quarten. Quartets
2. Grethel. A card is only beaten by another of the same rank. Suit is not followed. If the player with the most tricks has 5 tricks or fewer, the game is single, with 6 tricks it is worth double, 7 tricks treble and 8 tricks fourfold. If two players have the maximum number of tricks, the scores are doubled.
3. Regress. Like progress, but the first trick scores 8, the second 7, etc. Taking all tricks costs the other players 30.
4. Bilder Minus The reverse of Bilder Plus
5. Double Noir and Double Rouge. Only cards of either the red or the black suits count. (Note: With German cards, pair acorns with leaves or hearts with bells.) Cards taken may score 1 or 2 points as agreed.
6. Pereat. Players are dealt 4 cards. The rules are "assumed to be known to all players".
7. Bestimmter Stich. Pick a trick. Forehand names a trick (e.g. "5th trick") and the player who takes it scores 30.
8. Laufen. Runners. A card is chosen at random by the dealer and placed down as "1". Players, in turn, count as many cards off as they wish e.g. "2, 3, 4..." but if the count matches the card, they score that number and the dealer chooses another card. This continues until the stock is exhausted.
9. Verdeckte Bataille. Covert battle. Cards may not be viewed; same suit beats. The first trick costs 5, the second 10, third 15, etc.
10. Rumpel. The Obers of acorns and leaves are wild. Suit is not followed. The game starts with a 7 and players must discard as many as possible in sequence. As the first player goes "out", the others score 2 points per card in hand, 4 when the second player goes out and 8 when the third goes out.

There was an elaborate method for turning scores into payments for the drinks bill.

=== Rumpel (2018) ===
Rumpel is played today in the county of Passau using a pack of 36 Bavarian pattern cards by four to nine players. (Note: If 36 is not divisible by the number of players, cards may need to be removed.) Each of them completes four rounds that are known as 'kingdoms' (Königreiche).

In each contract, players must follow suit (Farbzwang) but do not have to win the trick (i.e. no Stichzwang). Only penalty points are recorded. The contracts in each kingdom, together with their individual objectives, are as follows:

1. Oberei: To avoid taking tricks in which there are one or more Obers. Each Ober taken costs 3 penalty points, unless two or more are taken in one trick or an Ober falls in the first or last trick, in which case each Ober costs 6 points.
2. Manderlspiel: To capture as many Manderls (picture cards – A, K, O, U) as possible. Players score the difference between the number they took and the number taken by the winner. If a player takes 10 or more Manderls, the penalties are doubled.
3. Quarten: Cards must be played in suit sequence and the fourth wins. Sevens and Aces are unbeatable. As soon as one player has only one card left; the game pauses and the King writes down the number of cards each player has. The game continues in order to form quartets from all table cards. The second time the scores are written down, they are doubled; the third time trebled.
4. Greteln: Each player is dealt six cards; eight cards are placed face up on the table. These together with one's hand cards are used to form and take capture pairs (Ace with Ace) which the player may lay face up or down. Upcards must be turned after one round unless another player can pair with an upcard and take it. Anyone who cannot form a pair, must lay a card face up on the table. Each player scores the difference between pairs taken and the maximum possible.
5. Herzerei: To avoid tricks with Heart cards. The Seven of Hearts scores 8 penalty points; the Ace of Hearts scores 1. Variant of Herzla and Hearts.
6. Fressen: Each player is dealt just 3 cards; the rest remain face down on the table as the talon. Anyone who cannot follow suit, must pick a card from the talon until he can follow suit. If the first, second and third player shed all their cards; scores are recorded.
7. Eins-Zwei-Drei: The first trick scores one penalty point, the second 2 etc. If a player takes all tricks, the others score 25 penalty points each and the game is repeated.
8. Achmed. Forehand looks at his or her cards and announces a contract.

Rumpel: This special bonus is claimed if anyone has a hand with all the cards from seven to ace. Obers may be used as wild cards. Rumpel scores up to 60 penalty points.

== Großer Rumpel ==
Matthias Mala describes rules for "Großer Rumpel" in his 2004 compendium, published in Munich. This game is simply four-hand Rumpel with a pack of 32 Bavarian pattern cards, (Note: There is of course no reason why three to nine cannot play, as above.) but with eight or twelve contracts selected from a field of twenty-nine. These include all the above with the exception of Greteln. However, Manderlspiel is known as Plus, Eins-Zwei-Drei as Progress and Fressen as Fessare. In many of the contracts, if a player fully achieves the opposite aim, the remainder lose and incur penalty points. All the contracts can be played as individual games; indeed Grün-Ober and Bierkopf (Kappa in this list) are traditional Bavarian games. The remaining contracts comprise the following:

1. Siebnerei: To avoid capturing sevens (Siebner)
2. Achtern: To avoid capturing eights (Achten)
3. Alle Neun: To capture nines (Neunen)
4. Zehnerfang: To avoid capturing tens (Zehnen)
5. Untergang: To avoid capturing Unters
6. Grün-Ober: To avoid taking the first or last trick or the green Ober; basic version of Grasobern
7. Ultimo: To avoid taking the first or last tricks
8. Xerxes: To avoid capturing the K
9. Minus: To avoid capturing any court cards
10. Regress: To avoid taking tricks; each successive trick costing fewer points
11. Majorsequenz: To avoid taking tricks that contain sets or sequences
12. Quodlibet: To avoid capturing Obers or sevens while playing 'blind'
13. Solo: To score as many card points as possible. Forehand names trumps based on first 4 cards. ace–ten game
14. Straßenraub: To score as few card points as possible; ace–ten game and variant of Ramsch, Ouvert
15. Eichenlaub: As solo, but only leaves and acorns count; ace–ten game
16. Schellenherz: To score as few points as possible; only bells and hearts count; ace–ten game
17. Transmission: To take as many points as possible, passing tricks to the right; ace–ten game
18. Kappa: Play as for Bierkopf; partnership game; ace–ten game
19. Peredo: Partnership game in which only cards of the same rank beat
20. Handel: Three-card game similar to commerce
21. Stichwahl: Forehand decides which trick loses the deal

== Literature ==
- Holzapfel, Roland (2008) Ein "Rumpler" sucht Gleichgesinnte. In: Passauer Neue Presse, 03 June 2008 (p. 10)
- Kalb, Wilhelm (1892). Die Alte Burschenschaft und ihre Entwicklung in Erlangen. Erlangen: Max Mencke.
- Linke, Johannes (1886). Wann wurde das Lutherlied Ein feste Burg ist unser Gott verfasst? Leipzig: Vereinshaus.
- Mala, Matthias (2004). Das Grosse Buch der Kartenspiele. Munich: Bassermann. Originally published 1997, Munich: Falken.
