= Slobberhannes =

Trick-taking card game

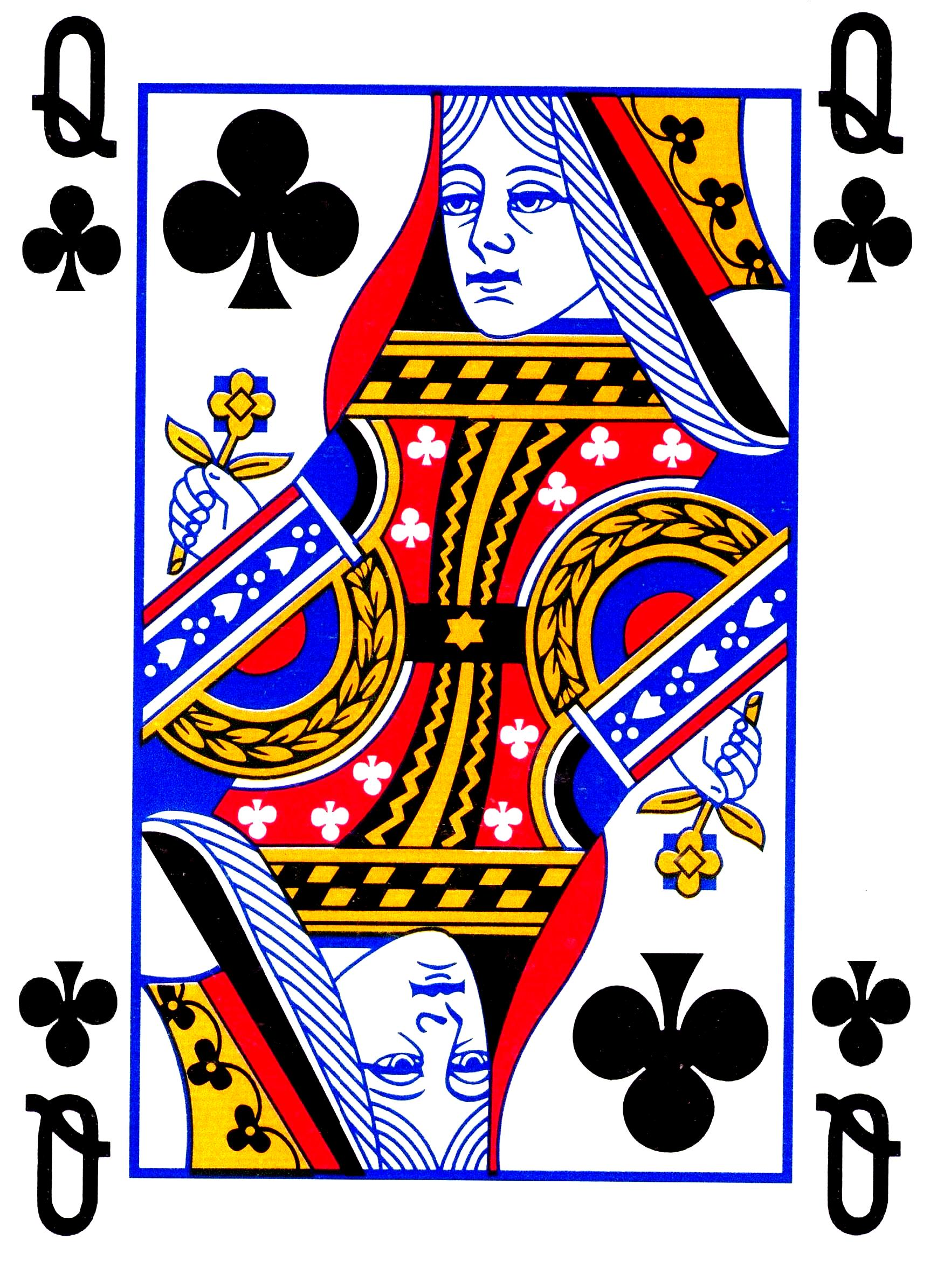
- "Slobberhannes"
- Origin: USA
- Type: Trick-avoidance
- Players: 4
- Cards: 32
- Deck: French
- Rank (high→low): A K Q J 10 9 8 7
- Play: Clockwise

Related games
- Grasobern
- Aim: avoid winning 1st and last tricks or capturing the Q♣

Slobberhannes is a trick-taking, American card game, possibly of German origin, for four players, in which the aim is to avoid taking the first and last tricks and the queen of clubs. Hoyle's describes it as "really quite an excellent game for the family circle" that "can be played with equal enjoyment either for counters or for small stakes..

== Background ==
The origin of Slobberhannes is unclear. According to Parlett, the game originated in Germany, its name means "Slippery Jack", it is the German equivalent of Polignac and may have been the latter's predecessor. However, the game is not attested in any German sources before the 21st century and, despite its name, appears to be of American provenance.

Geiser also claims that Slobberhannes is a German game and that it is known in Austria as Schinderhansen or Eichelobern, after the nickname of an infamous German outlaw, Johannes Bückler, who orchestrated one of the most famous crime sprees in history, before being executed in 1803. (Note: Bückler was also known as Schinderhannes, another name for the children's game of Schwarzer Peter.) Schinderhansen is played in Salzburg, Tyrol and Upper Austria and the name of the variant, Eichelobern, suggests that it is traditionally played with German-suited cards.

Along with Snip, Snap, Snorum, Slobberhannes was played by early American settlers and, since, all literary references to it appear in English-language card game books dating back to at least 1880, it may have been originally introduced to the US by German immigrants playing Schinderhannes, a variant of Grasobern, which is an Austro-Bavarian game with much older roots. This is reinforced by an 1897 German-English dictionary which describes Slobberhannes as an American word for a card game for four players in which one sought "to avoid taking the first and last tricks." Over time the game became played with French playing cards which were locally produced and more easily obtainable.

== Rules ==
=== Aim ===
The game may be played by 3–6 players, but is best suited to 4 players. The aim is to avoid winning the first or last tricks and to avoid capturing the Queen of Clubs.

=== Cards ===
It is played with a 52-card French pack from which the Twos, Threes, Fours, Fives and Sixes have been removed, leaving 32 cards. Cards rank as in Whist, with Ace high and Seven low. The 7♣ and 7♠ are omitted if the number of players is other than four. There are no trumps.

=== Playing ===
Players cut to determine who leads, the lead player is the one who cuts the highest card. The player to his right deals. Dealing and play are clockwise, 8 cards (assuming there are four players; otherwise 10, 6 or 5) being dealt to each player, one at a time. Players must follow suit if possible; if not, they may play any card. The highest card of the led suit wins the trick and the winner leads to the next trick.

=== Scoring ===
A point is deducted in each case from the player who wins the first trick, last trick or the Queen of Clubs. If a player wins all 3, they lose 4 points. A point is also deducted for a revoke, i.e. when a player fails to follow suit and does not correct it before the end of the trick.

== Tactics ==
Possession of the Q♣ is not always dangerous. If it is well "guarded" and one can rely on it not being forced out by the Club leads of the other players, and one will, sooner or later, be able to discard it. As in Black Maria and those Misere hands which lend so much interest to Solo, one wants to conserve as long as possible the low cards which control the suit.

== Literature ==
- _ (1897). Encyklopädisches englisch-deutsches und deutsch-englisches Wörterbuch. Berlin : Langenscheidt.
- Dawson, Lawrence H. (2013). Hoyle's Games Modernized - Cards - Board Games and Billiards. Read Books. ISBN 978-14474-95994.
- Parlett, David (2008). The Penguin Book of Card Games. London: Penguin. ISBN 978-0-141-03787-5.
- "Trumps" (1880). The Modern Pocket Hoyle (10th rev. & corr. ed.). New York: Dick & Fitzgerald.
