= Wigtown Book Festival =

Literary festival in Scotland (founded 1999)

The Wigtown Book Festival is a ten-day literary festival held each autumn in Wigtown, Dumfries and Galloway, south-west Scotland. The festival was first held in 1999 and has grown to be the second biggest book festival in Scotland.

== 2024 Festival ==
In 2024, the festival took place between 27 September and 6 October. The 2024 festival had more than 250 planned events, with a focus on discussing the Galloway Coast and climate change. Performers at the 2024 festival included actor Alan Cumming, poet Pam Ayres and writer Irvine Welsh.

== History ==
The first festival took place in 1999.

In 2007, the Wigtown Festival Company became a registered charity.

In 2013, there were 7500 visitors to the festival, more than half of which were from outside Dumfries and Galloway. A report commissioned by the Wigtown Festival Company in 2013 estimated that the festival contributed £2 million to the regional economy each year. This was three times higher than that estimated by a similar study in 2008.

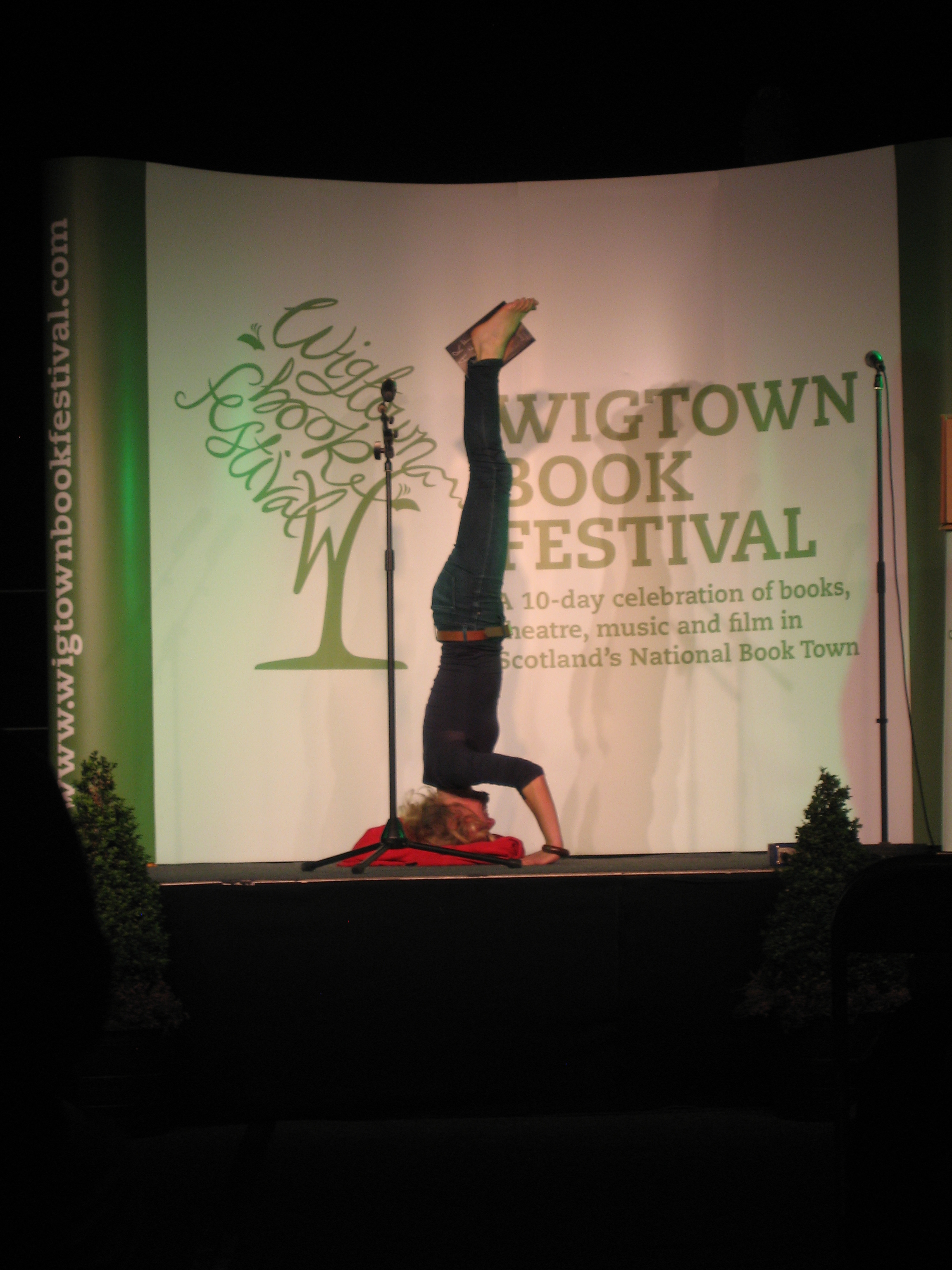
Samantha Harvey on stage during the 2014 festival

As a result of the COVID-19 pandemic in 2020, the festival was held entirely online. It resumed as a physical festival in September 2021. 2021 performers included the crime writer Val McDermid and the novelist Nadifa Mohamed.

The 2022 festival involved more than 200 events, with novelist and speakers including Karen Campbell and Hugh McMillan.

The 2023 festival took place from 22 September to 1 October. Performers and readers included Nigel Planer, Kate Mosse and Jo Caulfield.

== Events, competitions and prizes ==
Regular festival events include the annual James Mirrlees lecture, which marks the local Nobel Prize economist.

The Anne Brown Prize has been given since 2021 for the best essay. It is named for Anne Brown, a former chairwoman and trustee of the festival and comes with a £1,500 financial prize.

=== Poetry competition ===
The festival runs an annual international poetry competition and awards three separate prizes for compositions in English, Scottish Gaelic and Scots. Prizes are given to winners.
