= Matzlfangen =

Card game

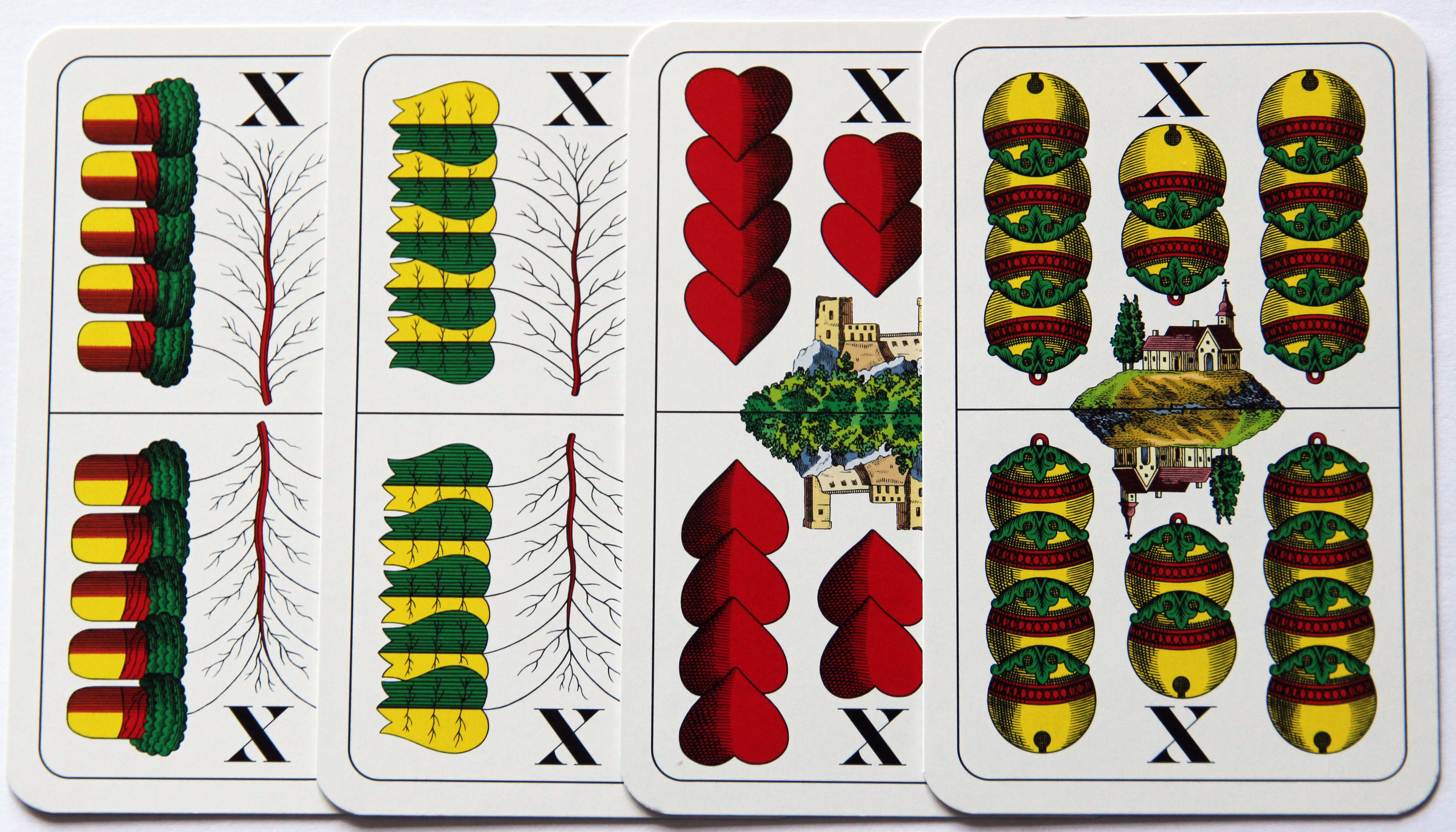
- The Matzln in a William Tell pack
- Origin: Bavaria
- Type: Point-trick
- Players: 4
- Cards: 32
- Deck: William Tell
- Rank (high→low): A 10 O U 9 8 7
- Play: Clockwise

Matzlfangen ("catching tens") is a traditional point-trick, card game for 4 players that originated in the Bavarian province of Upper Palatinate over 200 years ago and spread to Austria. It is still played in a few places today. The game is named after the ten or Matzl, which plays a key role.

== History ==
Matzlfangen is an old Bavarian card game, being recorded as early as 1809 as Mätzelfangen, a game that was played "only in the Upper Palatinate and usually in the countryside." In 1826 it was reported in the Bavarian Courier being played at home around the table by "master craftsmen, journeymen and apprentices", along with Solo, Schafkopf, Kreuzmariage, Grasobern and others. In 1827 we read that Mätz is a contemptuous word for "woman" and, again, that Mätzlein fangen is a card game popular in the Upper Palatinate. Grimm (1885), however, records that Metzlein or Mätzlein is simply a maiden and that "around Straubing it is term of endearment for a girl." (Note: In addition Metzlein, with which it is phonetically identical, was a unit of volume equivalent to about 1–1½ litres.)

It is named after the ten, which is known colloquially as the Matzl or Matz ("hussy"). It is a pub game that still belongs to the village culture of Austria, having been brought to Hackenbuch in Upper Austria by peat cutters around a century ago and spread outwards from there to the northern Flachgau. For around 100 years it has been Hackenbuch's "standard game". It may be ancestral to catch the ten which is mentioned as early as 1779.

== Rules ==
The rules that follow are based on Daglinger.

Matzlfangen is a four-hand game, played with a pack of 32 Double German cards. The aim of the game is to score more than 65 points.

Ranks and card-point values of cards
Rank	Sow	10	K	O	U	9	8	7
Value	11	10	4	3	2	–		

The cards rank and score as follows:

- Sow –11
- Matzl (ten) – 10
- King – 4
- Ober – 3
- Unter – 2
- 9, 8 and 7 – 0

Winning the last trick scores 10 points, bringing the total points available to 130, hence 66 or more are required to win the game.

Dealing and play are clockwise. The dealer deals eight cards each in batches of four. The last card dealt (to the dealer) is flipped to determine the trump suit. If the player to the dealer's right knocks on the pack of cards, all eight cards to each player are distributed in one batch.

All players in turn starting with forehand announce if they want to play a contract higher than Rufen. A player is only allowed to speak once in the bidding. Any bid must be higher than previous bids. A player who doesn't want to make a bid says "weiter". If everyone says "weiter", a Rufen is played. There are five contracts which, from lowest to highest, are:

- Rufen: the normal game in which forehand calls for a non-trump card of his choice that he does not hold (usually a Sow); the player with the called card becomes his partner for the duration of the deal.
- Treiben: a solo contract in which the soloist plays the three defenders. The soloist may choose any suit as trumps.
- Neid-Spiel or Trumpf: all is as in Treiben except that the dealer's turnup determines trumps.
- Durch: a slam in which there are no trumps and the declarer has to take all the tricks.
- Trumpf-Durch: as Durch, but the dealer's trump upcard determines trumps.

== Spritzen ==
Players/teams may raise (spritzen) alternately, each announcement adds 1 stake or game point to the game value (N.B. unlike other games there is no doubling, redoubling, etc.). Players are only allowed to announce a raise or reraise before a card has been led to the first trick. Raising is done by announcements in the following order: Schuß, Re, Sub, Dut, Hirsch, Gams, Jager, Gweih, Auffi, Drauffi.

== Play ==
In Durch and Trumpf-Durch, the declarer leads; otherwise forehand is on lead. Players must follow suit and head the trick if possible. A player who is unable to follow suit must trump or overtrump if a trump has already been played. In other words, Farbzwang, Trumpfzwang and Stichzwang apply. A player who has no card of the suit led and no trumps may play any card. The trick is won by the highest trump in it, or if it contains no trump by the highest card of the suit led. The winner of each trick leads to the next.

== Matzl ==
If a team wins the trump Matzl from their opponents, they are automatically absolved from paying the stake for the game including any additional penalties ("no water" or "double"). If they then also win the game they score an extra bonus point. However, this is not paid automatically by the losers and has to be claimed.

== Scoring ==
At the end of each deal, the card points are added up as per the schedule above plus 10 points for the winner(s) of the last trick.

The game is usually played for stakes. The basic stake (Einsatz or Spieleinsatz) being agreed beforehand. In Rufen and Treiben, a straight win is worth 1 stake or game point. If the losers have "no water" (kein Wasser), i.e. score less than 30, the game is worth double If the losers fail to take a trick, the game is worth treble. A Durch scores 6 stakes or game points.

== Zehnerfangen ==
A card game called Zehnerfangen or Zehner-Fangen ("catching tens") is recorded in Austria and Bavaria in the mid-19th century, but no details of play are given. It has the same meaning as Matzlfangen.

== Literature ==
- Das Comité (1870). "Große 66 Partie" in Fürther Tagblatt (1870), p. 3.
- Geiser, Remigius (2004). "100 Kartenspiele des Landes Salzburg" (PDF). Talon (13). Archived from the original (PDF) on 27 August 2018.
- Grimm, Jacob and Wilhelm Grimm (1885), Deutsches Wörterbuch, Volume 2, Issue 6. Leipzig: Hirzel.
- Schmeller Johann Andreas (1827). Bayerisches Wörterbuch, Volume 1, Stuttgart and Tübingen: J.G. Cotta.
- Seidenbusch, Christian (1866), "Sport und Spiel" in Ein Sträußchen komischer Vorträge by Ch. T. Seidenbusch. Vol. 14, Freising: Fran Paul Datterer. pp. 16 ff.
- von Destouches, Joseph Anton (1809). Statistische Darstellung der Oberpfalz und ihrer Hauptstadt Amberg.
