= Schlauch (card game) =

German card game

- "An entertaining card game for thirsty players"
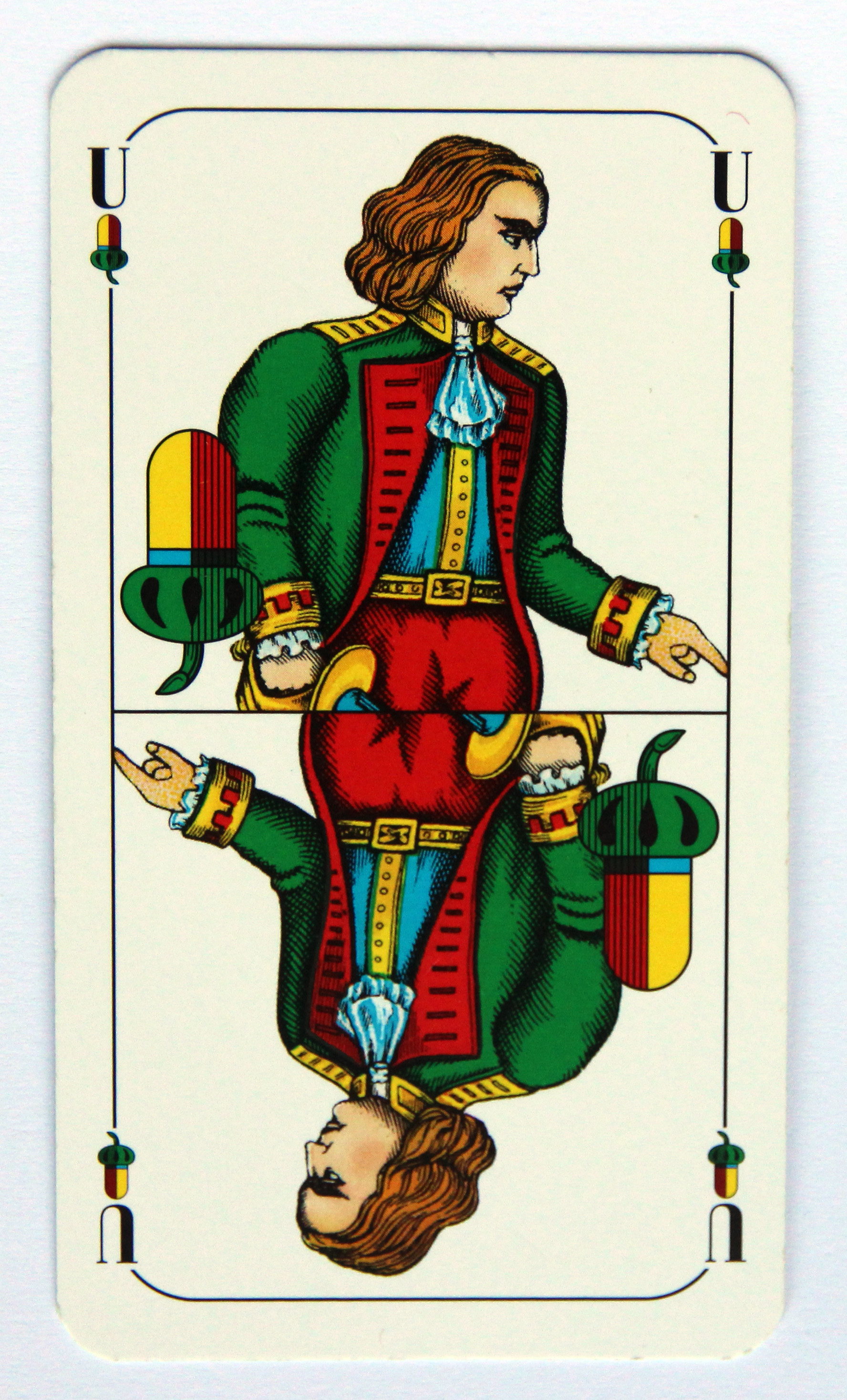
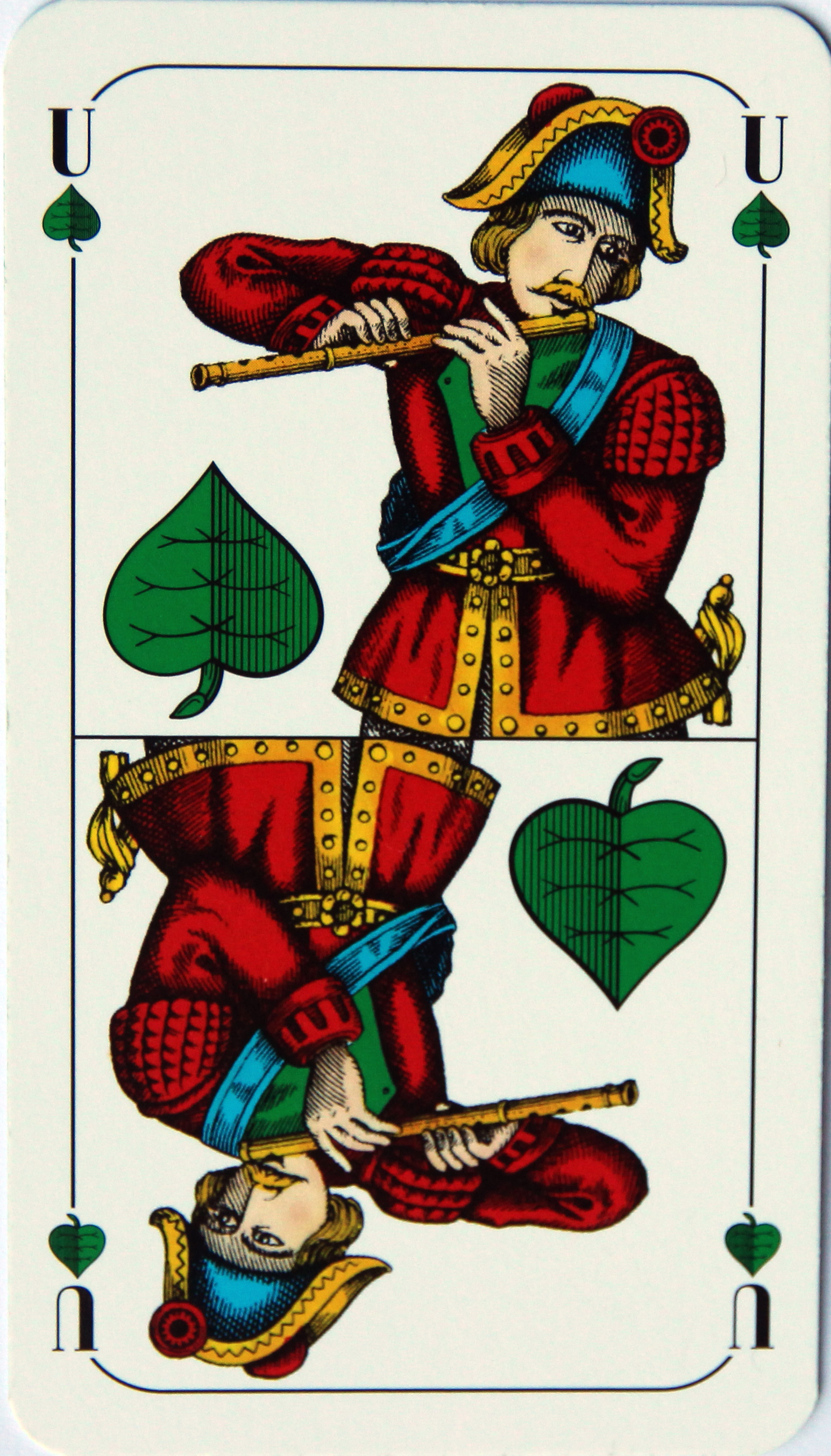
- In a Schlauch the trump Unter and Unter of the next suit are the top trumps
- Origin: Germany
- Alternative names: Bier-Schlauch, Bierschlauch
- Type: Point-trick
- Players: 3
- Cards: 32
- Deck: German
- Rank (high→low): depends on contract

Related games
- German Tarok • Réunion

Schlauch is an extinct Bavarian point-trick card game that was popular in the mid-19th century as a drinking game, hence it was also known as Bier-Schlauch.

== History ==
The game is recorded as early as 1839 in a "Humorous Lecture about the Game of Schlauch" given in Munich and recounted in a local newspaper. In Erlangen in the 1850s it had "long since been superseded" by Rumpel, Tarock and Skat. However around the same time it was still thriving further south in Lower Bavaria because Schlauch tournaments known as "Schlauch-Rennen" (literally "Schlauch Races") were being held alongside those for Grasober and Tarok. In 1883 it was the subject of a treatise by Mangold Jups who called it "Bier-Schlauch. An Entertaining Card Game for the Benefit of Thirsty Card Players." The game may be related to German Tarok and/or Réunion.

== Overview ==
Schlauch was a three-hand, bidding and trick-taking game played with 32 German-suited cards in which the aim was to win the auction and achieve one's selected contract.

The basic contracts were:

- Schlauch – the declarer chooses trumps, calls for a card to exchange with and aims to win every trick.
- Bettel – there are no trumps and the declarer aims to lose every trick.
- Grandioso – there are no trumps and the declarer aims to win every trick. Cards rank in ace–ten order.

However, there were two versions of the game. In Little Schlauch, there was a higher possible bid for each of the above. In Great Schlauch or Heidelberg Schlauch, there were double contracts in which the aim changed halfway through the deal.

== Rules ==
The following rules for Little Schlauch are based on Pierer (1862), except where cited otherwise.

=== Preliminaries ===
Three players use a 32-card, Bavarian or Franconian pattern pack. Players draw a card from the pack and the one with the highest card deals first. The dealer shuffles, offers it to the right for cutting and then places the bottom card of the pack on the table face up. The dealer then deals 10 cards each in 3 packets (3-4-3). However, the dealer's last packet comprises 4 cards which, together with the turnup is a hand of 12 cards. The dealer then discards 2, showing any ace or any card of the turnup suit to the others first.

=== Auction ===
Once the dealer has laid away the 2 cards of the skat, there is an auction. Beginning with forehand to the left, players pass or announce a contract. The contracts in Little Schlauch are:

- Grandioso. The declarer undertakes to take all tricks having first called for a card and given the opponent another in exchange. There are no trumps and the declarer leads to the first trick. Cards rank in the usual Ace-Ten order: A 10 K O U 9 8 7.
- Bettel. The declarer commits not to take any tricks. There are no trumps and forehand leads. Cards rank in natural order: A K O U 10 9 8 7.
- Schlauch in Acorns, Leaves, Bells ("Suit Schlauch"). The declarer call for a card and gives one in exchange before announcing trumps. Cards rank in Ace-Ten order except that the trump Unter is the highest card and the Unter of the next suit is the second highest. For this purpose, Acorns are paired with Leaves and Hearts with Bells.
- Grandissimo. As Grandioso but no exchanging.
- Bettelouvert. As Bettel, but the declarer leads and, after the first trick, plays ouvert.
- Heart Schlauch. A Schlauch in which Hearts are trumps.

A Schlauch bid in the preference suit of Hearts overcalls a Schlauch bid in any other suit. If all pass, a force game of Schlauch in the turnup suit may be played in which the one with the most card points wins. Card points are as follows: trump Unters 12, Ace 11, Ten 10, King 4, Ober 3, remaining Unters 2 each, rest 0. In a Grandioso, all the Unters are worth 7. The last trick always scores 10. Alternatively the dealer incurs a penalty mark and redeals.

=== Play ===
The contract determines who leads to the first trick. Players must follow suit if possible; otherwise may play any card. The trick is won by the highest trump or by the highest card of the led suit if no trumps are played. The trick winner leads to the next trick.

=== Scoring ===
A win for the declarer earns 150 points for Grandioso, Bettel and a Suit Schlauch, 300 for a Grandissimo or Heart Schlauch. The defenders chalk up 2 or 4 marks (lines on a slate) as penalties. A loss by the declarer incurs 4 or 8 marks respectively, while the defenders score 100 or 200 points each. After each round of three hands, players compare scores and, for every 100 points a player has in excess of another the latter incurs 1 penalty stroke and whoever has the fewest points also incurs a penalty stroke. Players score or are paid in proportion to the number of strokes they score.

== Literature ==
- _ (1854). Kurier für Niederbayern: Landshuter Tag- u. Anzeigerblatt. 14 March 1854. Landshut. p. 292.
- An der Salzach, Klausner (1839), Münchner Bock-Blatt. 5 May 1839. No. 2.
- Jups, Mangold (1883). Bier-Schlauch: Ein unterhaltendes Kartenspiel. Zu Nutz und Frommen durstiger Hocker, newly published by Mangold Jups and others. Würzburg: Stahel.
- Kalb, Wilhelm (1892). Die Alte Burschenschaft und ihre Entwicklung in Erlangen. Erlangen: Max Mencke.
- Pierer, Heinrich August (1862). Pierer's Universal-Lexikon der Vergangenheit und Gegenwart..., Volume 15. 4th rev. and improved edn. p. 220.
