= Dick & Fitzgerald =

American publisher

- Industry: Publishing
- Headquarters: New York City, United States

Dick & Fitzgerald was a 19th-century United States publisher, founded by William Brisbane Dick (1827–1901) and Lawrence R. Fitzgerald (1826-1881), based in New York City. Their address at one time was 18 Ann Street. Dick and Fitzgerald was a publisher of popular books, including music books.

Eric Lott cites them as one of the leading publishers circa 1850 of songbooks (typically just lyrics, not melodies) of the popular blackface minstrel songs of the time, which he characterizes as "little lyric volumes of mass-produced racist caricature."

They were also publishers of books on subjects such as baseball, card games, card tricks, dream interpretation, divination, dowsing, ballroom dancing and amusement. Also a book called North's Book of Love Letters, with Directions How to Write and When to Use Them.

== Notes ==
1. Kalashnikova.
2. Lott, 1993, 171.
