= John Mactaggart (writer) =

Scottish author and engineer

John Mactaggart (26 June 1791 – 8 January 1830) was a Scottish writer and engineer born near Plunton Castle in the parish of Borgue. He is best known for writing The Scottish Gallovidian Encyclopedia, a wide-ranging and idiosyncratic reference work covering local words, places, traditions, and songs collected in and around Galloway.

Mactaggart studied at the University of Edinburgh for one session but didn't return. Away from Edinburgh he "learned the engineering", working on John Rennie's Plymouth Breakwater. Through this work he was recommended to the post of clerk of works on the Rideau Canal, in Canada.

Mactaggart arrived in Canada in August 1826. In addition to his work on the canal project he wrote several newspaper articles and was elected to the Natural History Society of Montreal.

In 1828 Mactaggart suffered from an epidemic fever. He was subsequently dismissed for "being drunk on duty" and returned from Canada to England in later that year. In 1829 Mactaggart published Three Years in Canada.

Mactagggart died on 8 January 1830 at Torrs, Kirkcudbrightshire and is buried in Senwick kirkyard in Borgue.
