= Grasobern =

Bavarian card game

- "A game with a rather leisurely character"
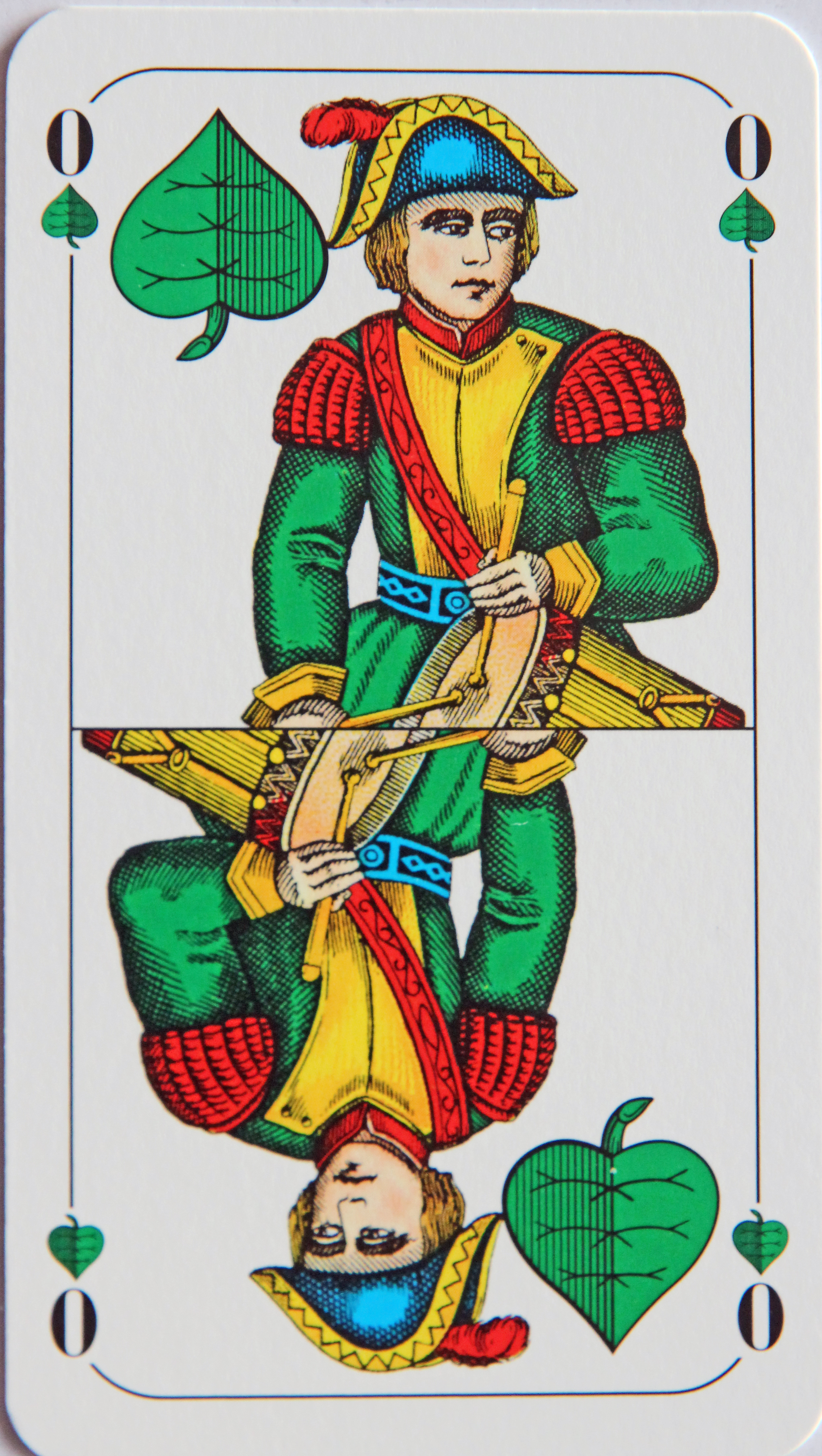
- The Grasober
- Origin: Germany
- Alternative names: Grasoberln, Graseberla, Grünobern
- Type: Trick-avoidance, Plain-trick
- Players: 4
- Cards: 32
- Deck: German
- Rank (high→low): A K O U 10 9 8 7
- Play: Clockwise
- Playing time: 5 min/hand; 20 min/round

Related games
- Eichelobern • Schinderhansen • Slobberhannes
- Aim: avoid winning 1st and last tricks or capturing the O

Grasobern, Grasoberl, Grasoberln, Graseberla, Grünobern, Lauboberl or Laubobern is a card game that was once commonly played in Old Bavaria, especially in the old counties of Bad Aibling and Rosenheim, and is still popular in eastern Bavaria, especially in Upper Palatinate. The game has relatively simple rules and thus a rather relaxing and leisurely character without the mental demands of Schafkopf or psychological stress of Watten, two other traditional Bavarian card games. The name is taken from the game's penalty card, the Ober of Leaves. The suit of Leaves is known in German variously as Laub ("leaves, foliage"), Gras ("grass") or Grün ("green").

== History ==
Grasobern originated in "Old Bavaria" – Altbayern - and is recorded in the Bavarian Courier as early as 1826 (as Grünober) being played at home around the table by the "master craftsmen, journeymen and apprentices", along with Solo, Schafkopf, Kreuzmariage, Matzlfangen and others. However, as Lauboberspiel ("the game of Laubober") it was already popular by around 1800 as a form of evening relaxation during long winter evenings in rural communities where it was known as "the brothers' game" due to the low stakes it was played for. As Laubobern, Grasobern or Grasoberln, the game features in 19th century poetry and literature as a social game. Meyer (1852) includes it among the drinking games together with Cerevis, Schlauch and Quodlibet.

Competitions known as Grasober-Rennen (lit. "Grasober Races") were held as early as the mid-19th century in Lower Bavaria, for example, in Landshut or Munich. Sometimes these were held alongside other tournaments for games such as Schlauch, Tarok Wallachen and even Quadrille. These competitions occurred regularly until preparations for the First World War began, but restarted in the late 1920s and 1930s (alongside Tarock) in Upper Bavaria. Today competitions are still played, for example, in Bromberg, Windach, Reutberg, Bad Aibling and Augsburg, but are sometimes called Preisgrasobern ("Prize Grasobern") or Grasober-Turniere ("Grasober tournaments").

No early rules are known, but it is likely that it began as a relatively simple game, played like its American cousin, Slobberhannes, to which the various Bettel and Mord contracts were added later. (Note: Bettel and Mord are first recorded in the game of Brandeln.) This had happened by 1890 at the latest for we read that, in a competition in Griesbach, prizes were awarded not just for the winners, but for the player who had paid the most penalties for the Grasober and for those who had won or lost the most Mord and Bettel games.

Together with Schafkopf, Watten, and Wallachen, Bohemian Watten and Grasobern were once among the most popular card games in Old Bavaria and therefore an integral part of Bavarian pub culture. Although great fun, these two games are hardly played today and are thus threatened with extinction. As a result, both cultural and traditional costume (Trachten) societies are striving to keep the game alive by holding tournaments. Even municipalities, such as the market town of Bruckmühl, or smaller local associations, for example the volunteer fire-brigade in the market town of Metten, routinely hold tournaments for Grasobern, Schafkopf and other card games. Some societies are also teaching children how to play the game.

The game is named after the Ober of Leaves or 'Grass Ober', known in German as the Gras-Ober or Grasober.

In Austria, it is usually known as Grünobern, but also goes under the names of Bauernsuchen, Grasobern, Grasoberln, Grasoberspiel, Grünbubenspiel, Grüneln, Grünoberfangen and Grünoberjagen. Players of the game are known as Grasoberer and competitions as Grasoberrennen ("Grasober Races") or Grasober-Turniere ("Grasober Tournaments").

== Players and cards ==
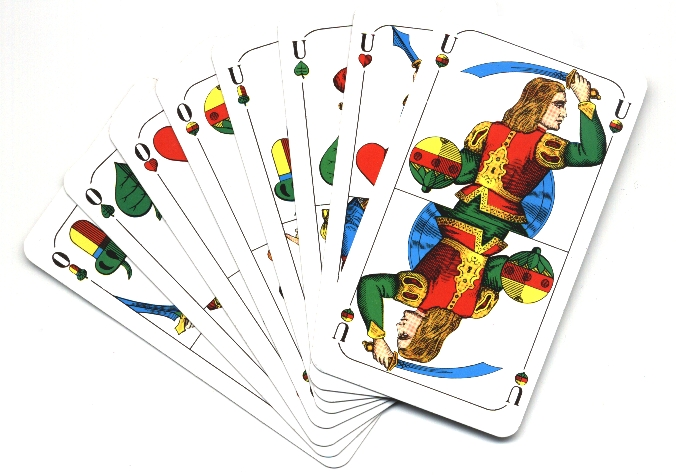
Bavarian pattern deck

Grasobern is usually played with four players and a traditional pack of 32 Bavarian-pattern playing cards, although it can theoretically be played with as few as three or as many as eight players. In the trade, card packs are usually marketed under the name Tarock/Schafkopf, from which the Sixes are removed in order to play Grasobern. Each player is dealt the same number (e. g. 40) of counters or coins (Spielmünzen or Blöcke) of the same value (e. g. 5 euro cents); at the end the difference is balanced out by 'buying' (Zukaufen i.e. losses) or 'selling' (Verkaufen i.e. winnings).

If three play, the Sixes and Sevens and Eights are removed and each player receives 8 cards.

In Austria, William Tell packs are always used and the game may be played with 32 or 36 cards.

Suits of German playing cards
Bells (Schellen)	Hearts (Herz)	Leaves/Grass (Gras)	Acorns (Eichel)

== Card ranking ==
There are no trumps in Grasobern. The ranking of card values follows the hierarchy of plain-trick games, such as Watten, i. e. the Ten ranks between the Unter and the Nine. The ranking of cards in each suit is as follows (highest to lowest): Sow (Sau), also called the Ace (Ass) albeit in reality a Deuce (Daus) > King > Ober > Unter > Ten > Nine > Eight > Seven.

Hierarchy of the cards within the four suits
Acorns	Leaves/Grass	Hearts	Bells
A K O U 10 9 8 7	A K O U 10 9 8 7	A K O U 10 9 8 7	A K O U 10 9 8 7

== Aim ==
Grasobern is a pure plain-trick game. In the 'normal game' the aim is to avoid taking the first trick, the last trick and the trick containing the Grasober, the Ober of Leaves. Taking these tricks results in a penalty (Miese), which means that the player who wins them has to pay an agreed fee in coins or counters, such as a Fünferl (five cents) or Zehnerl (10 cents), into the pot or has points deducted.

There are also higher contracts than the normal game.. In Mord ("murder") and Schleichmord ("sneaky murder"), the aim is to win all the tricks. In Bettel, the goal is to lose all the tricks. In these three contracts, the Grasober is not relevant for scoring purposes.

== Dealing ==
Dealing proceeds clockwise and each player receives eight cards in two packets of four; thus all cards are dealt and there is no talon as, for example, in Bavarian Tarock.{ If the player to the right of the dealer knocks with his fist on the deck, instead of cutting, stakes are doubled and each player is dealt one packet of eight cards in clockwise order.

== Playing ==
=== Bidding ===
After each player has received eight cards, the player to the left of the dealer, forehand begins a single round of bidding in which players either pass or bid to play a Mord or a Bettel. Mord outranks Bettel, but if two players announce a contract of equal value (e. g. two bid for a Bettel), positional priority decides; i.e. player nearest to the dealer's left has priority. If all pass, a normal game is played.

=== Normal game ===
If all pass, a normal game is played in which every player plays for himself. There are no teams. Forehand leads to the first trick and everyone else must follow suit. A player unable to follow suit, must play the Grasober if held. If not, any card may be played. In addition, the Grasober must be played if the King of Leaves or Sow of Leaves has been led.

Taking the first or last trick costs the player a unit or block, e.g. 5 cents, to the pot. Anyone who captures the Grasober in his tricks pays out two blocks to the pot. If a player incurs all the penalties, i. e. takes the first and last trick as well as the Grasober, he is a Farmer (Bauer) and has to pay four blocks to the pot. His fellow players stand up with a shout of "Hello!" to draw his attention to the fact that he has to pay a total of four blocks. Payment is made to a common pot, which is divided equally among the players at the end. If a player has wrongly played the Grasober, he pays the two blocks due to the pot and is thus punished for his infringement.

At the end of the game, or as agreed, the pot is divided among the players.

=== Other contracts ===
In addition to the normal game there are three higher contracts:

- Mord
- Bettel
- Schleicher

The Grasober plays no role in these contracts and the payments for winning or losing are paid directly from the loser(s) to the winner(s); the pot is not involved.

==== Mord (Rufmord) ====
If a player believes he is in a position to win all the tricks, he can announce a Mord (which roughly corresponds to the Solo Tout in Schafkopf). The Mord declarer may call for a card from his opponents and exchange it for any card from his hand. To compensate for the benefit of an additional card, the player called to give up the called card has the right to announce and play a Return Bettel (Retour Bettel), also called a Re-Bettel. Otherwise the Mord declarer is allowed to play his announced game. The other three players then form the defending team in a Mord. So unlike a normal game, Mord is not everyone for himself, but one against three. In Mord the declarer leads to the first trick, irrespective of which player is sitting in the forehand position. If the declarer wins, he is paid four blocks by each loser; if he loses, he pays four blocks to each defender. If the declarer opts not to exchange a card, he automatically plays a Herrenmord, in which the stakes are doubled to eight blocks per defender.

==== Bettel ====
If a player believes he can avoid taking any tricks, he can announce a Bettel. Unless a Mord or Herrenbettel is announced, the Bettel announcer becomes the declarer and plays a Bettel. As in Mord, the other three players form the defending team, playing against the soloist. The declarer always plays to the first trick in a Bettel. Each player thereafter must attempt to win the trick if at all possible, i.e. Stichzwang applies. Thus a player can even risk announcing a Bettel if he holds a King, because the corresponding Sow has to be played and will beat it. As soon as the soloist takes a trick, the game is lost. If the declarer wins, he is paid three blocks by each of the defenders; if he loses, he pays three blocks to each defender. If the player of the Bettel feels certain of winning, he can announce a so-called Herrenbettel. That means that after the first trick is played, he must play with all his hand cards revealed. The stakes are doubled for Herrenbettel to six blocks per defender.

==== Schleicher (Schleichmord) ====
If a player has taken all the tricks from the beginning and is sure that he will win the rest, he may announce a Schleicher ("lurker"). However, he must still hold at least three cards in his hand. If the declarer wins, he collects seven blocks from each of the 3 defenders; if he loses he pays seven blocks to each of them i.e. it costs him 21 blocks.

== Austrian variants ==
=== Grünobern ===
The Austrian variant, usually called Grünobern, is played with either 32 or 36 cards from a William Tell pack. It is played in Upper Austria as Grünbubenspiel, Grünoberfangen and Grünoberjagen, as well as in Salzburg and Upper Austria as Grünobern. After each hand, the penalty-earning tricks are turned face up. The pot is divided among the players after a pre-agreed period of time or alternatively saved up for several weeks and used by the players to buy drinks at a so-called 'Grünober Ball'.

Variants:

- All the Obers are worth a penalty point, making at total of seven points per hand.
- Sometimes there is also a rule that forehand (Vordermann) must play a Leaf to the first trick. If he has the Grasober, he must play that.
- The game is played until the pot reaches a certain pre-determined amount of money. Then it is paid out in a reversal of the aim, so that the tricks that were worth penalty points are now worth bonus points.

=== Grünuntern ===
Another Austrian variant is Grünuntern in which the Unter of Leaves or Grünuntern simply replaces the function of the Grünober. It is played in Upper Austria, where it is also called Grünunterjagen, Grünbauernfangen or Grünbauernsuchen, in Lower Austria as Grünbauernjagen and in the state of Salzburg as Grünuntern.

== Eichelobern ==
Eichelobern
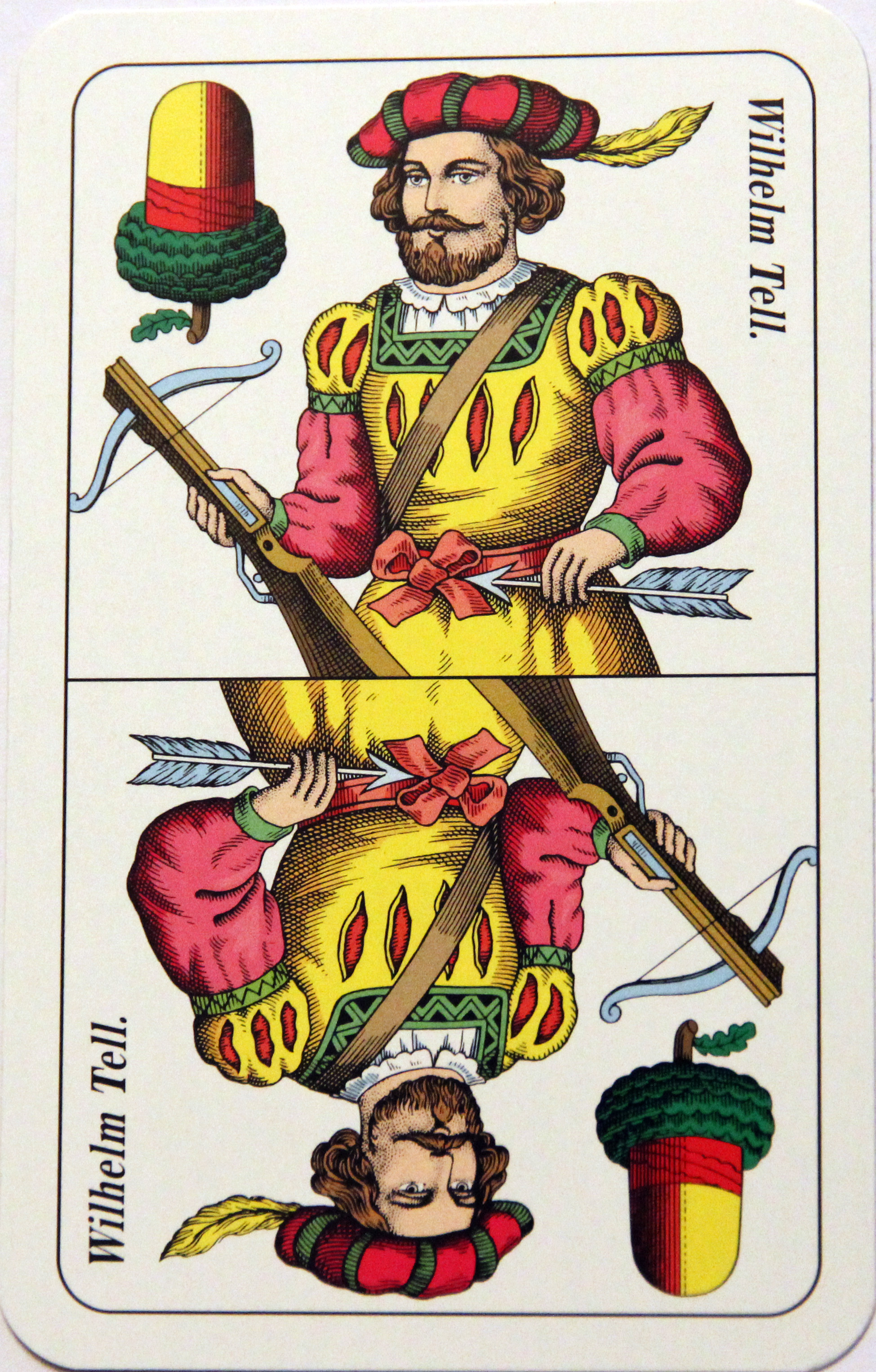
- William Tell as the Eichelober
- Origin: Austria
- Alternative names: Eicheloberln, Schinderhannes, Schinderhansen
- Type: Trick-avoidance, Plain-trick
- Players: 4
- Cards: 32
- Deck: Double German (Tell pack)
- Rank (high→low): A K O U 10 9 8 7
- Play: Clockwise

Related games
- Grünobern (Austrian name for Grasobern)
- Aim: avoid winning 1st and last tricks or capturing the O

Eichelobern is a very similar game played with a Double German pack in the Austrian states of Salzburg, Tyrol and Upper Austria, all of which border on the German federal state of Bavaria.

In this variant, the Ober of Acorns (Eichelober) which, in a Double German pack, depicts the character William Tell, is the penalty card instead of the Ober of Leaves. However, the game is far less widespread than "Grünobern", which is the usual name given to Grasobern in Austria.

Geiser states that the rules are the same as those given by Parlett for Slobberhannes presumably, though, using a German-suited pack. There are 32 cards ranking in their natural order. If five or six play, two 7s are removed. All the cards are dealt and the aim is to avoid taking the first and last tricks or the one with the Eichelober, the Ober of Acorns. Forehand leads to the first trick Suit must be followed if possible; otherwise players may play any card. The highest card of the led suit wins the trick. There are no trumps. One penalty point is scored for the first trick, last trick and capturing the Acorn Ober. If one player is unlucky enough to achieve all three, he or she incurs 4 penalty points or, alternatively, may 'deduct' 4 penalty points. The game may be played for hard score.

The game is also called Schinderhannes or Schinderhansen although this may also be the game of Schinderhansl, a variant of Black Peter played in Bavaria, Germany.

== Literature ==
- Hausler, Manfred (2010). Trommler und Pfeifer: Die Geschichte der bayerischen Spielkarten. Munich, Volk. ISBN 978-3-937200-89-7.
- Korn, Karl (1858). Adolph und Walburg: oder die Tannenmühle eine Erzählung aus dem Anfange dieses Jahrhunderts. Augsburg: Lampart.
- Mala, Matthias (1997). Das grosse Buch der Kartenspiele. Niedernhausen/Ts., Falken. ISBN 3-8068-7333-X.
- Mala, Matthias (2000). Die interessantesten Kartenspiele. Niedernhausen/Ts., Falken. ISBN 3-8068-7515-4.
- Meyer, J. (1852). Das grosse Conversations-Lexicon für die gebildeten Stände, Part 2, Vol. 9. Hildburghausen, Amsterdam, Paris and Philadelphia: Bibliographische Institut.
- Parlett, David (1992). The Dictionary of Card Games. Oxford: OUP.
- Rohrmayer, Erich (2017). Lerne Böhmisch Watten & Grasobern: Eine Spielanleitung für Anfänger. Oberpfalz: Buch + Kunstverlag. ISBN 978-3-9558-7056-0
- Sirch, Walter (2008). Vom Alten zum Zwanzger – Bayerische Kartenspiele for Kinder and Erwachsene – neu entdeckt. Traunstein: Bayerischer Trachtenverband.
