= The Scottish Gallovidian Encyclopedia =

1824 reference work covering Galloway

The Scottish Gallovidian Encyclopedia is a wide-ranging reference work written by John Mactaggart, published in 1824 and reissued after the author's death in a run of 250 copies in 1876. The scope of the work is given by its full title: The Scottish Gallovidian Encyclopedia, or, the Original, Antiquated, and Natural Curiosities of the South of Scotland; Containing Sketches of Eccentric Characters and Curious Places, with Explanations of Singular Words, Terms, and Phrases; Interspersed with Poems Talks, Anecdotes, etc., and Various Other Strange Matters; the Whole Illustrative of the Ways of the Peasantry, and Manners of Caledonia; Drawn out and Alphabetically Arranged.

The work is an important source for Scots lexicography and is cited in 500 entries of the Scottish National Dictionary.
