= Digging Flowers =

Tile-based rummy game, similar to mahjong

- Genres: Mind sport; Tile-based game; Abstract strategy game
- Players: 4
- Setup time: 1–5 minutes
- Chance: Moderate
- Skills: Tactics, observation, memory, adaptive strategies

Digging Flowers (Chinese: 挖花; pinyin: Wā huā; lit. 'dig flowers'), also known as Dachen Mahjong (大陳麻将; Dà chén májiàng) is a tile-based game similar to mahjong and rummy in which four players compete to form their own winning hand of 21 tiles using melds of two- and three-tile sets. Like mahjong, players build their hands by both drawing from a shuffled wall and acquiring discards from other players.

== History ==
The game is thought to have originated in Suzhou, and the pieces are sometimes known as Suzhou flower tiles (蘇州花牌) as a result. It was popular in Jiangsu, Zhejian, and Shanghai during the late Qing Dynasty to the early Republic of China era (c. 1800–1920), when it acquired the pithy saying "Dig flowers every day, but don't touch Mahjong." [天天挖小花，麻將不要搓。]

The game is played as part of a cultural festival in Dachen Village of Hualien City, Taiwan. Dachen Village (大陳一村) was founded in the 1950s following the First Taiwan Strait Crisis.

A version of the game is played amongst Portuguese speakers in Macau, where it is known as Bafá, derived from the Cantonese name for the game.

== Equipment ==
=== Tiles ===
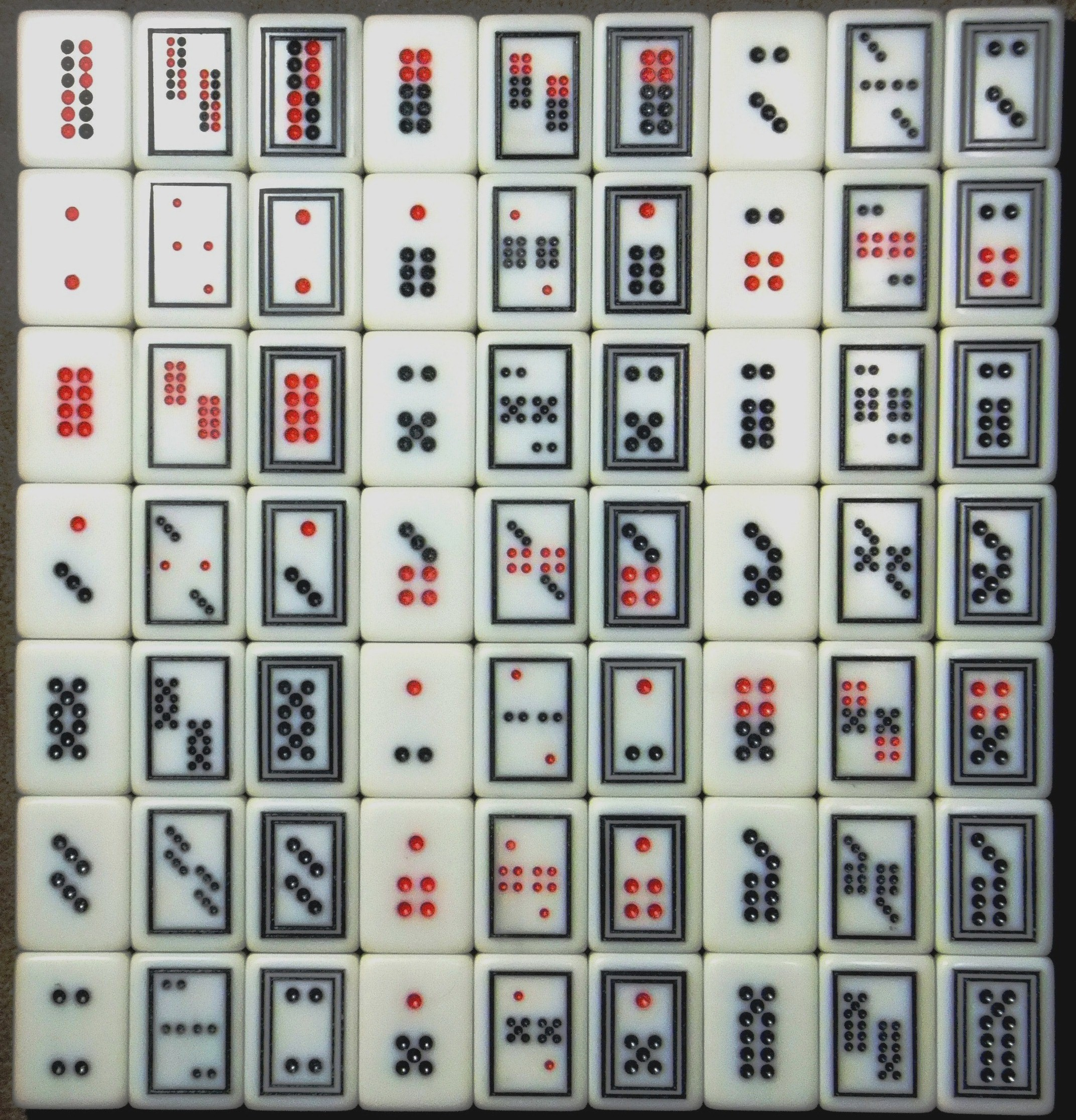
Digging Flowers tiles

The tiles are similar in shape and size to mahjong tiles, but the markings are different. The majority of tiles use the same patterns as Chinese dominoes, which in turn are based on the 21 possible combinations of two six-sided dice. There are three types of tiles for each of the 21 patterns, with six tiles per pattern in total:

Digging Flowers tile types

"Plain"

"Flower"

"Flower" (alt)

"Double"

"Double" (alt)

- 3 "plain" (白皮) pattern tiles with no border
- 2 "flower" (花) pattern tiles with a double border
- 1 "double" or "stacked" (度) pattern tile with a single border and doubled pattern

Variations in markings to distinguish tile types may exist; for example, "flower" and "double" tiles may literally include flowers, "flower" tiles may carry two additional marks rather than the doubled border, and "double" tiles may have a doubled pattern and no border.

In addition to the 126 patterned tiles (21×6), 10 additional tiles may be added: 8 bonus tiles (four seasons, four flowers) and 2 "white dragon" tiles, the same as in mahjong sets. This makes 136 tiles in total.

Digging Flower tile patterns and names
Pattern	Plain	Flower	Double	Name	Pattern	Plain	Flower	Double	Name	Pattern	Plain	Flower	Double	Name
6-6				Heaven (天)	4-6				Four Six (四六)	3-2				Liangshan (梁山伯) (Note: Close homonym for the numbers 2-3 (两三), describing the tile pattern.)
1-1				Earth (地)	1-6				One Six (么六)	2-4				Toad (蛤蟆)
4-4				People (人)	2-5				Nun (尼姑)	2-6				Spend (度)
3-1				Harmony (和)	3-4				Pheasant (野雞)	3-5				Five Cents (毛五)
5-5				Plum Flower (梅花)	1-2				Last Three (三丁)	4-5				Toasting (敬酒) (Note: As an alternative, the 4-5 pattern is also known as wineglass (酒杯). Both of these names include the word for liquor (酒), which is a homonym for the number 9.)
3-3				Long Three (長三)	1-4				One Four (么四)	3-6				Big Knife (大刀)
2-2				Bench (板凳)	1-5				One Five (么五)	5-6				Bull Head (午頭)

=== Dice ===
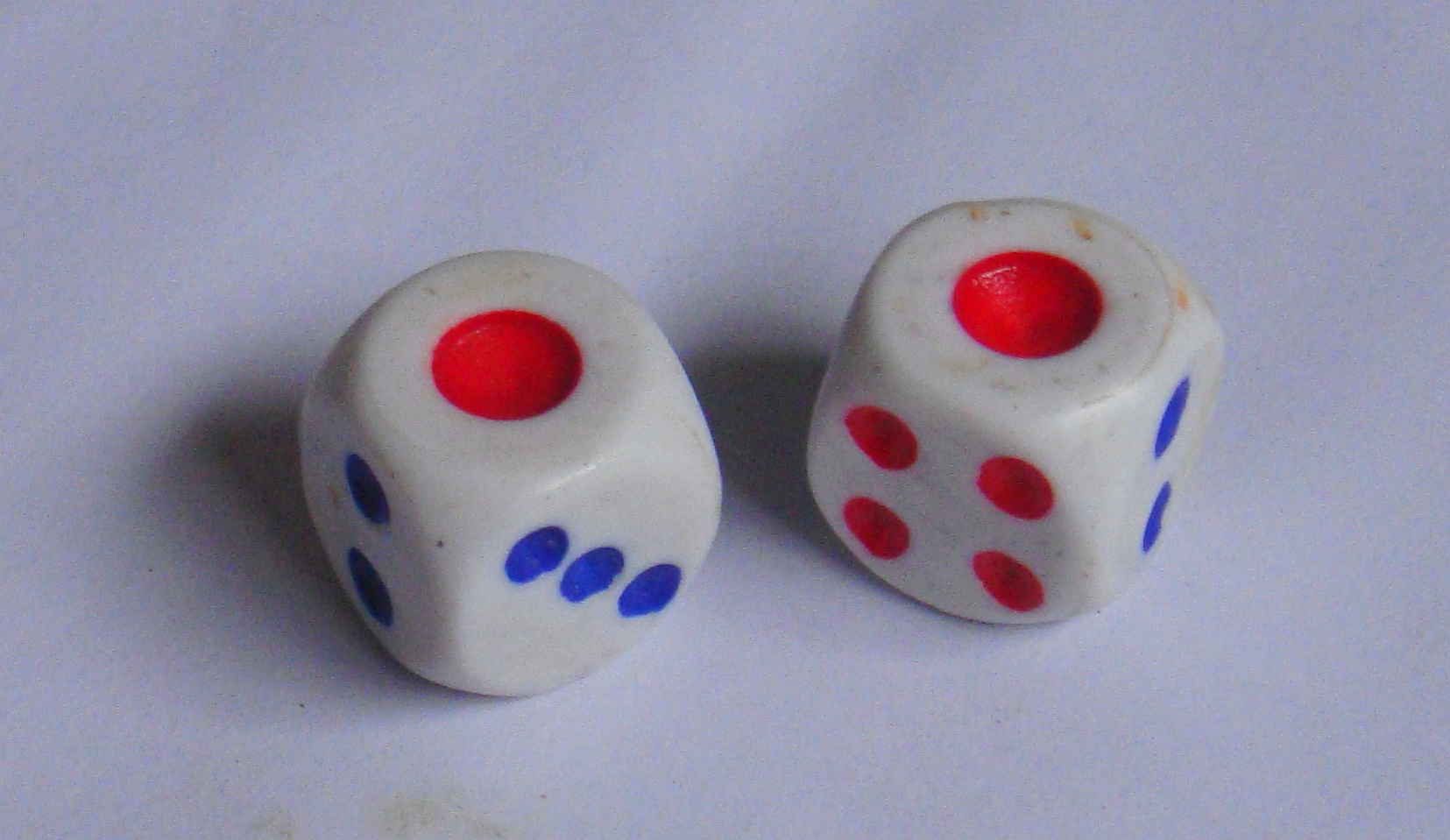
Chinese dice; if this roll (one and one) was used to set the "shake bonus", six and six, and one and six also receive the shake bonus.

Two six-sided dice are used. These use the Chinese marking convention, with the one and four sides marked in red.

== Gameplay ==
One game consists of four separate hands. To start the hand, each player throws the dice and the player with the highest sum is the dealer, sitting in the position designated Heaven (天); moving anti-clockwise (to the dealer's right), the player with the next-highest roll is seated as the Earth (地), followed by the Human (人) and Harmony (和) players, in descending order of dice roll.

Each hand follows the same Heaven (6-6 pattern) - Earth (1-1) - People (4-4) - Harmony (3-1) sequence in turn. Local rules may vary; the fourth player and hand is sometimes designated Long Three (3-3 pattern, 長三) or equivalently Shirt (衫) instead of Harmony.

=== Setup ===
Shake bonus roll combinations
2d6 1d6	1	2	3	4	5	6
1	1-1	1-2	1-3	1-4	1-5	1-6
1	6-6; 1-6	5-6; 3-4	4-6; 2-5	3-6; 2-5	2-6; 3-4	1-1; 6-6; 2-5*; 3-4*
2	2-1	2-2	2-3	2-4	2-5	2-6
2	5-6; 3-4	5-5; 2-5	4-5; 1-6	3-5; 1-6	2-2; 5-5; 1-6*; 3-4*	1-5; 3-4
3	3-1	3-2	3-3	3-4	3-5	3-6
3	4-6; 2-5	4-5; 1-6	4-4; 3-4	3-3; 4-4; 1-6*; 2-5*	2-4; 1-6	1-4; 2-5
4	4-1	4-2	4-3	4-4	4-5	4-6
4	3-6; 2-5	3-5; 1-6	3-3; 4-4; 1-6*; 2-5*	3-3; 3-4	2-3; 1-6	1-3; 2-5
5	5-1	5-2	5-3	5-4	5-5	5-6
5	2-6; 3-4	2-2; 5-5; 1-6*; 3-4*	2-4; 1-6	2-3; 1-6	2-2; 2-5	1-2; 3-4
6	6-1	6-2	6-3	6-4	6-5	6-6
6	1-1; 6-6; 2-5*; 3-4*	1-5; 3-4	1-4; 2-5	1-3; 2-5	1-2; 3-4	1-1; 1-6

The four players collectively shuffle the tiles, face-down, and each builds a wall two tiles high. If only the 126 patterned tiles are used, three of the players build walls 16 tiles wide (32 tiles total), while the dealer (天) builds a wall 15 tiles wide (30 tiles total). When the "white dragon" tiles are included, each player builds a wall 16 tiles wide, and when all ten bonus tiles are included, the walls are 17 tiles wide.

The dealer throws the dice to determine which wall starts the deal, counting clockwise starting with their own wall, then throws the dice again to determine which patterns will receive the "shake" bonus for the hand. The second throw also determines which stack is used to start the draw. The dealer first takes two pairs (four tiles) from the designated wall, then players also take four tiles at a time in order, starting with Earth, until each player has 20 tiles.

=== Shake bonus ===
The "shake rule" (搖張) bonuses are applied to three distinct patterns: one for the face value of the dice, a second for the "base" value, (Note: The value on the base is determined by subtracting each face value from seven. For example, if the face values are one and three, the base values are 4 (=7-3) and 6 (=7-1).) and a third with the leftover numbers. For example, if a one and three are rolled, that means 4-6 and 2-5 are the other bonus patterns. 4-6 is the value on the base of the two dice (four is the base of three, and six is the base of one), and 2-5 are left over after one, three, four, and six are taken out.

When doubles are rolled, the "base" double and the mixture of the face and base receive the shake bonus. For example, if a two and two is rolled, the "base" is 5-5, and the mixture is 2–5; all three of these patterns are the designated shake bonus patterns for the hand.

As a special case, whenever the sum of the dice add to 7, the doubles of the face pips and the other combinations of 7 are the five designated bonus patterns for the hand. For example, if a one and six is rolled, the "base" value is 6-1 again; the five shake bonus patterns in this case are the doubled rolls (1-1 and 6-6) and all three seven-sum patterns (1-6, 2–5, and 3–4). This is called "Seven Stars". By examination, the "leftover" pair always sums to seven, so at least one of these seven-sum patterns is always a designated shake bonus pattern. (Note: The sum of all six distinct faces on a single die is 1+2+3+4+5+6=21. Let a=face value of die 1 and b=face value of die 2. That means the respective "base" values are equal to (7-a) and (7-b), so if x is the first leftover and y is the second leftover, then we know the sum of the possibilities a+b+(7-a)+(7-b)+x+y must also be equal to 21. This expression simplifies to 14+x+y=21 or x+y=7; that is, the "leftover" pair always sums to 7. In the case where a=b, then the "base" pair is (7-a) and (7-b)=(7-a) and the "mixed" leftover pair is a and (7-a), which always sums to 7.)

=== Pattern ranks ===
Certain patterns are assigned ranks, which can change from hand to hand; ranks also affect scoring. Permanently designated "medium rank" (中張) patterns are the 2-2, 5–6, 3-3, (Note: The medium rank bonus applies to the 3-3 patterns when 3-1 is the designated fourth hand pattern. Likewise, the medium rank bonus applies to the 3-1 patterns when 3-3 is the designated fourth hand pattern.) and 4-6 patterns. Permanent "small rank" (小張) patterns include the sevens (1-6, 2–5, 3–4), unless one or more of those patterns are designated by the shake bonus, in which case the shake bonus is applied instead. "Large rank" (大張) patterns include all other patterns not designated small or medium rank. Depending on the rules, the "civil" suit of patterns, as defined in Chinese domino games like Tien Gow and Pai Gow, may be placed in the "large" or "medium" ranks. These include patterns 6-6, 1-1, 4-4, 3–1, 5-5, 3-3, 2-2, 5–6, 4–6, 1–6, and 1–5.

Because each hand has a designated pattern (in sequence: 6-6, 1-1, 4-4, and 3-1 or 3-3), that pattern is a member of the "large rank" for that hand; this designation changes with the hand. The other three patterns are designated "medium rank".

=== Turns ===
For each player's turn, play proceeds as in mahjong: the player draws a tile from the end of the wall to start their turn, and ends it by discarding a tile. Alternatively, if a player can take the discard from the preceding player (the player seated to the left), they may do so in lieu of drawing from the wall, but they still need to end their turn by discarding a tile. Each player maintains a separate discard area in front of their hand. A player may take a discard out of sequence if it is the tile they need to win.

Unlike mahjong, which uses three- and four-tile matching sets or sequential runs, the basic unit of Digging Flowers is a two-tile pair, which match strictly by pattern, not border. For instance, a 3–4 with a double border will match with a 3-4 without a border. However, it is advantageous to group bordered tiles together.

If a player has more than two tiles with the same pip pattern, the extra(s) are discarded, starting with the plain tiles without a frame. Once a player has formed a set of two (or three) with a pattern, that player is not allowed to form another set with the same pattern.

If the player forms a double-white pair with two plain tiles, it cannot be broken in later turns to form a higher-valued pair using a framed (flower or double) tile with the same pattern. Three-tile combinations are possible only with the three framed tiles of a given pattern. When a player forms a three-tile set (翹), whether by drawing a tile or "eating" a discard, that set must be displayed to the other players.

Sample lyric for the 2-5 "nun" tile

二五要去劫法場,
八妹改扮道姑樣,
聽得號炮三聲響,
法場救出七兄長。
[When I went to court on the 25th,
eighth sister dressed up as a nun;
hearing three cannon blasts,
seventh brother was rescued from execution.]

— Dachen tutorial

Players often sing short songs when making plays, as demonstrated in Pai Hsien-yung's short story "The Eternal Snow Beauty" in his 1971 collection Taipei People.

=== Winning and payout ===
After a player declares they have completed their hand and displays ten pairs with distinct patterns (or another combination totaling 20 tiles) along with a trump tile (堂頭/亡) with a different pattern that was drawn from the wall or "eaten" from a discard, each player computes the total number of points in their hand. The winner of that hand is the player that has the highest points, which is not necessarily the first player to complete their hand.

The winner is paid according to the difference between their hand and each player's hand. The player with the second-highest points must pay the winner, but they in turn are paid by the third- and last-place players. Similarly, the third-place player pays the first- and second-place players, and is paid by the last-place player according to the relative difference in scores.

=== Scoring ===
Base multipliers (Dachen rules)
Name	Combination	Pattern rank			
Name	Combination	Shake	Large	Medium	Small
Caution (翹)	Double + Flower + Flower	64×	16×	8×	4×
Full Set (正抱)	Double + Flower	32×	8×	4×	2×
Flower Set (花抱)	Flower + Flower	16×	4×	2×	1×
Half Set (半抱)	Double + Plain	16×	4×	2×	1×
White (花皮)	Flower + Plain	8×	2×	1×	1×
Double White (白皮抱)	Plain + Plain	4×	1×	1×	1×

In general, the difficulty of achieving a combination, coupled with the pattern ranks and shake bonus determine the multiplier for the number of points awarded for specific combinations. Because the game is not widely played, there are few official published rules and variations of the scoring rules may apply, specific to the regions or even families where the game is played.

Two-tile combinations are scored differently according to which types of tiles are included. Actual base point values may vary by game and local rules, but generally the points double for each framed card (whether "flower" or "double") in the set. That is, the combination of two "plain" tiles earns the base value, while a {"plain" and "flower"} or {"plain" and "double"}, adding one framed card, would earn twice the base value, and a {"flower" and "flower"} or {"flower" and "double"} would earn double that, for four times the base value.

In addition, the designated shake bonus pattern(s) receive an additional 2×–4× point multiplier during that hand, depending on custom and rules.

Also, the designated hand pattern can receive the same 2×–4× point multiplier, which stacks with any other multipliers already in place. For example, during the (first) Heaven hand, the 6-6 pattern receives this multiplier. Earth (second hand) is 1-1, People (third) is 4-4, and Harmony (fourth) is 3–1. Alternatively, under some rules, the player's seat designates which patterns receive the bonus multiplier, so for instance the Heaven player would receive a bonus for completing a set with the 6-6 pattern.

The single "trump" tile used to complete a hand is added to the final score, but only for the player who completed the hand. Similar score-doubling rules may apply, depending on whether the trump tile is plain, flower, or double type.

Because there are many mental formulas for scoring, players often recite them by singing during the scoring phase.
