= Khanhoo =

Chinese card game

- The Chinese game of khanhoo
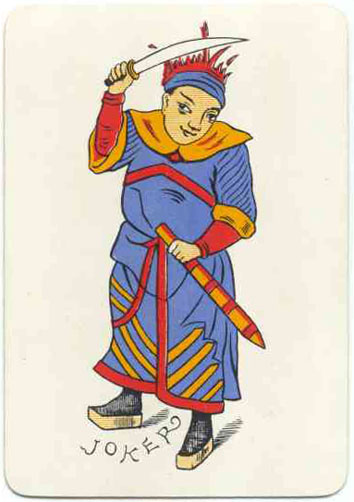
- The Joker in an 1891 set produced by Charles Goodall of London
- Origin: China
- Type: Matching
- Family: Rummy
- Players: 2-8
- Skills: Tactics and strategy
- Cards: 2-4 decks of 30 cards with or without a joker
- Play: Clockwise
- Playing time: 20 minutes
- Chance: Medium

Related games
- Tổ tôm

Khanhoo or kanhu is a non-partnership Chinese card game of the draw-and-discard structure. It was first recorded during the late Ming dynasty as a multi-trick taking game, a type of game that may be as old as Tien gow (Tianjiu "Heaven and Nines"), revised in its rules and published in an authorized edition by Emperor Gaozong of Song in 1130 AD for the information of his subjects. Meaning "watch the pot", it is very possibly the ancestor of all rummy games.

Adapted to the western taste by Sir William Henry Wilkinson, British sinologist and Consul-General in China and Korea from 1880 to 1918, it belongs to the same family as Mahjong. Another related game is Kuwaho or Cuajo from the Philippines. Variants of the Qing version of the game are still played in China and Vietnam such as Tổ tôm.

== History ==
During the Ming dynasty, the game was called 看虎 (Pinyin: "kanhǔ") meaning "watching the tiger" or "dǒuhǔ" (斗虎), "competing with the tiger". It was a multi-trick game where players try to take tricks with one or three cards with the latter composed of different types of melds.

By the late Qing dynasty, the rules as recorded by Wilkinson and Stewart Culin had changed considerably. The game was now called "kanhú", "watching the lake" (看湖) or "watching the pot" (看壺). It was no longer a trick-taking game but a draw-and-discard game. However, there were vestigial remnants in the composition of the melds.

The changes may have occurred during the 18th and 19th centuries when trick-taking fell in favour of shedding type games like mòhú (默和) and pènghú (碰和) which are regarded as the ancestors to mahjong. The various homonyms of hu, whether they mean harmony, pots, or points is equivalent to "meld".

A similar related card game in the Philippines is known as Cuajo in Spanish and English, and Kuwaho in Filipino/Tagalog, which Manuel (1948) points to Hokkien Chinese: 看好; Pe̍h-ōe-jī: khòaⁿ-hó.

== Ming version ==
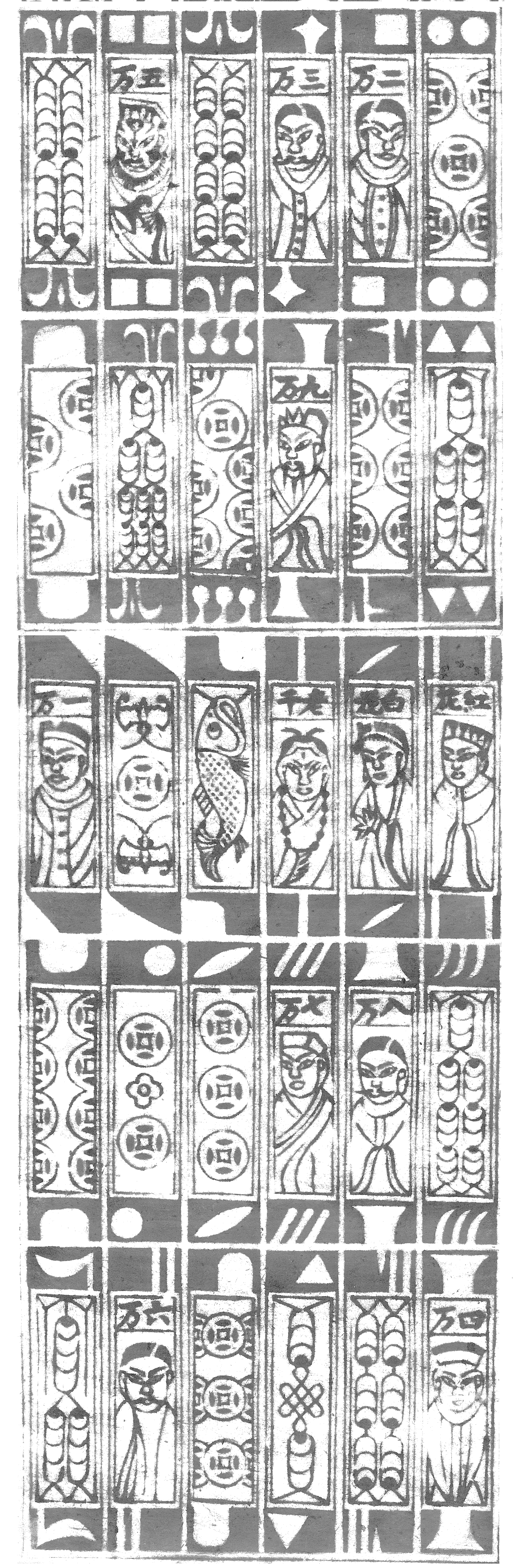
Money-suited 30-card deck

The original Ming game was a multi-trick-taking game for two or three players. The following rules were written by Pan Zhiheng in 1613. It uses a madiao deck but strips it of the suit of Tens with the exception of the Thousand Myriad card. The remaining thirty cards are arranged from lowest to highest:

- Cash (11 cards): 9 Cash to 1 Cash, Half Cash, Zero Cash (this suit is in reverse order like in madiao)
- Strings of Cash (9 cards): 1 to 9 Strings
- Myriads of Strings (10 cards): 1 to 9 Myriad, Thousand Myriad

Like all Chinese card games, play is counter-clockwise. The eldest is chosen by drawing the highest card. If there are two players, each will get 13 cards with four going to the stock, which is not used. With three players, each gets nine cards with three going to the stock. The eldest can lead with singles or three card melds, others follow with the exact number of cards. Each captured card is worth 1 point but there are bonus points for method of capture. If singles are thrown, it can be beaten by a card from a higher suit; an exception is the Thousand Myriad which can only beat other Myriads. Winning with the 5 Myriad awards 2 bonus points while winning with the 8 Myriad gives 3 bonus points.

Three types of melds can be led:

- Gibbons: Three-card sequences from the same suit that can be beaten by Gibbons from a higher suit or a higher Gibbon from the same suit. Having a Gibbon in a higher suit is more important than its rank. Remember that Cash Gibbons are in reverse order. The Half Leopard (sequence of 1, Half, Zero Cash) beats all String and Cash Gibbons. Winning with the Half Leopard or with the Thousand Myriad Gibbon (8, 9, Thousand Myriad) awards 1 bonus point.
- Leopards: Three of a kinds that can only be beaten by higher Leopard or the Hero. A meld of three 1s is called Leopard 1 and goes up to Leopard 9.
- Special: If a special combo is led, it can only be beaten by higher specials. Winning with any special awards bonuses. From lowest to highest:
  - Pangolin (3 points): 7 Cash, 3 Strings, 3 Myriad (Pan witnessed its invention sometime between 1609-1613)
  - Poverty (4 points): 8 Cash, 2 Strings, 2 Myriad
  - Tiger (5 points): 9 Cash, 1 String, 1 Myriad
  - Chariot (6 points): Zero Cash, 9 Strings, Thousand Myriad
  - Leopard 9 (7 points): 9 Cash, 9 Strings, 9 Myriad
  - Wealth (8 points): Zero Cash, 9 Strings, 9 Myriad
  - Hero (9 points): 1 String, 1 Myriad, Thousand Myriad

== Qing version ==
=== Suits ===
This game is played by two or more persons with one complete pack of one hundred and twenty cards. There are four copies of each card. The three suits in the deck are:

- Cash: From 1 to 9 Cash. This is in progressive order.
- Strings of Cash: From 1 to 9 Strings
- Myriads of Strings: From 1 to 9 Myriad

The three extra cards that act as wild cards:

- Red Flower: Originally the Zero Cash
- White Flower: Half Cash
- Old Thousand: Thousand Myriad

=== Melds ===
In the Qing version of the game the following triplets are called ngán (eyes) which are descended from Ming special combos:

- 1, 2, and 3 Cash
- Red Flower, 9 Strings, Old Thousand (Compare with the Chariot)
- White Flower, 8 Strings, 9 Myriad (2nd highest cards of each suit under the Ming ranking)
- 9 Cash, 1 String, 1 Myriad (Tiger)
- 8 Cash, 2 Strings, 2 Myriad (Poverty)
- 8 Cash, 3 Strings, 2 Myriad (According to Culin)/ Red Flower, 9 Strings, 9 Myriad (Tcheng Ki-tong and Wilkinson, compare with Wealth)
- 7 Cash, 3 Strings, 3 Myriad (Pangolin)

A winning hand must contain at least one of the above combinations called "eyes" and the remaining cards must be arranged in one or more combinations called pát tsz (boys), a sequence of three or more cards of the same suit, or three cards of the same rank. All aces (1s), the red flower, white flower, and old thousand, may be added to these "eyes", to the sequences or triplets to form a winning hand. The dealer is chosen by drawing a card from the pack and counting the players up to the number of the card drawn. The dealer deals the first card to themself and fourteen others to each of the players, so that in the end the dealer has fifteen. As this is the number needed for a winning hand, and the dealer alone has this number, they are the only player with the chance to win on the cards dealt to them. Either they win or they discard one card to the player on their left who now has the chance to take that card or buy one from the stock to see if they win or discard. The third player then has their turn of play and so on. The first to show a winning hand composed of "eyes", sequences and combinations, wins the game, usually played for money bet in a pot.

== English version ==
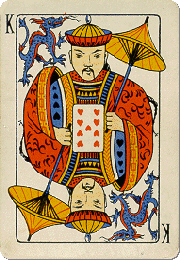
The King holding the 9 ♥

In 1891 Sir William induced the card maker Charles Goodall to issue a special pack of cards with accompanying booklet of rules to play khanhoo. The deck contained two sets each of Ace through Nine of Hearts, Clubs and Diamonds, with two specially designed Jacks, Queens and Kings standing in for the "extra cards" and two Jokers. As the years passed, his passion for the game became so great that in his last books he was designated as William "Khanhoo" Wilkinson.

=== Deck of cards ===
The money-suited packs can be adapted from two English 52-card decks, removing all cards ♠, except for the J's ♠, Q's ♠ and K's ♠, and the 10s, J's, Q's, K's ♦, ♣, ♥. Add one Joker and a khanhoo 61-card deck will have been formed.

=== Game play ===
Distribute fifteen cards one by one or in batches of two or three to each player and stock the remaining cards face down to the table to form a stock pile. In turn, the first player draws, melds if possible and discards one face up to the table to form a waste pile. Then the next player draws, melds if possible and discards one to the table.

If a thrown card suits any of the players, it must be melded immediately so that all the other players can see why that player needed that card. But if a player draws a card from the stock pile, it needs not to be shown until they are able to lay all their cards at once.

The aim of the game is to get rid of all cards by melding them. The first player to do so is granted 5 points and the first to reach a pre-agreed number of points, such as 50 or 100 points, wins the match, which can be achieved in two or three games.

=== Meldings ===
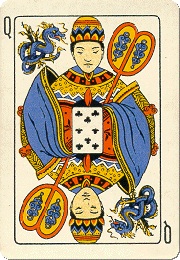
The Queen holding the 8 ♣

SCORES
Three A's, being two of the same suit	Aces	1 point
Three cards or more of the same suit melded in sequence	Sequence	1 point
Three cards of the same rank, each one from a different suit	Triplet	2 points
Six cards of the same rank	Double Triplet	10 points
J ♠, Q ♠, K ♠	Courts	3 points
J's ♠, Q's ♠, K's ♠	Double Courts	10 points
J ♠ + 7's ♦	J's Royal Group	4 points
Q ♠ + 8's ♣	Q's Royal Group	4 points
K ♠ + 9's ♥	K's Royal Group	4 points
A ♥ + 2 ♣ + 3 ♦	Khanhoo	5 points
A's ♥ + 2's ♣ + 3's ♦	Double khanhoo	15 points

=== Scores ===
In a game of less than 5 players, the best possible hand would score 29 points (besides 5 for full hand): double khanhoo (15 points), any Double Triplet (10 points) and any one of the Royal Groups (4 points) equals 29 points.

The smallest possible score would be 2: Two sequences of 9 and 6 cards or two of 8 and 7 cards respectively. Though sequences score so little they are of great use in filling a hand. Not only does a long sequence take up a large proportion of the 15 cards, but a sequence of more than 3 cards is exceedingly useful, as either a card can be thrown away in order to declare full hand, or used in a triplet, without spoiling the sequence.

=== Playing for money ===
At the close of a game players may pay or receive the difference between their scores, as at Skat. Thus if A wins with 52 when B stands at 49, and C and D at 47 each, A receives 3 from B and 5 each from C and D, or 13 in all - B 2 each from C and D, 4 in all, less their 3 paid to A, or a net sum of 1. C and D pay in all 7 each, 5 to A and 2 to B, receiving nothing, as they tie for last place. Points may be anything, from counters to bank notes.

=== Penalties ===
The penalty for a misdeal is to be deducted from the dealer's score or added to that of each of their opponents, at the option of the latter. Dealing out of turn is not considered a misdeal, nor is the exposure of a card while dealing. In the former case the rightful dealer may claim the deal at any time before the first card is dealt; in the latter, the player whose card is exposed may call for a new deal.

In a three-to-four-hand game, a player calling "bump" may be challenged by any of their opponents to show their cards, and if the cards shown would not make a trick with the card thrown, 5 points are taken from their score or added to the score of each of their opponents, and the elder hand which effected the bump may take the trick into their hand as though they had not gained it by bumping. The cards shown by the offender are not, however, considered exposed and may be used to form tricks.

=== Strategy ===
Khanhoo is not only a game of chance, depending on the distribution of the cards or the sequence in which the cards are being drawn. It is also a game of skill and expertise, especially in a two-handed game.

==== Evaluation ====
- Consider if you have too many pip cards to go for a quick knock or if you have top ones like the 7 ♦, 8 ♣, 9 ♥, A ♥, 2 ♣, 3 ♦, enough Courts or even a Joker to take the game further.

==== Memorization ====
- Remember the cards that have already been played, so that you know which combinations can not be formed anymore.

==== Analysis ====
- Take into account that during the play many top cards may be drawn from the stock pile or thrown by the other players, changing the course of your strategy. This will force you to decide which cards should be thrown and the implication of your decision.
- Note that whoever knocks is granted 5 points and that may be crucial for the advantage in the game.
- With three, four or more players, cards that might safely be thrown in the two-hand game are often dangerous because an opponent can now bump. In such games it is most advisable to hold the two 7's ♦, the two 8's ♣ or the two 9's ♥, since the chances are that someone will throw the J, Q or K (as the case may be), enabling you to bump.
- The Joker is the most valuable card in the pack, since it may take the place of any card required, even of one all specimens of which have been played.
- The deal is not necessarily an advantage to the dealer; hence the penalty for a misdeal is a fine and not the passing of the deal.

=== Variation ===
A variation of the game can be played by using three decks comprising 90 cards, plus two Jokers to form a new sequence of meldings.

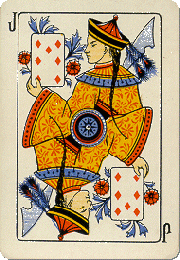
The Jack holding the 7 ♦

SCORES
Nine A's, three of each suit	Triple Aces	6 points
Nine cards of the same suit	Triple Sequence	3 points
Nine cards of the same rank, three from each suit	Triple Triplet	9 points
Three J's ♠, Q's ♠, K's ♠	Triple Courts	12 points
Two J's ♠ + 7 ♦	J's Reverse Group	4 points
Two Q's ♠ + 8 ♣	Q's Reverse Group	4 points
Two K's ♠ + 9 ♥	K's Reverse Group	4 points
Three J's ♠ + three 7's ♦	J's Triple Sequence	8 points
Three Q's ♠ + three 8's ♣	Q's Triple Sequence	8 points
Three K's ♠ + three 9's ♥	K's Triple Sequence	8 points
Three A's ♥ + three 2's ♣ + three 3's ♦	Triple khanhoo	25 points

=== Features ===
Deck

There are only three suits in the deck: Nine cards from Ace through Nine, six Courts and one Joker (One Joker in a 2-hand game or two in a 3-hand game), which can replace any card.

Special cards

Only the A ♥, 2 ♣ and the 3 ♦ may be used to form a khanhoo, and only the 7 ♦, 8 ♣ and the 9 ♥, with their respective Courts, may be used to form a Royal Group.

Deal

Players cut for the deal, the lowest card winning. Each player receives fifteen cards dealt one at a time or in batches of two or three. The player sitting left of the dealer receives one extra card and has the privilege of leading first. Where the number of players is 4 or 8, the player who cuts the highest card may, before the cards are dealt, elect to go "orphan". In this case they receive six cards dealt one at a time. Should they happen to be the original leader, they will receive an extra card making seven in all.

Direction of play

The game of khanhoo moves clockwise.

Stock

All discarded cards are placed face upwards on the table in order of rejection, so that the previous-last card is covered by the last one played. When the stock is exhausted before a full hand is declared, the heap of rejected cards is turned over, so as to face downwards on the table, forming a new stock then.

Bump

In a game for three players the possession of a thrown-out card may be claimed by the third player seated to the right of the player who discarded that card, once they can meld it immediately, after which the game proceeds in the order of play. If four or more players take part in the game, two or more players may request the throw-out card once their meld, except for a "sequence", scores higher than any other, having preference to the card the player in the order of play sitting left to the player who discarded that card. This action is called "bump" because one of the players is bumped by another.

Four-to-five-hand game

The four-hand game can also be played with one complete pack of 120 cards, plus one Joker. If five or more play, up to five Jokers may be added, each additional one increasing the element of chance in the game. The game proceeds exactly as in the case of three players.

Orphan khanhoo

When four or more players take part in the game, the highest card may elect to go "orphan". There will be then a stock of nine cards left. The game proceeds exactly as with three players, except that there are now two or more players who can bump, instead of one. But for the first and second players, either the third, fourth or the other players in the order of play may claim this privilege, the fourth player being subjected to the third and the third to the challenge of the second. The superior trick, declared in number of points, gets the bump in whomsoever hand it may be, although with equal combinations the elder hand has the first right to bump in the order of play.

Trio, quartette and cache

The following additions to the number of possible tricks may add an interesting feature to the game:

- Trio: Three cards of the same suit and rank equals 6 points.
- Quartette: Four cards of the same suit and rank equals 12 points.
- Cache: When any of the players has a natural "trio" obtained without bumping, that player may place them face downwards on the table and declare them to be a "cache". Upon the fourth card being thrown by any of the other three players, they are then entitled to bump it and claim "Quartette by Cache", scoring in addition to the 12 points for quartette, 5 more for full hand. The play ceases, counting begins and a new deal takes places, just as though the player had knocked. A natural "quartette" also has this privilege, without the need for Cache.

== See also ==
- Four color cards
- Rummy
- Mǎ diào
- Tổ tôm
