= Khorol (game) =

Mongolian tile-based game

Khorol or Khorlo (Mongolian: Хорол or Хорло) is a multi-trick tile-based game played in Mongolia, Inner Mongolia, and Tuva, usually on Lunar New Year's. It is played between two and eight players with four being the most common. The game appeared during Manchu rule (1645-1912). It is similar to the game of Daaluu (Даалуу) played with a double set of Chinese dominoes.

== Composition ==
The most common set consists of 60 tiles, usually made from wood. There are 17 different types of tiles ranking from highest to lowest:

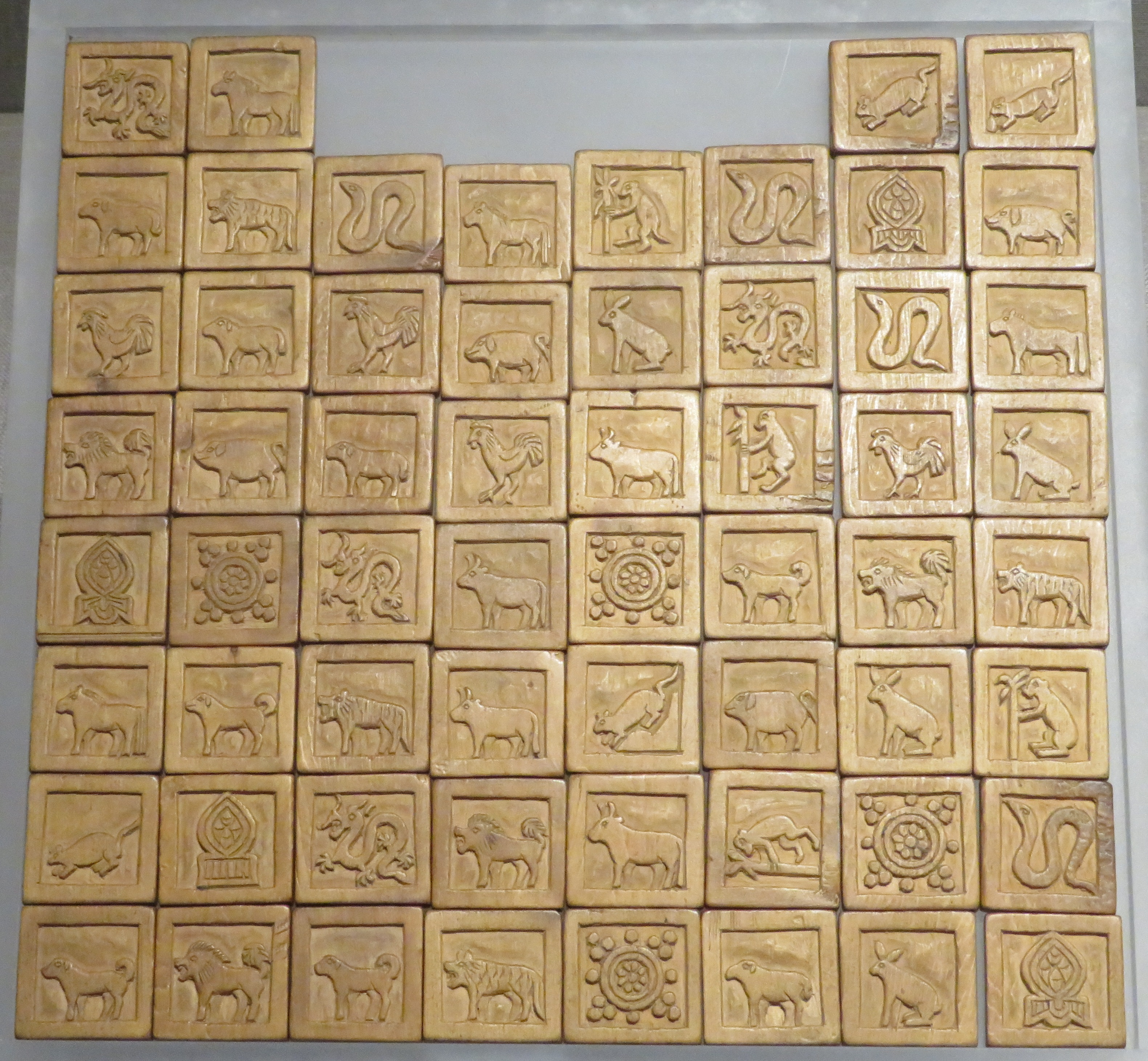
Set with Chinese zodiac tiles

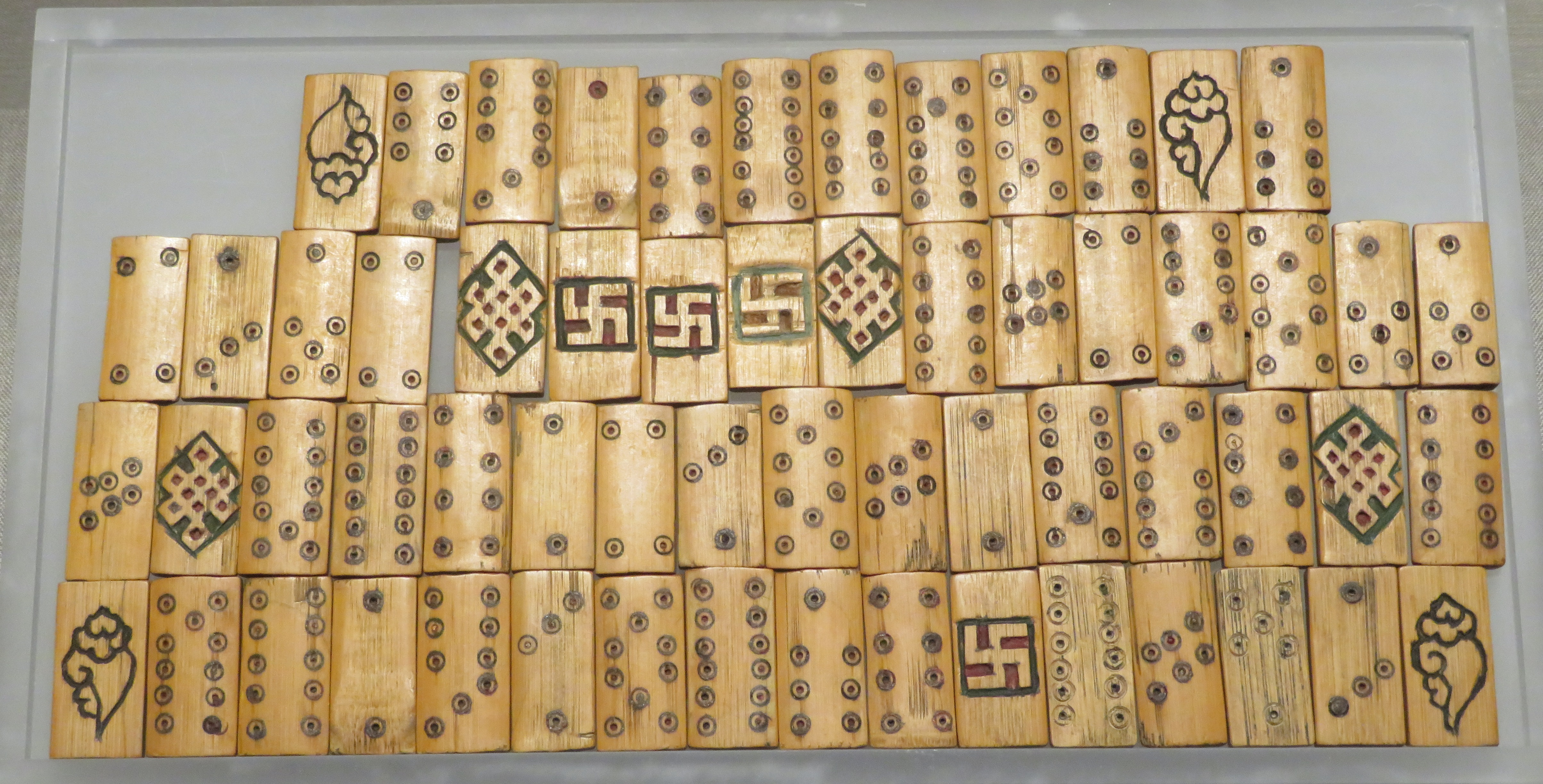
Set with domino tiles

1. Khorol
2. Norov
3. Khas
4. Khangarid
5. Sengi
6. Rat
7. Ox
8. Tiger
9. Rabbit
10. Dragon
11. Snake
12. Horse
13. Goat
14. Monkey
15. Rooster
16. Dog
17. Pig

There are four copies of each rank except for the Dragon, Rooster, Dog and Pig which only have two. Less common sets may forgo the Khas and Norov ranks in exchange for having every remaining rank with four tiles. Older sets may have more ranks taken from the Ashtamangala such as the endless knot, pair of fish, and conch. Numbers 6 to 17 are the signs of the Chinese Zodiac; Tuvans play the game with domino tiles instead. The earliest versions of both types of sets lacked the Ashtamangala tiles.

== Rules ==
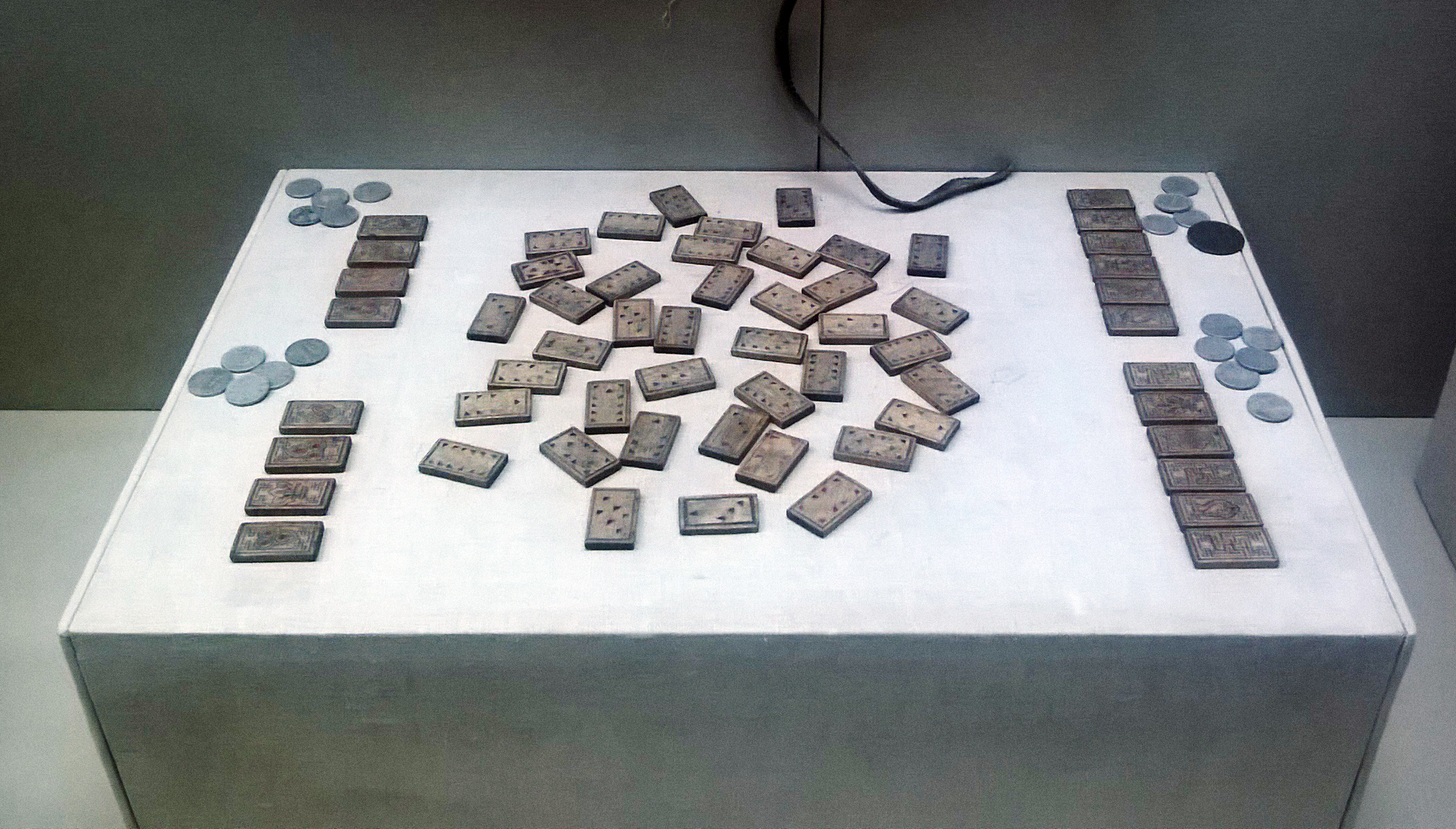
Domino version with jetons

It can be played with or without partnerships. In four player games, tiles are shuffled face down and evenly distributed to all players. With 15 tiles in hand, the eldest can lead with the trick with one, two, three, or four identical tiles. In a clockwise fashion, the following players must put down an identical number of tiles but only sets of a higher rank will prevail. Players are also able to slough losing tiles face down (this is characteristic of some trumpless trick-taking games like Tien Gow and Ganjifa). The winner of the trick will lead the next one. The goal is to capture as many tiles as possible. There are minor regional variations with their own special rules.

In older versions of this game, only single and double tricks were allowed. The rules of Khorol and Tien Gow appeared to have evolved in tandem and the Mongol and Tuvan game may be a simplification of the Chinese domino game.

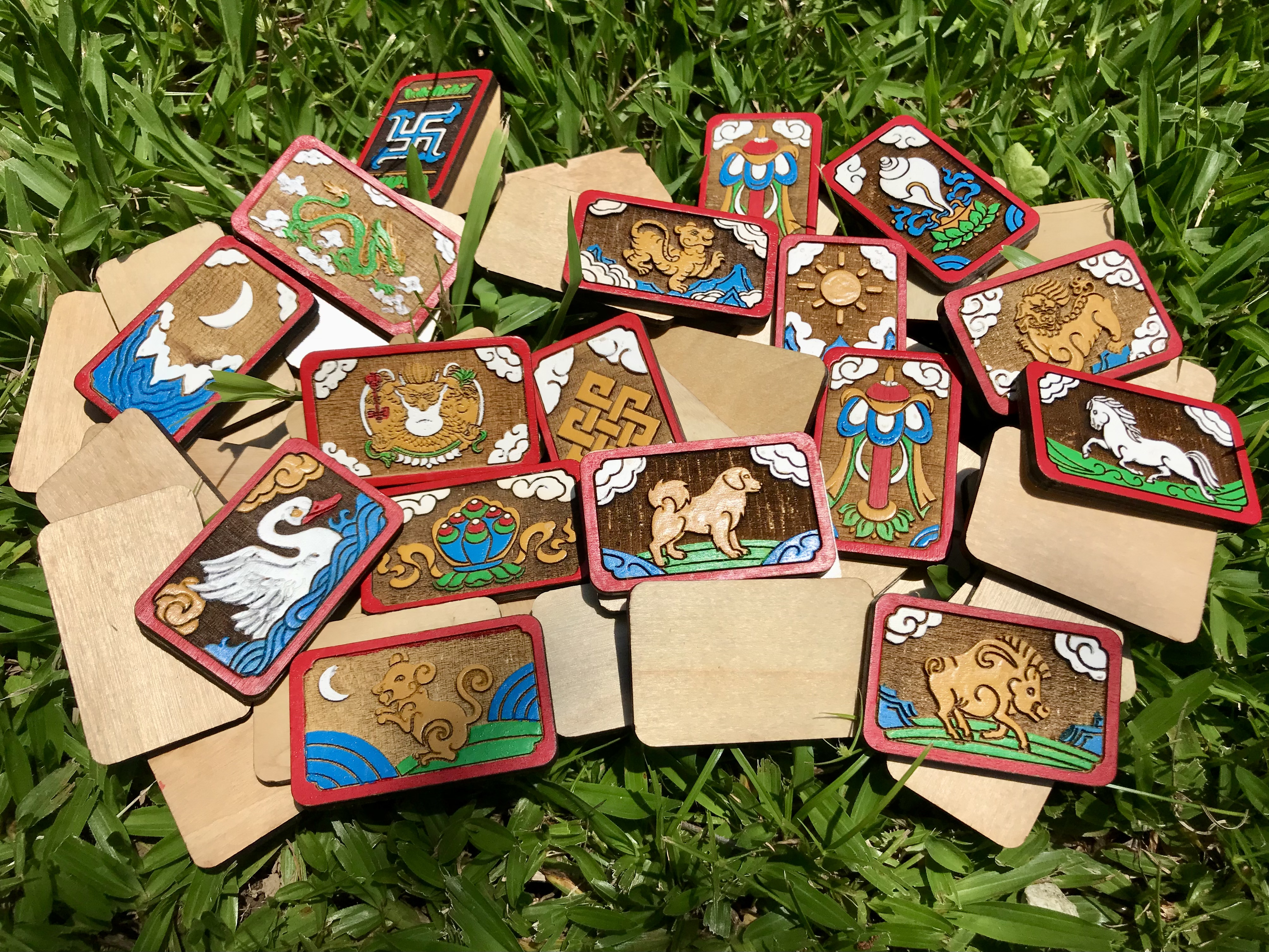
A set of Khorol variant
