= Kiu kiu =

Indonesian domino game

Kiu kiu or qiu qiu is a game of dominoes popular in Indonesia related to pai gow. It may also be referred to as 99 domino poker.

It is played using a set of (28) double-six dominoes, which in Indonesia typically take the form of small cards, which are discarded after a few games as they show signs of wear.

Players are typically required to pay a fixed ante into a pot, and are then dealt three domino cards. After evaluating their cards each player in turn may either bet (if there is no previous bettor), call (if there is a previous bettor), raise (if there is a previous bettor), or fold.

If there was only one bettor in the first round, the game ends and the bettor takes the pot without showing his cards. Otherwise all players who did not fold are dealt a fourth card, following which there is a second and final round of betting. Both the first and second rounds of betting are typically subject to limits, with a higher limit for the second round.

After the final round of betting, then each player who did not fold must in turn expose his cards and declare his hand. The player with the highest hand takes the pot.

The four cards are formed into two pairs where the pips on each pair are summed, and only the last unit's digit is considered. For example, a pair of 6-6 and 6-5 has a pip total of 23, so the value becomes 3, or a pair of 6-4 and 5-4 has a pip total of 19, so the value becomes 9 (or 'kiu'). Pairs are compared such that the higher pair is compared first, and then the second pair. So this example would be a kiu-3 and not a 3-kiu. The highest pair formation possible is therefore a kiu-kiu (9-9).

There are three special hands ranking above a pair of nines, from highest:

1. High (total pips on four dominoes equal to or above 38 - house rules may vary this number)
2. Low (total pips on four dominoes equal to or below 9 - house rules may vary below this number)
3. 4 doubles (four double dominoes)

A fourth special hand ranks below qiu-qiu, but above all other non-special hands:

- Straight (four dominoes whose pips have consecutive pip totals, e.g., 6-1, 5-3, 5-4, and 6-4 have pip totals of 7, 8, 9, and 10 respectively; note this hand could also be declared as (the lower ranking) kiu-5)

An exception to the rule of forming hands into pairs is the case of three doubles; this is also considered a 'kiu', hence the fourth card is considered alone.

If two players both have a straight, or two pairs with the same value, then the higher hand is the one with the higher double, or if neither player has a double, the highest straight.

Players may employ both mathematics and bluffing tactics in determining when to bet or fold. For example, a player who is dealt three doubles after the first round already has a 'kiu', at a minimum and has a chance to draw fourth double, or a qiu-qiu, and should never fold. On the other hand, a player holding 5-4 (9), 3-2 (5) and 4-1 (5), can at best improve to qiu-four (with either 3-1, 2-2, or 4-0), which if many players are playing, is likely to be a losing hand, so he can do no better than hope to steal the pot, if action is folded to him.

== See also ==
- Glossary of domino terms
