= Gold Mine (board game) =

The Game of Exploration, Riches & Peril
- Designers: Chris James
- Illustrators: Andy Kurzen
- Publishers: Stratus Games
- Publication: July 2010
- Years active: 2010 to present
- Genres: Family, Tile-laying
- Players: 2 to 6
- Setup time: 1 minute
- Playing time: 30 to 60 minutes
- Age range: 8+
- Website: Gold Mine website

Gold Mine is a tile-laying board game for 2 to 6 players, ages 8 and up. It was designed by Chris James and published by Stratus Games.

In the game, players excavate a maze of mine tunnels by placing tiles that represent the features of an underground mine. Players also control miniature miners who traverse the mine collecting gold. In addition, miners can traverse secret passages, challenge other miners for gold, and direct bats toward other miners to chase them away from their current position in the mine.

The object of the game is to be the first to collect a certain number of gold nuggets and exit the mine.

== Components ==
- 100 game tiles
  - 1 Mine Entrance tile
  - 28 Gold Chamber tiles
  - 67 Mine Tunnel tiles
  - 4 Cavern tiles
- 28 Gold Nuggets
- 18 Gold Challenge tokens
- 18 Bat Challenge tokens
- 6 Miners
- 2 dice

The Miners are plastic miniatures that are roughly 1 1/8 inches tall and 1/2 inch in diameter. The Miners consist of various colors (red, green, blue, yellow, black and white) and depict a pudgy, faceless miner complete with overalls, large boots, pickaxe and helmet with a head lamp.

The Gold Nuggets are durable plastic gold nugget-shaped pieces that are roughly 1/2 inch long in all directions.

Each game tile is 1.75 inches square and 2 millimeters thick. The Mine Tunnel and Gold Chamber tiles contain various configurations of tunnels, with each side having zero, one, or two exposed mine tunnels. The Cavern tiles depict a natural cavern, complete with stalactites. Gold Chambers depict a large room with golden floors and walls to represent a gold vein. The Mine Entrance tile depicts an open space, similar to a Cavern, with a ladder leading out of the mine and an 'Exit' sign. All tiles share the Gold Mine logo on the reverse side, except for the Mine Entrance, which depicts an exterior mine entrance with an "Enter" sign and a ladder leading down into the mine.

Both types of Challenge tokens are 3/4 inches in diameter and 2 millimeters thick. Gold Challenge tokens depict a Gold Nugget placed in front of two criss-crossing pickaxes. Bat Challenge tokens depict a group of attacking bats.

== Setup ==
Game setup consists of shuffling all of the tiles and forming several stacks of tiles, face down. A stack of exactly 20 tiles is used first for the Development Mining phase of the game. Each player chooses a Miner and is dealt three of each type of Challenge token. A starting player is then chosen and the game begins.

== Gameplay ==
Players begin the game by placing 20 tiles to form the initial mine configuration. The Mine Entrance tile serves as the starting tile. Valid tile placement consists of placing tiles along a grid formation so that mine tunnels and walls on all adjacent tiles connect properly. Cavern tiles can be placed adjacent to any tile, regardless of the tunnel formation. Any tile with a single or double mine tunnel configuration may be placed next to the Mine Entrance tile, as long as none of the tunnels are blocked or form a loop.

Whenever a Gold Chamber tile is placed, a Gold Nugget is immediately placed on the center of the tile for later collection by a Miner.

After the first 20 tiles have been placed, players place their Miner on the Mine Entrance tile and try to collect the required number of Gold Nuggets (which ranges from 5 to 10, depending on the number of players). A valid turn consists of a Miner Movement phase and a Miner Action phase.

During the Miner Movement phase, a player may choose one of the following movement options:

- Place a tile and move one space
- Roll a single die and move up to that number
- Traverse a Secret Passage

Miners move through connected tunnels on adjacent tiles, with each tile boundary costing one movement point. Miners may pass each other during movement, but may not jump across gaps between disconnected tunnels.

Water-carved Secret Passages are found on 15 different tiles and are represented by a crevice and puddle of water. A Miner must be standing next to a Secret Passage at the beginning of a turn in order to attempt to traverse it. To traverse a Secret Passage, both dice are rolled. If doubles or a sum of seven is rolled, the Miner may traverse safely. If not, the Miner may move up to the lower number rolled in the usual manner.

After the Miner Movement phase is finished, the Miner Action phase occurs, in which the player may collect a Gold Nugget and/or initiate a Challenge against another player. To initiate a Challenge, a player must declare which player is being challenged and discard either a Gold Challenge or Bat Challenge token. Each type of challenge requires both the challenger and defender to roll a die three times in a row. The winner is the player who rolled higher two out of the three rolls (with ties going to the challenger).

A Gold Challenge allows a player to attempt to dislodge a Gold Nugget from another Miner who is currently standing in the same location. The winner of the Challenge collects a Gold Nugget from the loser and places it on any empty Gold Chamber tile. If the challenger is the winner, the player may roll a single die and move up to the number rolled (in order to attempt to collect the gold first).

A Bat Challenge allows a player to attempt to direct bats toward any other Miner, anywhere in the mine, in order to chase him away from his current position. The winner of the Challenge may roll a single die and move the other player's Miner up to the number rolled.

=== Winning ===
The first player who collects at least the required number of Gold Nuggets and returns to the Mine Entrance tile wins the game. For 2 players, 10 gold nuggets are required; for 3 to 4 players, 7 are required; for 5 to 6 players, 5 are required.

=== Optional rules ===
Several rule variations are included in the Gold Mine instructions (Mud Puddles, 5 Tile Strategy, and Alliances), with many other official and community-submitted rules collected on the publisher's website.

== Awards ==
2010

- Fifty Best Products Award - The Toy Man Product Guide
- Q4 Top Ten Award - The Toy Man Product Guide

2011

- Parents' Choice Recommended
