= Hive (game) =

Tabletop abstract strategic board game

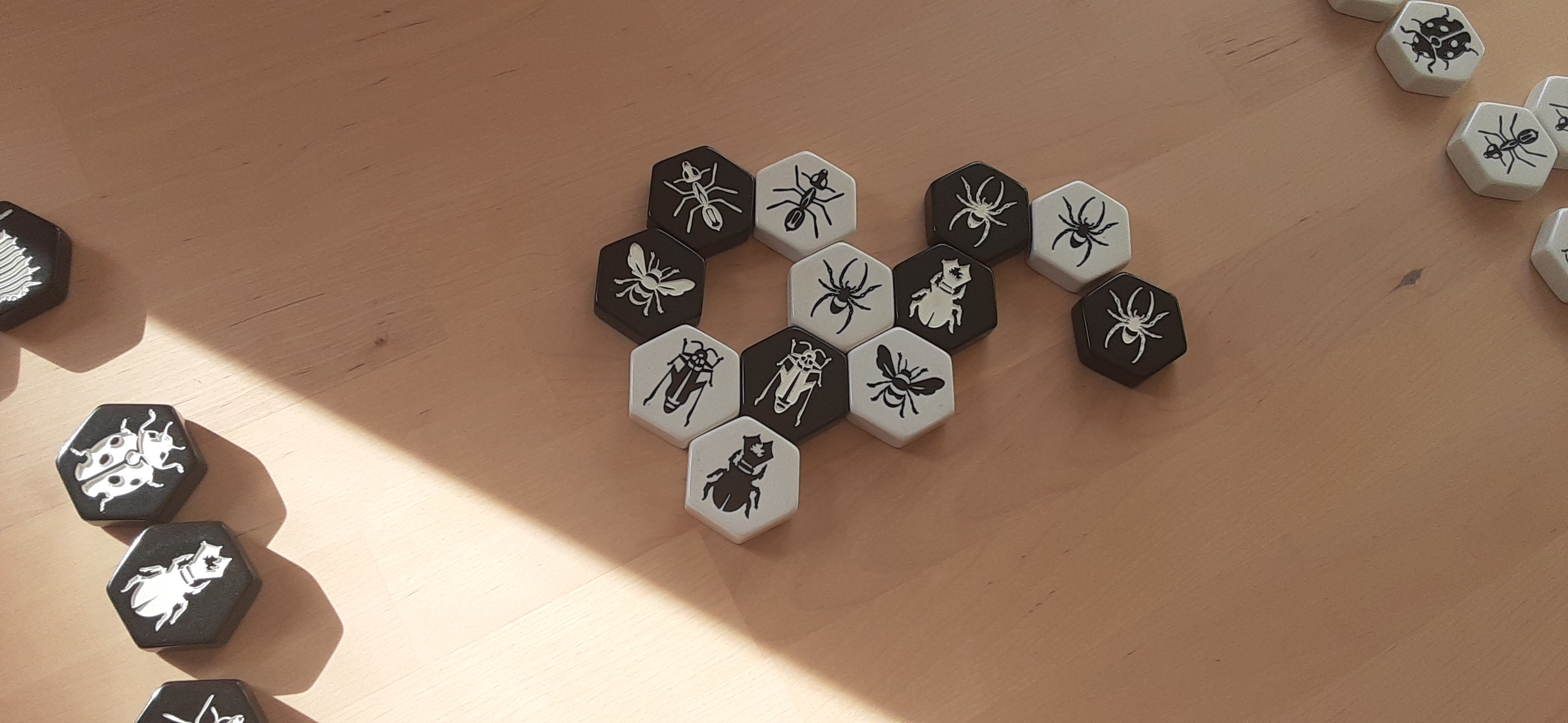
- A Hive game setup
- Designers: John Yianni
- Publishers: Gen42 Games
- Players: 2
- Playing time: 20 minutes
- Chance: None

Hive is a bug-themed tabletop abstract strategy game, designed by John Yianni and published in 2001 by Gen42 Games. The object of Hive is to capture the opponent's queen bee by having it completely surrounded by other pieces (belonging to either player), while avoiding the capture of one's own queen. Hive shares elements of both tile-based games and board games. It differs from other tile-based games in that the tiles, once placed, can then be moved to other positions according to various rules, much like chess pieces.

== Composition ==
The game uses hexagonal tiles to represent the various contents of the hive. The original two editions used wooden tiles with full-color illustrations on blue and silver stickers to represent the units, but the current third edition has been published using black and almond phenolic resin ("Bakelite") tiles with single-color painted etchings.

There are 22 pieces in total making up a Hive set, with 11 pieces per player, each representing a creature and a different means of moving (the colors listed are for the third edition of the game; the first and second used full-color drawings):

- 1 Queen Bee (Yellow-Gold)
- 2 Spiders (Brown)
- 2 Beetles (Purple)
- 3 Grasshoppers (Green)
- 3 Soldier Ants (Blue)

In addition, one or more of these expansion pieces may be optionally added to the game:

- 1 Mosquito (Gray)
- 1 Ladybug (Red)
- 1 Pillbug (Cyan)

The game is packaged with a travel bag (a black drawstring bag for older editions; a nylon zippered case for the current version) to make the game more portable. Given the durability of the tiles and the lack of a board, the game is marketed as a "go-anywhere" game that simply needs any flat surface on which to place pieces.

=== Variations ===
Gen42 Games released a "Carbon" edition of Hive in 2011, which features a monochrome design of black creatures on white pieces, and white creatures on black pieces. Tiles for the Mosquito and Ladybug expansions are included in this set. The following year, they released a lower-priced "Pocket" edition of Hive. The pieces are smaller versions of the colored Bakelite tiles, and include the Mosquito and Ladybug expansions. The game is sold with an orange drawstring bag for storage.

== Gameplay ==
=== Setup and placement ===
The game starts with an empty layout, with all of both players' pieces in stacks or otherwise arranged as each player prefers. It confers little or no advantage to conceal the faces of unplaced pieces; both players have "perfect information" about the state of the game, and thus by process of elimination any piece not on the board is yet to be played. The official rules do not specify that a specific player color begins; either white (similar to Chess) or black (similar to Go) may play first and players may alternate first turn between games without swapping pieces.

On each turn, a player may place a new piece from their supply, or, if their Queen Bee has been placed, move a piece according to its function. A new piece, when placed, must be adjacent to only the player's pieces; it cannot touch any of the opposing player's pieces. The only exception to this rule is the first piece played by each player; the first played piece by definition cannot be adjacent to anything, and the other player's first piece must be adjacent to the first player's piece (see the "one hive rule" in the Movement section below). Once placed, a piece may be moved to a new space regardless of what pieces it will touch, except that it must be adjacent to at least one other piece.

After the Queen Bee has been placed, a player is at liberty to place or move at will; as pieces are placed, the layout, known colloquially as the "hive", gets larger, and pieces become surrounded by others. The strategy in placing tiles is thus usually to wait to place stronger tiles until they have a strong chance of not being immediately trapped.

The Queen Bee must be placed in one of the first four turns. It can be preferable to place the Bee before being forced on the fourth turn because the player cannot move any pieces until after the Queen Bee is placed. In an effort to reduce the number of drawn games, Tournament rules (but not the official Hive rules) disallow placement of the Queen Bee on the first turn.

=== Movement and pieces ===
Movement of pieces in Hive is governed by the hexagonal shape of the tiles. Tiles must be situated such that one face of a tile contacts the face of an adjacent tile, and a movement of one "space" equates to a shift to a different (imaginary) hex-shaped area that is adjacent to both the current space and to one other piece. The game has no actual board, however it can be thought of as being played on an infinite plane of tessellated hexagons.

A major rule in Hive is the One-Hive Rule; a piece may never be moved such that during or after its movement, there are two separate groups of pieces in play. Even if as a result of the piece's move, the layout remains one group, if the hive becomes disconnected while the piece is in transit the move is illegal.

With two exceptions, moves are made around the circumference of all pieces of the layout, and a piece may never move into or out of a hex that is almost completely or completely surrounded (known as the Freedom to Move Rule). The two exceptions to both are noted below.

The movement of the pieces is as follows (number in parentheses indicates number of each piece type per player):

- The Queen Bee (1) is the most limited in movement; she can only move one space at a time in any direction.
- The Beetle (2), like the Bee, can move only one space at a time. However, unlike the Bee, a Beetle can also climb on top of any adjacent piece, and then if the player so wishes can move one space at a time over the top of the layout. The piece under the Beetle cannot move as long as the Beetle remains on top, and for the purpose of placing new tiles, that space is the color of the Beetle's tile, not the underlying tile. Beetles can move on top of other Beetles even when that Beetle is atop another piece; theoretically a stack 5 tiles high can be constructed, with all four Beetles atop some other tile. A Beetle on top of the layout can crawl back down onto the edge of the board, or into any surrounded space.
  - The Beetle does have an often-overlooked movement restriction, a variation of the Freedom to Move Rule; a Beetle may not move directly between two adjacent hexes if doing so would require passing through a gap between two stacks of pieces that are both higher than the origin hex (without the Beetle on it) and the destination hex.
- The Spider (2) can move exactly three spaces around the circumference of the layout. Even when the layout becomes larger, the Spider, when positioned correctly, can still affect the game significantly.
- The Grasshopper (3) is, like its namesake, a jumping piece; it moves by jumping over any number of pieces in a straight line to the first adjacent space on the opposite side of the line of pieces. It always jumps in the direction of one of its faces, never one of its corners. Because of this mode of movement, it can quickly traverse from one side of the layout to the other, and like the Beetle it can move into a surrounded space.
- The Soldier Ant (3) may move only around the edge of the layout, like the Bee or Spider, but unlike the two, it may move any number of spaces, i.e. as many spaces as the player wishes.
- The Mosquito (1) is a piece that acquires the power of any piece (allied or opponent) adjacent to it. If the Mosquito is adjacent to a Grasshopper, for example, the Mosquito can move like a Grasshopper. If the Mosquito climbs atop the Hive using Beetle powers, the Mosquito can only move as a Beetle until climbing down onto the main level of play. If a Mosquito is touching another Mosquito, each Mosquito only gets the powers of the pieces immediately adjacent to itself; a Mosquito can't inherit powers through another Mosquito.
- The Ladybug (1) is a piece that moves by temporarily climbing on top of the board and climbing back down to the main layer of the board. The Ladybug moves exactly three spaces; first atop an adjacent piece, then onto another piece, and finally down to an empty space next to the second piece it was on.
- The Pillbug (1) can move a piece next to itself to a free space that is also next to itself. The action happens in two steps. Step 1: The Pillbug lifts the piece out of the Hive. Step 2: The Pillbug places the piece into a free space next to itself. These two steps are important to understand because the Pillbug cannot break the one-Hive rule. That is to say, it cannot move a piece essential to the Hive. There are a few other restrictions for the Pillbug as well: the Pillbug cannot move a piece if either the Pillbug or that other piece is covered; the Pillbug cannot move a piece if that piece was moved in the most recent turn; the Pillbug cannot move a piece if the Pillbug itself was moved in the most recent turn; the Pillbug cannot move a piece through a Beetle gate (if there are two Beetles creating a gate on the second layer of the Hive).

In the official online version of the game, if a player cannot make any legal move then their turn passes and the other player moves twice (or more) in a row.

=== Endgame ===
The game ends when a Queen Bee is captured by surrounding it on all 6 sides by either player's pieces, and the player whose Queen Bee is surrounded loses the game. The game is a draw if a move results in the simultaneous surrounding of both Queen Bees, or in a situation where each player's best move for a turn leads to an endless cyclical repetition of a series of moves (this situation is known as stalemate).

=== Tournament Opening Rule ===
In 2009, the Tournament Opening Rule was introduced in response to the high number of draws in the 2008 World Championship. This rule forbids the placement of the Queen on either player's first turn. It has been implemented as standard on BoardSpace.net and HiveGame.com, and as an option on BoardGameArena.com.

With the introduction of Hive Ultimate in 2024, The Tournament Opening Rule has become official.

== Openings ==
There are many possible opening strategies, but two main formations are recommended by the game's publisher (when playing without any expansion pieces). They are reproduced below in order of placement:

- Spider–Bee–Ant (in a V formation with the spider at the point): This is a flexible opening that allows the Bee maximum movement possibilities while also quickly introducing a powerful Ant that can move as needed to block or trap. Beetle-Bee-Ant and Hopper-Bee-Ant are common variations that replace the first Spider with a piece that can still move when surrounded and is thus less likely to be trapped for the entire game.
- Bee–Spider–Spider (in a V formation with the Bee at the point): This is an aggressive quick-strike opening that allows the player the fastest possible opportunity to move (on the third turn if necessary); the Spiders can thus quickly block the opponent's opening pieces. In addition, if the opponent answers with the same or a similar opening, it provides the best opportunity to force a draw if necessary as the Bees are adjacent. For this last reason, tournament rules forbid the placing of the Bee on the first move, as this opening leads to a preponderance of draws. Bee-Spider-Ant is a common variation very similar in its mechanics.
  - As of 2024 with the release of Hive Ultimate, this opening is illegal for casual play as well as tournaments.

Other openings include beginning with a Beetle or Grasshopper; depending on how the Hive's shape evolves, a Beetle or Grasshopper may be able to climb or jump out of its original position, when the Bee, Spider or Ant would likely be trapped for the entire game in a similar situation.

As mentioned before, it is generally considered unwise to leave the placement of the Bee until the fourth turn; not only can placed pieces not move, but the player risks being forced to play an extended string of pieces that can be easily trapped. It is also unwise to play an Ant as the first piece; this piece is likely to be trapped and/or surrounded for the entire game, and thus the player is forced to play short one Ant, placing them at a severe disadvantage.

== Expansions ==
In 2007 a promotional expansion was released that consisted of a new Mosquito piece for each player. This game piece can be added to each player's supply before the game begins. The Mosquito acts as a sort of "wild card" piece; once played, the Mosquito takes on the characteristics of any other piece it touches at the time, so that its movement and abilities change during the course of the game. For instance, if a mosquito is located adjacent to a Grasshopper and an Ant, it can either jump over a line of pieces as the Grasshopper moves, or move around the circumference of the hive as an Ant. That move may place it adjacent to a Beetle, Spider and the Queen Bee; if it moves again it can do so as any one of those three. The only exception to this rule is that if it is moved on top of the hive (as a Beetle moves), it retains the abilities of a Beetle until it moves down off of the hive again.

In 2010, a Ladybug expansion was announced. It was presented at Essen 2010. The Ladybug moves three spaces; two on top of the Hive, then one down. It must move exactly two on top of the Hive and then move one down on its last move. It may not move around the outside of the Hive and may not end its movement on top of the Hive. This expansion was released in early 2011, first on electronic versions of the game for iPhone and on the Hive website, then as part of the Hive Carbon edition, and finally as an expansion set for the 3rd edition Bakelite set.

In January 2013, the Pillbug was announced as a possible expansion piece, and has since been added to the game. It was designed as a defensive piece, to counteract the other two offensive expansions and to give the second player a bit of an advantage. The Pillbug moves exactly like the Queen. In addition, the Pillbug has the special ability, in lieu of moving, to pick up and move another bug of either color. When doing so, the Pillbug picks up an adjacent piece and places it into a different, unoccupied space adjacent to itself. This special ability may, for example, be used to rescue a friendly Queen on the verge of being surrounded. The Pillbug may not move a bug which was just currently moved by one's opponent in the immediately preceding turn. All standard rules apply to the Pillbug. The Mosquito adapts to both the movement and special power of the Pillbug.

=== Hive Ultimate ===
In 2024, Gen42 games introduced Hive Ultimate, which includes all three expansions and officially implements the Tournament Opening Rule. .

== Digital adaptations ==
In 2013, an online game adaptation of Hive was developed by Cédric Leclinche, Antoine Tallotte, and Elena Laskavaia. It is available as a free-to-play multiplayer game via boardgamearena.com.

BlueLine Games released their digital adaptation in 2013. The cross-platform Steam version of Hive includes all expansions and can be played in multiplayer and single-player mode. The Xbox Live Indie Game release was called H.I.V.E. and did not include the expansions.

A mobile app for Android has been released under the name Hive with AI (board game). It is developed and maintained by JB Chaubet.

In May 2024, a new website was made available for free on-line play. hivegame.com

== Competition ==
=== Online Hive World Championship ===
John Yianni, designer of Hive, has recognized the annual tournament held at first at www.BoardSpace.net, and then beginning in 2025 at www.hivegame.com as the Online Hive World Championship. Here is a list of winners:

Year	Champion	2nd	3rd	4th	Note	Ref
2007	woswoasi (Peter Danzeglocke); Germany	goulo (Russ Williams) Poland zugzwang (Quinn Swanger) USA			Classic Hive (no expansions), without Tournament Opening Rule.	
2008	ahchong (Sean Chong); Malaysia	Eucalyx (Christian Sperling); Germany	GRMikeS (Mike Schell)USA humdeabril (Dimitri BR) Brazil		All games played with Mosquito, without Tournament Opening Rule.	
2009	EddyMarlo (Edwin de Backer); Netherlands	humdeabril (Dimitri BR) Brazil	Loizz (Luiz Flávio Ribiero) Brazil	Raccoons (real name N/A)Germany	First tournament with Tournament Opening Rule.	
2010	EddyMarlo (Edwin de Backer); Netherlands	Loizz (Luiz Flávio Ribiero) Brazil	Seneca29 (Dario Delfino) Italy		Game one of each match played without Mosquito, remaining games were player's choice.	
2011	ringersoll (Randy Ingersoll) USA	DrRaven (Jason Wallace)USA	EddyMarlo (Edwin de Backer) Netherlands; Fumanchu (Dimitris Kopsidas) Greece		First tournament with Ladybug. All games played with Ladybug. Game one no Mosquito, other games were player's choice.	
2012	Fumanchu (Dimitris Kopsidas) Greece	Eucalyx (Christian Sperling)Germany	ringersoll (Randy Ingersoll) USA	BLueSS (Jon) USA	First game of each match was Classic Hive. Remaining games were player's choice.	
2013	image13 (蔡慶鴻 Tsai Ching Hung) Taiwan	Eucalyx (Christian Sperling)Germany	stepanzo (Stepan Opalev) Russia	kkurtonis (Tino Mihaljavic) Croatia	First tournament with Pillbug. First game of each match Pillbug only. Other games were player's choice.	
2014	Eucalyx (Christian Sperling)Germany	stepanzo (Stepan Opalev) Russia	Quodlibet (Christian Galeas Arce) Chile image13 (蔡慶鴻 Tsai Ching Hung) Taiwan		Round 1 Mosquito only. Round 2 Ladybug only. Round 3 Pillbug only. Round of 16 P+L. Quarter Finals P+M. Semi Finals L+M. Finals P+L+M.	
2015	Quodlibet (Christian Galeas Arce) Chile	nevir (Tom Fyfe) USA	tanksc (Lizihao) China; Bechster (Henrik Bechstrøm) Norway		First tournament that required all three expansions, Pillbug+Ladybug+Mosquito.	
2016	tzimarou (Dimitrios Kampilakis) Greece	Quodlibet (Christian Galeas Arce) Chile	Eucalyx (Christian Sperling)Germany	Jewdoka (Joe Schultz)USA		
2017	Jewdoka (Joe Schultz)USA	Eucalyx (Christian Sperling)Germany	Quodlibet (Christian Galeas Arce) Chile stepanzo (Stepan Opalev) Russia			
2018	Quodlibet (Christian Galeas Arce) Chile	Jewdoka (Joe Schultz)USA	HappyKiwi (Patrik Berggren)Sweden; Pseudomon (Povilas Šimonis)Lithuania			
2019	Quodlibet (Christian Galeas Arce) Chile	Jewdoka (Joe Schultz)USA	Loizz (Luiz Flávio Ribiero)Brazil	Dube (Frank Chen)USA		
2020	Jewdoka (Joe Schultz)USA	Quodlibet (Christian Galeas Arce) Chile	Dube (Frank Chen)USA	Eucalyx (Christian Sperling)Germany		
2021	Quodlibet (Christian Galeas Arce) Chile	Dube (Frank Chen)USA	stepanzo (Stepan Opalev) Russia	Gandac (Ion the Romanian Juggler) Romania		
2022	Jewdoka (Joe Schultz)USA	stepanzo (Stepan Opalev) Russia	Frasco92 (Francesco Salerno) Italy	Gandac (Ion the Romanian Juggler) Romania		
2023	Jewdoka (Joe Schultz)USA	aenorman43 (Alex Norman)USA	HappyKiwi (Patrik Berggren)Sweden	csigeee (Olivér Lelkes)Czech Republic		
2024	spfish (Ben Harris)United Kingdom	HappyKiwi (Patrik Berggren)Sweden	Jewdoka (Joe Schultz)USA	csigeee (Olivér Lelkes)Czech Republic		
2025	DrBeeezz (Joël Bezemer)Netherlands	Jewdoka (Joe Schultz)USA	OrdepCubik (Pedro Álvarez Ruiz-Dorizzi)Spain	InDusDusDus (András Csőke)Hungary	First year the tournament was played at www.HiveGame.com	

=== Mind Sports Olympiad ===
==== 2020 ====
In 2020, with the COVID-19 pandemic affecting travel and in-person gatherings, the Mind Sports Olympiad was held virtually. This allowed the organizers to increase the number of games in the competition. One of the games added was Hive. Hive competition for 2020 took place at www.BoardGameArena.com.

Hive with all expansions and standard opening rules

GOLD: Ben Nanda, USA

SILVER: Christian Galeas, Chile

BRONZE: -Ilie 27-, nationality N/A

Hive with all expansions and tournament opening rule

GOLD: Christian Galeas, Chile

SILVER: Alexey Kytmanov, Russia

BRONZE: Joe Schultz, USA

Hive classic with tournament opening rule

GOLD: Patrik Berggren, Sweden

SILVER: Piotr Lewandowski, Poland

BRONZE: Francesco Salerno, Italy

JUNIOR GOLD: Rubėn Pons Serra, Spain

==== 2021 ====
In 2021, the Mind Sports Olympiad was again held virtually. Hive competition for 2021 took place at www.BoardGameArena.com.

Classic Hive

GOLD: Christian Galeas, Chile

SILVER: Eugen Konkov, Ukraine

BRONZE: Francesco Salerno, Italy

Tournament Hive (with all expansions)

GOLD: Eugen Konkov, Ukraine

SILVER: Joe Schultz, USA

BRONZE: Zakhar Krasnov, Russia

== Reviews ==
- Family Games: The 100 Best
- Rebel Times #8

== See also ==
- Abstract strategy game
- Chess
