= Tile-based game =

Type of tabletop game using tiles

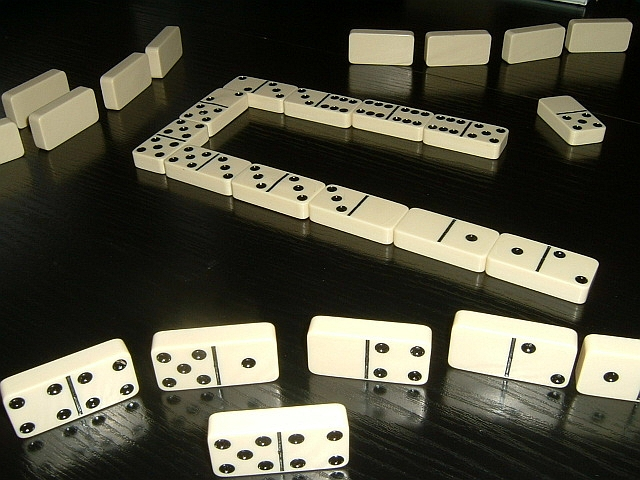
A game of dominoes

A tile-based game is a game that uses tiles as one of the fundamental elements of play. Traditional tile-based games use small tiles as playing pieces for gambling or entertainment games. Some board games use tiles to create their board, giving multiple possibilities for board layout, or allowing changes in the board geometry during play.

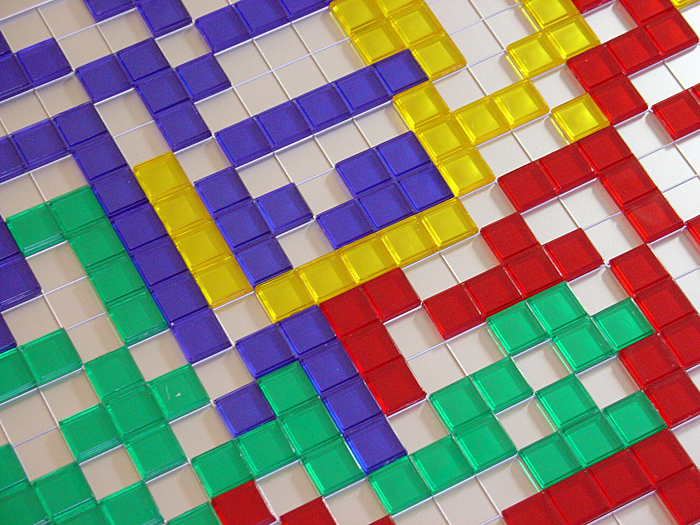
Colored polyomino tiles in Blokus

Each tile has a back (undifferentiated) side and a face side. Domino tiles are rectangular, twice as long as they are wide and at least twice as wide as they are thick. Other games exist with square tiles, triangular tiles and even hexagonal tiles. Modern games may use unconventional non-tileable shapes such as the curved-shaped Bendominoes, or use many different shapes that together tile a surface such as the polyominoes in Blokus.

== Traditional ==
- Anagrams
- Chinese dominoes
- Dominoes
- Khorol
- Mahjong – Traditional Chinese tile-based game played with a set of 144 tiles.

== Commercial ==
- Okey
- Quad-Ominos
- Qwirkle
- Rummikub
- Scrabble

== Using non-rectangular tiles ==
- Bendomino
- Blokus
- Gheos
- Heroscape
- Hive
- Tantrix
- Triominos

== Board games ==
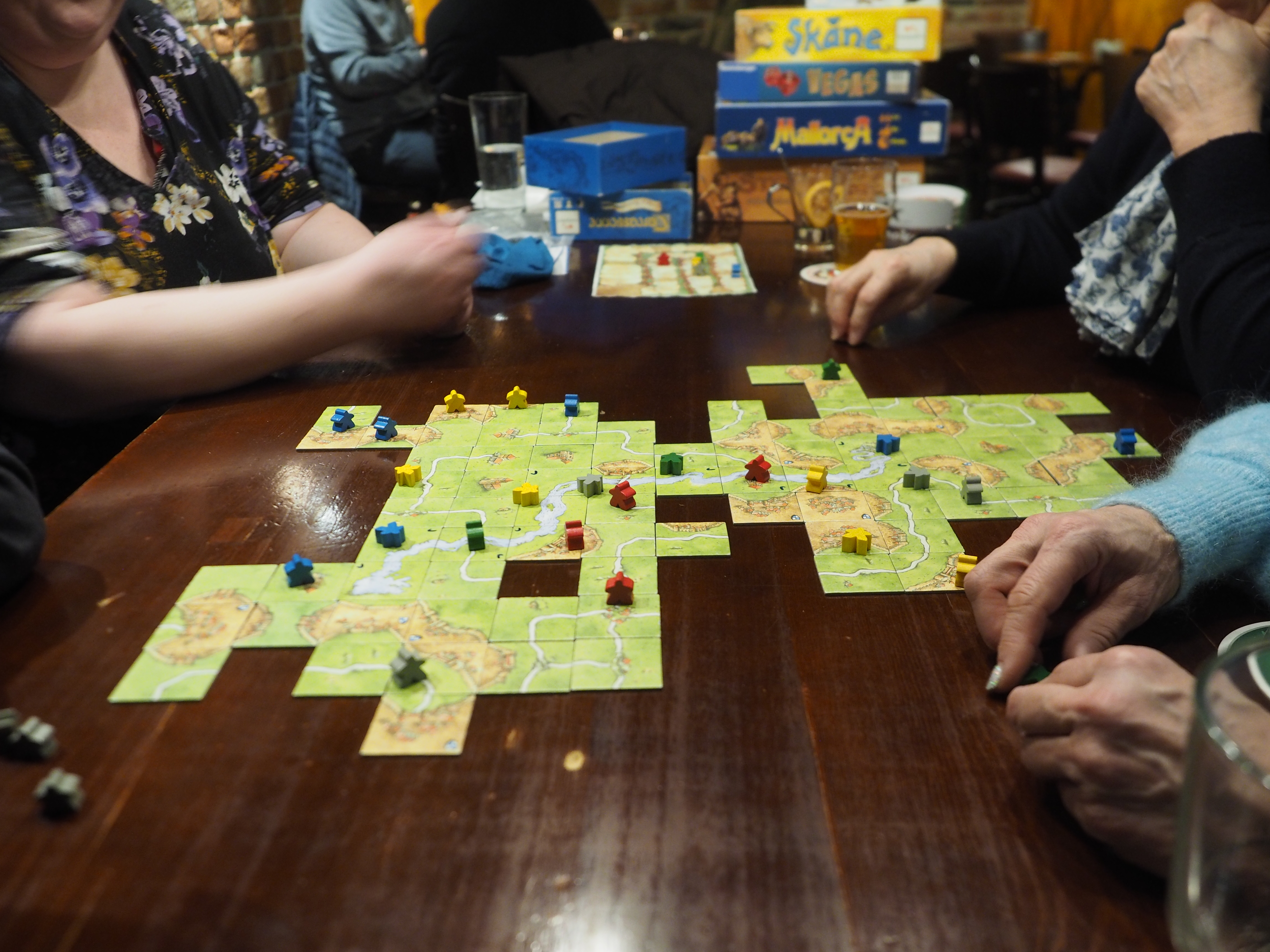
Carcassonne

- Alhambra
- Azul (board game)
- Betrayal at House on the Hill
- Carcassonne
- Domineering
- Fjords
- Forbidden Island
- Galaxy Trucker
- Gold Mine
- Rallyman: GT
- Saboteur
- The Settlers of Catan
- Tsuro
- Tsuro of the Seas
- Zombies!!!

== See also ==
- Sliding puzzle
