= Chinese dominoes =

Type of dominoes

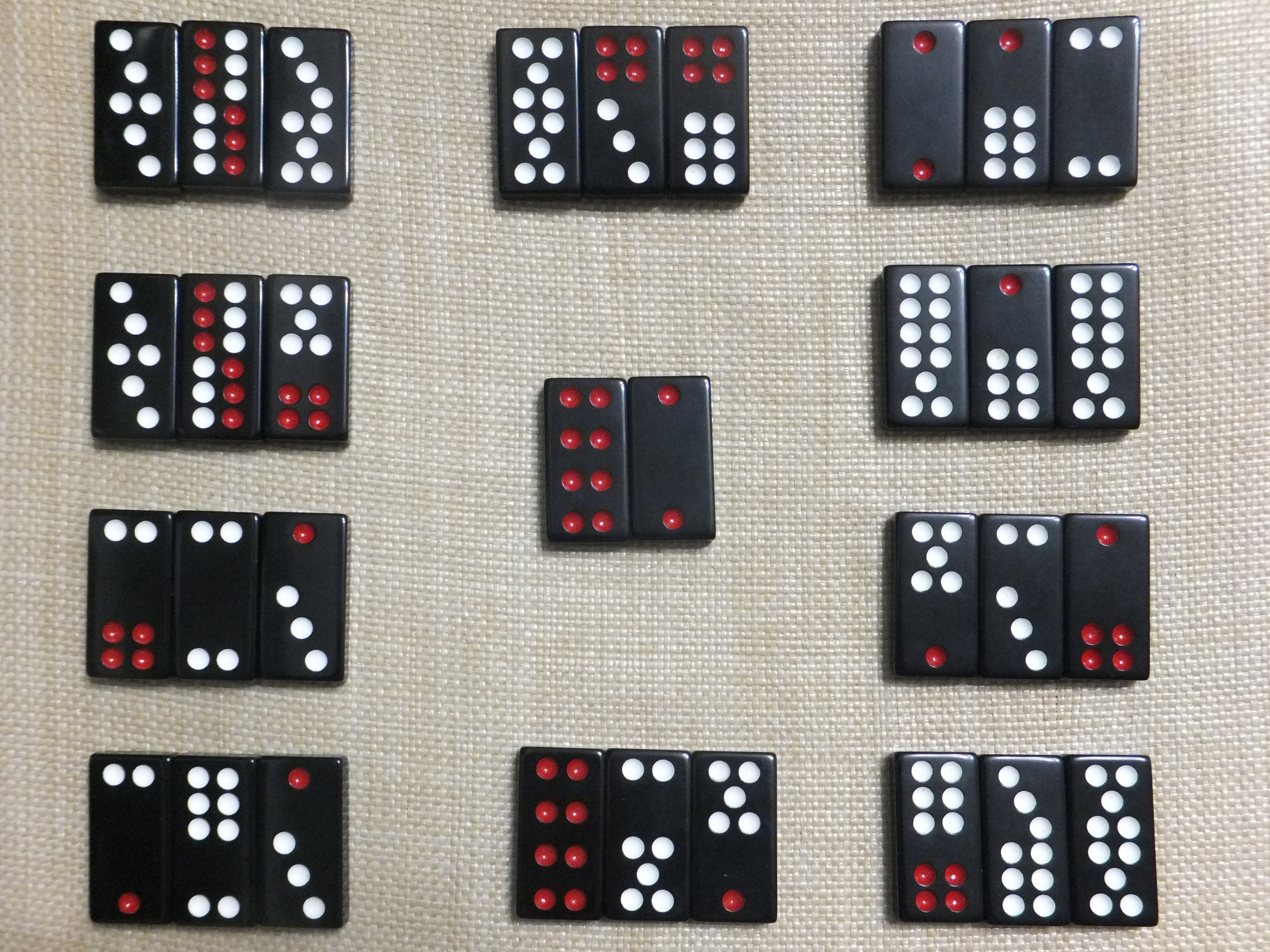
A full set of Chinese dominoes

Chinese dominoes are used in several tile-based games, namely, tien gow, pai gow, tiu u and kap tai shap. In Cantonese they are called gwāt pái (骨牌), which literally means "bone tiles"; it is also the name of a northern Chinese game, where the rules are quite different from the southern Chinese version of tien gow.

== History ==
Ming author Xie Zhaozhe (1567–1624) records the legend of dominoes having been presented to Song Emperor Huizong in 1112. However the contemporary Li Qingzhao (1084 – c. 1155) made no mention of dominoes in her compendium of games.

In China, early "domino" tiles were functionally identical to playing cards. An identifiable version of Chinese dominoes developed in the 12th or 13th century.

The oldest confirmed written mention of dominoes in China comes from the Former Events in Wulin (i.e. the capital Hangzhou) written by the Yuan Dynasty (1271–1368) author Zhou Mi (1232–1298), who listed "pupai" (gambling plaques or dominoes) as well as dice as items sold by peddlers during the reign of Song Emperor Xiaozong (r. 1162–1189). Andrew Lo asserts that Zhou Mi meant dominoes when referring to pupai, since the Ming author Lu Rong (1436–1494) explicitly defined pupai as dominoes (in regards to a story of a suitor who won a maiden's hand by drawing out four winning pupai from a set). Tiles dating from the 12th to 14th centuries have survived. Unlike most modern tiles they are white with black and red pips.

The earliest known manual written about dominoes is the Manual of the Xuanhe Period (《宣和牌譜》) written by Qu You (1341–1427), but some Chinese scholars believe this manual is a forgery from a later time. In the Encyclopedia of a Myriad of Treasures, Zhang Pu (1602–1641) described the game of laying out dominoes as pupai, although the character for pu had changed, yet retained a similar pronunciation.

During the Qing dynasty (1644-1912), the suits known as "Chinese" and "barbarian" were renamed to "civil" and "military" respectively to avoid offending the ruling Manchus. Tiles with blank ends, like those found in Western "double-six" dominoes, once existed during the 17th century. These games employed two sets of "double-six" tiles. It is possible that these were the types of dominoes that made it to Europe the following century. However, the 32-piece Chinese domino set, made to represent each possible face of two thrown dice and thus have no blank faces, differs from the 28-piece domino set found in the West during the mid 18th century. Chinese dominoes with blank faces were known during the 17th century. Each domino originally represented one of the 21 results of throwing two six-sided dice (2d6). One half of each domino is set with the pips from one die and the other half contains the pips from the second die. Chinese sets also introduce duplicates of some throws and divide the tiles into two suits: military and civil. Chinese dominoes are also longer than typical European ones.

Traditional Chinese domino games include Tien Gow, Pai Gow, Che Deng, and others.

== Deck composition and ranking ==
Dice combinations and domino equivalents
Civil suit (文子)			Military suit (武子)		
Rank	Roll / Domino	Name	Rank	Roll / Domino	Name
1 (high)	6-6	Heaven (天)	12	5-4	Nines (九)
2	1-1	Earth (地)	12	6-3	Nines (九)
3	4-4	Man (人)	13	5-3	Eights (八)
4	3-1	Harmony (和)	13	6-2	Eights (八)
5	5-5	Plum Flower (梅花)	14	4-3	Sevens (七)
6	3-3	Long Threes (長三)	14	5-2	Sevens (七)
7	2-2	Bench (板凳)	15	4-2	Six (六)
8	5-6	Tiger's Head (虎頭)	16	3-2	Fives (五)
9	4-6	Red Head Ten (紅頭十)	16	4-1	Fives (五)
10	1-6	Long Leg Seven (高腳七)	17 (low)	2-1	Final Three (三)
11	1-5	Red Mallet Six (玲瓏六)	17 (low)	2-1	Final Three (三)

Each tile pattern in the Chinese domino set is equivalent to a single outcome when two six-sided dice are thrown. Each combination is only used once, so there are 21 unique possible patterns. Eleven of these 21 unique patterns are repeated to make a total of 32 tiles in a Chinese dominoes set. The 32-tile set is divided into two "suits" or groups called "military" and "civil". There are no markings on the tiles to distinguish these suits; a player must simply remember which tiles belong to which group. There are two each of the eleven civil suit tiles (6-6, 1-1, 4-4, 1-3, 5-5, 3-3, 2-2, 5-6, 4-6, 1-6, 1-5) and one each of the ten military suit tiles (3-6, 4-5; 2-6, 3-5; 2-5, 3-4; 2-4; 1-4, 2-3; 1-2).

=== Civil suit ===
Each civil tile also has a Chinese name. Here are the Cantonese names and rough English translations:

- 6-6 is tin (天 heaven)
- 1-1 is dei (地 earth)
- 4-4 is yan (人 man)
- 1-3 is ngo (鵝 goose) or wo (和 harmony)
- 5-5 is mui (梅 plum flower)
- 3-3 is cheung saam (長三 long threes)
- 2-2 is baan dang (板凳 bench)
- 5-6 is fu (斧 hatchet) or fu tau (虎頭 tiger's head)
- 4-6 is ping (屏 partition) or hung tau sap (紅頭十 red head ten)
- 1-6 is gou goek tsat (高腳七 long leg seven)
- 1-5 is ling lung luk (玲瓏六 clever six) or hung tseoi luk (紅錘六 red mallet six)

The civil tiles are ranked according to the Chinese cultural significance of the tile names, and must be memorized. The hendiatris of heaven, earth, and man (天地人) dates back for over two thousand years while the harmony (和) of the three have been in dice and domino games since at least the Ming dynasty. Remembering the suits and rankings of the tiles is easier if one understands the Chinese names of the tiles and the symbolism behind them.

=== Military suit ===
The military tiles are named and ranked according to the total pips or points on the tiles. For example, the "nines" (3-6 and 4-5) rank higher than the "eights" (2-6 and 3-5). The rankings of the individual tiles are similar in most games. However, the ranking of combinations of tiles is slightly different in Pai Gow and Tien Gow.

Since there is only one of each military tile, these are usually grouped in four mixed "pairs" of equivalent total points: nines, eights, sevens, and fives; for example, the 3-6 and 4-5 tiles "match" because they have same total points (nine) and both are in the military suit. Among the military tiles, individual tiles of the same pair rank equally, such as 1-4 and 2-3, each totaling five.

"Supreme" pair
(至尊)

4-2

1-2

The 2-4 (six) and 1-2 (three) military tiles also are paired together in many games despite the nominal difference in total points. They are the only tiles in the entire set that have no corresponding tile in the military suit, considering sums. In Pai Gow both of these tiles may be scored as three or six, depending on which is more advantageous. This pair when played together is considered a suit on its own, called the gi jun (至尊 supreme). It is the highest ranking pair in the game of Pai Gow, though the tiles rank low individually (in their normal order). When either tile of this pair is played individually in the game of Tien Gow, each takes its regular ranking according to the total points among the other military suit tiles.

=== Physical characteristics ===
Stewart Culin stated that traditional dominoes are made of Chinese ebony with measurements of 2 5/8 in (67 mm) long, 7/8 in (22 mm) wide, and 3/8 in (9.5 mm) thick.

Values are marked with white and red pips. Using the same coloring scheme as traditional Chinese dice, every half-domino with 1 or 4 pips has those pips colored red; for example, the 4-5 domino has four red pips and five white pips. The only exception is the pair of 6-6 tiles. Half of the pips on the 6-6 domino are colored red to make them stand out as the top ranking tiles.

Typically, one of the short edges is marked with a single red pip, and the backs may be marked with three pips, arrayed diagonally white-red-white.

=== Variants ===
Chinese domino variants

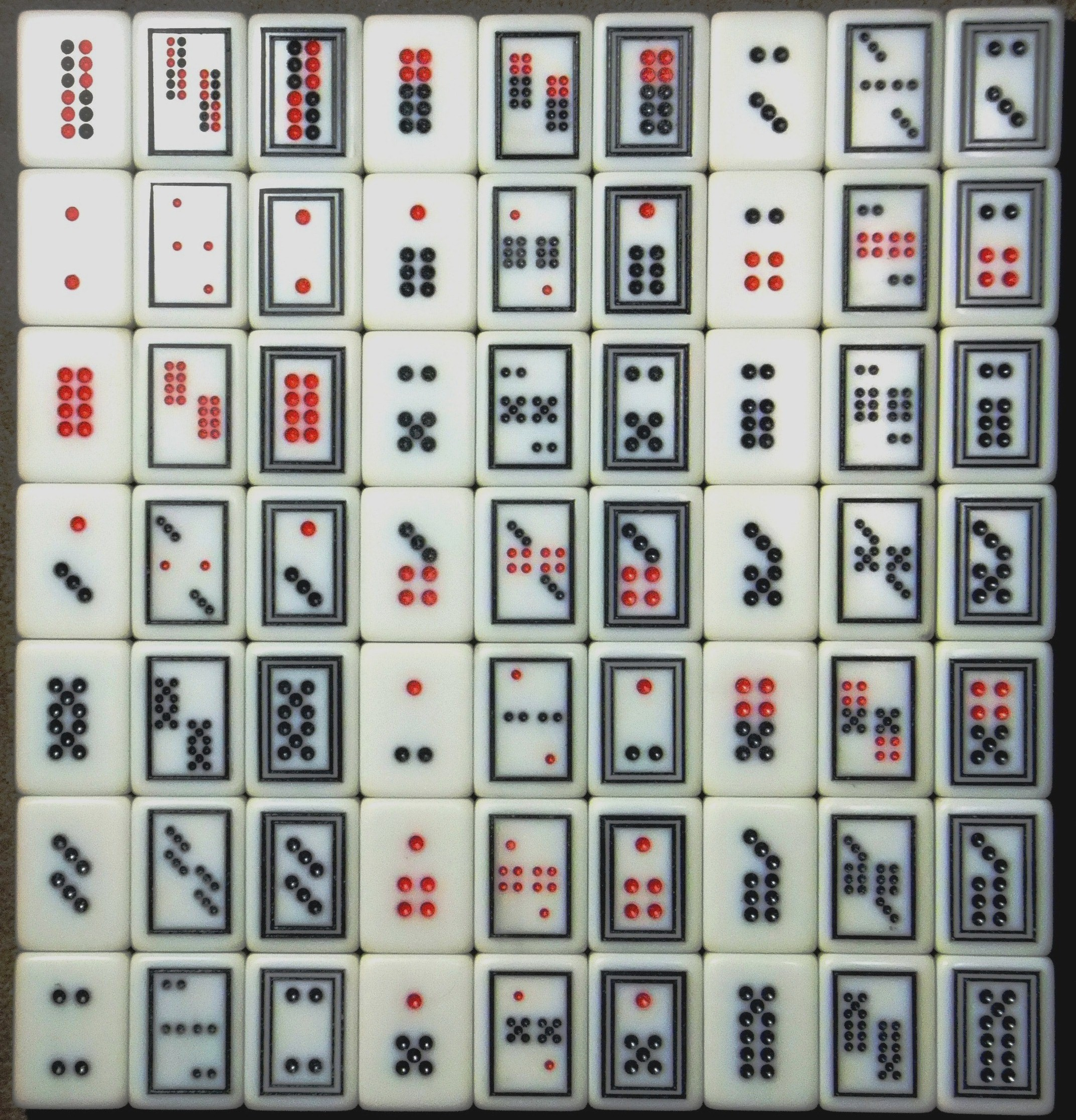
Half of a Digging Flowers set. The other half is identical.

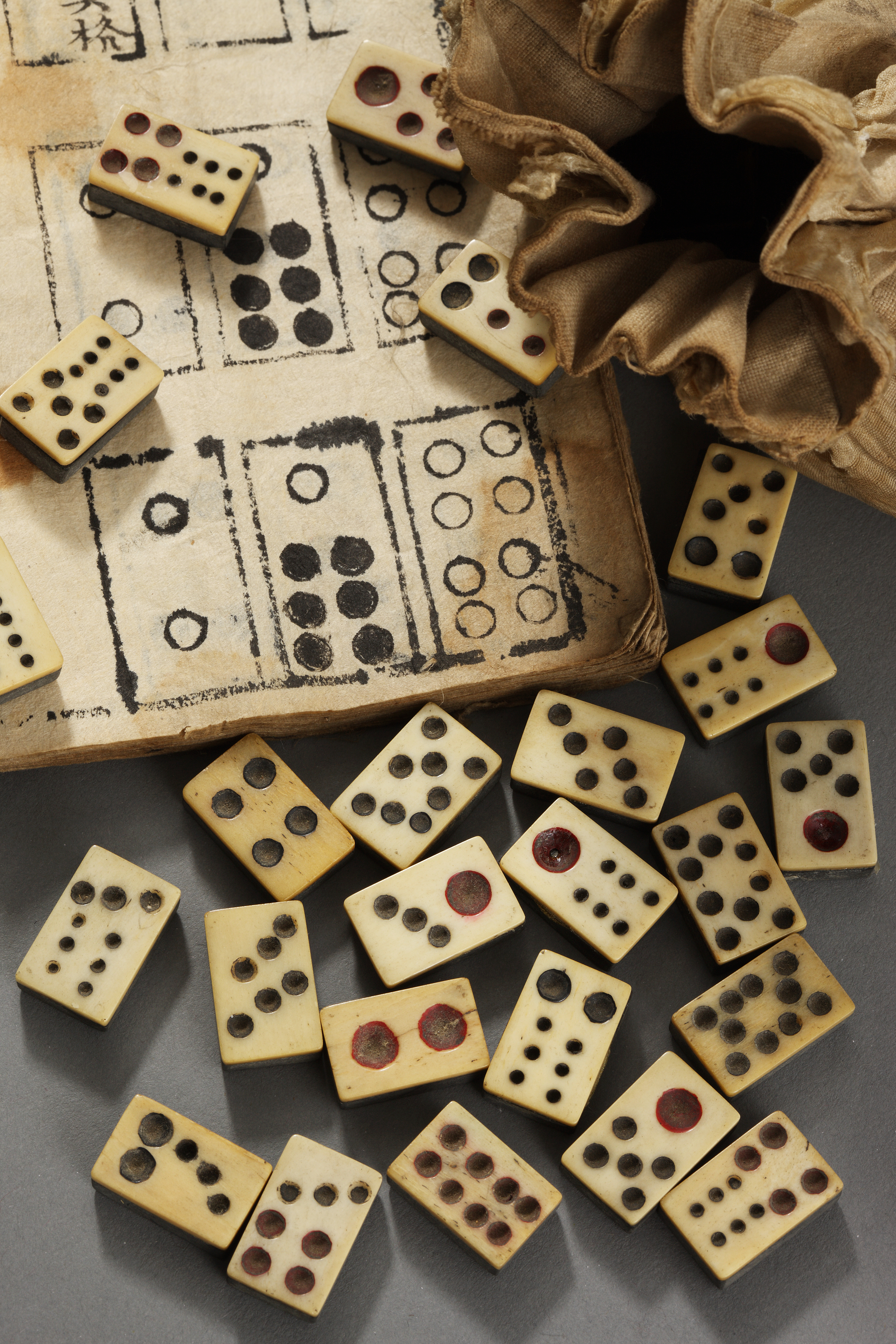
Dominoes from Korea

There are also sets with where the tiles have Xiangqi characters next to the pips. As Xiangqi also has 32 pieces, these dual use sets can be used to play Giog.

Variant sets include the Digging Flowers (挖花) game, which use the same 21 patterns generated by the 2d6 combination; some tiles have flowers or frames printed on them while others have their values duplicated. In addition, a Digging Flowers set may include several bonus tiles from mahjong, including flower, season, and blank tiles.

Dominoes from Korea also come in a set of 32 and bear markings schematically identical to Chinese dominoes, based on the throw of two dice, although the tiles are closer in size and shape to those used in mahjong, measuring 3/4 in × 7/16 in × 3/16 in (19.1 mm × 11.1 mm × 4.8 mm), and the pip size may vary, especially for the 1- and 4-pip halves. The pairings for the "military" suit also differ: 1-2 and 4-5; 1-4 and 2-3, 2-4 and 3-4, 2-5 and 3-5, and 2-6 and 3-6.

Dice throws / tile names (Korean)
Value (Qty)	Image	Name	Value (Qty)	Image	Name	Value (Qty)	Image	Name	Value (Qty)	Image	Name
1-1 (2)		smallest syo-syo (소소, 퉁소)	2-2 (2)		superior two tjoun-a (진아)	3-3 (2)		long three tjyang-sam (장삼)	4-4 (2)		superior red tjoun-hong (직흥)
1-2 (1)		rat nose tjoui-hko (쥐코)	2-3 (1)		two, three a-sam (아삼)	3-4 (1)		three, four sam-sa (삼사)	4-5 (1)		four, five sa-o (사오)
1-3 (2)		small, three syo-sam (소삼)	2-4 (1)		two, four a-sa (어사)	3-5 (1)		three, five sam-o (삼오)	4-6 (2)		four, six sa-ryouk (사륙)
1-4 (1)		white, four paik-sa (백사)	2-5 (1)		sovereign two koan-i (관이)	3-6 (1)		three, six sam-ryouk (삼륙)	5-5 (2)		superior five tjoun-o (준오)
1-5 (2)		white, five paik-o (백오)	2-6 (1)		two, six a-ryouk (아륙)				5-6 (2)		five, six o-ryouk (오륙)
1-6 (2)		white, six paik-ryouk (백륙)							6-6 (2)		superior six tjoun-ryouk (주륙)

Chinese Dominoes may also appear in a card format (zh:纸骨牌). 15 Lake Cards (Chinese: 十五湖牌) have the 21 patterns (from the 2d6 combinations) quadruplicated to form an 84-card deck. Si Chuan Cards (Chinese: 四川長牌) may have the 21 patterns plus two additional cards (the "listen - use" and the "god of wealth") duplicated up to 5 times to form a 115-card deck.

== Bone tiles game ==
The eponymous game of Bone Tiles (gǔpái in Mandarin) is played in northern and central China and as far south as Hunan. The name suggests that it is or became the default game played with dominoes in those regions. It is a trick-taking game similar to Tien Gow but has been simplified. In single-tile tricks, the civil and military suits have been merged into a single suit. In double-tile tricks, there is a new ranking order similar to Pai Gow. Triple-tile and quadruple-tile tricks are not allowed as in older versions of Tien Gow. Scoring has been simplified to number of stacks won.
