= William Henry Wilkinson =

British sinologist (1858–1930)

Sir William Henry Wilkinson (traditional Chinese: 務謹順, simplified Chinese: 务谨顺; May 10, 1858 – 1930) was a British sinologist who served as Consul-General for the United Kingdom in China and Korea. He was also a playing card collector and card game enthusiast.

== British Diplomatic Service ==
?–1893	Consul at Shantou
1893–94	Acting Consul-General at Seoul
1894–97	Acting Vice-Consul at Chemulpo
1900–01	Consul at Ningbo
1901–02	Acting Consul at Wenzhou
1902–09	Consul-General at Kunming and Simao, for Yunnan and Guizhou
1909–11	Consul-General at Chengdu
1911–12	Consul-General at Mukden
1912–17	Consul-General at Hankou

== Books ==
- Where Chineses Drive: English Student-Life at Peking (London, 1885)
- "Those Foreign Devils!": A Celestial on England and Englishmen by Hsiang-fu Yuan (translated by Wilkinson; London and New York, 1891)
- The Game of Khanhoo (London, 1891)
- A Manual of Chinese Chess (Shanghai, 1893)
- Chinese Origin of Playing Cards (1895)
- The Corean government: constitutional changes, July 1894 to October 1895. With an appendix on subsequent enactments to 30th June 1896 (1896)
- Bridge Maxims (1918)
- Mah-Jongg: a memorandum (1925)

== His Collection of Playing Cards ==
Cards from Wilkinson's collection are now in the British Museum, and are referred to in [https://archive.org/details/aen4312.0001.001.umich.edu Catalogue of the collection of playing cards bequeathed to the Trustees of the British museum by the late Lady [[Charlotte Schreiber]] by British Museum]] by Freeman M. O'Donoghue (1901), pp. 184–185: "Chinese – Collection of modern packs acquired by the testator from Mr. W.H. Wilkinson of H.M. Consular Service, who has kindly furnished the following information: The packs contained in this collection were procured during the year 1889–90 from Guangzhou, Shantou, and Fuzhou in South China, from Ningbo and Shanghai on the central sea-board, from Beijing in the north, from Jiujiang and Yichang in mid- China, and from Chongqing in the far west...."
