= Bendomino =

Board game

The Bendomino box and pieces

Bendomino is a tabletop strategy game similar to dominoes, created by Thierry Denoual and published by Blue Orange Games in 2007. It is a set of double-6 dominoes with a 120-degree curve. The main difference from dominoes is the curved shape of the pieces, which introduces a new level of strategy to the game. There is also a version of the game for younger players with pictures instead of numbers and symbols on the Bendomino tiles.

== Gameplay ==
Bendomino is played in rounds. At the beginning of each round, the 28 Bendominoes are placed face down and mixed. Players draw their hand, the remaining pieces represent the stock. (With 2 players each player takes 7 Bendominoes, with 3 players: each player takes 6 Bendominoes, with 4 players: each player takes 5 Bendominoes.)

The player with the highest Bendomino double starts the game by placing the piece on the center of the table. If no double was drawn, the highest Bendomino number should be played. (Example: 6/5)

Taking turns in a clockwise direction, each player tries to match a Bendomino by number to either end of the Bendomino chain. To be accepted the new piece needs to match but also has to fit. Each Bendomino must be connected evenly with other pieces to ensure accuracy of the game.

If players do not have a Bendomino that can be played, they must draw one piece from the stock. If the piece they draw can be played, they can immediately play it. Players can decide to draw a Bendomino and pass their turn even if they have playable pieces.

Either end of the Bendomino game can be blocked when: no matching numbers are available, no matching pieces can fit, one end of the game is trapped in a dead end, both ends connect (very rare). If both ends of the Bendomino chain are blocked, each player draws a Bendomino until the stock is empty.

A round ends when: A player has no Bendominoes left to play or the stock is empty and players cannot play any pieces. A player wins a round when: They play all their pieces or no pieces can be played by any player and you have the lowest point total. (The point total is the total number of dots on your remaining Bendominoes). The winner of a round scores the dot points from all opponents' remaining Bendominoes.

The first player to score 100 points wins the game.

=== Variations ===
Several variations exist. In Wild Draw: For a more aggressive game, when players do not have a playable piece they must continue to draw until they get a playable piece or until the stock is empty. In No Draw: When players do not have a matching piece, they pass their turn instead of drawing. No Draw with 2 Teams of 2 players: each player draws 7 pieces at the start of the game, so there is no stock. Players take turns and only use their individual pieces. A team wins a round when one team member is declared the winner (see basic rules). The winning team scores the dot points from the remaining Bendominoes of the losing team.

Bendomino patent application for their curved shape

== See also ==
- Glossary of domino terms
