= Tien Gow =

Chinese gambling games

Tien Gow or Tin Kau (Chinese: 天九; pinyin: tiān jiǔ; Jyutping: tin1 gau2; lit. 'Heaven and Nine') is the name of Chinese gambling games played with either a pair of dice or a set of 32 Chinese dominoes. In these games, Heaven is the top rank of the civil suit, while Nine is the top rank of the military suit. The civil suit was originally called the Chinese (華) suit while the military suit was called the barbarian (夷) suit (see Wen and wu and Hua–Yi distinction) but this was changed during the Qing dynasty to avoid offending the ruling Manchus. The highly idiosyncratic and culture-specific suit-system of these games is likely the conceptual origin of suits, an idea that later is used for playing cards. Play is counter-clockwise.

== Dice game ==
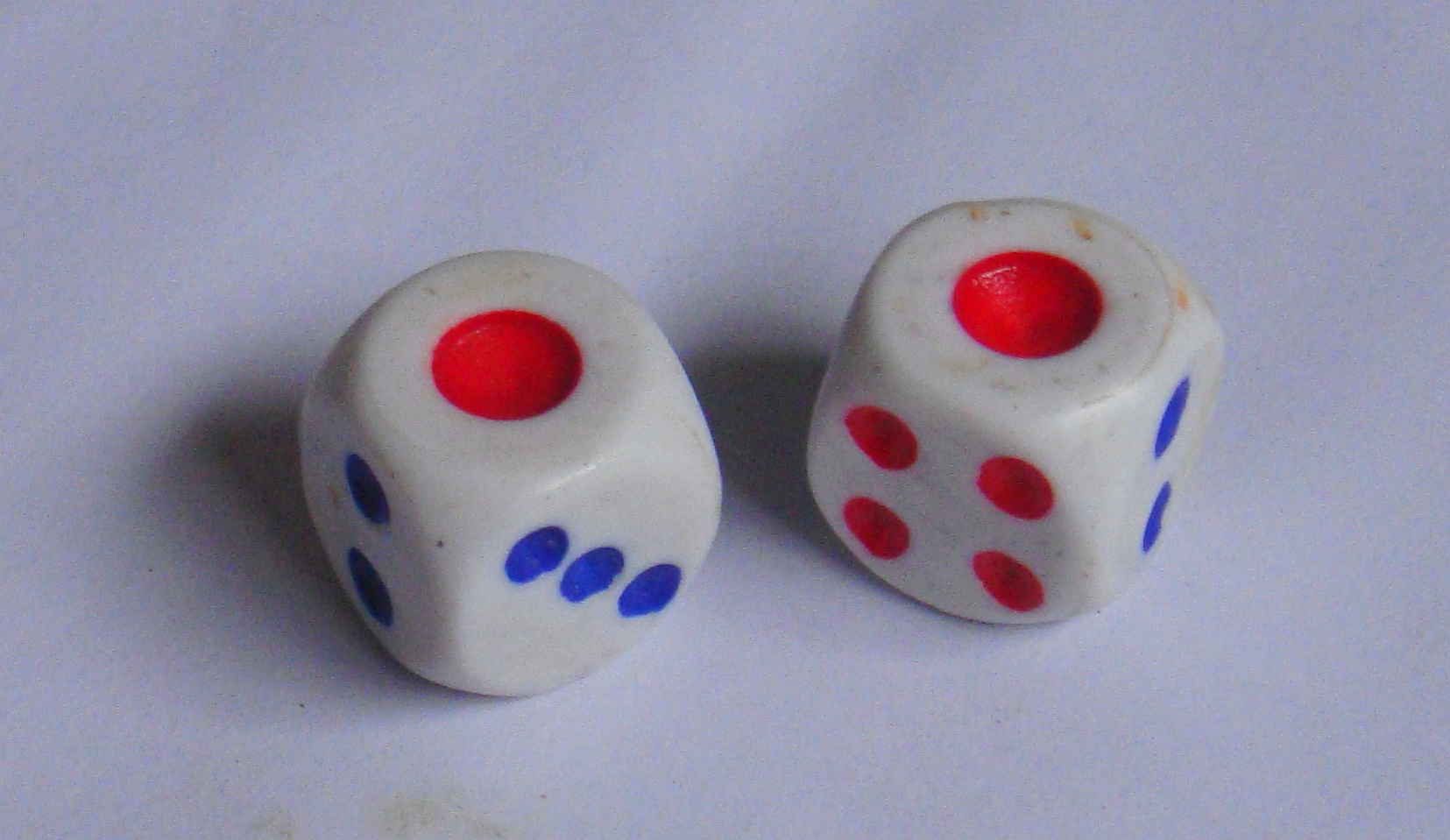
Chinese dice, "Earth" combination shown

Throwing Heaven and Nine (掷天九), or Kwat-P'ai (骨牌) (Note: This is a transliteration of the Cantonese pronunciation for Chinese dominoes.) as reported by Ng Kwai-shang in 1886, is a game of chance where players try to beat each other with a higher combination from a pair of Chinese dice with red 1 and 4 pips. Of the 21 possible combinations, 11 are ranked in a "civil" suit and 10 are ranked in a "military" suit.

Dice combinations
Civil suit (文子)				Military suit (武子)			
Order	Illustration	Roll	Name	Order	Illustration	Roll	Name
1		6-6	Heaven (天)	12		5-4	Nines (九)
2		1-1	Earth (地)	12		6-3	Nines (九)
3		4-4	Man (人)	13		5-3	Eights (八)
4		3-1	Harmony (和) (or Goose, 鵝)	13		6-2	Eights (八)
5		5-5	Plum Flower (梅花)	14		4-3	Sevens (七)
6		3-3	Long Threes (長三)	14		5-2	Sevens (七)
7		2-2	Bench (板凳)	15		4-2	Six (六)
8		5-6	Tiger's Head (斧頭)	16		3-2	Fives (五)
9		4-6	Red Head Ten (紅頭十)	16		4-1	Fives (五)
10		1-6	Long Leg Seven (高腳七)	17		2-1	Final Three (三丁)
11		1-5	Red Mallet Six (玲瓏六)	17		2-1	Final Three (三丁)

The ranks from highest to lowest are:

- Civil: Heaven (6-6); Earth (1-1); Mankind (4-4); Harmony (1-3); Plum Flower (5-5); Long Threes (3-3); Bench (2-2); Tiger's Head (5-6); Red Head Ten (4-6); Long Leg Seven (1-6); Red Mallet Six (1-5)
- Military: Nines (3-6 or 4-5); Eights (3-5 or 2-6); Sevens (2-5 or 3-4); Six (2-4); Fives (2-3 or 1-4); Final Three (1-2)

After the wager is set, the banker throws the dice into a bowl which sets the suit. The banker automatically wins if they throw the highest rank within the suit (Heaven or Nine) but loses if they throw the lowest rank (Red Mallet Six or Final Three).

For any other combination, the other players each throw the dice and try to beat the banker's throw within the same suit. If they throw the wrong suit, then they get to throw again until they "follow suit". Those that throw lower than the banker will have to pay them. According to R.C. Bell, (Note: No other source states it but Ng implies it.) if there is a tie, no money is exchanged.

The opponents keep throwing until one manages to beat the banker and gets paid. The player to the right of the banker becomes the next banker and starts the following round after new stakes are set.

== Domino games ==
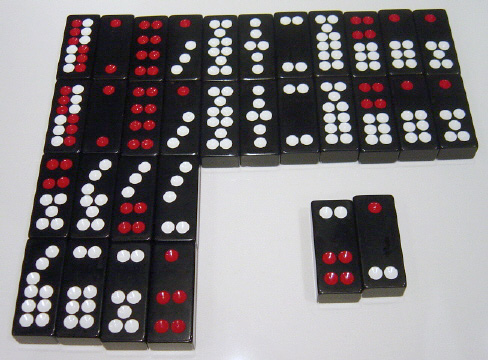
A set of Chinese dominoes

In the domino games, there are two copies of each Civil tile. They have been available in playing card format since the beginning of the 17th century.

=== Turning Heaven and Nine ===
Turning Heaven and Nine (扭天九) is a simple two player trick-taking game of chance. The 32 dominoes are mixed then stacked, face-down, in eight piles of four tiles each. The first player takes a domino from the top of a pile and turns it over while the second player takes the one below it and reveals it for comparison.

If the second player draws a higher-ordered tile of the same suit, they take both tiles and lead the next trick. Otherwise, the first player takes both tiles; this mechanic is analogous to the card game War but with an added requirement to follow suit. The game continues in this manner until all tiles have been turned over. Each player counts the total red pips in their captured tiles with the loser having to pay the difference to the winner.

=== Playing Heaven and Nine ===
Playing Heaven and Nine (打天九) is a multi-trick game for 4 players. All tiles are distributed by the banker so each player gets eight. The banker leads the first trick with a single, double, triple, or quadruple trick and the others must play out with an equal number of tiles. Players that are unable to beat the trick discard their tiles face down (this is characteristic of some trumpless trick-taking games like Madiao and Ganjifa). The winner leads the next trick. The player who takes the last trick or multi-trick becomes the next banker. Players who have not won any of the first seven tricks automatically lose the last trick regardless of the strength of their final tile.

Two trick sets
Rank Suit	"Big Four" (四大)				"Four Elements" (四素)				"Miscellaneous Three" (三雜)		
Civil											
Civil	Heaven (天)	Earth (地)	People (人)	Harmony (和)	Plum Flower (梅花)	Long Threes (長三)	Bench (板凳)	Tiger's Head (虎頭)	Red Head Ten (紅頭十)	Long Leg Seven (高腳七)	Red Mallet Six (玲瓏六)
Civil	(6+6)×2	(1+1)×2	(4+4)×2	(3+1)×2	(5+5)×2	(3+3)×2	(2+2)×2	(5+6)×2	(4+6)×2	(1+6)×2	(1+5)×2
Military											
Military	Nines (九)		Eights (八)		Sevens (七)		Fives (五)				
Military	3+6, 4+5		3+5, 2+6		3+4, 2+5		3+2, 1+4				
Mixed											
Mixed	Heaven Nine (天九)		Earth Eight (地八)		People Seven (人七)		Harmony Five (和五)				
Mixed	6+6, 4+5	6+6, 3+6	1+1, 3+5	1+1, 2+6	4+4, 3+4	4+4, 2+5	1+3, 1+4	1+3, 2+3			
Supreme											
Supreme	Supreme Treasure (至尊寶)										
Supreme	2+4, 1+2										

In double tricks, there are two additional suits, mixed and supreme:

- Mixed: Heaven and a Nine; Earth and an Eight; People and a Seven; Harmony and a Five
- Supreme: Six and Final Three

As the supreme suit consists of a single pair, it is unbeatable if led but considered a discard if not led.

Three and four trick sets
Rank Suit	Highest		Second		Third		Lowest	
3 Mixed, civil (三文牌)								
3 Mixed, civil (三文牌)	Triple civil, heaven nine (三文天九)		Triple civil, earth eight (三文地八)		Triple civil, people seven (三文人七)		Triple civil, harmony five (三文和五)	
3 Mixed, civil (三文牌)	(6+6)×2, 4+5	(6+6)×2, 3+6	(1+1)×2, 3+5	(1+1)×2, 2+6	(4+4)×2, 3+4	(4+4)×2, 2+5	(1+3)×2, 1+4	(1+3)×2, 2+3
3 Mixed, military (三武牌)								
3 Mixed, military (三武牌)	Triple military, heaven nine (三武天九)		Triple military, earth eight (三武地八)		Triple military, people seven (三武人七)		Triple military, harmony five (三武和五)	
3 Mixed, military (三武牌)	6+6, 4+5, 3+6		1+1, 3+5, 2+6		4+4, 3+4, 2+5		1+3, 1+4, 2+3	
4 Mixed (四文武牌)								
4 Mixed (四文武牌)	Quadruple heaven nine (四天九)		Quadruple earth eight (四地八)		Quadruple people seven (四人七)		Quadruple harmony five (四和五)	
4 Mixed (四文武牌)	(6+6)×2, 4+5, 3+6		(1+1)×2, 3+5, 2+6		(4+4)×2, 3+4, 2+5		(1+3)×2, 1+4, 2+3	

In triple and quadruple tricks these are the only valid combinations: Heavens and Nines; Earths and Eights; Mankinds and Sevens; Harmonies and Fives

Triple tricks have a rule that a triplet consisting of two civil and one military tiles can only be beaten by a triplet consisting of the same suit compositions. Likewise, a triplet consisting of two military and one civil tiles can only be beaten by the same.

There are complex rules to the game play and scoring. There is an accumulating multiplier to the winning and loss as the game proceeds. There are bonuses for winning the last trick with certain methods and for different types of slams. It can be adapted to be played with a standard 52-card deck.

The earliest surviving rules were written by Pan Zhiheng around 1610. In this version (鬥天九), triple and quadruple tricks were not allowed and Heavens can beat Nines and the Supreme pair. There were also versions for two or three players in which some of the tiles remain undistributed. His rules are more similar to the ones used in northern China during the early 20th century than the Cantonese rules that are dominant in the present. They are also very similar to another game simply called dominoes (骨牌) played in many parts of China.

Bagchen is a Tibetan variation played with a double set of dominoes. Daaluu (Даалуу) is a variation in Mongolia that also uses a double set and plays similarly to Khorol.

== History ==
In his article Chinese Origin of Playing Cards published in 1895, Sir William Henry Wilkinson pointed out that the game of Tien Gow was invented long before Song dynasty, but was standardized in 1120:

[Quote from page 66. Note this publication predated the modern pinyin transliteration system]
It is perfectly clear, indeed, that all that was done or asked for in 1120 was an imperial decision as to which of several forms or interpretations of the game now known as T'ien-kiu ("Heavens and Nines") was to be considered orthodox. The game and the cards must have been in existence long before. The passage from the Cheng-tzâ-t'ung [《正字通》] runs thus (s.v. p'ai [牌]):

Also ya p'ai now the instruments of the game. A common legend states that in the second year of the Hsüan-ho [宣和二年], in the Sung dynasty [i.q. 1120 AD], a certain official memorialized the throne, praying that the ya p'ai (ivory cards [牙牌]) be fixed as a pack of 32, comprising 127 pips [sic, it should be 227, but Chinese printers are careless], in order to accord with the expanse of the stars and constellations. The combination 'heaven' [6/6, 6/6] consisted of two pieces, containing 24 pips, figures of the 24 solar periods; 'earth' [1/1, 1/1] also composed two pieces, but contained 4 pips, the 4 points of the compass - east, west, south, and north; 'man' [4/4, 4/4] two pieces, containing 16 pips, the virtues of humanity, benevolence, propriety, and wisdom, four-fold; 'harmony' [2/3, 1/3] two pieces of 8 pips, figuring the breath of harmony, which pervades the eight divisions of the year. The other combinations had each their names. There were four players having eight cards apiece for their hand, and the cards won or lost according as the number of the pips was less or in more the winner being rewarded with counters. In-the time of Kao-tsung [高宗 1127-1163] pattern packs were issued by imperial edict. They were known throughout the empire as Ku p'ai, 'bone p'ai;' [骨牌] but it does not follow that this class of games, po-sai [博塞], Ko-wu [格五], and the rest originated in the reign of Hsüan-ho.

Ming author Xie Zhaozhe (1567–1624) also records the legend of dominoes having been presented to Emperor Huizong but in the year 1112. The Ming sources may be early by half a century as Li Qingzhao (1084 – c. 1155) made no mention of dominoes in her compendium of games. The oldest confirmed written mention of dominoes in China comes from the Former Events in Wulin (i.e. the capital Hangzhou) as recorded by Zhou Mi (1232–1298), who listed dominoes as items sold by peddlers during the reign of Emperor Xiaozong (r. 1162–1189).

== Relation to Pai Gow ==
The partition game of Pai Gow borrows most of its tile ranking from the pairings in Playing Heaven and Nine. However, the suits have been merged into a single sequence:

- Supreme, Civil, Military, Nines and Heaven, Nines and Earth, Eights and Heaven, Mankind and Heaven, Eights and Earth, Mankind and Earth

Below these are unlisted pairs that use modular arithmetic like in Tau Gnau or baccarat.
