= Pai gow =

Chinese gambling game using tiles

- Chinese: 牌九
- Literal meaning: card nine
Transcriptions
Standard Mandarin
- Hanyu Pinyin: pái jiǔ
Yue: Cantonese
- Jyutping: paai^{4} gau^{2}
- IPA: [pʰaj˩.kɐw˧˥]

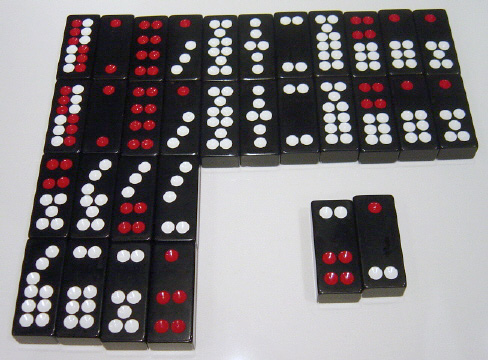
A set of 32 Chinese dominoes. The top two rows of tiles show the eleven matching pairs, in descending value from left to right. Below them are five non-matching pairs, worth less than the matching pairs, and also in descending value from left to right. The Gee Joon ("Supreme") tiles, lower right, are not matching but rank as the highest pair overall.

Pai gow (/paɪ ˈɡaʊ/ py GOW; Chinese: 牌九; pinyin: páijiǔ; Jyutping: paai^{4} gau^{2} [pʰaj˩.kɐw˧˥]) is a Chinese gambling game, played with a set of 32 Chinese dominoes. It is played in major casinos in China (including Macau); the United States (including Boston, Massachusetts; Las Vegas, Nevada; Reno, Nevada; Connecticut; Atlantic City, New Jersey; Pennsylvania; Mississippi; and cardrooms in California); Canada (including Edmonton, Alberta and Calgary, Alberta); Australia; and New Zealand. Illegal gambling clubs offering Pai gow can also be found in many Chinatown worldwide.

The name pai gow is sometimes used to refer to a card game called pai gow poker (or "double-hand poker"), which is loosely based on pai gow. The act of playing pai gow is also colloquially known as "eating dog meat".

== History ==
Although some claim that Pai Gow is the first documented form of dominoes, originating in China before or during the Song dynasty, which can only apply to gu pai 骨牌, that is, Chinese dominoes, the game of pai gow (Mandarin paijiu) is not recorded until the late 19th century. Its earliest description is found in a collection of Cantonese games published in Hong Kong in 1886.

The name literally means "card nine", after the normal maximum hand. It is assumed that the original game was modeled after both a Chinese creation myth, and military organization in China at that time (ranks one through nine), but no document supports this theory.

== Rules ==
=== Starting ===
Tiles are shuffled on the table and arranged into eight face-down stacks of four tiles each in an assembly known as the woodpile. Individual stacks or tiles may then be moved in specific ways to rearrange the woodpile, after which the players place their bets.

Next, each player (including the dealer) is given one stack of tiles and must use them to form two hands of two tiles each. The hand with the lower value is called the front hand, and the hand with the higher value is called the rear hand. If a player's front hand beats the dealer's front hand, and the player's rear hand beats the dealer's rear hand, then that player wins the bet and is paid off at 1:1 odds (even money). If a player's front and rear hands both lose to the dealer's respective hands, the player loses the bet. If one hand wins and the other loses, the player is said to push, and gets back only the money they bet. Generally seven players will play, and each player's hands are compared only against the dealer's hands; comparisons are always front-front and rear-rear, never one of each.

There are 35,960 possible ways to select 4 of the 32 tiles when the 32 tiles are considered distinguishable. However, there are 3,620 distinct sets of 4 tiles when the tiles of a pair are considered indistinguishable. There are 496 ways to select 2 of the 32 tiles when the 32 tiles are considered distinguishable. There are 136 distinct hands (pairs of tiles) when the tiles of a pair are considered indistinguishable.

=== Scoring ===
Each player groups their four tiles into two hands of two tiles each. The two hands are referred to as the "high" and "low" hands, based on their score.

The highest-ranked hands are formed from the sixteen named pairs. Otherwise, the next highest-ranked hand results from creating a Gong or Wong, which are specific combinations with the Day and Teen tiles. If the four tiles drawn for the two hands do not permit the formation of a named pair, Gong, or Wong, then the total number of pips on both tiles in a hand are added using modular arithmetic (modulo 10), equivalent to how a hand in baccarat is scored.

The name "pai gow" is loosely translated as "make nine" or "card nine". This reflects the fact that, with the exception of named pairs, Gong, or Wong, the maximum score for a hand of mixed tiles is nine.

==== Named pairs ====
Pai Gow named pairs (Bo)
Rank	Example	Pips	Name
1 (highest)		4+2, 1+2	Supreme; Gee Joon (至尊)
2		(6+6)×2	Heaven; Teen (天)
3		(1+1)×2	Earth; Day (地)
4		(4+4)×2	People; Yun (人)
5		(3+1)×2	Goose; Gor (鵝)
6		(5+5)×2	Plum; Mooy (梅)
7		(3+3)×2	Long; Chong (長)
8		(2+2)×2	Board; Bon (板)
9		(5+6)×2	Ax; Foo (斧)
10		(4+6)×2	Partition; Ping (屏)
11		(1+6)×2	Seven; Tit (七)
12		(1+5)×2	Six; Look (六)
13		3+6, 4+5	Nines; Chop Gow (紮九)
14		3+5, 2+6	Eights; Chop Bot (紮八)
15		3+4, 2+5	Sevens; Chop Chit (紮七)
16 (lowest)		3+2, 1+4	Fives; Chop Ng (紮五)

The 32 tiles in a Chinese dominoes set can be arranged into 16 named pairs. Eleven of these pairs have identical tiles, and five of these pairs are made up of two tiles that have the same total number of pips, but in different groupings. The latter group includes the Gee Joon tiles, which can score the same, whether as three or six.

Any hand consisting of a pair outscores a non-pair, regardless of the pip counts. Named pairs are often thought of as being worth 12 points each, but there is a hierarchy within the named pairs.

The pairs are considered to tell the story of creation:

1. Gee Joon (至尊) is the highest ranked pair, and is the Supreme Creator of the universe
2. Teen (天) is the heavens, the first thing Gee Joon created.
3. Day (地) is the earth itself, placed under the heavens.
4. Yun (人) is man, whom Gee Joon made to live upon the earth.
5. Gor (鵝) is geese, made for man to eat.
6. Mooy (梅) is plum flowers, to give the earth beauty.

Each subsequent pair is another step in the story...robes (Bon) for man to wear, a hatchet (Foo) to chop wood, partitions (Ping) for a house, man's seventh (Tit) and eighth (Look) children.

The matching pair of eights (Yun, left) is worth more than the non-matching pair of eights (Chop Bot, right).

Only the sixteen named pairs are valid. For example, if a hand contained a Yun (4-4) and a Chop Bot (3-5 or 2-6), these would not form a pair at all, despite both tiles having eight pips each. A Yun (4-4) exclusively pairs with the other Yun, and likewise only the two Chop Bot tiles can be paired together. Likewise, tiles with six pips (Look, 1-5, pairs with another Look, not the Gee Joon 2-4) and seven pips (Tit, 1-6, pairs with another Tit, not the two Chop Chit tiles 2-5 and 3-4, which pair with each other) are subject to the same pairing restrictions.

When the player and dealer both have a pair, the higher-ranked pair wins. Ranking pairs is determined not by the sum of the tiles' pips, but rather by aesthetics; the order must be memorized. The highest pairs are the Gee Joon tiles, the Teens, the Days, and the red eights. The lowest pairs are the mismatched nines, eights, sevens, and fives.

==== Wongs and Gongs ====
Wong and Gong combinations
	Wong (11)		Gong (10)		
Teen (6-6)					
Teen (6-6)	6-6, 5-4	6-6, 6-3	6-6, 4-4	6-6, 5-3	6-6, 6-2
Teen (6-6)	Teen, Gow		Teen, Yun	Teen, Bot	
Day (1-1)					
Day (1-1)	1-1, 5-4	1-1, 6-3	1-1, 4-4	1-1, 5-3	1-1, 6-2
Day (1-1)	Day, Gow		Day, Yun	Day, Bot	

The double-one tiles and double-six tiles are known as the Day and Teen tiles, respectively. The combination of a Day or Teen with a nine (Gow, 5-4 or 6-3) creates a Wong, worth 11 points, while putting either of them with an eight (either Yun, 4-4; or Bot, 5-3 or 6-2) results in a Gong, worth 10. Gongs and Wongs formed with a Teen tile are ranked higher than those formed with a Day tile.

However, if a Day or Teen is grouped in a single hand with any other tile, the standard scoring rules apply. The combination of a Day or Teen with a seven (Tit, 1-6; or Chit, 2-5 or 3-4) is sometimes referred to as a high nine, as the score is the maximum (nine) when added together, and the group contains a high-rank tile for potential tiebreaking purposes.

==== Modular arithmetic ====
Basic scoring examples (modulo 10)
	Tiles		Total value	Score
Ex. 1			4+5=9	9
Ex. 1	1+3=4	2+3=5	4+5=9	9
Ex. 2			5+11=16	6
Ex. 2	2+3=5	5+6=11	5+11=16	6
Ex. 3			10+10=20	0
Ex. 3	5+5=10	4+6=10	10+10=20	0
Ex. 4			3+11=14 or 6+11=17	7
Ex. 4	1+2=3 (or 6)	5+6=11	3+11=14 or 6+11=17	7

When a hand is formed from two tiles that are not a named pair, Wong, or Gong, the total pips on both tiles are counted and any tens digit is dropped; the resulting ones digit (the sum of all pips modulo 10) gives the final score.

There is one exception. The 1-2 and the 2-4 tiles which form the Gee Joon pair together, can act as limited wild cards singly. When used as part of a hand of mixed tiles, these tiles may be scored as either 3 or 6, whichever results in a higher hand value. For example, a hand of 1-2 (scored as +6 instead of the face value of +3) and 5-6 (+11) scores as seven rather than four.

If the player has both the 1-2 and 2-4 tiles, those collectively form the highest-ranked named pair and should be used together to form an unbeatable rear hand.

=== Ties ===
When the player and dealer display hands with the same score, the one with the highest-valued tile (based on the named pair rankings described above) is the winner. For example, a player's hand of 3-4 and 2-2 (Chit and Bon) and a dealer's hand of 5-6 and 5-5 (Foo and Mooy) would each score one point. However, since the dealer's 5-5 (Mooy) outranks the other three tiles, they would win the hand.

If both have a bonus combination (Wong or Gong) or the scores are tied, and if the player and dealer each have an identical highest-ranking tile, then the dealer wins. For example, if the player held 2-2 and 1–6 (Bon and Tit), and the dealer held 2-2 and 3–4 (Bon and Chit), the dealer would win since the scores (1 each) and the highest-ranked tiles (2-2 Bon) are the same. The lower-ranked tile in each hand is never used to break a tie.

There are two exceptions to the method described above. First, although the Gee Joon tiles form the highest-ranking pair when used together, when used as single tiles in a mixed hand, for tiebreaking purposes, they fall into the mixed-number ranks according to the number of pips. That is, the 2-4 ranks sequentially below the Chop Chit tiles (3-4 and 2-5), and the 1-2 ranks sequentially last overall, below the Chop Ng tiles (3-2 and 1-4). Second, any zero-zero tie is won by the dealer, regardless of the tiles in the two hands.

== Strategy ==
Hand formation examples
Deal					Score
Deal	A (2+2=4)	B (1+5=6)	C (5+6=11)	D (4+5=9)	Score
Ex. 1	Hand 1A		Hand 1B		0,0
Ex. 1	A+B (4+6=10)		C+D (11+9=20)		0,0
Ex. 2	Hand 2A		Hand 2B		5,5
Ex. 2	A+C (4+11=15)		B+D (6+9=15)		5,5
Ex. 3	Hand 3A		Hand 3B		3,7
Ex. 3	A+D (4+9=13)		B+C (6+11=17)		3,7

The key element of pai gow strategy is to present the optimal front and rear hands based on the tiles dealt to the player. For any four random tiles, there are three ways to arrange them into two hands, assuming that a named pair cannot be formed. However, if there is at least one pair among the tiles, there are only two distinct ways to form two hands.

The player must decide which combination is most likely to give a set of front/rear hands that can beat the dealer, or at least break a tie in the player's favor. In some cases, a player with weaker tiles may deliberately attempt to attain a push so as to avoid losing the bet outright. Many players rely on superstition or tradition to choose tile pairings.

== In popular culture ==
The film Premium Rush (2012) features Pai Gow play as an integral plot element.

== See also ==
- Kiu kiu
- Tien Gow
- Pusoy dos
