= Madiao =

Chinese card game

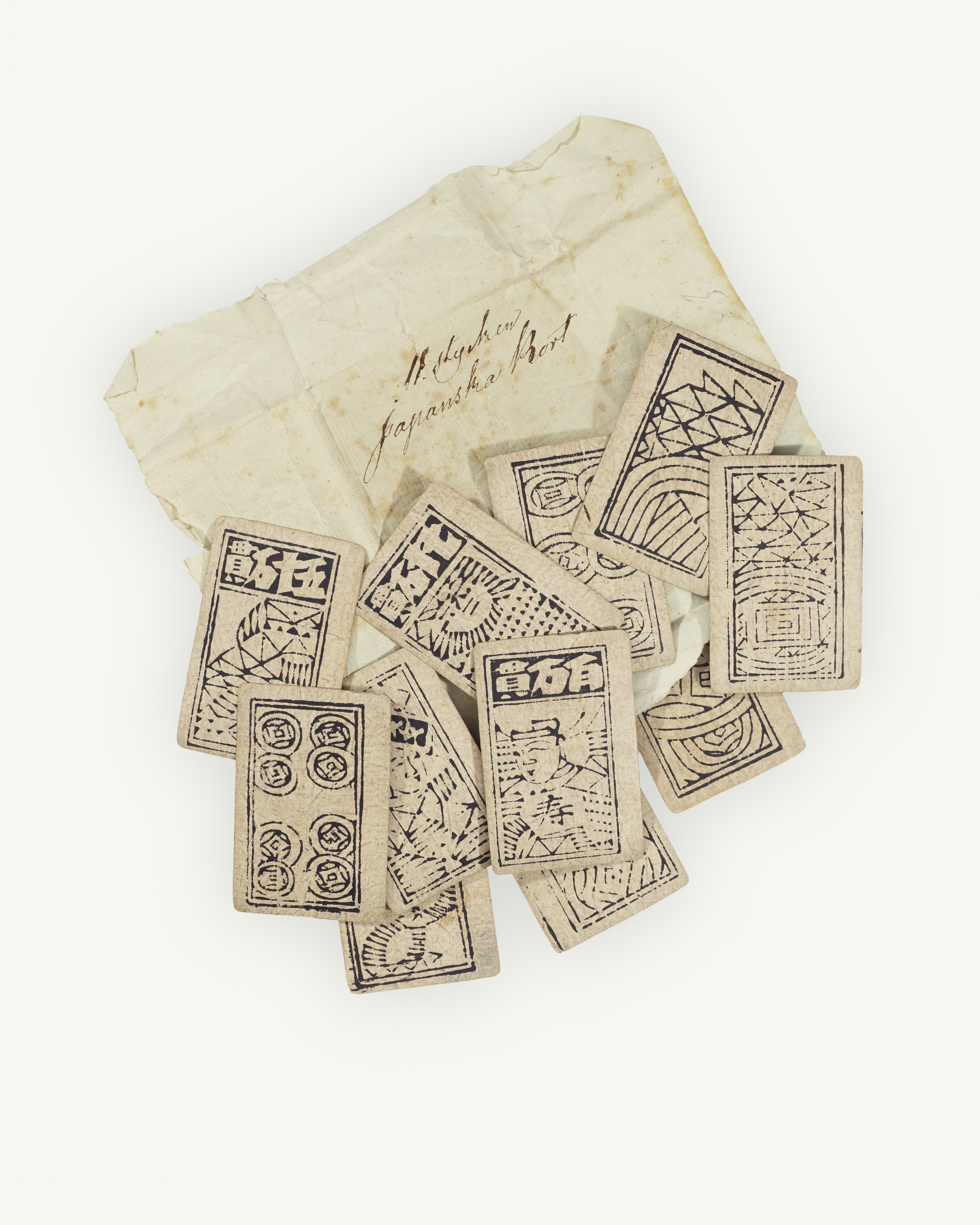
- 11 out of the 40 cards
- Origin: China
- Type: Trick-taking game
- Players: 4
- Skills: Tactics and strategy
- Cards: 40 money-suited cards
- Play: Counter-clockwise
- Playing time: 20 minutes
- Chance: Medium

Madiao (simplified Chinese: 马吊; traditional Chinese: 馬弔; pinyin: mǎdiào), also ma diao, ma tiu or ma tiao, is a late imperial Chinese trick-taking gambling card game, also known as the game of paper tiger. The deck used was recorded by Lu Rong in the 15th century and the rules later by Pan Zhiheng and Feng Menglong during the early 17th century. Korean poet Jang Hon (1759-1828) wrote that the game dates back to the Yuan dynasty (1271-1368). It continued to be popular during the Qing dynasty until around the mid-19th century. It is played with 40 cards, and four players.

In Chinese, mǎ (马) means "horse" and diao (吊) means "hanged" or "lifted". The name of the game comes from the fact that three players team against the banker, like a horse raising one shoe (banker), with the other three remaining hooves on the ground (three players).

== Description ==
A set of madiao consists of 40 cards of four suits:

- Cash or coins (纹, wen): 11 cards, from 9 to 1, half cash, and zero cash. This suit is in reverse order with zero cash as the highest while 9 cash is the lowest. This is a feature found in many of the oldest known games including ganjifa, tarot, ombre, maw, and tổ tôm. The half cash and zero cash did not exist in Lu Rong's account.
- Strings of coins (索瘠, suǒ jí): 9 cards, from 1 to 9 strings.
- Myriads of strings (万 or 萬, wàn): 9 cards, from 1 to 9 myriad.
- Tens of myriads (十, shí): 11 cards, from 20 myriad to 90 myriad, and of hundred myriad, thousand myriad, and myriad myriad. The latter two cards were dropped from the deck by the end of the 19th century. There is no card of 10 myriad as it would share the same name as its suit.

Each card of myriads or tens (of myriads) along with the zero cash was illustrated with one of the 108 Stars of Destiny of the Chinese novel the Water Margin attributed to Shi Nai'an. The characters depicted on these cards can vary depending on the region or manufacturer. Usually they play no role in games, however in Feng's version they do. In the suits of cash and strings, the pips were copied from banknotes such as the jiaozi and jiaochao. Unlike the other cards, the half cash displays a sprig of flowers.

Ten cards contain red stamps mimicking banknote seals are known as red cards which carry bonuses: Myriad Myriad, Thousand Myriad, Hundred Myriad, 20 Myriad, 9 Myriad, 1 Myriad, 9 Strings, 1 String, Zero Cash, and 9 Cash.

== Game ==
=== Rules of the game ===
Four players; one banker three others.

==== Dealing ====
Seating and the banker is decided through drawing the highest card, or by dice. The banker decides what the stakes are for the hand (it should be an even number so it can be split and within the margins agreed by consensus). The player to the banker's left shuffles then passes the deck to the banker's right who becomes the dealer. The dealer cuts and reveals a card. If the card is a 4 or 8, he or she deals first to themselves. If it's a 3 or 7, the banker is dealt first. If it's a 2 or 6, the shuffler is dealt first. If it's a 1, 5, 9, Zero Cash, Half Cash, Hundred Myriad, Thousand Myriad, or Myriad Myriad, the banker's opposite gets dealt first. Each player is dealt 8 cards counter-clockwise, first as a batch of four cards then singles. The remaining eight cards form the stock which is flipped to reveal the bottom card.

==== Declarations ====
A player that has at least five cards from any suit can force a redeal. If a player has the four lowest cards of each suit (20 Myriad, 1 Myriad, 1 String, 9 Cash), he will automatically win 1 stake each from the other 3 players and cards are dealt again. The banker is chosen again by picking the high card.

A player with any of the following melds automatically wins and will become the next banker. Everyone except the player holding the Hundred Myriad has to pay for the following:

- Myriad Myriad, 9 Myriad, 9 Strings, Zero Cash: 4 stakes
- Myriad Myriad, Hundred Myriad, 9 Myriad, 9 Strings, Zero Cash: 5 stakes
- Flush: 4 stakes
- Flush of Tens with the Hundred Myriad: 5 stakes
- Eight reds: 6 stakes
- Eight reds containing Hundred Myriad: 7 stakes
- Myriad Myriad, 20 Myriad, 9 Myriad, 1 Myriad, 9 Strings, 1 String, Zero Cash, 9 Cash: 8 stakes

==== Play ====
The first person who was dealt leads. In a counter-clockwise rotation, each player then tries to take tricks; following suit is not required but only the highest card of the suit played wins. Players can also discard (slough) their card face down if they can't or won't win the trick (this is similar to Tien Gow, Tam cúc, Six Tigers, Ganjifa, Kaiserspiel, and Brazilian Truco). Discarding face up is penalized with paying two stakes. Each player tries to win at least two tricks to avoid paying the banker. If the banker loses, then he'll have to pay the winners. Anyone who has not won one of the first seven tricks will automatically lose the last trick regardless of the strength of their final card. It is a strategy game requiring the cooperation of players against the banker. The Hundred Myriad is an important card to protect or capture as it figures in many bonuses.

==== Payment ====
After all eight tricks have been played, the revealed card from the stock is removed to expose the card under it. If this card is the highest card of its suit, the one who played the second highest has to pay the other three 1 stake each unless it was sloughed face down.

A player who wins a trick with the Hundred Myriad and makes exactly two tricks get 1 stake from the other two players and 3 stakes from the banker. If the banker does this, he wins 3 stakes from each player and will remain the banker for the next hand.

The following are payments between the banker and the other players:

- Winning a trick with the highest card of a suit (if the first upcard of the stock is the highest, the second highest of the same suit takes its place): 1 stake (Only those that reached the minimum of two tricks are eligible to receive this bonus.)
- Failing to reach the minimum with the Hundred Myriad: 1 stake (Consolation for simply being dealt the Hundred Myriad.)
- Winning at least three tricks: 1 stake
- Making minimum but losing the Hundred Myriad: 2 stakes
- Winning with the Myriad Myriad, Thousand Myriad, and Hundred Myriad: 3 stakes
- Winning with the Myriad Myriad, Thousand Myriad, Hundred Myriad, and Zero Cash: 4 stakes
- Slam (winning all eight tricks): 8 stakes

Player to the right becomes the next banker with special exceptions mentioned above. Play ends after everyone has had a chance to be the banker.

=== Evolution of the rules ===
During the Qing dynasty, the rules of the game became ever more complex with some variants having hundreds of rules. More bonuses could be melded and the discarded cards in the stock could be used. The Kangxi Emperor (1661-1722) banned the manufacturing and sale of cards in 1691. However, the game continued to remain popular and was played by government officials as well as members of the imperial family.

During the late Ming dynasty, new card games often dropped the suit of tens but kept the Thousand Myriad for a total of 30 cards like Khanhoo. During the Qing dynasty, the popularity of three-suited games led to the printing of stripped decks. Some draw-and-discard games combined multiple decks of three-suited cards leading to the birth of mahjong in the mid-19th century.

== See also ==
- Four color cards
- Khanhoo
- Chinese playing cards

== Bibliography ==
- Lo, Andrew (2000), "The Late Ming Game of Ma Diao", The Playing-Card: Journal of the International Playing Card Society (XXIX, No. 3), pp. 115–136, The International Playing-Card Society.
- Lo, Andrew (2003), "The 'Yezi Pu' (Manual of Leaves)", The Playing-Card (XXXI, No. 5), pp. 86-96, The International Playing-Card Society.
- Lo, Andrew (2004), "China's Passion for Pai: Playing Cards, Dominoes, and Mahjong". In: Mackenzie, C. and Finkel, I., (eds.), Asian Games: The Art of Contest. New York: Asia Society, pp. 216–231.
