= Ceki =

Asian card game

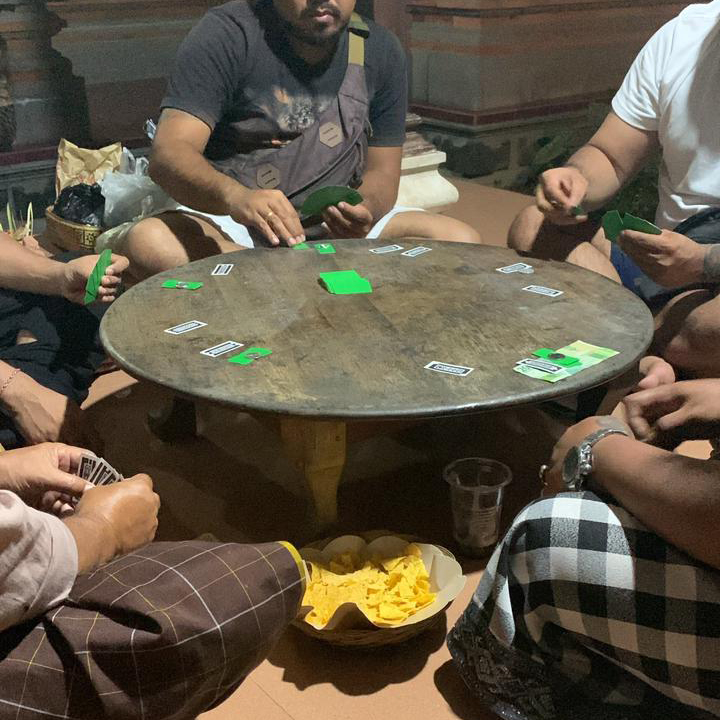
- A session in Bali, 2023
- Origin: China, Southeast Asia
- Alternative names: Koa
- Type: Draw and discard
- Players: 2-6
- Skills: Hand management
- Cards: 120 cards

Related games
- Chinese playing card • Mahjong

Ceki (pronounced /tʃəki/) is a type of card deck and card game historically played across maritime Southeast Asia, including Malaysia, Singapore, and Indonesia, introduced by Chinese and Peranakan communities in the region. Ceki is a descendant of money suited Chinese playing cards illustrated by figures of Water Margin (水滸傳 Shuǐhǔ zhuàn) characters which underwent simplification and abstraction. Ceki decks could be played for several games, and during the colonial period ceki was played by various social groups openly as means of entertainment and socialization, and more illicitly for gambling. Interest to ceki declined considerably at the dawn of the 21st century, but today ceki is still played in certain regions such as the Minangkabau lands of West Sumatra and Bali.

== Name ==
Several sources assume that the word ceki (Jawi چکي, Javanese ꦕꦼꦏꦶ, Balinese ᬘᭂᬓᬶ) was derived from Hokkien phrases such 一枝 chít ki “one card” or 二枝 jī ki "two cards". The term probably referred to the game played with the deck before it was used to refer the deck itself. In some localities, ceki is still understood as a type of game while the deck itself is known by other appellations such as daun ceki, ijo (Note: Van Ophuijsen Spelling System, read as i-yo /ijo/, not /idʒo/.)/iyu/yu, kartu Cina, kertu cilik, koa/kowa, and sikiah. Kamus Besar Bahasa Indonesia and Kamus Bahasa Melayu Malaysia dictionaries both use the spelling 'ceki' for standard Indonesian and Malaysian Malay, but there are numerous variant spellings that can be found in existing materials such as cuki, cekian, chĕki, cherki, chaqui, tjeki/tjĕki, dan tyekén.

== Deck ==
A ceki deck (called ꦏꦼꦥꦭ kepala in Javanese) consists of three suits, each suit consist of 9 pips and an honor card, totalling in 30 cards. Each card has a twin, so a single deck consists of 60 cards in total and most games need at least two decks with 120 cards. The 30 types of cards used in ceki can be seen in the table below:

Suit/Value	Honor	1/一	2/二	3/三	4/四	5/五	6/六	7/七	8/八	9/九
Coin										
String	centerus									
Myriad										

=== Value ===
In a ceki deck, only cards from the myriad suit have their values explicitly written with Chinese numeral. Value across suits are marked by frame indices; cards with the same frame have the same value. Games played with ceki usually entail making visual matches, in which the value of each card is not always needed to be known. The three honor cards have variable value that depends on the type of game played.

=== Suit symbols ===
The three suits of ceki are derived from Chinese cash which is related to mahjong suits. The suits do not have consistent name in maritime Southeast Asia and often called by idiosyncratic names by players across the region. This is partly due to the abstract imagery of the cards which are prone to be interpreted differently by players with no prior knowledge to the design conventions of Chinese playing card.

Symbol	Example in value of 8	Referenced object	Info	Alternative names
Coin	pus	pus	Single Chinese cash	tong (Hokkien 筒 'barrel'), piah (Hokkien 餅 ‘circle’), hitam, batik
String	pus	pus	String of cash	sok (Hokkien 索 ‘string’), tiau (Hokkien 條 counter word for long objects), lintrik (Javanese ꦭꦶꦤ꧀ꦠꦿꦶꦏ꧀ ‘line’), manik
Myriad	pus	pus	In the basic system, this suit refers to a unit of ten thousand cash coins represented by the character 萬/万. (Note: In Chinese expressions, 萬/万 'myriad' can also figuratively mean 'innumerable' instead of literal ten thousand.) But for ceki players that are not literate in Chinese, this suit came to be recognized for its figures which are abstraction of characters from the novel Water Margin. (Note: Characters depicted include: 燕青 Yàn Qīng (1), 武松 Wǔ Sōng (2), 吳用 Wú Yòng (3), 花榮 Huā Róng (4), 李逵 Lǐ Kuí (5), 雷橫 Léi Hén (6), 秦明 Qín Míng (7), 朱仝 Zhū Tóng (8), and 宋江 Sòng Jiāng (9).)	ban (Hokkien 万 'myriad'), wong (Javanese ꦮꦺꦴꦁ 'people'), cina

== Game ==
The ceki deck can be used for several games. The most basic type however, also known as ceki or koa, is a draw and discard game with similarities to mahjong, albeit with simpler rules. The basic game can be understood as follows:

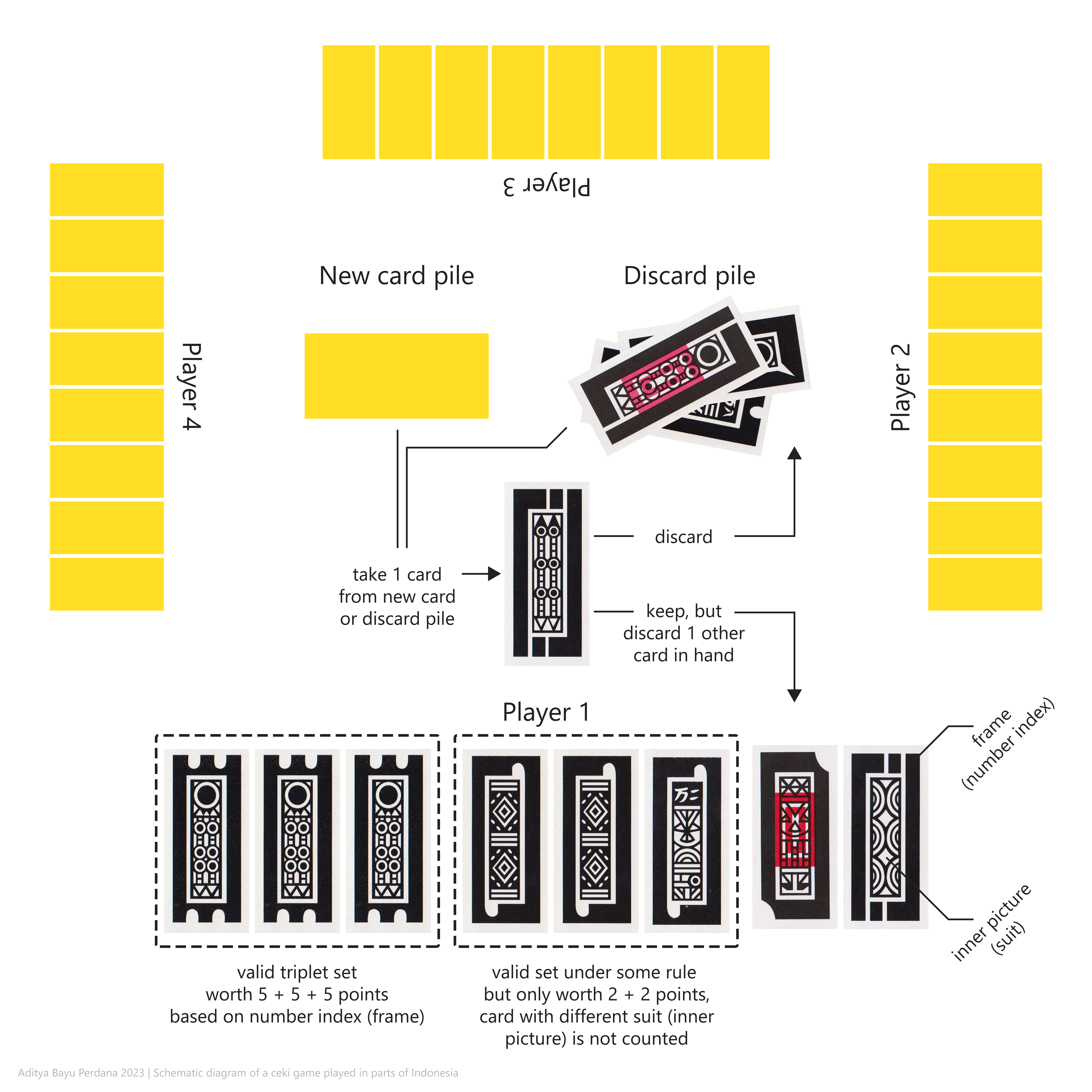
Scheme of basic ceki game.

- Gameplay requires 2-3 ceki decks (120-180 cards) that can be played with 2 to 6 players. Every player is handed 8 to 11 cards and the rest of the deck is piled downward facing on the middle of the table. Players are not allowed to see the hand of others.
- Players need to arrange the cards on their hands into triplets with identical frame indices and inner picture. In some variations, only the frame indices need to be the same while one or all three of the inner pictures can be different. Points are calculated based on the value of the frame indices, or other ways agreed upon by players.
- If players do not have eligible triplets, the first player draw one card from the new pile and discard one card from hand, before continuing to the second player. Players need to strategize which cards they need to keep and discard.
- The second player has the option to draw one card from the new pile or the topmost card in the discard pile, second player then discards one card from hand.
- Consecutive players continue to draw and discard to form eligible triplets on their hands. Depending on the play style, eligible triplets can be revealed as they are formed or only near the end.
- A player with only two cards left not within a triplet announces "ceki!" This warns other players that the player only need one more card to complete his last triplet. (Note: In similar vein with Uno where a player who plays their penultimate card must call "Uno" as a warning to the other players)
- The first player to make the entirety of given hand into eligible triplets is the winner and the session ends. In some variations, points are first calculated - there is a chance that the player who first shed his hand do not wind due to low value triplets compare to other players.

Its common to see modified aspects across regions, such as in triplets requisites, or point calculations. This results in variants such as balik satu, balik lima belas, chot, gonggong, and tantanan.

=== Other games ===
- Colek Tiga, a Malaysian game played by 2 to 3 people.
- Pak Tui, a Malaysian/Singaporean game similar to solitaire.
- Pèi, a Javanese game for 3 people which goal is to build hands with certain card combinations.
- Thothot, a Javanese game for 3 people which goal is to collect identical pairs of card.

== Gallery ==
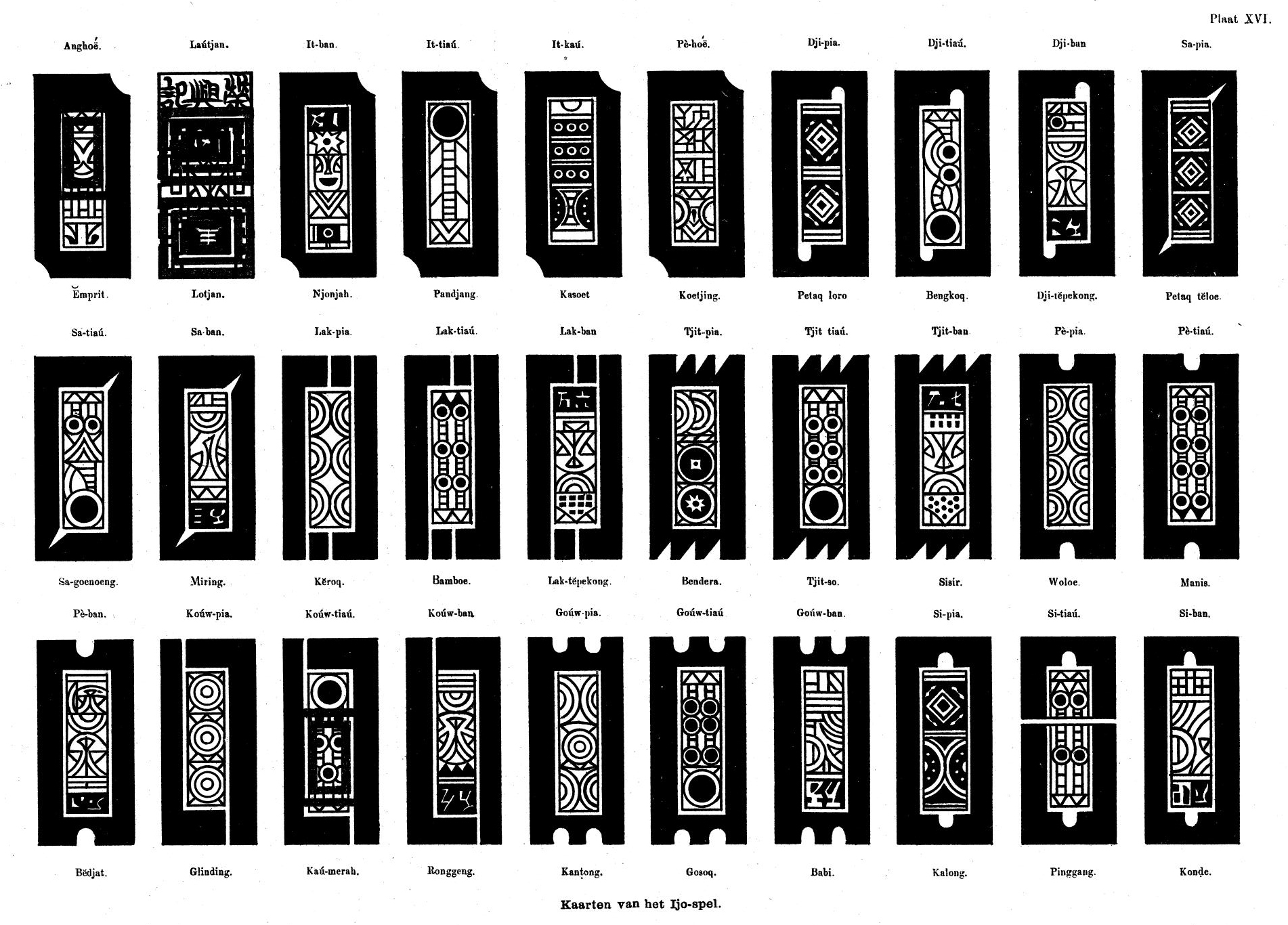
A ceki deck used in Java circa 1897 (presented in random order), documented by Mayer (1897:plaat XVI)

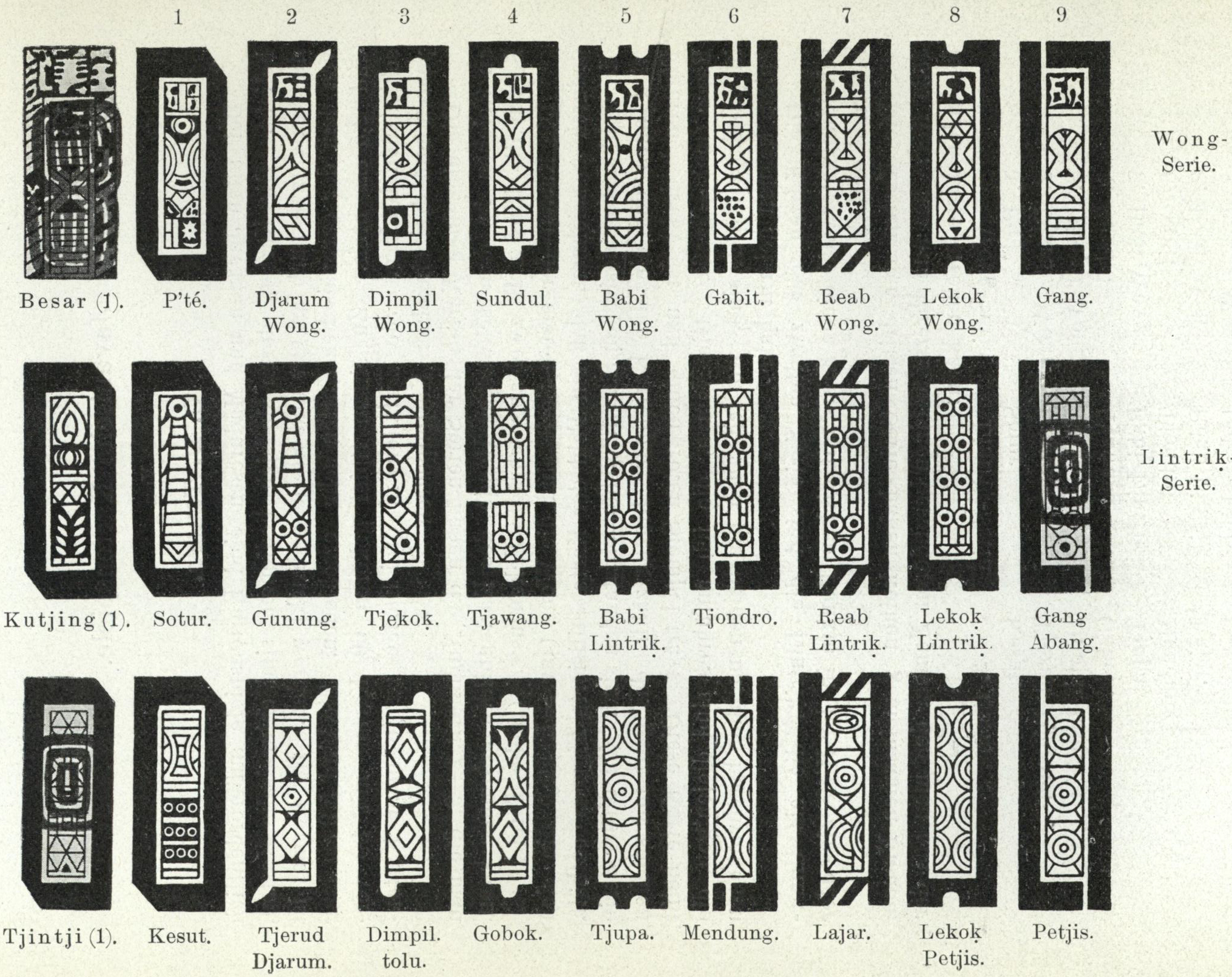
A ceki deck used in Java circa 1914, documented by Tauern (1914:46)

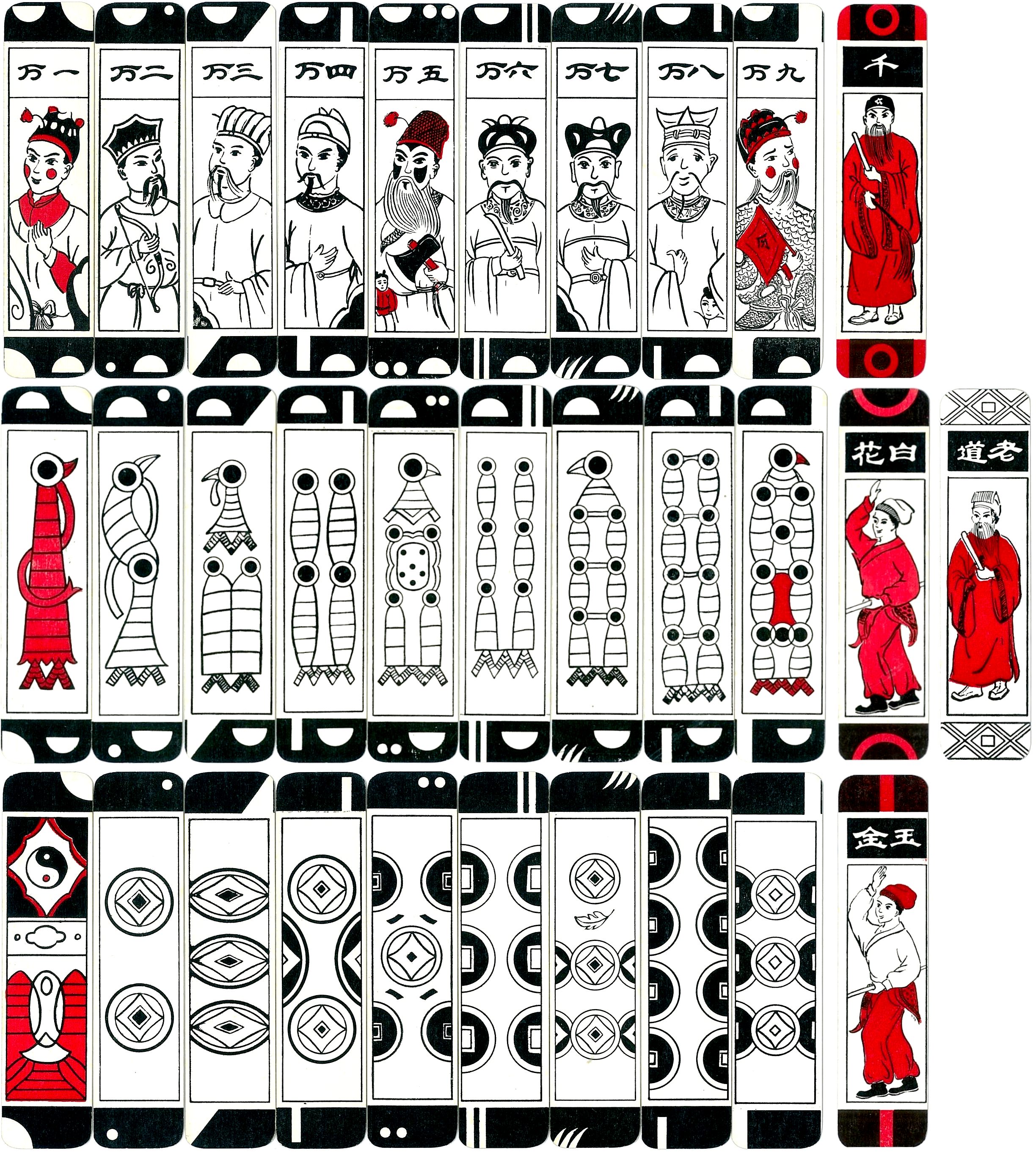
A money suited Chinese playing card from Tianjin, as comparison for ceki

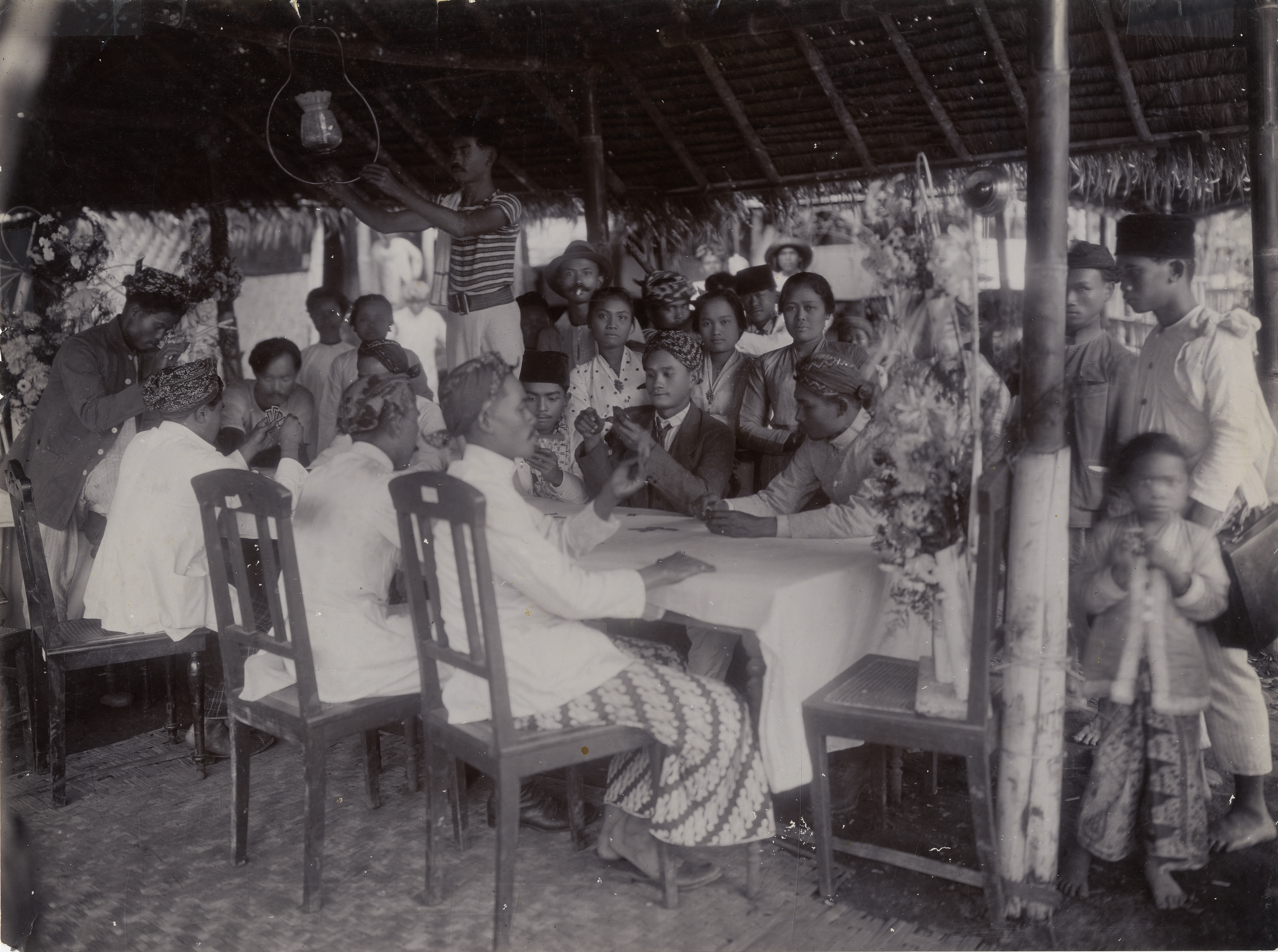
A play session in Java, circa 1925.

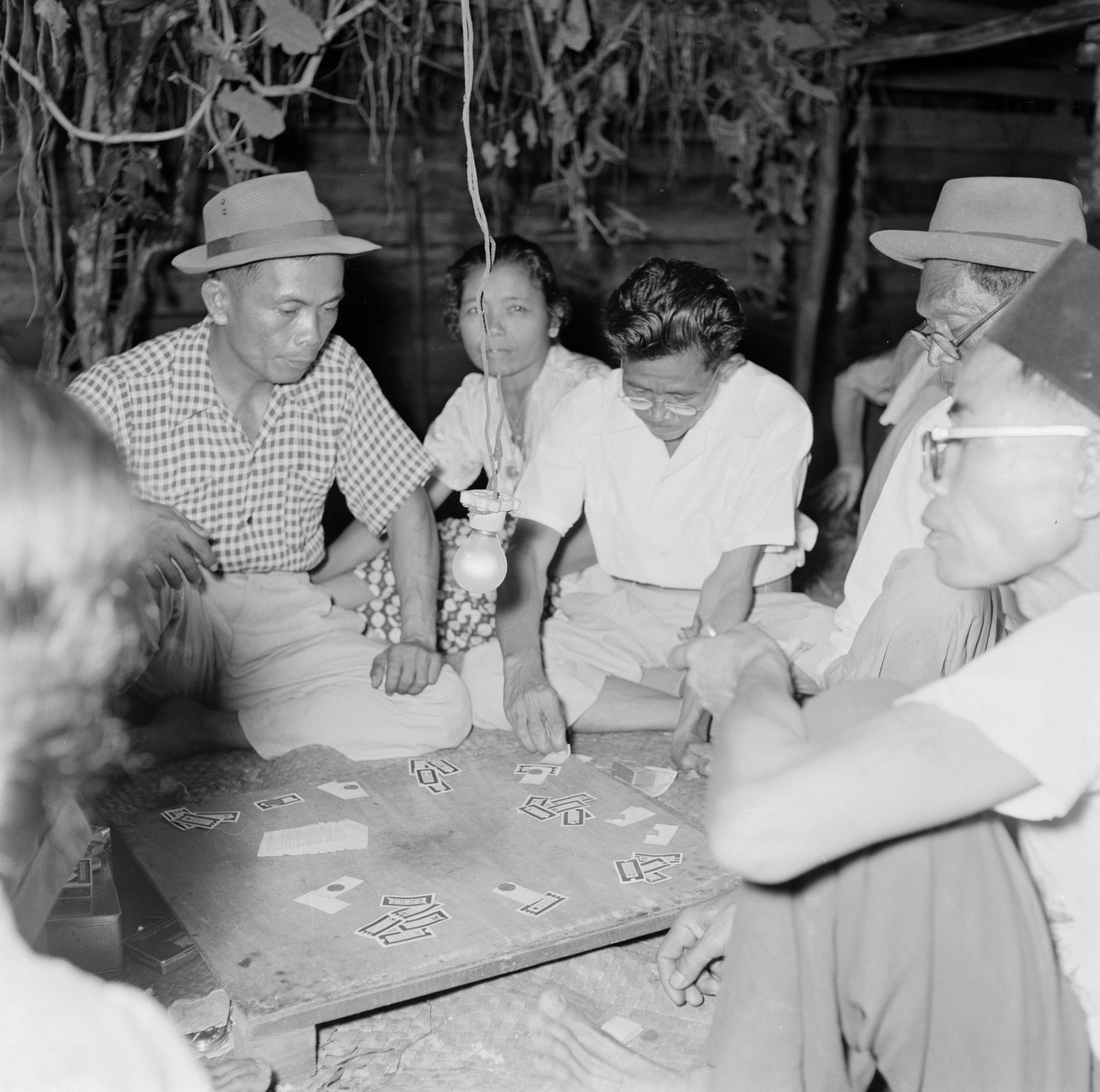
A play session in Paramaribo, Suriname, 1955
