= Studies of Flowers from Nature =

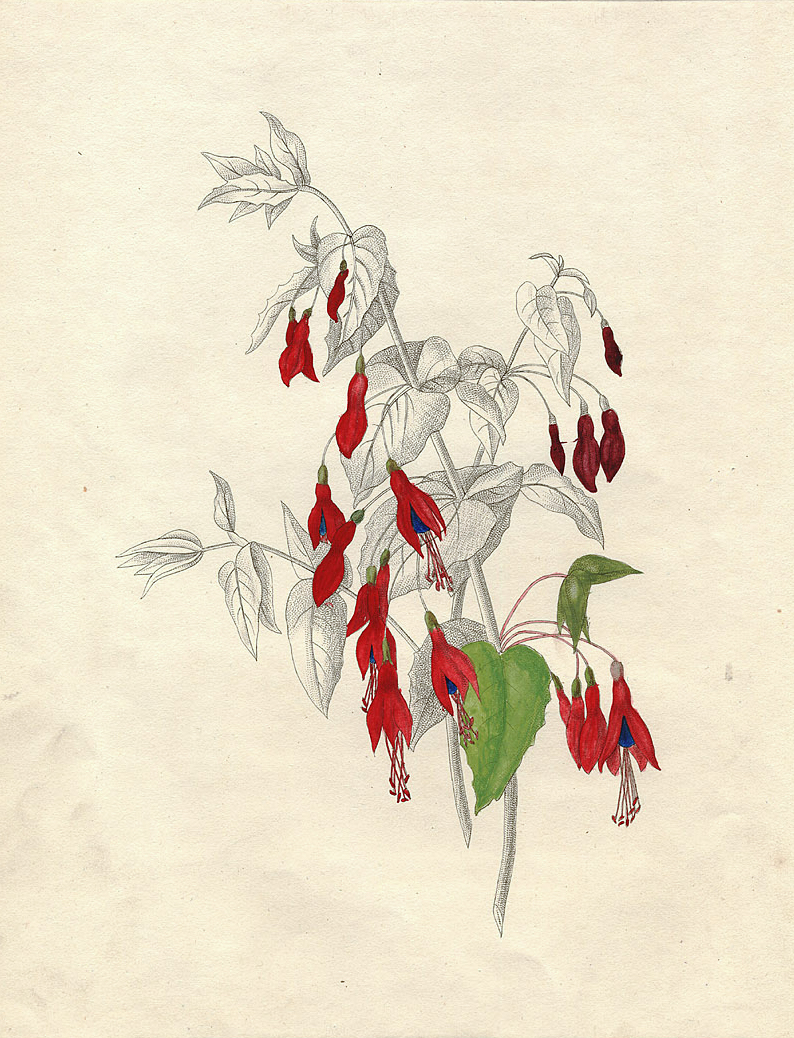
Plate of fuchsias by Miss Smith from Studies of Flowers from Nature, 1818–20. This plate was printed in outline to be colored by the book's owner and has been partially painted in.

Studies of Flowers from Nature is a 19th-century botanical copybook notable for the high quality of its illustrations by an artist known only as "Miss Smith."

== Publication history ==
Combining an instruction manual "for young ladies" with a coloring book, Studies of Flowers from Nature is illustrated by full-page, full-color plates of specimen flowers shown with their leaves. The artist, bylined as "Miss Smith," offers advice on drawing and on preparing colors for painting watercolors of flowers and includes a complete second set of plates in which the flowers are drawn only in outline so that the buyers can color them in themselves. Such copybooks were popular in the early 19th century, but few have survived; it is thought that owners tended to discard them after completing their painted pages.

The book was published by Ackermann of London by subscription, a common practice at the time, and sold for 5 guineas as single volume; it was also obtainable in 10 monthly parts issued between 1818 and 1820. One subscriber was Princess Elizabeth, daughter of King George III. Of the roughly 100 copies that were subscribed for, only a small handful are known to have survived. Studies of Flowers from Nature is valued today for the exceptionally high quality of the flower paintings.

== About the artist ==
Very little is known about Miss Smith, including her full name. It is possible that she may be the same person as another little-known botanical artist, Miss J. Smith, whose work appeared in William Sole's Menthae Britannicae, although that was published some twenty years earlier. Smith is recorded in a contemporary newspaper as "of Adwick Hall near Doncaster", and she wrote that her flowers came from the garden of a Mr. W. Crowder in Doncaster. There was a women's boarding school at Adwick Hall in the early 19th century, and Miss Smith may have been an instructor there.
