= Bai choi =

Vietnamese combination of arts

Bài chòi
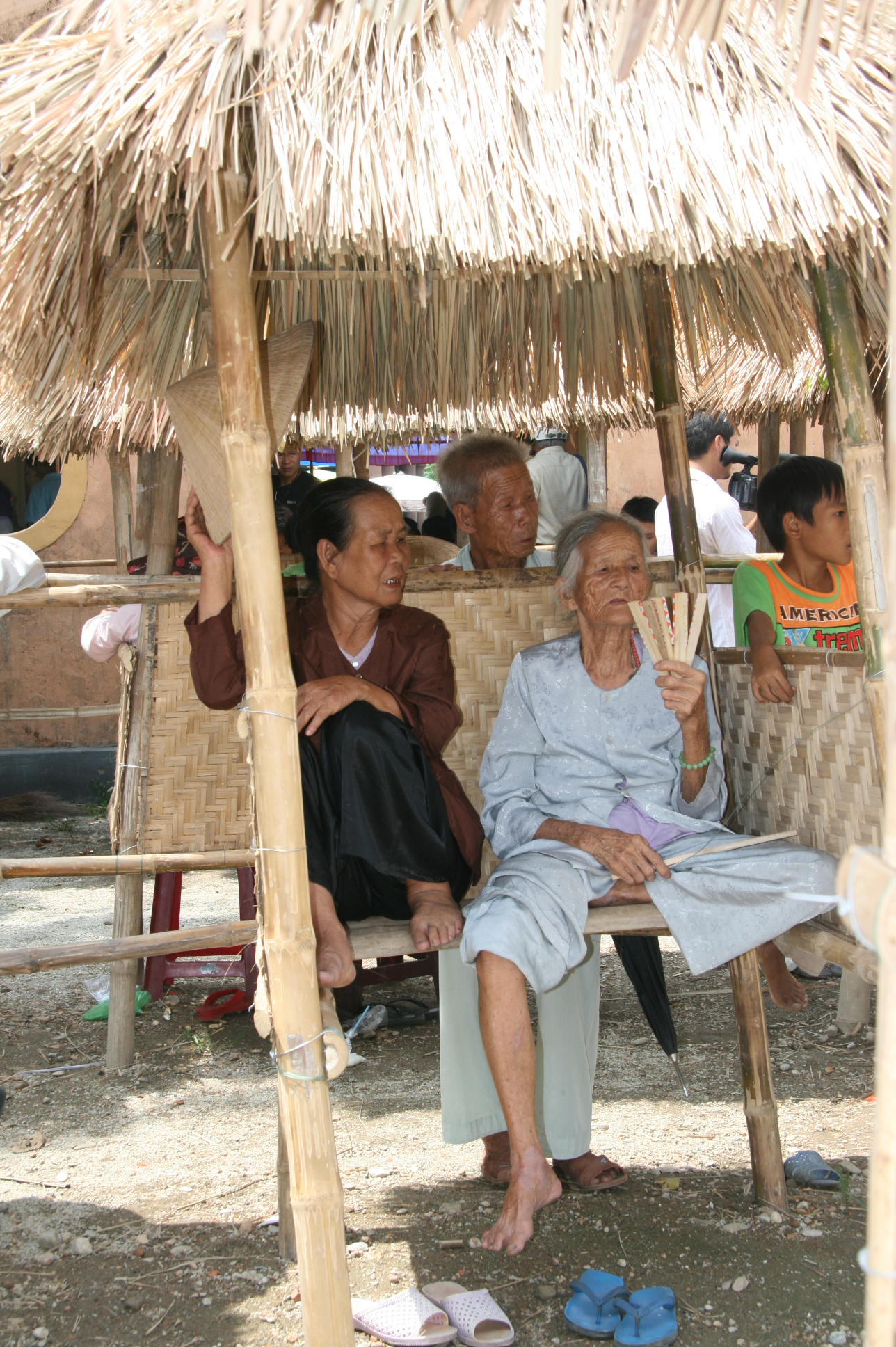
- Two old ladies playing Bài chòi
- Origin: Vietnamese
- Alternative name: Bài tới
- Players: 9-11 huts
- Cards: 33
- Deck: Money-suited cards set
- Play: Simultaneous
- Chance: High

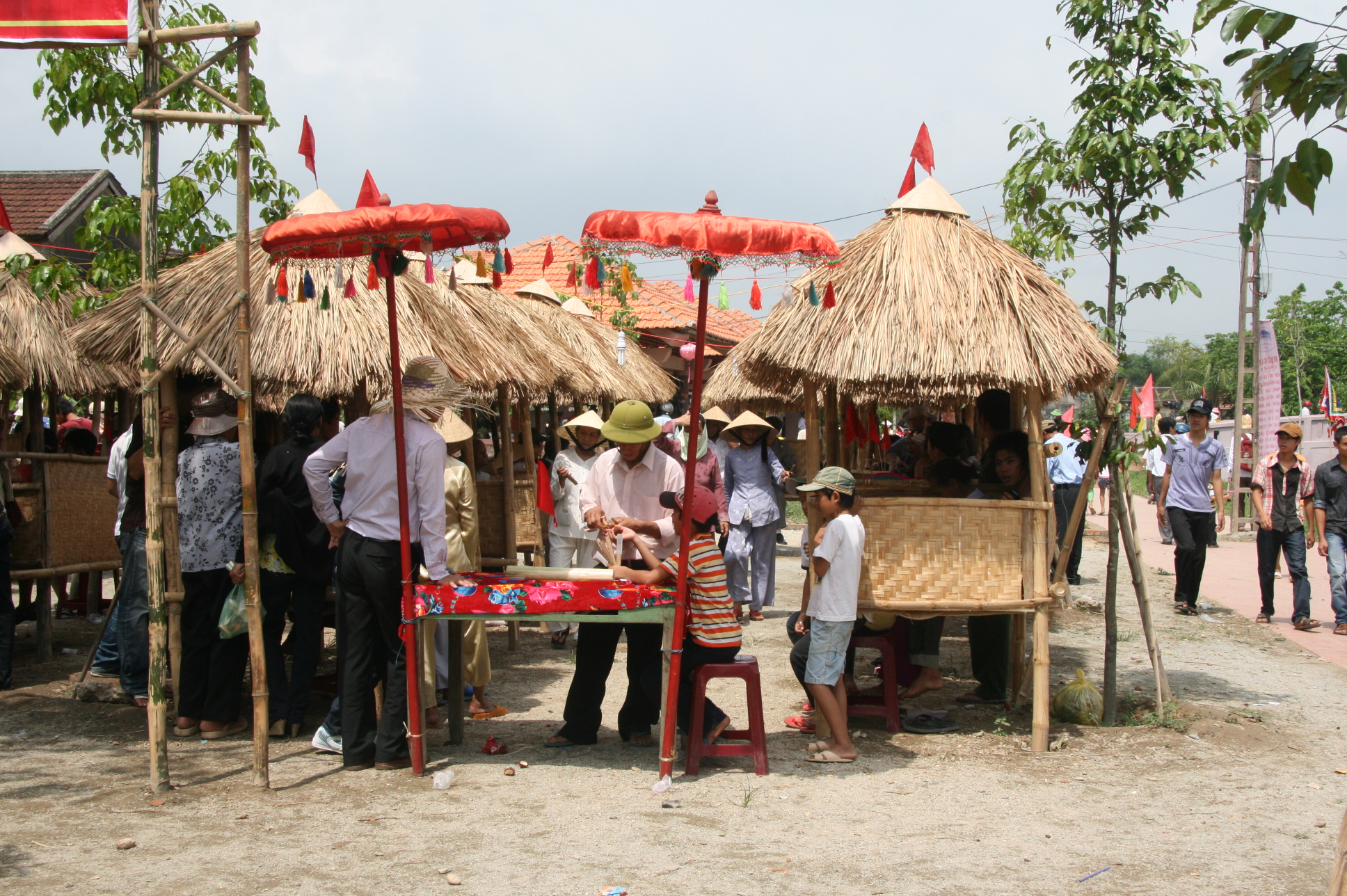
Hut to play Bài chòi

Bài Chòi (aka Bài tới in Huế) is a combination of arts in Central Vietnam including music, poetry, acting, painting and literature, providing recreation, entertainment and socialising within village communities. It was inscribed on the UNESCO's Intangible Cultural Heritage of Humanity list in 2017. Bài Chòi was recognised as Vietnam's national intangible cultural heritage during 2014-2016 by the Ministry of Culture, Sports and Tourism.

Bài Chòi games and performances involve a card game similar to bingo, played with songs and music performed by Hieu artists, during the Tết Nguyên Đán. In Hội An, Quang Nam, Bai Choi singing classes have been opened for secondary school students.

The bài chòi culture has also been introduced in Japan and in Germany.

== Origin ==
In the late 16th and early 17th centuries, many wild animals in the forest often came to destroy crops and disturb the lives of innocent people. To fight against wild animals, the villagers built very high huts on the edge of the forest. A young man was assigned to each hut to guard it. If he saw wild animals coming to destroy crops, he would beat drums and shout loudly to chase them away. During that process, to relieve boredom, people came up with ways to interact together through songs and chants.

To suit the circumstances of the time, people sitting inside the huts would sing and respond to each other from one hut to another. Not only that, people also created a way to play Tứ Sắc (similar to playing Tam cúc in the North). This form of playing cards and chanting (singing) between huts together for entertainment was popularly called "hô bài chòi," the origin of the later art of bài chòi.

Over time, so that more people could know how to play this song and chant, the entertainment events were gradually upgraded to a card game festival.

== Heritage range ==
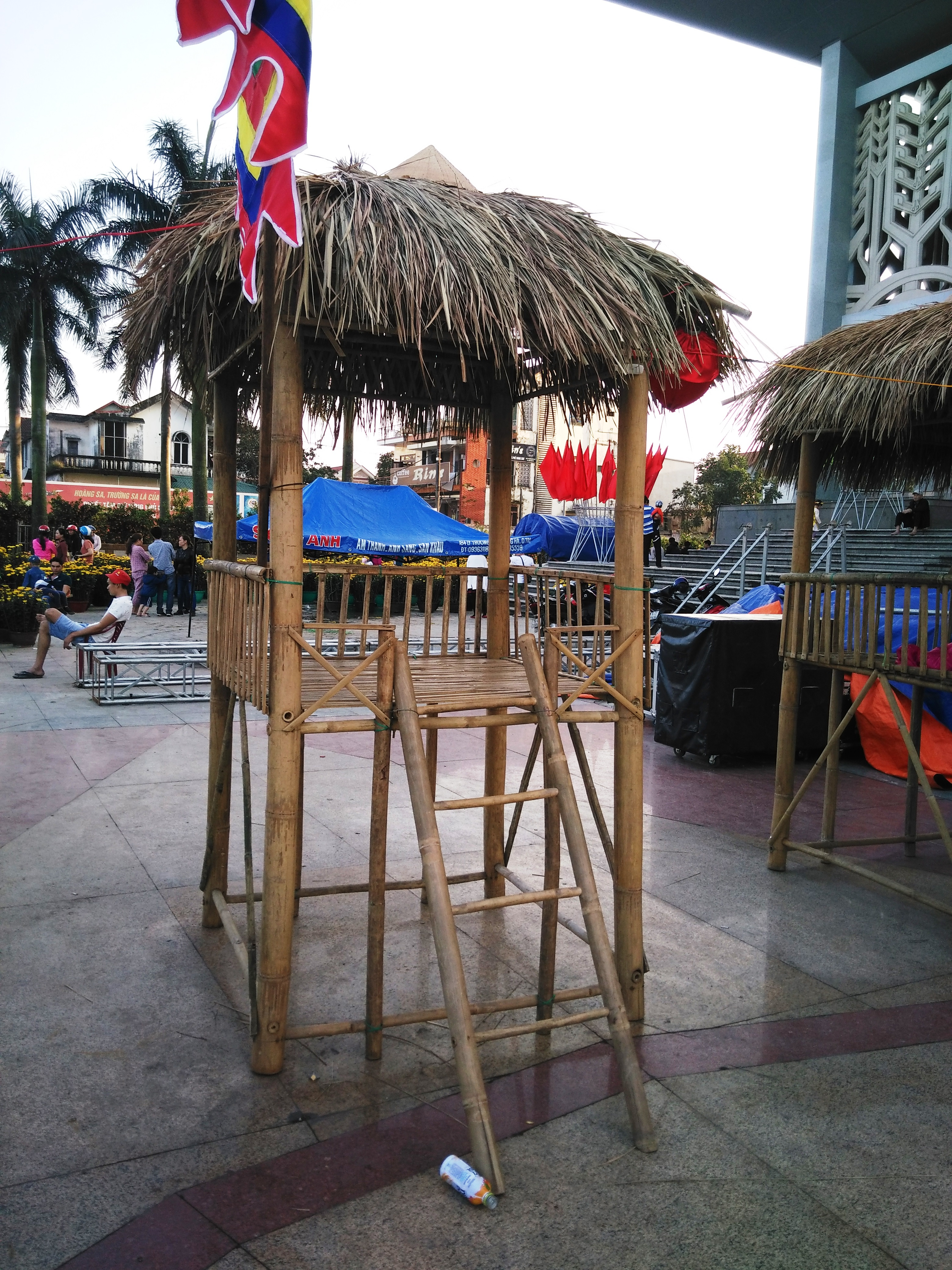
Bài chòi festival in Đông Hà during Tết 2018

The range of Bài Chòi includes 11 provinces and cities in the Central region from Quảng Bình to Bình Thuận (not including the Central Highlands provinces) The provinces in order from North to South are: Quảng Bình, Quảng Trị, Huế, Đà Nẵng, Quảng Nam, Quảng Ngãi, Bình Định, Phú Yên, Khánh Hòa, Ninh Thuận, and Bình Thuận.

== Performance method ==
Hát chòi is often organized as a festival.

This festival is often held in villages during Tết. People build 9, 11 or 13 huts, divided into 2 sides, each side having approximately 5 huts, each hut is 2-3m high, wide enough for a few people to sit and a central hut (chòi mẹ) in the middle for local dignitaries.

The deck of cards for bài chòi is an improved Chinese money-suited deck, consisting of 33 cards, with names converted into simple names such as: nhứt nọc, nhì nghèo, ông ầm, thằng bí, lá liễu, etc. The art is drawn on paper and stuck to bamboo cards. Each bamboo card has three cards, without duplicates.

The deck includes 3 suits, which are:

- Cash (文, Văn): ông Ầm, bánh hai, ba bụng, tứ tượng, ngũ ruột, sáu ghe, bảy liễu, tám miểng, chín cu, and chín gối.
- Myriads of Strings (萬, Vạn): bạch huê, nhứt trò, nhì bí, tam quăng, tứ móc, ngũ trợt, lục chạng, thất vung, bát bồng, and cửu điều.
- Strings of Cash (索, Sách): Thái Tử, nhứt nọc, nhì nghèo, ba gà, tứ sách, năm dụm, sáu bưởng, bảy thưa, tám dừng, and cửu chùa.

Each suit has 10 cards, and because there must be 33 cards (3 each for the maximum 11 huts), 3 more cards are added: ông ầm đen, tử cẳng đen, and cửu điều đen (the 3 cards of the same name are distinguished by being marked red) to have enough cards to play.

During the game, the chanter (i.e. the singer) shakes the card tube, draws one card and calls out the name of the card. To create more suspense and force players to speculate, the chanter shouts out a verse or a ca dao with the name of the card. Whoever wins the name of the card must knock on the bell so the waiter can bring the card. If you win three cards, that hut will "tới" and draw a long lottery. At that time, the shopkeeper holds up a small flag and a tray of wine is given as a prize to the winner. A paper bunting flag is also placed on the hut to mark a win.

To help entertain the game, there is also a traditional band consisting of harp, horn, drum, and drums that play when the hut "tới".

== Example Song ==
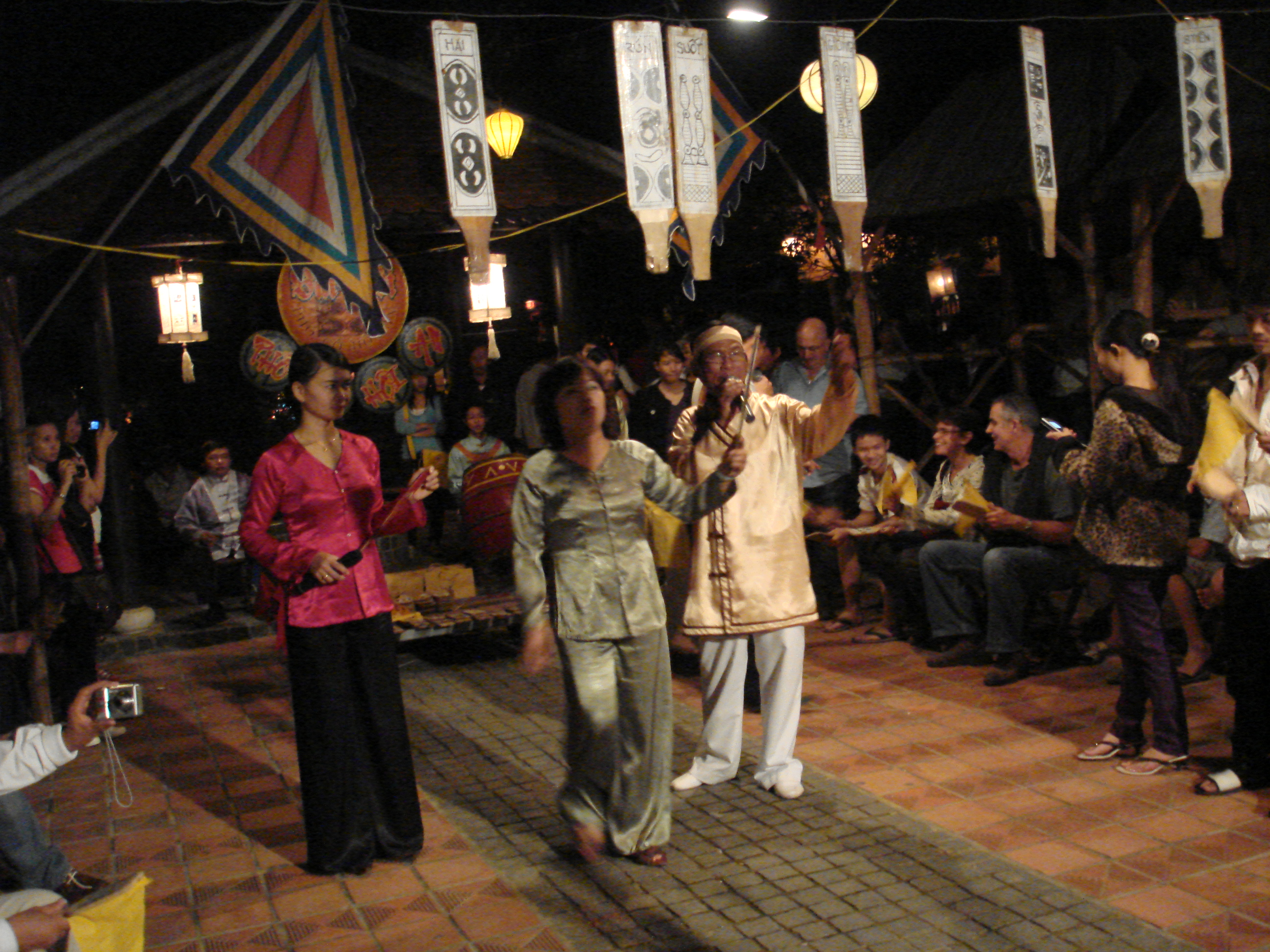
Singing bài chòi in Hội An

Đi đâu mang sách đi hoài

Cử nhơn không đậu, tú tài cũng không. (Nhứt Trò)

Ai làm thượng hạ bất thông

Bàng quang bể thủng sớm trông tối ngày. (Nhì Bí)

Nửa đêm gà gáy le te

Muốn đi rón rén đụng nghe cái ầm.(Ông Ầm)

Lưng choàng áo đỏ
Đầu đội khăn đen
Chân đi lèng quèng
Là ông chân gãy.(Tứ Cẳng)

Lội suối trèo non
Tìm con chim nhỏ
Về treo trước ngõ
Nó gáy cúc cu. (Chín Cu)

Chầu rày đã có trăng non

Để anh lên xuống có con em bồng. (Bát Bồng)

Đi đàng phải bịt khăn đen

Ở nhà vợ sắn vóc sen nhuộm điều. (Cửu Điều)

== See also ==
- Lô Tô - Vietnamese Bingo
- Xẩm - a type of Vietnamese folk music
- Bài Bất / Bài Tổ Tôm - a traditional Vietnamese money-suited card game
- Bài Tứ Sắc - a traditional Vietnamese four-color chess card game
- Bài Tam Cúc - a traditional Vietnamese two-color chess card game
- Mahjong - used to play traditional Vietnamese card games
- Lotería - a Bingo game from Mexico that also use cards and a singer
- UNESCO Intangible Cultural Heritage
