= Copybook (education) =

Handwriting exercise book

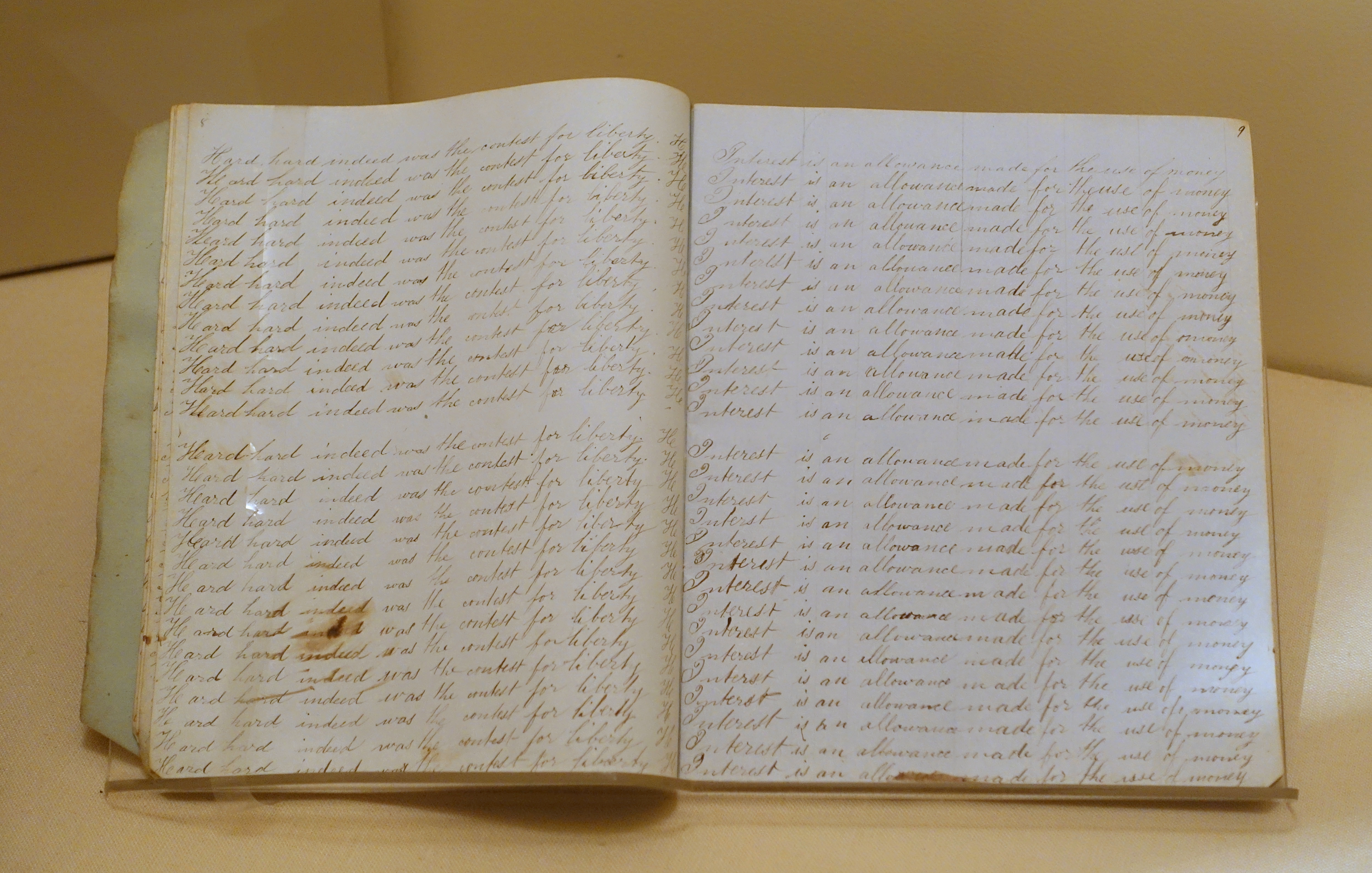
Penmanship copybook, Boston, Massachusetts, 1840-1850

A copybook, or copy book, is a book used in education that contains examples of handwriting and blank space for learners to imitate.

Typical uses include teaching penmanship and arithmetic to students. A page of a copybook typically starts with a copybook heading: a printed example of what should be copied, such as a single letter or a short proverb. The remainder of the page is blank, aside from horizontal lines. The student is expected to copy the example repeatedly down the page. By copying, the student is supposed to practise penmanship, spelling, reading comprehension, punctuation, and vocabulary.

== History ==
The American Instructor: Or, Young Man's Best Companion, published in 1748, was the first American copybook. The 1802 book The Port Folio advocates for the copybook method of learning fine penmanship, favoring it over the earlier practice of using "engraved models", citing the advantage of having the example text closer to the student's reproduction. The author adds, "A neat copybook has often laid the foundation, or shown the first symptoms, of taste in all the elegant arts of life."

== Uses ==
Because in the 18th century good penmanship was primarily considered an important business skill, copybooks of the period frequently were oriented towards autodidacts wishing to learn business skills, and therefore included chapters on general business management as well as lessons in accounting. Other copybooks, however, focused chiefly on writing and literacy, using maxims and sometimes Bible verses as their material. It was intended that students memorize not only correct penmanship, but correct morals as well, through exposure to traditional sayings.

Copybooks were also produced on geographical topics, initially requiring students to copy place names onto unlabelled maps, and later to recreate entire maps using a latitude and longitude grid.

There are also botanical copybooks, such as Studies of Flowers from Nature, that were popular in the 19th century for developing watercolor painting skills. Here, the student would paint an image for which the outline was already sketched (as in a modern coloring book), using as a model a finished watercolor provided by the book's illustrator.

== See also ==
- Notebook
- Exercise book
- Examination book
- Laboratory notebook
