= Tổ tôm =

Traditional Vietnamese playing cards

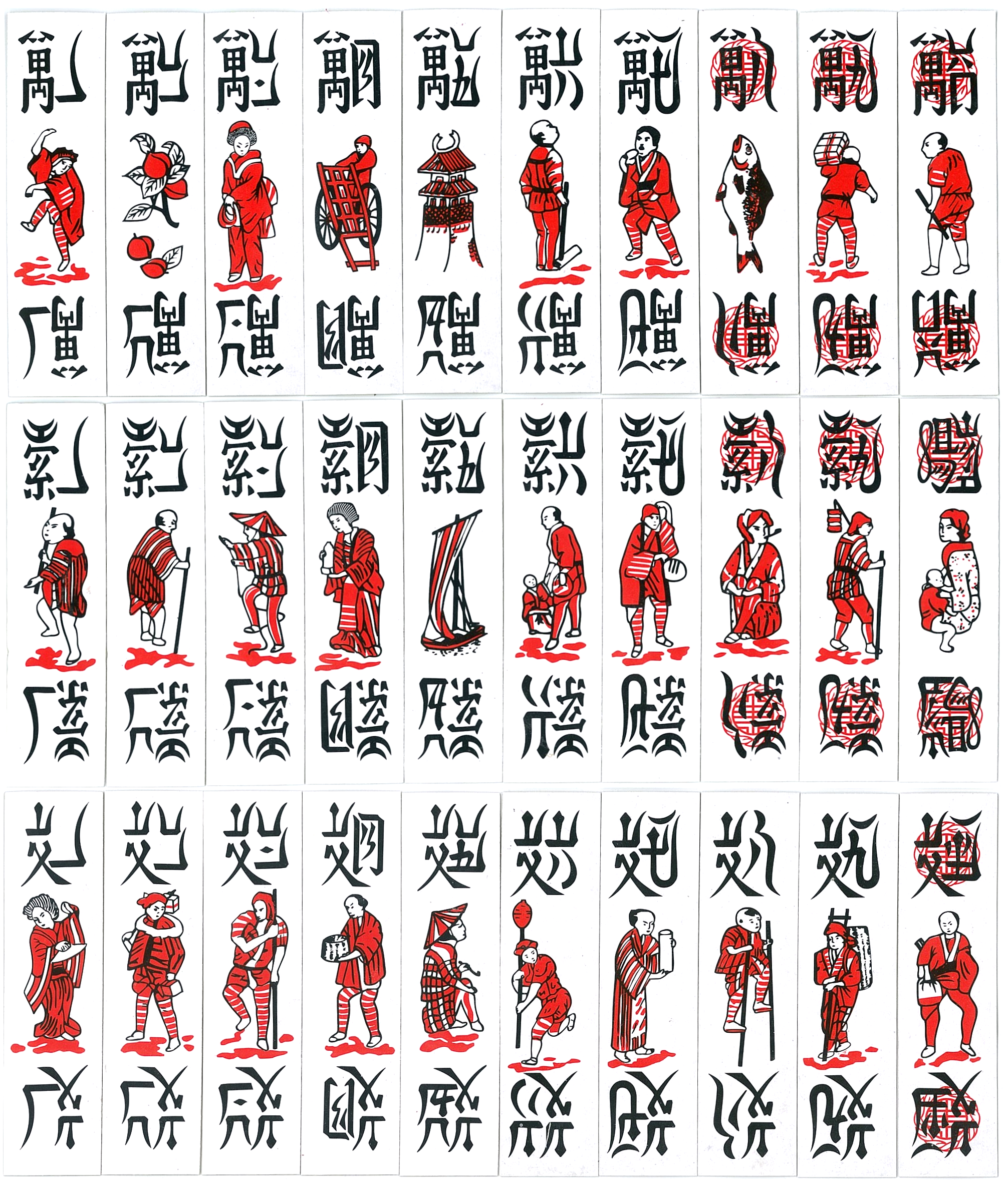
- Tổ tôm cards laid out in rows for each suit, and columns for each rank
- Origin: Khanhoo
- Alternative names: Tụ tam bài
- Type: Matching
- Family: Rummy
- Players: 5
- Cards: 120
- Deck: Money-suited cards set
- Play: Anticlockwise

Related games
- Khanhoo

Tổ tôm or Tụ tam bài (chữ Hán: 聚三牌, chữ Nôm: 祖𩵽) is a draw-and-discard card game played in Vietnam, usually by men. The game is often played at festivals. It is similar to the Chinese game of Khanhoo.

Literally, tổ-tôm means ‘nest of shrimps’; however, when written in Sino-Vietnamese characters (Chữ Nôm) it is read tụ tam (bài) (Chinese 聚 三 牌 ju san pai), ‘gathering three cards’, namely the three suits of Văn, Sách, and Vạn of the deck of cards.

During holidays and Tết, tổ tôm was often played by men and the elderly because it has some quite difficult rules and many variations, so young uneducated people and women in the past rarely played it. Tổ tôm is not as popular and common as tam cúc.

== History and origin ==
The origin of tổ tôm is still unclear, but by the 19th century in Vietnam, this card game was very popular, especially among the upper class who considered it an elegant game that required a lot of intelligence. Vietnamese literature mentions tổ tôm in a number of literary works, such as this proverb:

"Làm trai biết đánh tổ tôm
Uống trà Mạn Hảo xem Nôm Thúy Kiều."

== Card set ==
The game uses a type of Chinese money-suited pack consisting of 120 cards (called "quân"). There are three suits (called "hàng," "chất," or "hoa"): Cash (文, Văn), Strings of Cash (索, Sách), and Myriads of Strings (萬, Vạn). Each suit is divided into nine ranks (called "số") from one (一, called "Nhất") to nine (九, called "Cửu"), with some special cards called "yêu đỏ": Half Cash (called "Chi Chi"), Zero String (called "Không Thang" or "Thang Thang"), and Old Man (called "Ông lão" or "Ông cụ") respectively. There are four copies of each card unlike its four-suited kin, Bài bất.

The cards are made of narrow and long cardboard. One side is plain and the other side has pictures and words. The width of the card is about the width of two fingers. The length is longer than the middle finger.

Like the Hakka's Six Tigers deck, each card has a decorative picture in the middle that does not relate to the suit or rank. During French colonial rule, the Marseille firm A.Camoin & Cie designed the tổ tôm deck depicting people wearing traditional Japanese costumes from the Edo period. Of the cards, 18 depict men (eight of them wearing kyahan), four depict women, and four depict children. In addition, there are a few cards depicting other common models in Japanese painting: a carp, peaches, a pavilion, and a boat.

The head and foot of the card give the rank and suit in chữ Hán, right-side up at the head, and upside-down at the foot. The names of the suit is on the left and the numbers are on the right. The way to identify the three suits can be summarized as follows:

"Vạn vuông, Văn chéo, Sách loằng ngoằng".
approximate translation: "Myriads are square, Cash are crossed [like an "X"], and Strings are confusing"

The Half Cash, Zero String, and Old Man cards have red markings over the characters (called "yêu đỏ" or "yêu điều"). The four cards of 8 myriad, 9 myriad, 8 string, and 9 string also have red marks. Because there are illustrations, even those who don't know Chinese can identify the cards by the imagery.

According to Nguyễn Văn Vĩnh, in addition to playing tổ tôm, the deck of cards can also be used to play tài bàn, kiệu and đánh chắn, although some cards must be removed to suit the game. There is also a patience game called phá trân.

== Rules ==
To play tổ tôm, there are five people (called "chân") who sit on a mat to form a circle and each have to draw and discard to form a hand of twenty-one cards. Sitting at a table is more awkward because they normally have four sides. The five players are collectively called "làng."

The dealer will divide the cards into six stacks of 20 cards; one stack is given to each player, and the remaining stack remains in the middle of the mat to serve as the talon (called "bài nọc"). Each person will pick up their stack, fan their cards so they can see, and then try to arrange them into melds (called "phu").

The game begins with the draw. The dealer draws two cards from the talon. One card, called the "bài bốc," is placed face up next to the talon. The dealer holds the other card in his hand. At this point, the dealer has 21 cards, the deck has 18 cards, the draw card is next to it, and the other four players each have 20 cards.

The dealer plays the first card to his right, called the "cửa," in counter-clockwise order. The next player, called the "tay dưới," has two options to create a set:

1. ăn – "eat" or pick up the card that was just played
2. không ăn – don't pick up the card

After choosing an option, they must play a card from their hand to their right for the next player. If they "don't eat," they can draw a card from the talon.

=== Melds ===
Like Khanhoo, melds are divided into certain types. A meld must have at least three cards according to certain requirements. In addition, the player's hand is not complete until they form a special meld (called "lưng").

- Phu dọc: a run of three or more cards in the same suit
- Phu bí: (three-of-a-kind) three or more cards of the same rank but each from a different suit
- Phu yêu: one or more yêu cards(consist of 1 myriad, 1 string, 1 cash, half cash, zero string, old man)

In addition, there are special melds:

- 1, 2, 3 Cash (not really special but traditionally listed as one)
- 9 Cash, 1 String, 1 Myriad
- 8 Cash, 2 Strings, 2 Myriad
- 7 Cash, 3 Strings, 3 Myriad (called "tôm")
- Zero String, 9 Strings, 9 Myriad
- Zero String, 9 Strings, Old man
- Half Cash, 8 Strings, 9 Myriad (called "lèo")
- Trùng tam: three identical cards immediately after dealing (called "khàn") or eaten from players (called "phỗng")
- Trùng tứ: four identical cards immediately after dealing (called "thiên khai") or eaten from players (called "dậy khàn")

The dealer goes first, puts his cards down on the mat, and picks a card from the deck. When the deck is empty, the game is over. If no one forms a winning hand (called "ù"), the game is considered a draw (called "hòa").

=== Winning ===
A winning hand consists of 21 cards, all of which are in melds. There should be no un-melded cards and must have at least one special meld. Un-melded cards are called "què." The yêu cards are considered a meld, so are not considered què. There are many types of winning hands:

1. Ù suông (straight win): win with no special features
2. Ù thông: Win two consecutive games
3. Ù tam (tứ, ngũ, ...) khôi: Win three (four, five, ...) consecutive games
4. Thiên ù: win immediately after being dealt
5. Ù bạch thủ: hand has no special meld and one pair, waiting for a single card to form with the pair to become a special meld (trùng tam) and win
6. Ù tôm: win with the tôm special meld
7. Ù lèo: win with the lèo special meld
8. Ù xuyên bí tư: hand with two pairs of the same number, waiting for the remaining card of the same number to win
9. Ù xuyên năm gian: hand with two unfinished runs (run with just two cards), waiting for the only card to fall into a run of five cards to win
10. Ù thập điều: win with ten red cards
11. Ù bạch định: win without any red cards
12. Ù chi nảy: only waiting for the Half Cash card to win
13. Ù kính cụ: win with all white cards and the Old Man card (which is the only red)
14. Ù kính tứ cố: win with all white cards and four Old Man cards
15. Ù vọng: win with someone else's dậy thiên khai

=== Arranging cards ===
When playing tổ tôm, there are rules for placing them on the mat to make it easier to check the score. Three-of-a-kinds should be placed on top. Runs should be placed below and placed vertically. If there is a "thiên khai," it should be presented. If there is a "khàn," it should be placed face down and when there is an "ù," it must be turned over.

=== Scoring ===
Many games of tổ tôm are normally played, where each game is scored and then added up. The scoring varies from place to place but is usually based on the saying:

"suông hai, dịch một, tôm bốn, lèo năm, bội tam, bội tứ, bội lục, kính tứ cố bằng hai lần chi nảy"

== Variants ==
=== Tổ tôm bí tứ ===
Four-player tổ tôm.

=== Tổ tôm điếm ===
The winning hand is composed of different special melds and different runs.

Lưng:

1. Thiên khai: four identical cards
2. Khàn: three identical cards, when another card comes out, it becomes a khàn like the "chíu" in "đánh chắn"
3. Phỗng: two identical cards, with the third identical card taken from another player
4. the following triples:
  - 1 Myriad, 1 String, 9 Cash
  - Zero String, Old Man, 9 String
  - 9 Myriad, 9 String, Zero String
  - 3 Myriad, 3 String, 7 Cash
  - 9 Myriad, 8 String, Half Cash
  - 2 Myriad, 2 String, 8 Cash
  - 1 Cash, 2 Cash, 3 Cash

Phu bí:

1. Bí tam – like from tá lả, for example:
  - 4 Cash, 4 Myriad, 4 String
  - 4 Cash, 5 Cash, 6 Cash
1. Similarly, there are bí tứ (four-card runs), bí ngũ (five-card runs), etc.

== Other Games using same deck ==
=== Tài bàn ===
Tài bàn is a three player game that plays like tổ tôm. However, in tài bàn, there are not as many restrictions on how to eat or how to play (like eating one card and playing two cards is allowed or playing melds under the mat, etc.). A winning hand in tài bàn must have at least nine special melds, and depending on whether the melds have three identical cards or not, it is converted into points. In tài bàn, there are only three winning hands: "ù xuông," "ù tài bàn," and "ù sửu bàn."

In tài bàn, some cards are called "tài":

- Nhị: 9 Cash
- Tứ: 7 String
- Ngũ: 8 Myriad

These cards, along with the red-marked cards, have a "phỗng" with two "lưng," a "khàn" with six "lưng," and a "chiếu" or "thiên khai" with twelve "lưng." The remaining cards have a "phỗng" with one "lưng," a "khàn" with three "lưng," and a "chiếu" or "thiên khai" with six "lưng." In addition, the "phu" count as one "lưng" like in tổ tôm such as 2 Myriad, 2 String, 8 Cash, Zero String, Old Man, 9 String, etc.

- In tài bàn, there is no "tôm" or "lèo" special melds
- "Ù tài bàn" is a winning hand with 19 or more special melds
- "Ù sửu bàn" is a winning hand without any three identical cards

Usually, the score for "ù sửu bàn" is bigger than the score for "ù tài bàn."

- In the remaining cases, the winning hands are the smallest.

How to calculate the score depends on the players.

Therefore, playing tài bàn is an introductory way to learn before playing tổ tôm.

=== Đánh chắn ===
See Bài chắn.

== In literature ==
Because tổ tôm is quite difficult, the ancients had a folk song praising tổ tôm, it shows the level and majesty of a gentleman:

Làm trai biết đánh Tổ tôm
Uống chè mạn hảo xem Nôm Thúy Kiều

Poet Nguyễn Khuyến mentioned tổ tôm in his poem "Tự trào":

...Mở miệng nói ra gàn bát Sách
Mềm môi chén mãi tít cung Thang
Nghĩ mình lại gớm cho mình nhỉ
Thế cũng bia xanh cũng bảng vàng

Poet Trần Tế Xương also mentioned this game in the poem "Chơi cuộc Tổ tôm":

Bực chăng nhẽ anh hùng khi vị ngộ
Như lúc đen chơi cuộc Tổ tôm

Poet Nguyễn Công Trứ wrote a whole poem, each verse has the name of a card in tổ tôm, according to legend, to ask for forgiveness from debt:

Thân "bát văn" tôi đã xác vờ.
Trong nhà còn biết "bán chi" giờ?
Của trời cũng muốn "không thang" bắc,
Lộc thánh còn mong "lục sách" chờ.
Thiên tử "nhất văn" rồi chẳng thiếu.
Nhân sinh "tam vạn" hãy còn thừa.
Đã không "nhất sách" kêu chi nữa?
"Ông lão" tha cho cũng được nhờ!

In the work "Sống chết mặc bay" by Phạm Duy Tốn, there is also a detail mentioned: "Ấy đó, quan phụ mẫu cùng với nha lại, đương vui cuộc tổ tôm ở trong đình ấy, ngài mà còn dở ván bài thì dẫu trời long đất lở, đê vỡ, dân trôi, ngài cũng thây kệ."

== Bibliography ==
- Nguyễn Văn Vĩnh (†), “Le tổ-tôm, jeu de cartes annamite”, Bulletin de la Société des études indochinoises, n.s., vol. XXVIII, no. 4 (1953), pp. 309–362.
- Michael Dummett, “A Vietnamese card game”, Ludica, annali di storia e civiltà del giuoco, Vol. 2 (1996), pp. 255–261.

== See also ==
- Bài Chòi
- Bài Tứ Sắc
- Bài Tam Cúc
- Mahjong
