= Tam cúc =

Vietnamese card game

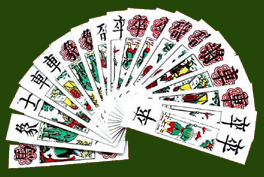
- Tam cúc deck
- Origin: Vietnamese
- Type: Partitioning Comparison
- Players: 2-4
- Age range: 13+
- Cards: 32 (30 or 27 for 3 players)
- Deck: 2 Color Chinese chess cards set
- Rank (high→low): 將 士 象 車 砲 馬 卒
- Play: Anticlockwise

Related games
- Cart-Horse-Cannon (Chēmǎbāo 車馬包) from Fujian • Throw the Tiger (Zhìhǔ 擲虎) from Taiwan • Noble (Giog 爵) from Malaysia

Tam cúc (三菊, "three chrysanthemums") is a multi-trick card game popular in Northern Vietnam. Tam Cúc is not just played for entertainment, but also played in ceremonies and festivals. It is commonly played during New Year celebrations, while waiting for bánh chưng to cook. It is similar to the games of Cart-Horse-Cannon (Chēmǎbāo 車馬包) from Fujian, Throw the Tiger (Zhìhǔ 擲虎) from Taiwan, and Noble (Giog 爵) from Malaysia.

== Card set ==
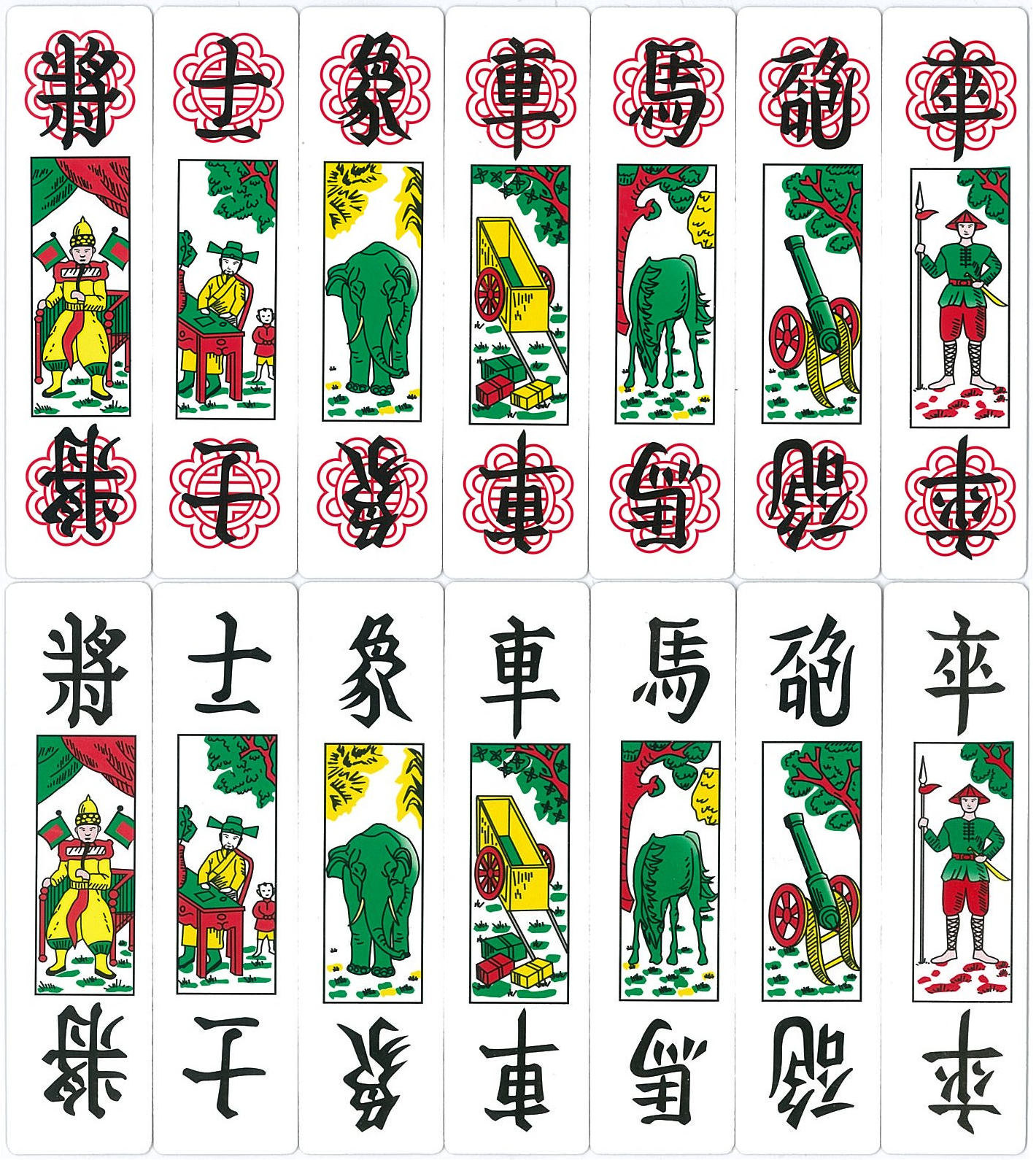
The seven ranks of tam cúc cards (General, Major, Elephant, Cart, Horse, Cannon, and Soldier), in red and black suits

Tam cúc uses a deck of 32 Chinese chess cards divided into two suits: red and black. Each suit is divided into seven ranks: 1 general (tướng 將), 2 majors (sĩ 士), 2 elephants (tượng 象), 2 carts (xe 車), 2 cannons (pháo 砲), 2 horses (mã 馬), and 5 soldiers (tốt 卒). The black suit's general is called female general (tướng bà 將), and the red suit's general is called male general (tướng ông 將). The red suit's majors are called scholars (sĩ điều 士). The rest of the cards are addressed by their name and color. The ranks on each card are written in Chữ Hán (Chinese characters). Notably, the ranks are written the same as the black-side pieces of Cờ tướng for both red and black suits.

== Rules ==
=== Setting ===
The Tam Cúc deck is divided from high to low in rank. The General is the highest rank, followed by Major, Elephant, Cart, Cannon, Horse and Soldier. Note that, unlike Chēmǎbāo, the Cannon is ranked higher than the Horse. A card in the red suit is ranked higher than a black card of the same rank.

Combinations of cards are:

Pair
Same color and same rank, e.g. pair of red Cannons, or pair of black Majors.
Three-card combo
The cards General + Major + Elephant; or Cart + Cannon + Horse of the same color. Other combinations (such as Major + Elephant + Cart; or Elephant + Cart + Cannon) are not valid three-card combos.
Four sons
4 Soldier cards of the same color.
Five sons
5 Soldier cards of the same color.

=== How to play ===
The objective is to win the most rounds or to collect the most cards for a predetermined number of games.

Tam Cúc can be played with two to four players. When played with three players, one red soldier and one black soldier will not be used, forming a 30-card deck. Alternatively, five cards can be discarded to form a 27-card deck: the two generals, one red major, one red soldier, and one black soldier. In some versions of the game, when playing with only two players, the same number of cards are left out as for three-player game. The deck is dealt as if three people are playing, but one pile remains face down for the duration of the game. Other versions of two-player games deal 16 cards to each player.

To begin, one person will shuffle the cards, and another will be designated to play as the House (Nhà Cái), i.e. the leader for the round. There are many ways to designate the House player: the oldest, the most experienced, the highest-ranked drawn, etc. One way to become the House is for players to call out the name of the card as they are dealt. The first player to get the card they called will become the House. For following rounds, the House will be established by the next person sitting to the right. Alternatively, the next House player could be the winner or loser of the previous round.

The House for the current round shuffles and deals out all the cards evenly to each player. The House will lay their cards face-down first and call out the number of cards that they played: a single card, two cards, or three cards. The following players will lay face-down the same number of cards. After all players have placed their cards, the House will reveal their hand by flipping their placed cards face-up. Each player may reveal their hand to challenge the current round, or accept defeat by throwing away their placed cards face-down into a discard pile. Accepting defeat allows players to keep their cards hidden and thus keep secret the remaining cards in play. The player who revealed the highest-ranked hand will win the current round and collect their played cards in a separate pile as points while the other players discard their played cards. The House player for the next round is determined and rounds repeat until all cards have been played.

=== Special cases ===
If a player has four or five soldiers of the same color (four sons or five sons), they show their hand in the first round, win, and become the House. All other players must discard the same number of cards as was played. This is considered the first round of play; therefore, all suites can be played after this.

When the last round is played, if the House calls a black soldier pair "kết đôi" (the lowest combination possible) or three black soldiers "kết ba" and if the hand is won, more points will be added to the player for making the most out of the lowest-ranked cards. In some versions, the penalty is two points from each of the other players. However, if another player has two or three red soldiers on the last round, it is a "để"; they win and receive 6 points from the player who played the black soldiers.

In some areas, the players may exchange some of their cards in secret face-down to make better their hands. This is called "night walker" (đi đêm).

== Tam Cúc in literature ==
Tam Cúc is a common game among the people. It has become a trademark for New Years and other large festivals or celebrations, so many famous Vietnamese poets and writers had talked about this game in their work. The famous poet Hoàng Cầm wrote in his poem “Cây Tam Cúc”:

...Tướng sĩ đỏ đen chui sấp ngửa
Ổ rơm thơm đọng tuổi đương thì...

...Em đi đêm tướng điều sĩ đỏ
Đổi xe hồng đưa Chị đến quê Em...

...Thả tịnh vàng cưới Chị võng mây trôi
Em đứng nhìn theo Em gọi đôi.

The famous poet Hồ Dzếnh described the Tam Cúc deck:

"...Từ đó mỗi mùa đào nở
Pháo xe lại rộn cây bài
Có độ anh về, có độ
Vắng anh, em nhớ mong hoài..."

Poet Trần Đăng Khoa in a poem about playing Tam Cúc:

"Đây là tướng ông
Chân đi hài đỏ
Đây là tướng bà
Tóc hiu hiu gió
Đây là con ngựa
Chân có bụi đường"

== See also ==
- Bài Chòi
- Bài Bất / Bài Tổ Tôm
- Bài Tứ Sắc
- Mahjong
