= Deuce (playing card) =

High card in German card games

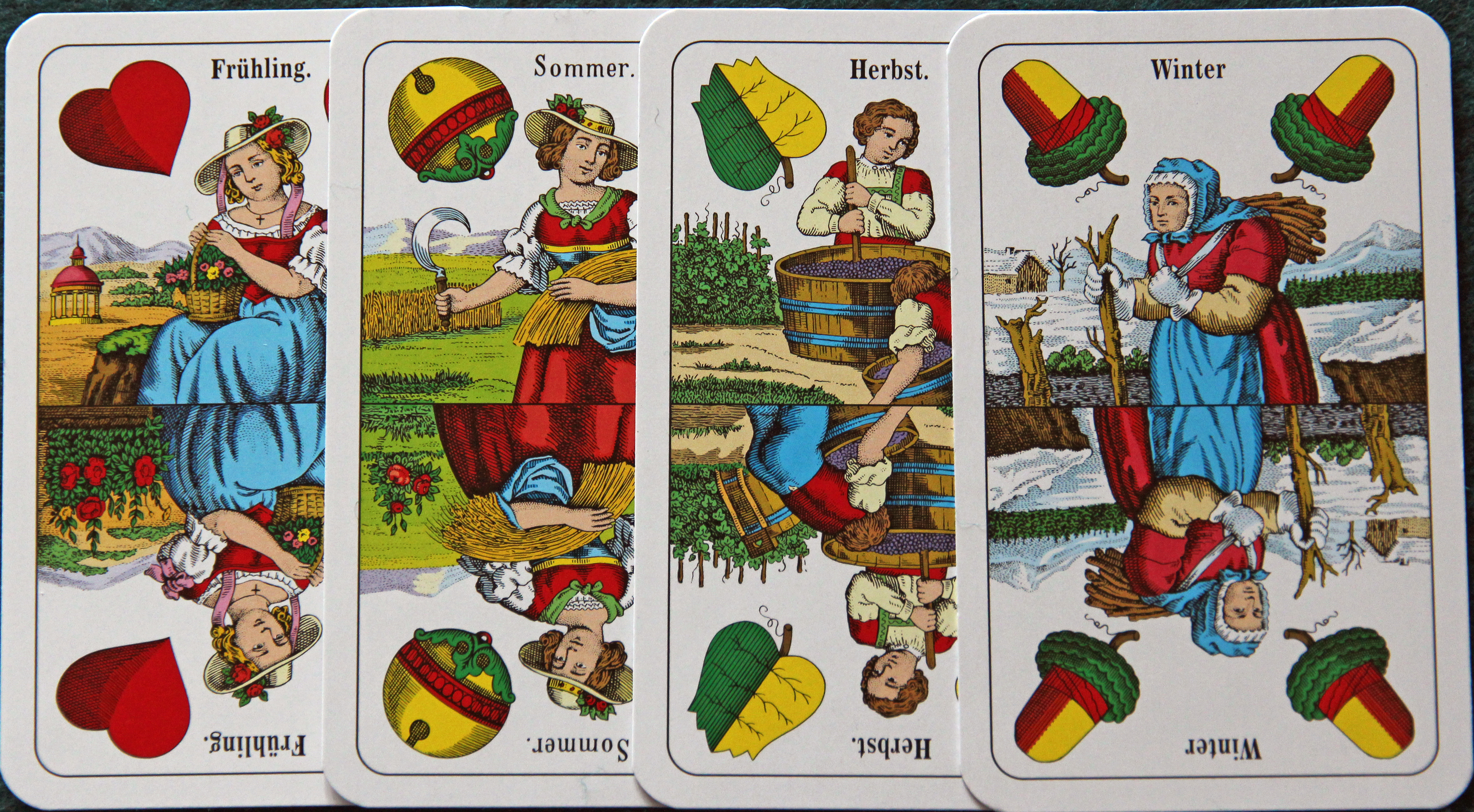
The four deuces from a William Tell pack

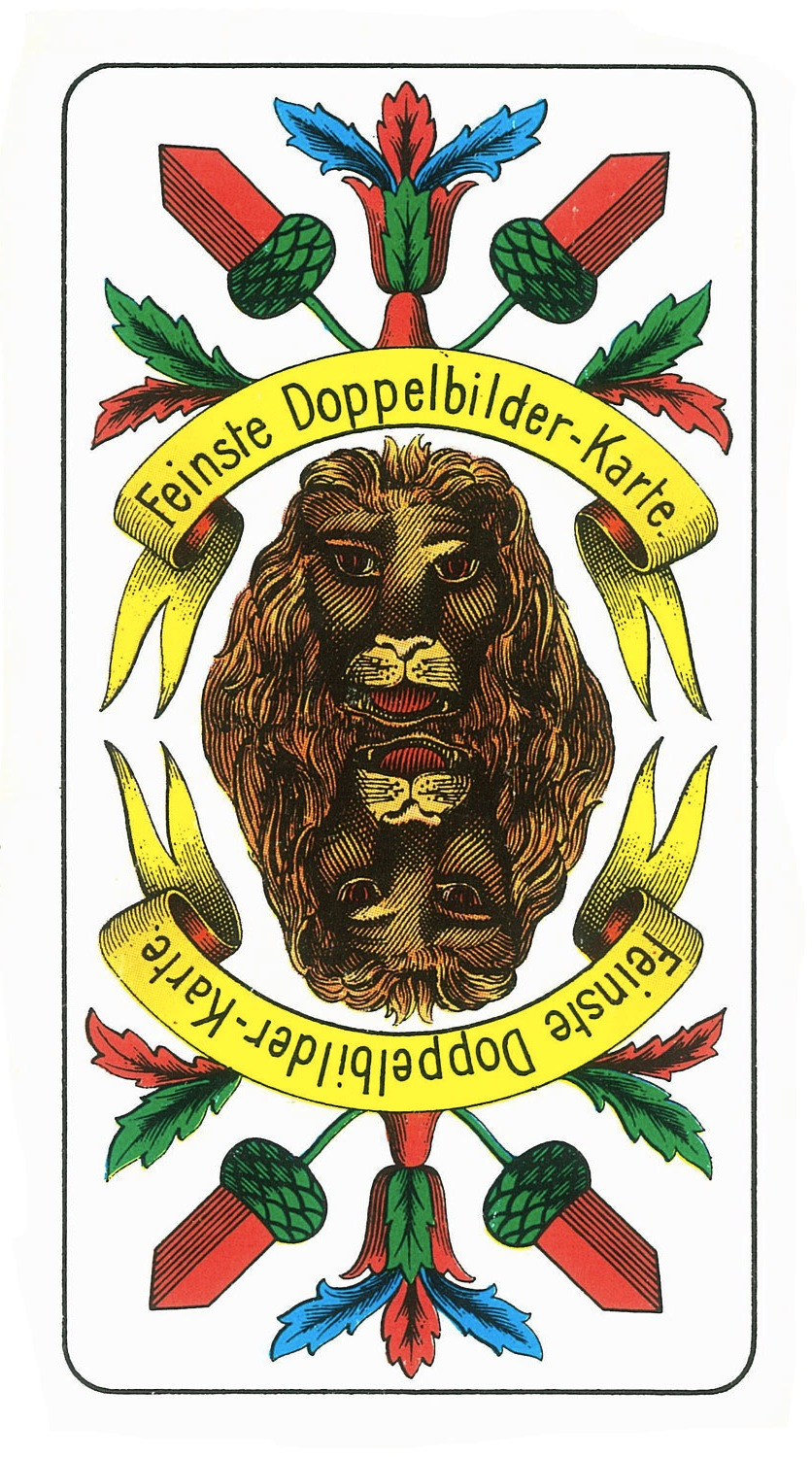
Deuce of Acorns

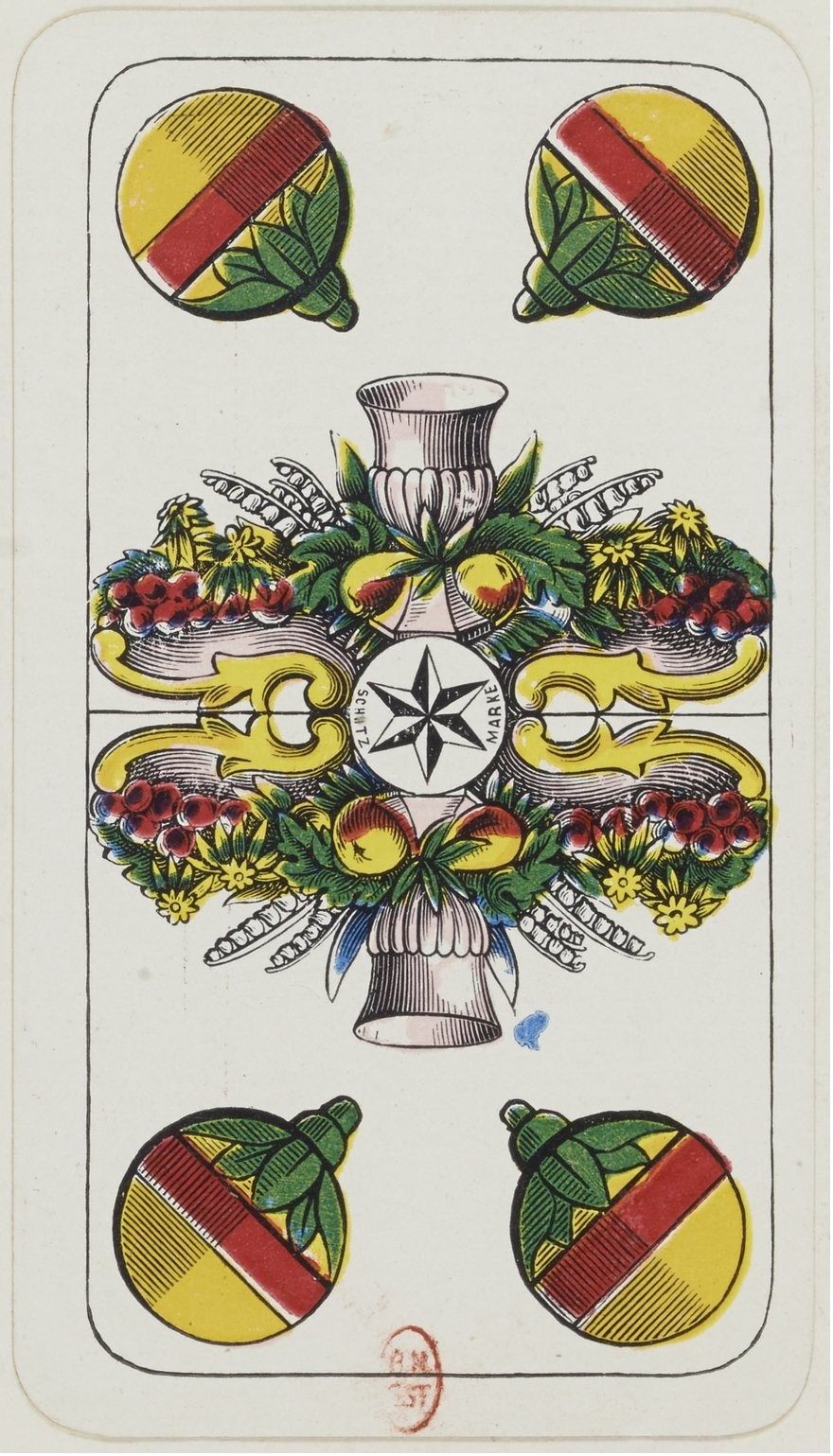
Württemberg pattern deck: deuce of bells

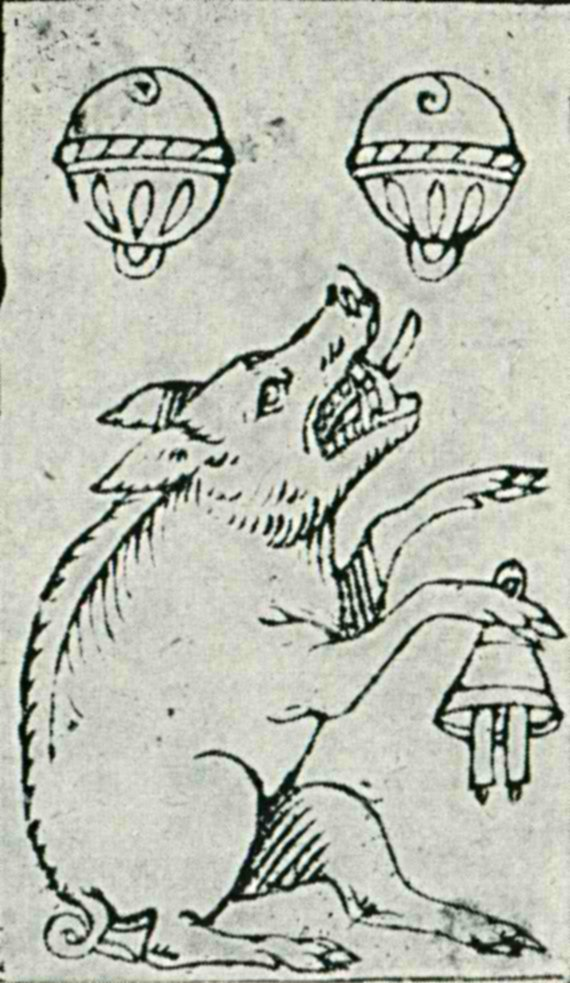
Deuce of bells playing card depicting a wild boar sow (1573)

The deuce (German: Daus, plural: Däuser) is the playing card with the highest value in German card games. It may have derived its name from dice games in which the face of the die with two pips is also called a Daus in German.

Unlike the ace, with which it may be confused, the deuce represents the 2, which is why two hearts, bells, etc. are depicted on the card. In many regions it is not only equated to the ace, but is also, incorrectly, called an ace. In the south German area it has been historically called the sow (Sau) and still is today, because of the appearance of a wild boar on the deuces in early card packs, a custom that has survived on the deuce of bells.

Ei der Daus! (also: Was der Daus!) is an expression, similar, to "What the deuce!" in English, which reflects astonishment, bewilderment or even anger. It is commonly, if wrongly, assumed to be an expression derived from card players' jargon.

In some games outside Germany, the Deuce may rank higher than the Ace, such as in Big two, Tiến lên, and President (card game). These games share a common ancestor, the Chinese game of Zheng Shangyou. This ranking system may be influenced by Chinese numerology, where the two is seen as an auspicious number.

== Comparison of German and French suits ==
German playing cards					Deuce (German: Daus)
French playing cards	♣	♠	♥	♦	Ace (German: Ass, French: as)

== Origin and history ==
The word Daus as a description of the two pips on a die has been in use since the 12th century. It comes from the Late Old High German, later Middle High German word, dûs, which was borrowed from the North French word, daus. This corresponds to the French word for "two", deux, which in turn came from the Latin duos and duo. On the introduction of playing cards into the German language area at the end of the 14th century, the word was also transferred to the cards with the value 2. This card became the highest value playing card in the German card deck, the equivalent of the Ace in the French deck. Dummett (1980) assesses that this had happened by the 1470s because the Ace, originally the lowest card of each suit, had disappeared from German-suited packs by then and that, subsequently, under the influence of foreign card games, there was a need to promote another card in its place.

On the German playing card with the 2, the deuce, there is often a picture of a hog or sow. While Friedrich Kluge is unsure, how the card came to be called the Daus, because he avers that there are no game rules that have survived from the Middle Ages, Marianne Rumpf is clear: The word 'Daus' is a term that has been taken over from the dice game. However, unlike dice games, in which the 2 was a low throw and did not count for much, the deuce card played a special role as a trick card, because it could even beat the King. The Early New High German author, Johann Fischart, says thus: "I have thrown out the Ace, Sow and Deuce of Bells, Clubs, Hearts respectively; but now I hold the Sow of Acorns which now reigns". The name Schwein ("hog") was also used for the deuce as may be read in the Reimchronik über Herzog Ulrich von Württemberg ("Rhyming Chronicle About Duke Ulrich of Wurttemberg"), which also reveals that the deuce, like the ace in the modern game of Skat, was worth 11 points: "The King ought to beat all the cards. That is apart from the Hog. It wants then to be worth 11."

Early evidence of the depiction of a hog on the card is found as early as the 15th century, from which deuces of bells and acorns have survived on which there is a wild boar. Decks with a hog or sow on the card along with the 2 of bells have also survived from the year 1525 in the Swiss National Museum in Zürich and in a deck dating to 1573 made by the Viennese artist, Hans Forster. There is also a deck of cards by a Frankfurt manufacturer dating to 1573, on which the hog is found on a 2 of hearts. The link between the deuce and the sow is evinced by Johann Leonhard Frisch in his 1741 German–Latin dictionary: "Sow in card game, from the figure of a sow, which is painted on the Deuce of Acorns, whence the other deuces are also called Sows."

How the boar ended up on the playing card is unknown. Hellmut Rosenfeld suspects that it was derived from the prize sow that played a role in local shooting festivals (Schützenfesten) and which was linked with the last sheaf of the harvest. The description Sau may have been a corruption of the word Daus, and the depiction of a boar on the playing cards was simply a pictorial illustration of this etymological development.

According to Marianne Rumpf, the name comes from a Baden dialect in which the "S" is spoken like a "Sch" and the word Dausch is used for a female pig or sow.

[One] can ... with a little imagination, picture that the players, in the excitement of the game when playing the trump card ... loudly emphasize their triumph by saying the name of the card.

The Brothers Grimm state in their dictionary, that the word Tausch ("Swap") was used for the four cards. Perhaps the word Dausch inspired card artists who illustrated the free space under the coloured symbols with a sow.

The language of card players may also have given rise to the expression Däuser (also Deuser) for 'coins', recorded since the 19th century, because in a game played for money, the aces are worth cash. Quite similar is the saying Däuser bauen Häuser ("deuces build houses"), which has been used since 1850, because with a trick with several aces, one quickly scores the points needed to win.

== In Unicode ==
The deuces are included in the Playing Cards:

- U+1F0A2 🂢 PLAYING CARD TWO OF SPADES
- U+1F0B2 🂲 PLAYING CARD TWO OF HEARTS
- U+1F0C2 🃂 PLAYING CARD TWO OF DIAMONDS
- U+1F0D2 🃒 PLAYING CARD TWO OF CLUBS

== See also ==
- Pip cards
- Skat deck

== Literature ==
- Marianne Rumpf: Zur Entwicklung der playing cardsnfarben in der Schweiz, in Deutschland und in Frankreich. In: „Schweizerisches Archiv für Volkskunde“ 72, 1976, pp. 1–32 (for Daus, see pp. 11–14)
- Dummett, Sir Michael (1980). The Game of Tarot. London: Duckworth. ISBN 0-7156-1014-7
