= Tichu =

Card game

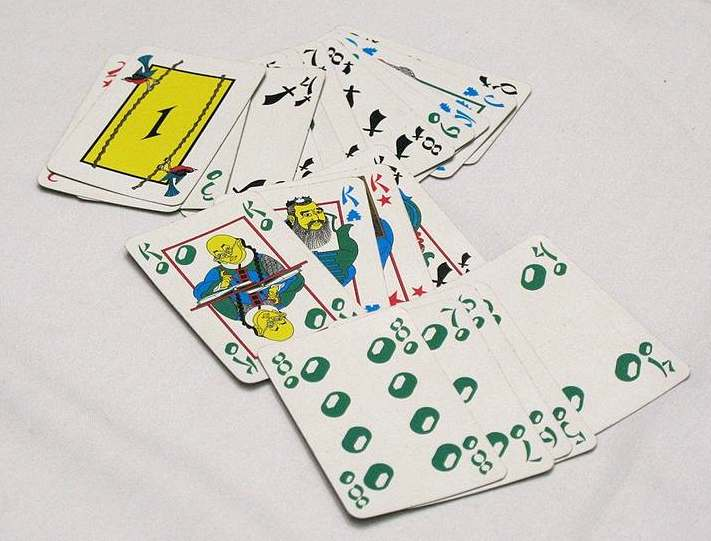
- Tichu cards
- Other names: Tai Pan
- Genres: Strategy card game
- Players: 4
- Playing time: 60-90 minutes
- Materials required: Tichu card set

Tichu is a proprietary card game primarily classified as a shedding game that includes elements of Bridge, Daihinmin, and Poker played between two teams of two players each. Teams work to accumulate points, and the first team to reach a predetermined score (usually 1,000 points) is the winner. Tichu is the trade name for what appears to be a variant of Dou di zhu, Choi Dai Di (Cantonese) or Da Lao Er (Mandarin), meaning "big two", combined with Zheng Fen ("Competing for Points"). It is also marketed as Tai Pan in Dutch. Tichu was invented by Urs Hostettler and originally released in 1991.

== Rules ==
The following covers the basics. However, for more comprehensive rule sets, consult the links below.

Each player sits across from their teammate so that play alternates between the two teams. The game is traditionally run anticlockwise, but is frequently played clockwise.

The game is played with a deck of 56 cards, consisting of a 52-card deck of four suits (Jade, Sword, Pagoda, Star) plus four special cards (Mah Jong, Dog, Phoenix, Dragon). A standard 52-card deck with 4 jokers (marked to indicate the special cards) can also be used.

Each player is dealt (or alternately draws, in Chinese play) eight cards, and may call "Grand Tichu," a 200-point bet that they (not their partner) will be the first to get rid of their cards. Once players have decided whether to make this call, six more cards are dealt (the remaining cards in the deck) and players may no longer declare "Grand Tichu." Now, and at any time prior to playing their first card, a player may call "Tichu", a 100-point bet that they (not their partner) will be the first to get rid of their cards. The differences between Grand Tichu and Tichu are when they may be called, the number of cards you've seen, and the number of points involved.

All players prepare three cards for simultaneous exchange, with each player passing one card (face down) to each of the other players—one to each opponent and one to the partner. Should a player declare "Tichu" before the simultaneous exchange, players are allowed to change their out-going exchange cards.

After the card exchange, the player with the Mah Jong leads the first trick. In Tichu, playable card combinations are generally based on Poker hands, with some exceptions. A player may pass on a trick with the option to play in later (essentially checking in Poker), and a trick is completed if it is passed three times in a row.

Playable card combinations include: a single card; any pair; two or more "stairs" (consecutive pairs; for example, 55667788. Non-consecutive pairs may not be played); three of a kind; straights of at least five cards in length, regardless of suit/color (so 56789TJQ is playable); and full houses (three of a kind & a pair). Four of a kind or a straight flush of at least five cards is a bomb which beats any card combination with the exception of a bigger bomb. Bombs may be played at any time (even out of turn) to end a trick, with every player given a chance to play bigger bombs before the trick is taken.

An example of "bombing": 10< K< D< 8888< AAAA< ♦9♦10♦J♦Q♦K< ♠2♠3♠4♠5♠6♠7.

With the exception of "bombing", cards can only be followed by a similar combination of higher value; like a single card on a single card, a pair on a pair etc.

The special cards affect gameplay accordingly:

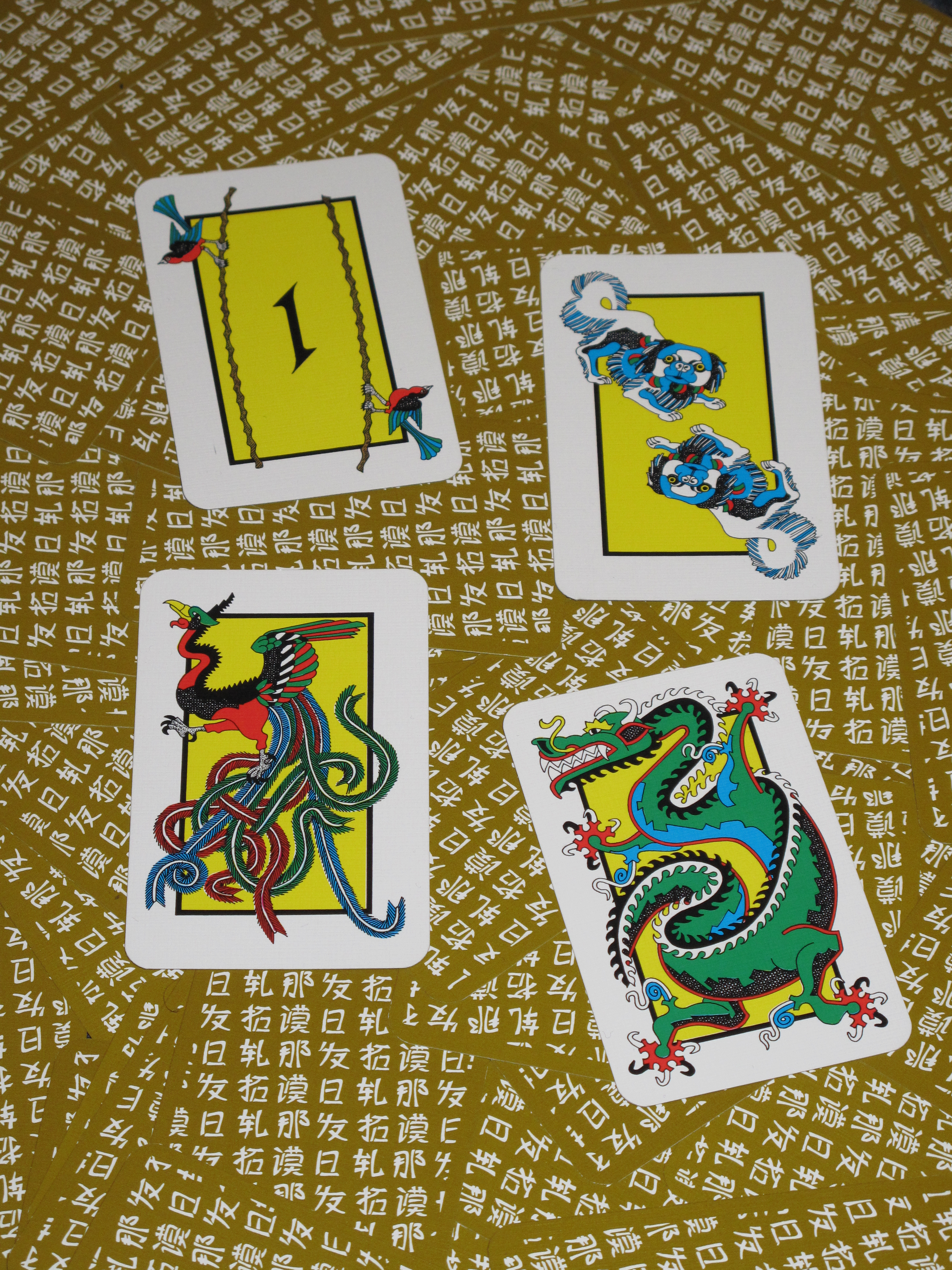
Mah Jong, Dog, Phoenix, Dragon

- The Mah Jong The player with the Mah Jong leads the opening trick, but is not required to play Mah Jong in the trick. The Mah Jong may be played as a 1, either by itself or in a MJ2345+ straight. When the Mah Jong is played, you may make a Wish (request a card number 2-A). The wish remains active until it is fulfilled. Each player who can fulfill the Wished card must play it, if possible, until it is played once—if the wished card requires you playing four of them as a Bomb (i.e. to beat the straight, above), you must. If the Mah Jong opens a trick as a straight, the next player must play a straight containing the wished value, if possible. If a straight can only be constructed with the Phoenix (as wild card, not the wished value), you must play it. Remember: if you can, you must. The Mah Jong is sometimes also referred to as the Sparrow.
- The Dog has no numeric value, and cannot be played in a trick. The Dog must be played as the lead card, and passes the lead to your partner. If your partner is out, play passes to the active player after your partner's position. It is not possible to steal the lead in any way, as such, bombing the dog is not allowed.
- The Phoenix may be played alone as .5 higher than the previous card played (i.e. after A, Phoenix is played as A.5), or as a wild card in a combination (with a value from 2-A). The declared value of a Phoenix in a straight doesn't satisfy the Mah Jong's wish, above. The Phoenix cannot be included as a wild card in a bomb, is not a wild card as a single play, has only a value of 1.5 when played as lead, and it doesn't count as .5 higher when used in a straight. The Phoenix is sometimes also referred to as the Nexus.
- The Dragon is the strongest card and may only be played in a single card trick. The player wins the trick, unless the Dragon is bombed. If the trick is won with the Dragon, the trick is given to your opponent (you choose which one). Furthermore, if the dragon is bombed, the player who played the largest bomb on the trick takes the entire trick for themselves (which includes the dragon). Furthermore, it is impossible to use the dragon in order to win the dog.

== Scoring ==
Teams gain or deduct points for Grand Tichu (±200 points) and/or Tichu (±100 points) calls. As an example: player A declared Grand Tichu and lost to D's Tichu. A&C lose 200 points and B&D gain 100 points.

If both players on a team get rid of all their cards before either player on the opposing team is out of cards, the winning team scores 200 points and there is no card scoring this round.

The last player out gives their remaining cards to the opposing team, and gives all the tricks they have won this round to the first player who went out.

Points are scored based on the cards in the tricks won by each team. Kings and tens are worth ten points each, fives are worth five points, the Dragon is worth 25 points, and the Phoenix is worth negative 25. All other cards score zero.

Rounds continue until a team scores 1,000 points or more.

== Three player game (or Threechu) ==
The cards are dealt the same way as normal. The dealer forms a team with a dummy and the other two players are a "normal" team and do nothing different. The dealer controls his own cards and of the dummy. He may not declare a Grand Tichu, only a small one. The exchange in cards is normal, only the dealer and dummy do not give each other a card. After this, the cards of the dummy must lay face-up on the table. After the round, another player plays with dummy, because playing with dummy has a slight advantage. Scoring is done individually. Usually, a number of rounds is played that is a multiple of three, so each player plays with the dummy an equal number of times. The dummy can declare tichu as well and also isn't obliged to fulfil the wish of Mah Jong.

== Tientsin (6 players) ==
In Tientsin (Tianjin) tichu is played six-handed, two teams of three seated alternating round the table. The rules of the game are the same as for the four-handed version, except that:

- grand tichu must be announced before the seventh card is taken
- each player pushes only two cards, one to each of his partners, and gets one card back from each of them.
- the hound transfers the right to lead to its holder’s choice of partner.
- in the scoring, the last loses not only his remaining cards but also all his tricks to the opposition; the fifth (the last but one to go out) gives his tricks up to the winner of the round.

There is no special reward for a double victory, but a triple victory (one team gets rid of all its cards while all three opponents still hold cards) scores 300 points.

== Grand Seigneur (5–12 players) ==
The seating order is the Alpha and Omega of Grand Seigneur, which is very similar to President or Daifugō. At the head of the table, in the most comfortable armchair in the house, sits the Great Lord himself. On his left is the number two in the hierarchy, the Lord. Further to the left, in third place, sits the Squire. In fourth place the Burgher. Number five is the Pauper. In last place - so at the right of the Great Lord - sits the Wretch on a simple kitchen stool.

The number of places corresponds to the number taking part. If need be, obscure forms such as Grand Burgher or Petty Pauper can be added in. Women may use the corresponding forms, such as Wretch (f).

The first round is a simple round of Tichu, without any pushing of cards or any point values, in which everyone tries to get rid of his cards as quickly as possible - to be elected as the first Great Lord of the day. Whoever gets rid of his cards second becomes the first Lord and so on. The players then move into the seats to which they are entitled.

The social injustice of the game of Grand Seigneur appears in the pushing in the second round.

- the Wretch pushes his best three cards to the Great Lord (including special cards, which rank Dragon, Phoenix, Mah Jong.)
- the Pauper gives the Lord his two best
- the Burgher gives the Squire his best.

If five play one card less is handed over at each level. The recipients simultaneously push the corresponding number of cards back - but useless cards of their choice.

The Mah Jong begins, the uneven contest takes its course and the winner becomes Great Lord, the tailender becomes the Wretch. The players take their new-won places - provided that any positions have changed. Great Lords are hard to overthrow due to the uneven card exchange.

There is no defined end to the game, only the glory of being Grand Lord. It is all for fun. The use of two packs is recommended when 7 or more play Grand Seigneur. The Hound and Mah Jong must be removed from the second pack. Extra rules:

- the second Dragon played beats the first
- only four cards of equal rank in different suits count as a 4-bomb.
