= Daifugō =

Japanese card game

- Grand Millionaire, Grand Pauper
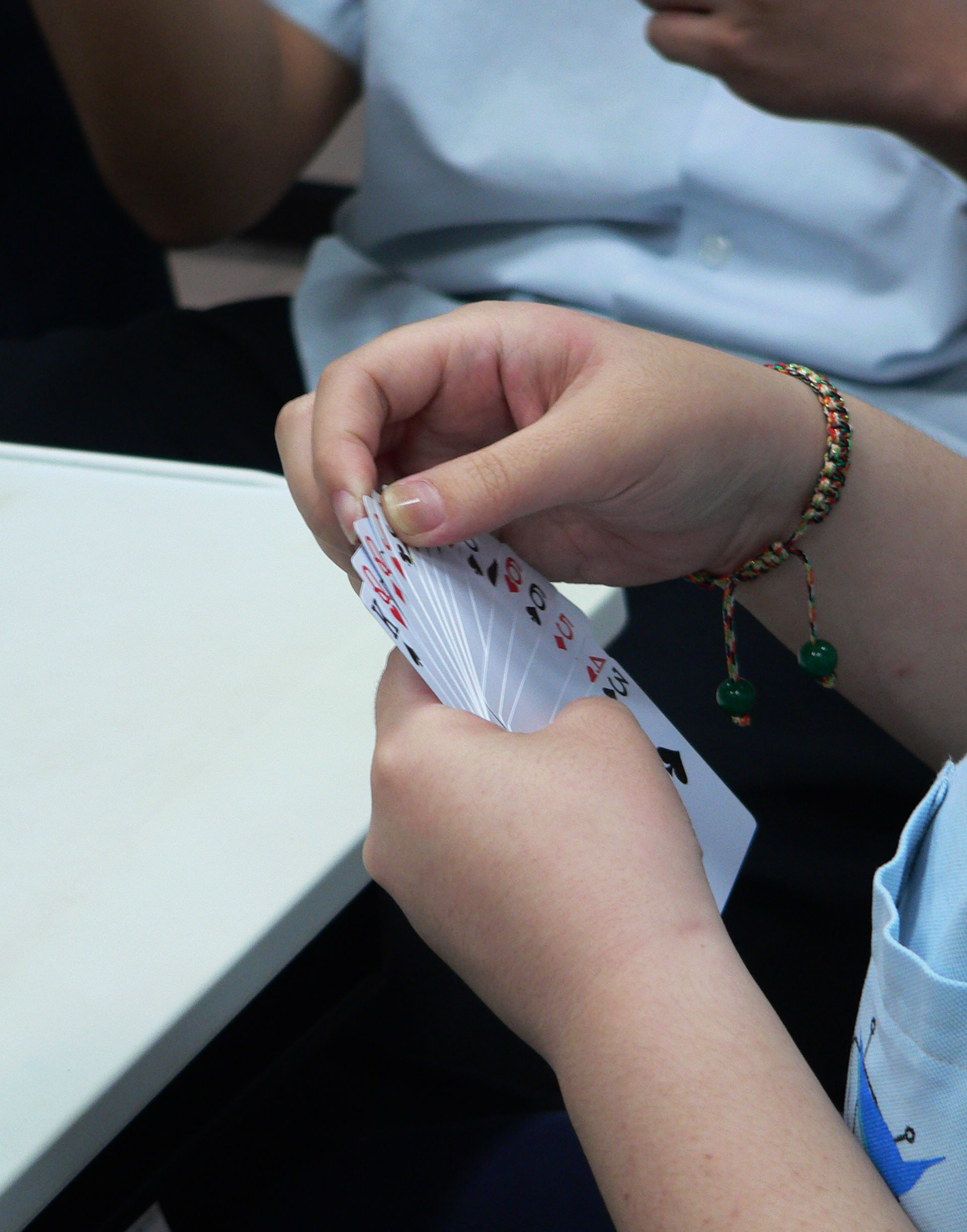
- The deck is dealt between all players
- Alternative names: Daihinmin
- Type: Shedding game
- Players: 3–8
- Cards: 52 or 53
- Deck: French
- Rank (high→low): Joker, 2, A, K, Q, J, 10, 9, 8, 7, 6, 5, 4, 3
- Play: Clockwise

Daifugō (大富豪, Grand Millionaire, Very Rich Man), Daihinmin (大貧民, Grand Pauper), Fool, or Tycoon, is a Japanese shedding-type card game for three or more players, played with a standard 52-card pack. The objective of the game is to get rid of all the cards one has as fast as possible by playing progressively stronger cards than those of the previous player. The winner is called the daifugō (the grand millionaire), earning various advantages in the next round, and the last person is called the daihinmin (the grand pauper). In the following round, winners can exchange one or more of their unnecessary cards for advantageous ones that losers have.

The game is very similar to the Hong Kong climbing card game Big Two, the Chinese game Zheng Shangyou, the Vietnamese game Tien Len, and Western card games like President and The Great Dalmuti. Like those other games, there are many variations and rules.

== Basic rules ==
The rules described here are based on rules made popular in the U.S. by Tokyopop, in volume two of the manga Fruits Basket. They are fairly basic and attempt to condense the game to its core elements. Since card games like this are taught and evolve by word of mouth, the game play varies according to state of origin.

=== Special titles ===
There are five special titles for players during the game, along with popular North American and European equivalents:

- Daifugō (大富豪 "Grand Millionaire") - winner of the previous round (President / Tycoon)
- Fugō (富豪 "Millionaire") - second place in the previous round (Vice President / Rich)
- Heimin (平民 "Commoner") - average placement in the previous round (Neutral / Commoner)
- Hinmin (貧民 "Poor") - second-to-last in the previous round (Dirt / Poor)
- Daihinmin (大貧民 "Extremely Poor") - last place in the previous round (Lowest Dirt / Beggar)

Some notes:

- In the first round, all players begin as heimin. Decide randomly who will be the dealer.
- Depending on the number of players, multiple players could be heimin, or the game might not have a heimin. In a three player game, there is no fugō or hinmin.
- After every hand, players must get up and switch seats so that the daihinmin deals, and everyone is seated clockwise in order of titles, with daifugō on the dealer's left, and hinmin on the right. (American variants often do not follow this rule).

=== Dealing ===
The daihinmin shuffles and deals the cards. All the cards are dealt, until none are left, in clockwise rotation. Jokers, other wilds or extra 2s from another deck are used to ensure the cards can be dealt evenly. Alternately, the deal starts at the point which will allow the richest players to have the fewest cards (e.g. deal starts on the heimin for five players) and therefore be more likely to maintain their domination.

After cards are dealt and after the first hand, the daihinmin must hand over their two strongest cards to the daifugō, while the hinmin must hand over their one strongest card to the fugō. The daifugō and fugō then hand back an equal number of any "junk" cards they do not want. This process is known as zeikin (taxation).

=== Playing ===
Play in Daifugō is organized into tricks, much like Spades or Bridge. However, unlike those games, each trick can involve more than one card played by each player, and players do not have to play a card in a trick.

The player on the dealer's left begins by leading any number of cards of the same rank (1-4, 5 or more are possible with wilds). The player on the left may then play an equal number of matching cards with a higher face value, or may pass. (In a few variants, it is permitted to play cards with an equal value as the last cards played. Doing so may skip the player next in order.) Note that the same number of cards as the lead must be played. If the leader starts with a pair, only pairs may be played on top of it. If three-of-a-kind is led, only three-of-a-kinds can be played on top of it. (There are notable exceptions among the variants; see below) The next player may do the same, and so on. This continues until all players pass, or until one or more 2s are played; as the 2 is the highest value, nothing can beat it. The last person to play a card leads the next trick.

Notes on game play:

- The ordering of the face values is a little different from most American card games - the deuce (2) is the highest value and is unbeatable. The ace is next highest, the King the next highest, etc. with the 3 being the lowest. A few variants allow a single deuce to be played on top of any other combination, but typically games require the same number of deuces to be played as were originally led. Another variant leaves one-eyed jacks (jacks of hearts and spades) higher than the deuce; the one-eyed jacks can be bested by the suicide king (king of hearts).
- When players pass, this does not limit them in any way from playing later, even during the same trick. In some variants, however, a player cannot play on a trick in which he or she passed previously.
- Players can pass anytime, even if the player has cards that could be played.
- The number of cards that can be led to begin any trick is only dependent on the cards in the player's hand and his/her strategy.

=== End of a round ===
When one player runs out of cards, they are out of play for the rest of the round, but the other players can continue to play to figure out the titles. A few versions hold that once a player goes out, players count remaining card values to establish titles, or simply count the number of cards remaining in each player's hand.

When playing by traditional rules, once titles are decided, everyone needs to get up and move. The daihinmin is the dealer, and the players must rearrange themselves around the dealer so that they are seated in order of rank, clockwise. Most American variants do not rearrange the seating of the players, so everyone plays in the same order each hand (though the daifugō still leads the first trick).

=== Winning the game ===
The winner is usually the player who is daifugō at the end of the game, but a point system can also be used, where the fugō and daifugō earn 1 and 2 points, respectively, every round.

=== Basic strategy ===
The basic strategy of Daifugō is very simple; players attempt to get rid of weaker cards first so that only stronger cards are left in the players' hands near the end of a game. If a player is stuck with a low card, it will be very hard to get to play it and empty a hand. However, as winning a trick lets the player lead any card to start the next trick, one weak card can be kept to be played last.

However, when trying to prevent a player who is low on cards from emptying their hand, the player preceding him/her can elect to try to block the next player by playing a high value card or combination even if a lower value combination is available, and thus hopefully prevent the next player from playing as they are unable to top it. Additional elements of strategy can be introduced with optional rules (see below) such as skips and clears, which afford the other players more options in attempting to prevent play by a person about to empty their hand.

== Optional rules ==
One or more house rules are usually observed when playing a game of Daifugō. Here are a few examples:

Rule No. 420
If the losing player finishes his cards first, then the 1, 2, 3, 4 order is reversed to 4, 3, 2, 1.

Strict 52-card
Uneven card count in hands is allowed and the benefit (smaller hand) goes to the richest players. The deal generally starts with the richest heimin (or with the hinmin in a four-player game) and continues clockwise, that is, down the wealth rank. If there is a dummy hand (see below), it is always dealt last and therefore may change who gets the first dealt card. (If there are four players and a dummy hand, then the deal will start with the fugō so that the dummy hand and default daifugō hand both have one less card than the other hands dealt.)

Dummy Hand
At the outset of every round after the first, one more hand is dealt than the number of players at the table. This last hand, the "dummy" hand, is ignored unless the daifugō decides he wants to chance swapping his dealt hand with the dummy hand. The swap must occur before taxation. The daifugō may not look at the dummy hand before the optional swap, nor may he change his mind after the swap. The dummy hand is generally taken only if the daifugō feels the cards in his dealt hand are significantly below average.

Deuce Means Clear
In addition to deuces (2s) being the highest value, a single 2 beats any other combination of cards. Because it cannot be beaten, a deuce becomes a "clear" card that allows the holder to "steal" the lead play from someone who would otherwise have played first. This can be essential when attempting to keep a person who has few cards remaining from going out; playing a 2 on a pile of pairs and starting a new pile of three-of-a-kinds means a person with only two cards left is dead in the water. This is common in Western versions of the game including Asshole.

Match Means Clear
If a player can match the current active play, the trick is cleared. For instance, if a 7 is played, one can play a 7 on top of this to clear. Or, if two Kings are played, one can play two Kings to clear. This is sometimes known as the Grand Palace Rule.

Jokers are Wild
Can be played almost any time, as any value, but cannot beat a 2. When a joker is played by itself, it is assumed to be one higher than the card played before it; for instance, a joker played on top of a single 5 is effectively a 6. Jokers played in combination with at least one other card are the same value as the other card(s); a joker and a 7 is equivalent to a pair of 7s.

Jokers are 2s
Jokers always count as 2s, meaning the number of Deuces in the game is increased.

Jokers are Trumps
While jokers can be played at any time, they are considered, when played as just jokers, to be above a 2. Some variants will include a rule where one of the 3 cards are able to beat a Joker, but only a Joker.

Forbidden Last Card
Players are not allowed to go out on a specific card or combination of cards. Common examples include going out on a 2, a Joker, a pair, or an 8.

Skips
A player who plays the same number of cards of the same rank as the previous player skips the next person who would have played. For example, playing a 7 on top of another 7, or a pair of 4s on another pair of 4s, skips the next player. This variant is rare, though more common in American versions, and adds an extra element of strategy.

Multi-Skips
If a player has more than one of the card played previously, he may play more of that card than is required in the current trick. By doing so, play skips one extra person for each extra card played. For instance, if a single 4 is played and the next player has the other three 4s in the deck, he may play two of them and skip the next two people, or play all three and skip the next three people. If two 4s are played and the next player has a 4 and two wild cards, he may play all three cards and skip the next two people (two cards required to play and skip, plus one extra).

Revolution (革命, kakumei)
Playing four of a kind causes a revolution, which reverses the strength of cards for the rest of the round (or session), making 3 the highest and 2 the lowest. Counterrevolution (革命返し, kakumei-gaeshi or 反革命, han-kakumei) would restore the power. Revolution could also spark when a set of four or more sequential cards of the same suit is played such as 4-5-6-7 of spade (see kaidan below), or in a row by different players. The one who plays such sets can choose not to have a revolution. It could also make the titles of the players reversed. There even would happen counter-counterrevolution (革命返し返しkakumei-gaeshi-gaeshi or 反反革命 han-han-kakumei).

Completo, a.k.a. Completion
If a player has the cards to complete a set of four of the current card, he can play them at any time, even outside of his turn. This results in a "clear", after which the player who completed the set of four leads the next trick.

Jack-Back (or Eleven Back)
When “J” is put into play, the strength of the card is temporarily the same as when the revolution occurred until the field card is washed away. In the revolutionary state, there is a temporary absence of a revolution (“2” is the strongest, “3” is the weakest). It returns to the original when the field flows. In some variations, playing a Jack or some other combination including a Jack results in a temporary kakumei, which lasts only for the current trick. For example, if a player plays a single J on a 9, the next player can play a lower-ranked card, such as a 3, on the J. After the trick in which the Jack is played ends, previous card strengths are restored.

Kaidan (階段 "Sequence")
Three or more cards in sequence (ex. 5-6-7) may be played together (they do not necessarily have to be of the same suit), instead of playing a three-of-a-kind or four-of-a-kind. The highest card must be higher than the highest card of the set just played. Alternatively, sequences of 2 might be allowed, a same-suit restriction could be added (i.e., all cards must be of the same suit), or the lowest card might be required to be higher than the highest of the set just played. Often a five card limit is placed on these straights. Another variant allows 'double straights' where a player plays a pair of straights (ex. 5-5-6-6-7-7).

Eight Enders (Or Eight Stop) (8切り "8-cutting", チェンジカード 'change card')
Playing an 8, set of 8s, or straight ending or beginning with an 8, can end the trick immediately, though it must follow the pattern of play (ex. a pair of 8s following a pair of 5's played previously). The player who played the eight leads the next trick.

Deuces Wild, Jokers High
Deuces may be any value and any suit except they are not allowed to be a “Joker”. If the deuce is played as a deuce, then its value trumps anything 3 through K. A deuce played as a deuce may be used as the highest card in a Kaidan when following an ace (ex. Q-K-A-2). Jokers are not wild but will always trump anything including a deuce. Jokers may be played in pairs, but may not be played in a Kaidan.

Direction of Play
The daihinmin is required to shuffle and deal but, based on the direction of the deal, decides the direction of play. The daihinmin is the first to go after the shuffle and the round starts once the daihinmin places down his first cards. In this variation, individuals never change seats, so they are subject to who will play before and after them based on the daihinmin's strategy.

People's Revolution (下克上 gekokujō)
In this variation, if the daihinmin is the first to shed all of his cards, he will take the daifugō position in the next round, but the daifugō is immediately out of the current round and will become the daihinmin in the next round. In some variants, a "People's Revolution" ends the game immediately with all players swapping rank. Therefore, the fugō and hinmin would also trade places, and if the Despotism variant is used, the various heimin would trade rankings for card-passing purposes.

Bankrupt (都落ち miyako-ochi "Exile from the capital")
A variation of the People's Revolution, where if the daifugō does not win a hand, he is immediately out of the current round and will become the daihinmin in the next round. Unlike People's Revolution, anyone can beat the daifugō and force him to go Bankrupt.

Metropolitan Citizens First (都民ファースト Tomin Fāsuto)
Typically the first dealer of the game is daihinmin, but if he bankrupted on the last game, the hinmin will be the first dealer. It comes from "都落ち", the Japanese rule name of Bankrupt which means "exile from the metropolis". The player exiled from the metropolis would be deprived the right to be the "first" dealer as a citizen.

Multiple Decks
In multiple deck games, when more than one deck is used, there is generally no limit to the number of cards played in a Kaidan or in a multiple card of a kind hand (ex. in a two deck game, eight 10's may be played; more if there are wildcards). A rule of thumb for determining multiple decks is 1 deck for every four players. For example, a five-player game would utilize two decks.

Despotism
The number of cards traded between the upper and lower ranks strictly depends on the number of players. In a nine-player game, the daihinmin and daifugō will trade four cards. The next two opposing ranks will trade three cards; the next two will trade two cards, and the last two will trade one. With an odd number of players, such as nine, the person in the middle will not trade any cards. A variant sometimes seen in Western versions of the game is similar, but the middle pair or three players do not exchange cards: so, with 9 players, the daifugō and daihinmin will trade three cards, the fugō and hinmin will trade two, and the top and bottom heimin will trade one. Sometimes additional titles for heimin that trade cards are introduced.

Three of Clubs Start
The player with the three of clubs in his hand leads the first trick of the round by placing down that card. It may be played in combination with other cards per legal combinations. In multi-deck games, the first player to throw down a three of clubs (or legal combination thereof) starts.

Daifugō's Choice
A subtle rule where the daifugō, and no other rank, may choose to ask the daihinmin if the daihinmin has any card(s) of a specified rank. This request can happen only after traded cards are given to the daifugō, but the round has not yet started. The daifugō may only ask once, and if the daihinmin has more than one of the demanded rank, the daifugō must take that exact number of cards, up to the number of traded cards, regardless of rank. In return, the daifugō must give the daihinmin all the high cards he received from the daihinmin.

English Ranking System
This ranking is for a nine-player game. Add or subtract ranks depending on the number of players: King, Duke, Upper Class, Upper Middle Class, Middle Class, Lower Middle Class, Poor, Very Poor, Destitute

Extended Trading
After all of the cards are traded and before the round starts, the daifugō may allow for extended trading where individuals can barter their cards with other players. Trades need not be one card for one card. The daifugō may end trading at any time, but when trading is open, cannot control who trades what, and with whom; the daifugō is not allowed to do extended trading without it being open to all. Trading will also end when the first to go places his cards.

Tight, Follow Same Suit (縛り shibari)
When cards of the same suit are played consecutively, all subsequent cards in that trick must also be of the same suit. For example, if a player plays a 7 of Clubs, and the next player plays a 9 of Clubs, the third player cannot play a King of Spades (though he could play a King of Clubs). The same rule applies to pairs, threes-of-a-kind, or any other legal play depending on the rules used; so, for example, a pair of 5s (Clubs and Spades) followed by a pair of 7s (Clubs and Spades) would have to be followed by another Club-Spade combination. A variant of this rule allows "partial tights", in which any suit pattern between subsequent plays of more than one card must be followed for the rest of the trick: for example, a pair of 5s (Clubs-Spades) followed by a pair of 7s (Clubs-Diamonds) must be followed by a pair containing Clubs. Another tight variant requires that the same suit or combination of suits be played three times in a row in order for the suit(s) to "take". In some variants, the suit requirement is not official until a player notices the sequence and declares the suit name(s) out loud. Declaration is a significant part of strategy since only a player who can satisfy the suit requirement will benefit from declaration.

Poker hands
Straights, flushes, full houses, and straight flushes may be played during five-card tricks. Each hand thus played must beat the previous hand according to standard poker rules (straight flush beats four-of-a-kind beats full house beats flush beats straight).

Asshole/President
In North America, Daifugō is often played as a drinking game called "Asshole". The titles are President, Vice President, Common guy, Poor guy (Vice-Ass or Beer Wench), Asshole. Additional rules govern drinking (Common ones include the players being able to force anyone of a lower title to drink, or that the asshole buys the next round)

Rule of 7
If a player plays a seven, he may give the next player in turn order a card from his hand. A player can play any number of sevens, but after doing so, he must give the next player in turn order the number of cards equal to the number of sevens he just played.

Throwaway 10
If a player plays a ten, he may play another card from his hand. A player can play any number of tens, but after doing so, he must play the number of cards equal to the number of tens he just played.

Double 9 Ambulance
If 2 nines are played together, it does the same thing an eight would do except it needs to be 2 nines. You may not do this with 3 nines or 4 nines.

== Social aspects ==
Often the titles used in the game can be extended to social interactions. The daihinmin may be required to get up and fetch everyone's snacks and drinks (often this task is given to the hinmin so the daihinmin can shuffle and deal). Also the daifugō may be able to give an order after each round that must be followed, like "all heimin must bark like dogs", or "the hinmin must give me a backrub".

The daifugō - can also add rules related to the game itself, such as the rules in the list above, or any rule that suits him. It is often a good idea to impose limitations on such rule-making before the game starts, such as a maximum number of additional rules (requiring rules to be repealed when new ones are added), and allowing other players to override a new rule by unanimous vote (or a sufficiently large percentage).

== Popular culture ==
- In Fruits Basket, a popular manga and anime series, the characters in the story often play the card game with each other, emphasizing the fun social aspects of the game. In 2006, Score Entertainment released a Fruits Basket card game that contains a set of rules to Daifugō (in addition to an original game developed by Score).
- In volume 6 of Ouran High School Host Club, Haruhi Fujioka and Suoh Tamaki (very poor man and poor man, respectively) were made to obey Kyoya Ootori (rich man) after a game of Daifugō.
- The commercial game The Great Dalmuti is a custom Daifugo deck where lower numbered cards are strictly better, but the number of copies of each card in the deck equals its value - so, for example, 10 is the lowest card but there are 10 of them in the deck. This allows weak cards to be played in large sets which stronger cards cannot match. Dilbert: Corporate Shuffle is a further variant which adds three special effect cards.
- In the PC Game "Katawa Shoujo", Misha and Shizune challenge Hisao to play Daifugō against them.
- In Germany, there is a similar game by the name of "Vollarsch" or "Arschloch" (Asshole in German).
- In Belgium, the loser is called "Stront" (shit in Dutch)
- In Sweden, a common name for this game used to be "neger och president" which means Negro and President. This title reflects the injustice and hierarchy of slave-age USA. New titles (like just "President") have since been adopted, since the word "neger" is considered by many to be offensive.
- Similar to the Swedish and German versions, there is also a Greek variant of Daifugō called "Νίγκα" (Greek imitation of US-pronounced "nigga"). The original game play features 5 ranks (Masta, Half-Masta, Swiss, Half-Nigga, Nigga). Each player gets 6 cards and cards utilized are only sevens and up, with aces being the most powerful (No deuces are used). The remaining 2 cards (4*8 equals 32 whereas 5*6 equals 30) are called "the Swiss cards", because it's at the Swiss' discretion to swap at the start of each round 2 cards of his for these 2 "Swiss cards" as a one-time option. Also, the Kakumei-Revolution rule is standard. Other differences from the original Daifugō: There is no seat rearrangement at each round and no wild cards are being used.
- In the light novel and anime series The "Hentai" Prince and the Stony Cat., Tsukiko Tsutsukakushi invites Azusa Azuki, Yōto Yokodera and Tsukushi Tsutsukakushi to play Daihinmin while her house is flooded by the typhoon.
- In the video game Persona 5 Royal, a variation of this game can be played with members of the player character's team (which are known in the game as the Phantom Thieves).
  - In the western release of the game, the card game goes by the name "Tycoon".
- Japanese pop music group Hinatazaka46 included a group wide Daifugo tournament as bonus for the blu-ray editions of their fourth single.
