= Zheng Shangyou =

Chinese card game

- 争上游
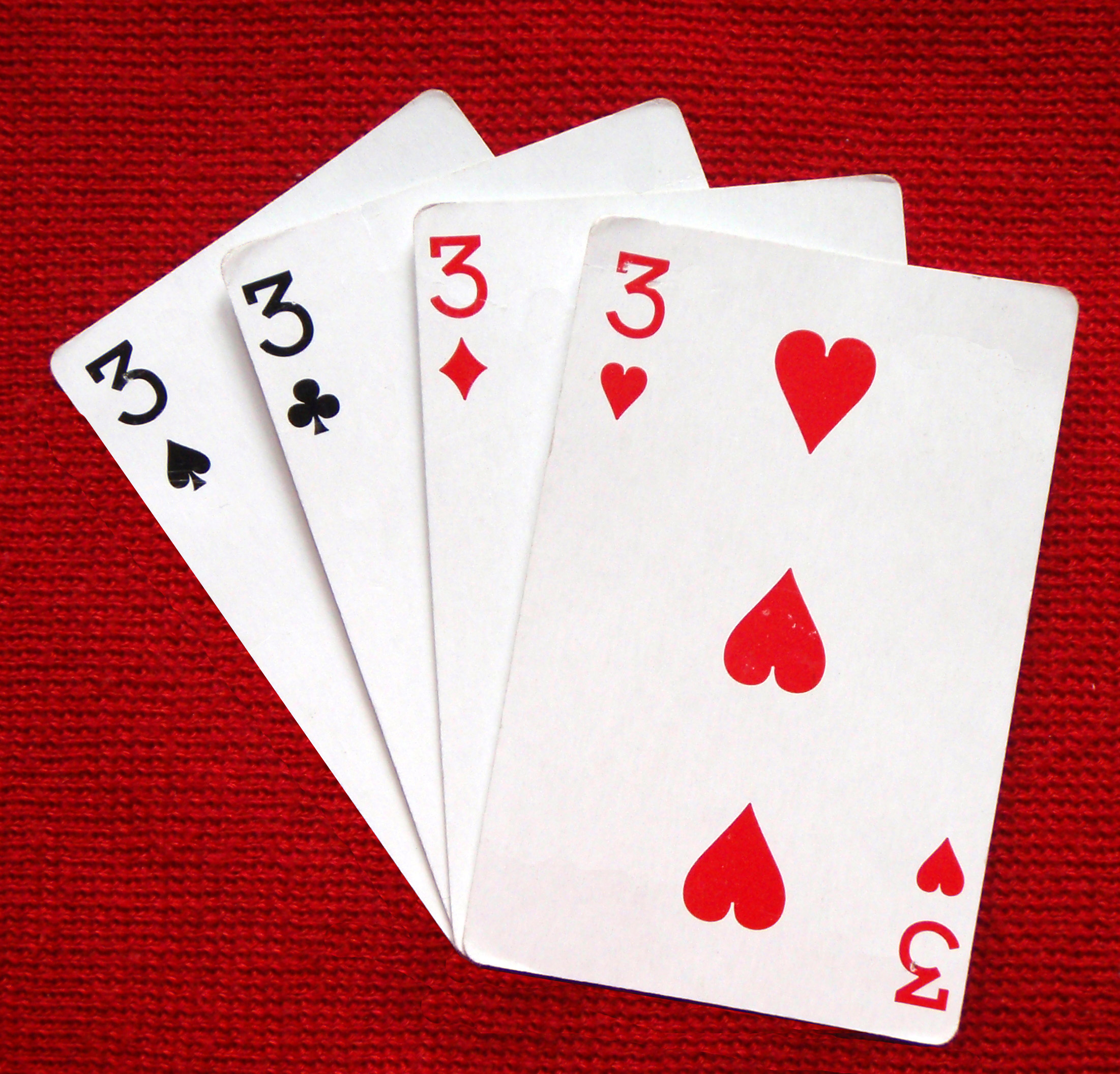
- Four or more cards of the same value are a bomb
- Type: Shedding-type
- Players: 4+
- Age range: all
- Deck: Anglo-American
- Rank (high→low): 2 A K Q J 10 9 8 7 6 5 4 3

Related games
- Big two • Dou dizhu • President

Zheng Shangyou (Chinese: 争上游; pinyin: Zhēng Shàngyóu; lit. 'struggling upstream') is a Chinese shedding card game similar to President and Big Two. It is the game from which Tien Len and other similar games are derived. It is popular in Shanghai, Zhejiang and Jiangsu.

== Rules ==
=== Cards ===
The game uses one or two standard 54-card decks, with thirteen cards in four suits plus two jokers, one red and one black in each. The game may or may not be played with a suit order: diamond being the lowest suit, followed by clubs, then hearts, spades. Like Big Two, twos rank high, and the rest of the deck ranks as usual: aces above kings, kings above queens, and so on, with threes being the lowest. The Jokers are the highest singles, and the red joker ranks higher than the black joker. Two decks may be used for four or more players.

=== Valid combinations ===
Cards may be played as singles, pairs, three of a kind, full house, four of a kind, straights (5 or more in a row), pair straights. etc. The leading card to a trick sets down the type of play. The allowed combinations are as follows. Different combinations do not beat each other, the only exception is the bomb.

- Single cards: Any card from the deck, ranking from 3, 4, 5, ..., Q, K, A, 2, black Joker, and red Joker, with red Joker being the highest single.
- Pairs: Any two cards of matching rank, ordered as with singular cards.
- Two [or more] pairs: Any number of pairs of cards with consecutive rank, e.g. 5-5-6-6, 5-5-6-6-7-7.
- Three-of-a-kind: Any three cards of matching rank, ordered as with singular cards. In a single deck game, players have the option to set up three-of-a-kind as a bomb before the gameplay.
- Two [or more] three-of-a-kind: Any number of three-of-a-kind with consecutive rank, e.g. 5-5-5-6-6-6.
- Three-of-a-kind with a single card: Players have the option to allow three-of-a-kind with a single card as a valid combination. Ordered by the rank of the triple, regardless of the single card.
- Full House: A composite of a three-of-a-kind combination and a pair. Ordered by the rank of the triple, regardless of the pair.
- Straight: Any five or more cards in a row. And it is connected form A2345 to 10JQKA, A2345 is the highest straight, 23456 is the second highest straight, 10JQKA is the third highest straight, 34567 is the lowest straight. The number of cards should match the current trick, i.e. one cannot play 3-4-5-6-7-8 to beat 3-4-5-6-7. Players have the option to set up straight flush (straight with the same suit) as a distinctive combination.
- Bomb: four or more (or, in some variations, three or more) cards of matching value. Can be played on all tricks except "larger" bombs (i.e. the four same cards having a higher value, or a bigger sized bomb, for example, 3-3-3-3-3 beats A-A-A-A). In a single deck game, players have the option to set up three-of-a-kind as a bomb before the gameplay.
- Ultra Bomb: The combination of a black Joker and the red Joker serves as the biggest bomb in a one deck game. With a two deck game, the ultimate bomb would be the combination of all four Jokers.

=== Dealing and playing ===
The dealer (who may be chosen by cutting the cards, as usual) shuffles the deck, to begin with and begins dealing out the cards singly, starting with himself, in a clockwise manner around the table. The cards are dealt out entirely.

At the beginning of the first game, the player with the "trick card" (typically the heart 3) starts first, with the trick card determined by the dealer, placed face up in the pile of cards he/she deals. Whoever it deals to starts. Play proceeds clockwise, with normal climbing-game rules applying: each player must play a higher card or combination than the one before, with the same number of cards. Players may also pass, thus declaring that he does not want to play (or does not hold the necessary cards to make a play possible). A pass does not hinder any further play in the game, each being independent.

When all but one of the players have passed in succession the trick is over, and the cards played are gathered up, and discarded and a new trick is started by the last player to play with their remaining cards. When a player plays the red joker as a single/double or a pair of 2s, it is sometimes customary for that player to restart play immediately by leading a new card or combination since the red joker cannot be beaten as a singleton, nor the pair of 2s, and the passes are mere formalities (except in the rare cases of another player having a bomb).

=== End game ===
The game continues until the Winner and Loser have been determined, the winner is the first person to play all their cards, the Loser is the player still holding cards when everyone else is out. After a Winner and Loser are established, the Loser must shuffle and deal out the next game. In one variation, the Loser must then give their highest card to the Winner in exchange for one card out of two cards of the Winner's choosing. The cards exchanged will be shown to the other players.

== Scoring ==
Scoring varies from place to place, and it is extremely rare to keep score. The most common version is that after a game each player with cards remaining scores -1 point for each unless they have 10 or more remaining, in which they score -2 for each. If they didn't get to play any cards at all, they score -3 for each. Then the winner of the hand scores +1 for every -1 his opponents got. (So, for example, if North won, and East, West, and South respectively still had 3, 11, and 8 cards left, East would score -3, West would score -22, South would score -8, and North would score +33.)

Likewise, for a 3-player game, a player with 17 cards remaining is deducted triple points. A player with more than 11 cards and less than 17 cards remaining is deducted double points.

== Variations ==
- The game can be played with 4 players, after removing the jokers to split a 52-card deck evenly among 4 players.
- It can be played that a straight can be higher than another straight by just the suit of the highest card, not requiring a full rank
- Revolution: a four of a kind makes low cards high and high cards low. (this is not playable with the Bomb variation.)
- For two-person play: six decks are dealt face-down, and players are assigned alternating decks. The game proceeds as normal with each player representing three people. After picking up a deck and looking at the cards, something must be played, or else that deck gets last place (or if some deck is already in last place, then second-last place). To determine the winner, add each player's places (ex. for 1st place add 1); the player with the smallest total score wins (ex. 1st, 4th, and 5th place beats 2nd, 3rd, and 6th).

== See also ==
- Dou dizhu, which has similar rules but is played with three players
- Big two
