= The Great Dalmuti =

Card game

- Retail packaging.
- Origin: United States
- Designer: Richard Garfield
- Type: Shedding-type
- Players: 3+
- Skills: Memory, Tactics, Communication
- Age range: 8+
- Cards: 80 (2 Jesters)
- Deck: 12-step triangular (+2 Wild)
- Rank (high→low): Jester (wild), Dalmuti, Archbishop, Earl Marshal, Baroness, Abbess, etc...
- Play: Clockwise
- Playing time: 10 min.
- Chance: Medium

Related games
- President, Dai Hin Min

The Great Dalmuti is a shedding-type card game published by Wizards of the Coast in February 1995.

== Description ==
The Great Dalmuti, a card game for 4–8 players, is a commercial variant of the card game of President and the Japanese game Daifugō. The object of the game is to become the Greater Dalmuti and remain in that office for as long as possible by being the first person to get rid of all the cards in their hand.

=== Components ===
The game is sold in a box containing two 40-card decks consisting of twelve 12s, eleven 11s, ten 10s, nine 9s, eight 8s, seven 7s, six 6s, five 5s, four 4s, three 3s, two 2s, one 1, and two Jesters. (One Jester played by itself counts as a 13. If played in conjunction with another card, the Jester takes on the value of the other card as a wild card.)

=== Card names and ranks ===
Each card in Dalmuti has a medieval name. Each rank is represented by an equal number of cards to its rank, except for the two Jesters.

Card	Rank
Jester	13 (wild)
Peasant	12
Stonecutter	11
Shepherdess	10
Cook	9
Mason	8
Seamstress	7
Knight	6
Abbess	5
Baroness	4
Earl Marshal	3
Archbishop	2
Dalmuti	1

=== Setup ===
Each player draws a card and reveals its rank. (For purposes of the draw, the Jester counts as the highest card.) The players then seat themselves around the table in clockwise order from lowest card to highest. The person who drew the lowest card is the Greater Dalmuti, the player to the left of the Greater Dalmuti is the Lesser Dalmuti, the player to the right of the Greater Dalmuti (the player who drew the highest card) is the Greater Peon, and the person to the right of the Greater Peon is the Lesser Peon. All other players are Merchants.

=== Gameplay ===
1. Deal: The Greater Peon shuffles the cards and deals out the entire deck to the players until it is exhausted, even if this means some players get more cards than others.
2. Taxes: The Greater Peon must give the Greater Dalmuti the lowest two cards in their hand, and in exchange, the Greater Dalmuti gives the Greater Peon any two cards from their hand. The Lesser Dalmuti likewise gives any one card in their hand to the Lesser Peon, and receives in exchange the Lesser Peon's lowest card. However, if a player has two Jesters, they may call for an end to taxation (called a "revolution"). If the player with two Jesters is the Greater Peon, then it is a "Greater Revolution", and all players are reseated in reverse order – The Greater Dalmuti becomes the Greater Peon, the Lesser Dalmuti becomes the Lesser Peon, and so on.
3. First round: The Greater Dalmuti plays a set of one or more cards of the same rank from their hand, such as four 12s or two 9s or one 7. Plays then proceeds clockwise. The next player can either play the same number of cards but lower in rank than those played, or pass. The player can substitute a Jester as a wild card in order to make a set. Example: In a 5-player game, the Greater Dalmuti plays two 9s. The player to the left plays two 7s. The third player can now play two cards lower than 7, and having one 6 and one Jester, plays them as a pair of 6s. The fourth player has four 5s, but chooses to hold on to them as a set rather than losing two of them and passes. The fifth player does not have a pair of cards lower than 6 and passes. Play moves back to the Greater Dalmuti, and so on.
4. Subsequent rounds: Once everyone has passed, the round is finished. The last person able to play a card leads a card or set of cards to start another round.
5. Going out: When a player successfully sheds all their cards, the player sits out the rest of that hand, and play continues with players who still have cards.
6. End of the hand: When all players but one have successfully gotten rid of all their cards, the hand ends.
7. Reseating for the next hand: For the next hand, players are reseated according to the order in which they successfully got rid of their cards: the first person to have done so becomes the Greater Dalmuti, and all other players are seated clockwise in the order that they shed all their cards; the last player, who did not get rid of all their cards, becomes the Greater Peon, seated to the right of the Greater Dalmuti. The Greater Peon then shuffles and deals the cards to start another hand.

=== Ending the game ===
There are no victory conditions. Play continues until the players end the game by mutual consent, or an agreed-to time limit is reached.

== Publication history ==
The rules for The Great Dalmuti were designed by Richard Garfield, and the 80-card deck was illustrated by Margaret Organ-Kean. Wizards of the Coast (WotC) published the game for the North American market in 1995. Several companies also published the game for other international markets, including AMIGO, Bergsala Enigma, Devir, Hasbro, Korea Boardgames Co., Lautapelit.fi, Play Factory, PS-Games, and Swan Panasia Co. After ceasing production of the game, WotC re-released it in 2005.

== Reception ==
In the May 1995 edition of Dragon (Issue 217), Lester W. Smith said "the game is fun," but cautioned that this was not one of designer Richard Garfield's best games, saying, "People who purchase this game expecting another Garfield masterpiece are likely to be disappointed, especially if they’ve played a version of it before with regular playing cards. But the art is good; the package is nice; the rules are well written; and play is enjoyable."

On the German website GoodGameGuide, the reviewer noted the Jesters and the possibility of revolution was a major improvement to the game's generic card game predecessor. The reviewer concluded by giving the game an average 6 out of 10 rating, saying,. "A nice card game for in-between times with several people."

== Reviews ==
- Family Games: The 100 Best

== Awards ==
- Mensa awarded The Great Dalmuti "Best New Mind Game of 1995"
- The Great Dalmuti was included in Games Magazine's "Top 100 Games of 1996".
- In 2004, The Great Dalmuti was nominated for the Nederlandse Spellenprijs

== Corporate Shuffle ==
Dilbert's Corporate Shuffle is a Dalmuti spinoff based on the comic strip Dilbert., using the same game mechanics but set in Dilbert's cubicle hell. It was released in May 1997 and sold in 60-card fixed decks as a dedicated deck card game for four to six players.

The Dalmuti and Peon ranks are replaced by the Big Boss, Little Boss, Senior Intern, and Junior Intern. Taxation is called Executive Bonuses, and Revolution is called Corporate Takeover. The two jesters are called Dogbert, and several special cards are added to the deck:

- Twirling Wedgie, a card with value 6 which also allows the player to choose another player who may not play any further cards in that trick.
- Ratbert, a single card with value 11 (worse than any other card) with the special rule that any player who wins a trick containing Ratbert must take it into their hand, unless no other cards were played in the hand or the trick winner played his last card in the round. Thus, this allows players a "free" chance to throw away a useless single, with the tradeoff that they'll have to offer the same chance to other players later in the hand.
- Dogbert, World Ruler, a single card with value 0 (better than any other card). The Dogbert, World Ruler card can only be played during tricks of single cards and immediately wins that trick.

When executive bonuses are granted to the bosses, wilds are given first, then the numerical cards in order from smallest to largest.

Card	Rank
Ratbert	11
Engineer	10
Marketing	9
Sales	8
Managers	7
Accounting	6
Twirling Wedgie	6
Human Resources	5
Lawyers	4
Consultants	3
Vice Presidents	2
CEO	1
Dogbert, World Ruler	0
Dogbert	W!
