= Dou dizhu =

Card game

- 斗地主
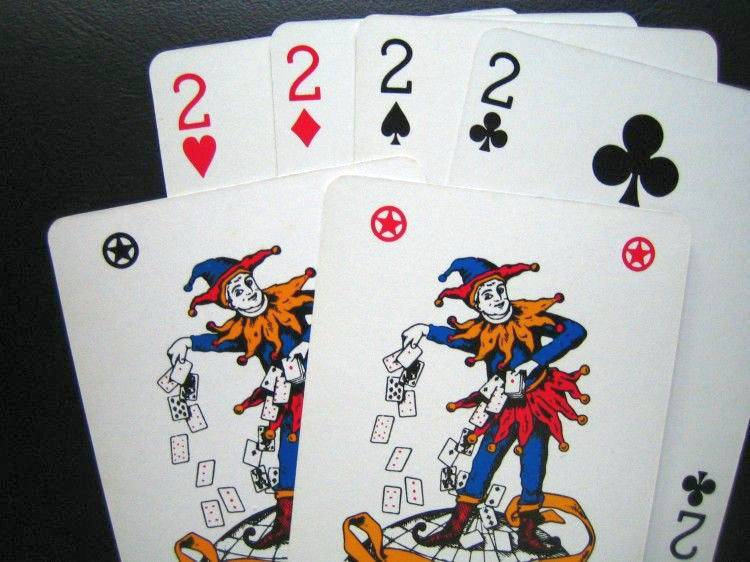
- Two "bombs" in the game; four twos, and a pair of jokers
- Origin: Chinese
- Alternative names: Landlord, fighting the landlord, dau dei zyu
- Type: Shedding-type card game
- Players: 3
- Cards: 54; 17 for each of the two "peasants" and 20 for the "landlord"
- Deck: French
- Play: Counterclockwise
- Playing time: Around 5 minutes
- Chance: Easy

Related games
- Big two • President • Zheng Shangyou

Dou dizhu (simplified Chinese: 斗地主; traditional Chinese: 鬥地主; pinyin: dòu dìzhǔ; Jyutping: dau^{3} dei^{6} zyu^{2}; lit. 'fighting the landlord') is a card game in the genre of shedding and gambling. It is one of the most popular card games played in China.

Dou dizhu is described as easy to learn but hard to master, requiring mathematical and strategic thinking as well as carefully planned execution. Suits are irrelevant in playing dou dizhu. Players can easily play the game with a set of dou dizhu playing cards, without the suits printed on the cards. Less popular variations of the game do exist in China, such as four-player and five-player dou dizhu played with two packs of cards.

== Culture ==
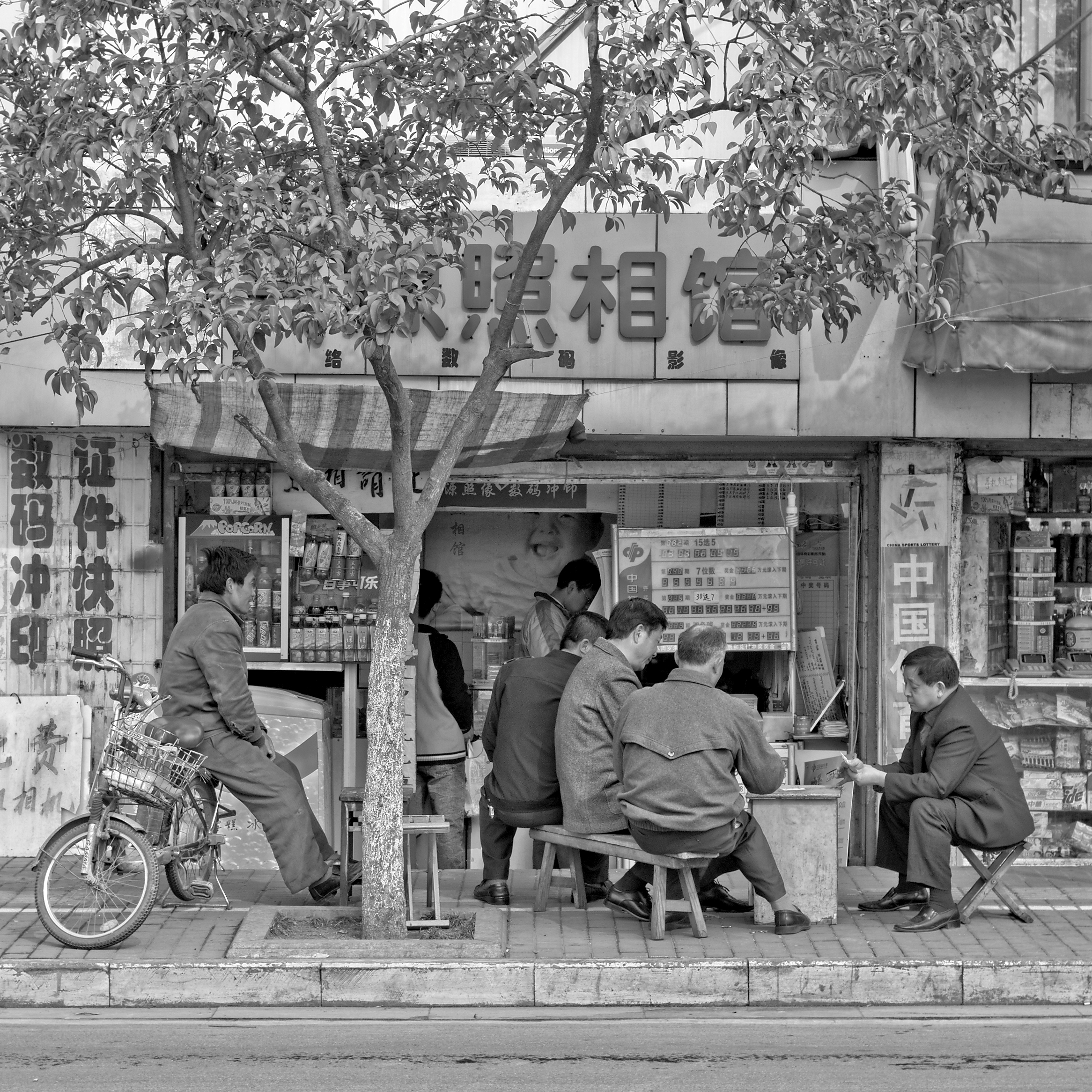
People playing card games in the street in Nanjing, China

The class struggle during the land reform in the 1950s after the Chinese Communist Party took over China encouraged peasants to take up arms against the landlords, hence the name dou dizhu. China's Generation Y, who are among the most enthusiastic player groups, has no personal experience of this specific overt class struggle (compare with the covert contemporary property bubble). Nowadays, the name of the game carries no negative connotation. The actual place of origin for the game is in Hubei Province.

== Gameplay ==
A 52-card deck, including two Joker cards (one of each color), is shuffled and distributed among three players. The last three cards are placed on one side.

All players first review and appraise their own cards without showing their cards to the other players. Then, players take turns to bid for the landlord position by telling the other players to choose their stake levels, from one to three. If at least one player bid on a level, other players may choose to either pass or bid on a higher level. If all three players however chose not to bid any level, the deck is reshuffled.

The player is assigned as the role of "landlord" (地主), either if the player bids on level three, or in the case both players have passed, the player who bid last took the role. The player with the role takes the last three cards, which is revealed to the other players. The "landlord" begin each match, while the other players become "peasants". The order may be determined at random or decided by the players.

As with Crazy Eights and Big Two, the objective is to be the first player to discard all cards. Each round begins with a discard of any suits and any card combination. The rank follows the same as Big Two, but with the inclusion of the jokers, the Red Joker (大王) has the highest rank, followed by Black Joker (小王), then the twos. Unlike Big Two, suits are not used to break ties. The following combinations can be played, in order of reversed precedence:

- Single (单牌): one card
- Pair (一对): two cards of the same rank.
- Chained pair (连对): two sequences consisting of the same numbers with at least three ranks.
- Straight (顺子): five or more cards of sequential rank, disregarding suits. Straight flushes (straight of the same suit) falls under this category, unlike conventional poker.
- Three-of-a-kind (三条): three cards of the same rank.
- Three-to-one (三带一): three cards of the same rank, plus a kicker.
- Three-to-two (三带二 or 三带一对): three cards of the same rank, plus a pair. Also called "full house" in conventional poker term.
- Airplane (飞机 or 双顺): two triplets with successive sequential ranks.
- Airplane with small wings (飞机带小翼): Airplane with either two kickers or a pair.
- Airplane with large wings (飞机带大翼): Airplane with two pairs.
- Quad-to-two (四带二): four cards of the same rank, with two kickers or two pairs.
- Bomb (炸弹): four cards of the same rank, without pairs. Also called "four-of-a-kind" in conventional poker term.
- Nuke (核弹, 火箭, 王炸): a pair of two jokers.

The bomb and the nuke can be played at any time, as it override any standard hand combinations except for the nuke. Any bombs or nukes played increase the bonus multiplier.

The following rules apply on kickers:

- Any kickers should not be of the same rank as that of the triplet or quad in question (when discarding three-to-one, three-to-two, airplane with wings, or quad-to-two)
- The rank for the highest triplet or quad determines priority, thus any rank can be used for the kicker when required.
- When playing jokers as a kicker, only one card can be discarded at a time. Discarding jokers as a pair is not allowed.
- When discarding cards of consecutive ranks (chained pairs, straights or airplane), there is no limit on how many ranks can be discarded. However, twos cannot be used as a pair for chained pairs. Jokers have no rank value and thus cannot be used for this discard.
- A bomb is not considered as two pairs, and a nuke is not considered as a pair.

If any point the player either wants to save the card or could not play any available combinations, they may choose to pass. If both players passed, a fresh round starts. The match ends where the player discarded every card from their hand.

== Scoring rules ==
The scoring depends of which side is the winner, either if the landlord or the peasant making the match's last discard. If the winner is a landlord, the peasants pay an equal payment to the landlord. If the winner is a peasant, the landlord pays the value of the hand, splitting the payment equally to the peasants. The amount of payment determines the bid for the initial stake, and multiplier counter based if how many players have been "springing" (春天 or 反春; did not discard any cards at all), and how many bombs or nukes are played in the game.

== Variations ==
=== Four-player ===
A four-player variant of dou dizhu is played mainly in Zhejiang and Jiangsu provinces, including Shanghai. Two deck of cards for a total of 108 cards (including two sets of two jokers) are used. 25 cards are dealt to each player and another eight more cards given to the appointed "landlord" player. As with the standard game, bombs and nukes can be played anytime and overlaps other hand combinations. The game also have some variants in terms on discards:

- Jokers, when played as pairs, are treated as a pair, providing if the jokers are of the same color; because of the same color requirements, it cannot be used as discards for three-of-a-kind.
- When discarding kickers, at least one pair must be included; the only allowed hands with this discard are Three-to-two, Airplane and airplane with large wings.
- Straights are also permitted, but K-A-2 combination are not allowed.
- The bombs can be of five-different levels, with at least four cards of the same rank. As with the standard game, the bombs are not considered as either "three-to-two" or "airplanes".
- The nuke requires all four jokers to be discarded. As with the standard game, the nuke is not considered as a "chained pair".
- If the landlord have a "bomb" with seven cards or a "nuke", they may "check" the hand, or "double check" if the "bomb" consists of eight cards. When making such declaration, they must reveal their cards at once. The landlord may chose to end the game immediately (which results in the landlord winning) or continue playing, in which that combination is discarded and the multiplier will be increased.
- Depending on how many points bid for the peasants, they may allow a number of "bomb" discards during a game. If the peasants bid none, they may only discard a bomb once. However, if the peasants did not make a bid, the limit will not apply. Landlord also allow unlimited number of bomb discards.

=== With wild cards ===
Another variation of dou dizhu is the edition with wild cards. Like the original settings, after the determination of the landlord, four-of-a-kind will be randomly selected as wild cards. Those can be used to stand for any other cards, except jokers.

Some games even feature two sets of wild cards. The first set would be drawn before the bid for the landlord, then another one would then be drawn out.

== Popularity ==
Dou dizhu was once just a provincial game in China, originating in the Huangshan District and Anhui. Thanks to the debut of dou dizhu online, the game has become more widespread and is now a national game in China. Its popularity increased substantially, with players on one system doubling in two years, from around 50,000 players in December 2002 to 100,000 in 2004 and by 2005, dou dizhu held the leading spot among China's 17,900,000 regular casual-game players. There are almost 1 million concurrent dou dizhu players on the Tencent QQ game platform alone. It is more popular than other Chinese card games like Chinese poker, Zheng Shangyou, and big two.

Year	Popularity in China	Source
2002	50,000 players	GICQ(ourgame.com)
2004	100,000 players	GICQ(ourgame.com)
2005	17,900,000 players being the loyal fans of the casual game while dou dizhu leading the core place.	Chinese Online Game Research Report in 2005 made by iResearch
2006	+1,000,000 online player play it concurrently	Tencent QQ game platform in China
2008	roughly 1,450,000 online players per hour in Tencent QQ game platform	Tencent QQ game platform in China
2008	roughly 76,000 online players per hour in GICQ	GICQ
