= Tiến lên =

Vietnamese shedding-type card game

Tiến Lên
- Vietnamese card game
- The Two of Hearts is the highest-ranking card in Tiến Lên.
- Origin: Vietnamese
- Alternative names: Viet Cong; VC; Thirteen; Killer; 2’s
- Type: Shedding-type; Climbing-type
- Players: 2-8
- Age range: All ages
- Deck: Standard 52-card deck
- Rank (high→low): 2 A K Q J 10 9 8 7 6 5 4 3
- Play: Clockwise
- Playing time: Approx. 5 mins

Related games
- President

Tiến lên (Vietnamese: tiến lên, tiến: advance; lên: to go up, up; lit. 'go forward'; also romanized Tien Len) is a shedding-type card game originating in Vietnam. It may be considered Vietnam's national card game, and is common in communities where Vietnamese migration has occurred. It is also played in the United States, sometimes under the names Viet Cong, VC, Thirteen (which is also the common English name in Australia's Vietnamese migrant community), Killer, or 2’s.

== Core rules ==
The game has many local variants. The core rules are relatively simple and are taken from the main 4-player rule sets provided by John McLeod and David Parlett.

=== Preliminaries ===
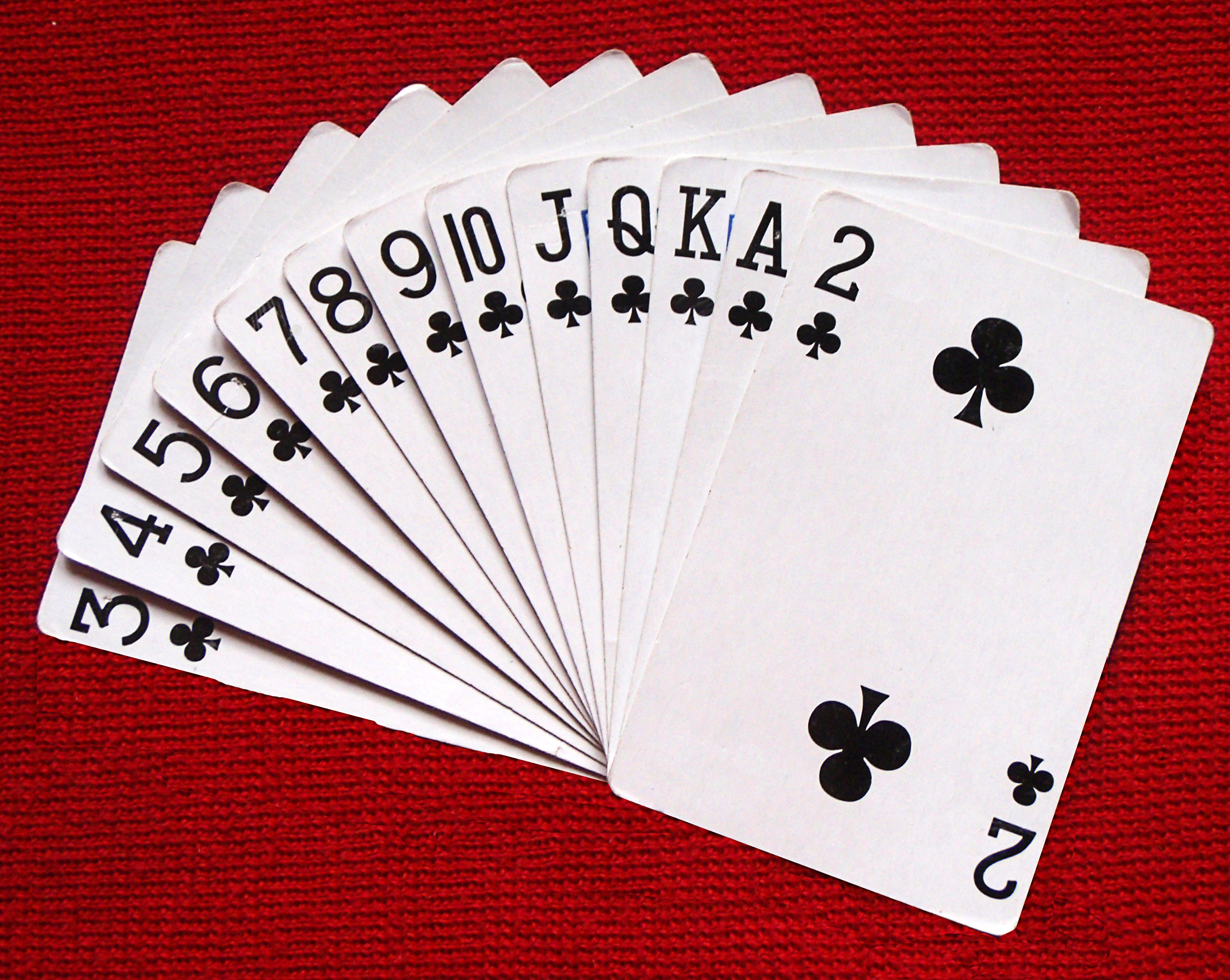
The suit of clubs ranked from lowest to highest; also a possible, though unlikely hand at Tiến Lên.

Deal 4 players 13 cards each from a standard 52-card deck. Deal and play is clockwise. For the first hand, the dealer is picked randomly; for subsequent hands, the loser of the previous hand deals.

Cards rank (from high to low): 2 A K Q J 10 9 8 7 6 5 4 3. Within the numerical ranking, suits rank (from high to low): Hearts ♥ – Diamonds ♦ – Clubs ♣ – Spades ♠. So for example (from higher to lower): 2♠ A♥ A♦ A♣ A♠ K♥. Thus 2♥ is the highest card and 3♠ the lowest.

Players in turn discard single cards, or card combinations, to a central face-up pile. The objective is to avoid being the last player to hold any cards.

=== Outplay ===
==== Leading ====
For the first hand, the player holding the lowest card begins by playing it singly, starting a face-up discard pile in the center. (When 4 people play, this will always be the 3♠.) In subsequent hands, the winner of the previous hand begins, and may play any card or combination.

Valid cards or combinations that may be led are:

- A single card
- A pair of the same rank, as 4♠ 4♥
- A triplet of the same rank, as 9♦ 9♣ 9♠
- A quartet of the same rank, as A♥ A♦ A♣ A♠
- A sequence of 3 or more cards, regardless of suit, as 9♣ 10♦ J♣
- A double sequence of 3 or more pairs, regardless of suit, as 5♣ 5♠ 6♥ 6♦ 7♣ 7♦

Sequences may not "go around the corner". 2 is not allowed in sequence

==== Following ====
Each player, in turn, may either play or pass. To play, they must contribute a card or combination to the pile that matches the type (single, pair, etc.) of the one previously played, but beats it in rank. The highest-ranking card of each combination determines which beats which. Thus, if 9♥ 10♦ J♣ is led, it can be beaten by 9♠ 10♠ J♦, because the highest card of the second sequence (J♦) outranks the highest card of the first sequence (J♣). Naturally, it would also be beaten by any 10 J Q or higher sequence.

Passing and playing continues around until there is a card or combination that no one can beat. Once a player has passed, they may not play again to this pile, but players may contribute more than 1 card or combination to the pile as long as they have not yet passed. When the winning card or combination has been determined, its player gathers the pile, sets it to the side, and leads any card or combination to a fresh pile.

==== Bombs ====
The exceptions to the strict rule of matching type and beating rank are called bombs and they may be played only against presently-winning 2s as follows:

- A single 2 may be beaten by any double sequence of 3+ pairs, as 4♣ 4♠ 5♥ 5♦ 6♣ 6♦ or a quartet, as 3♥ 3♦ 3♣ 3♠
- A pair of 2s may be beaten by any double sequence of 4+ pairs, as 4♣ 4♠ 5♥ 5♦ 6♣ 6♦ 7♠ 7♥ or a quartet, as 3♥ 3♦ 3♣ 3♠
- A triplet of 2s may be beaten by any double sequence of 5+ pairs, as 4♣ 4♠ 5♥ 5♦ 6♣ 6♦ 7♠ 7♥ 8♦ 8♣

A bomb is not unbeatable but, once played, its type becomes the type that the other players must match and beat, rather than that of the card or combination originally led to the current pile.

A bomb can be used by any player at any time, even if it is not their turn.

=== Ending the game ===
As players play their last cards, they drop out of play. If the leader to a new pile has no cards remaining, the lead passes to the next active player to the left. The game ends when only one player is left with any cards. That player is the loser. In a gambling game, the loser pays each other player a fixed stake; in a drinking game, they buy the next round; in a friendly game, they shuffle the deck for the next match.

== Variants ==
=== Number of players ===
2-4 may play, being dealt 13 cards each; alternatively 3 players may be dealt 17 cards each.

5 to 8 may play using a doubled deck of 104 cards. Either deal out 13 cards to each player, or deal out as many cards to each player as may be done equally.

In all cases, any excess cards have no further role in the hand, and may be set aside face-down.

Using a double deck raises the possibility of a card or combination that ties the previous one (an impossibility with a single deck). Published sources do not address this, but the logical resolutions are:

- Such a play is not allowed, since it fails to beat the previous card or combination.
- A later nominal tie is considered to beat the earlier card or combination.
- Ties of the highest cards in combinations are broken by their highest distinct cards, and if on this basis the later combination beats the earlier, it may be played (this option cannot function for single cards or combinations that are exactly identical).

=== Viet Cong (VC) ===
Viet Cong (or VC) is an American form, played as above but with these variant rules:

- A player dealt four 2s wins automatically, with no outplay.
- The holder of the 3♠ must include it in the leading combination.
- 2s may not be included in a single sequence (although they may occur in double sequences).
- The 2-beating combinations (referred to above as "bombs") are called slams, and their rules are:
  - A single 2 is beaten by any quartet or a double sequence of 3+ pairs (same as above)
  - A pair of 2s is beaten by 2 consecutive quartets or a double sequence of 5+ pairs
  - A triplet of 2s is beaten by 3 consecutive quartets or a double sequence of 7+ pairs
- Optionally, the game may be played with trading: after the deal and before the initial lead, any 2 players may exchange any equal number of cards with each other. The specific cards of the trade must be mutually agreed to; if not, there is no trade. When playing with trading, four 2s do not win automatically.

== Similar games ==
Stewart Culin records the Chinese game Tá T’ín Kau ("to play heavens and nines"), which he calls "the best and most highly developed of the Chinese games with dominoes". It is a 4-handed trick-taking game played with a standard set of 32 Chinese dominos (or equally, domino cards). Each player begins with a hand of 8 dominos. Similarly to Tiến lên, the first player leads a single domino or correlated combination of 2, 3, or 4 dominos to the trick. Contrary to Tiến lên, each player must contribute an equal number of dominos to the trick, whether they can beat the lead or not. The winner of the last trick wins the round, on the condition that he or she has won at least 2 tricks in the round. In Tá T’ín Kau each card led plus its following cards counts as a trick: leading a pair constitutes playing for 2 tricks simultaneously. Culin's informants implied that the game was over 100 years old in 1893 (the time of documentation).

In a later article, Culin records the Chinese game Chá Kau Tsz’ ("taking nine tricks"), which he believes to be derived from Tá T’ín Kau. This is a 3-handed trick-taking game played with a doubled pack of Qing money-suited cards. Similarly to Tiến lên and Tá T’ín Kau, the first player may lead a single card, or a sequence of at least 3 cards of one suit, or 3 to 6 cards of the same rank as long as all 3 suits are represented… and any number of the non-suited cards (red flower, white flower, and old thousand) may be added to a valid combination of 1s. Again, contrary to Tiến lên (but similarly to Tá T’ín Kau), each player must contribute an equal number of cards to the trick, whether they can beat the lead or not. The first to win 9 tricks wins the game. In Chá Kau Tsz’ each complete lead and all following contributions counts as a single trick: leading a sequence of 4 cards constitutes playing for only 1 trick.

Sid Sackson adapted Chá Kau Tsz’ to a 2-, 3-, or 4-handed game using a 60-card deck than can be constructed out of 2 standard 52-card decks.

Also similar are the Chinese games Big two and Dou dizhu ("fighting the landlord").
