= President (card game) =

Card game

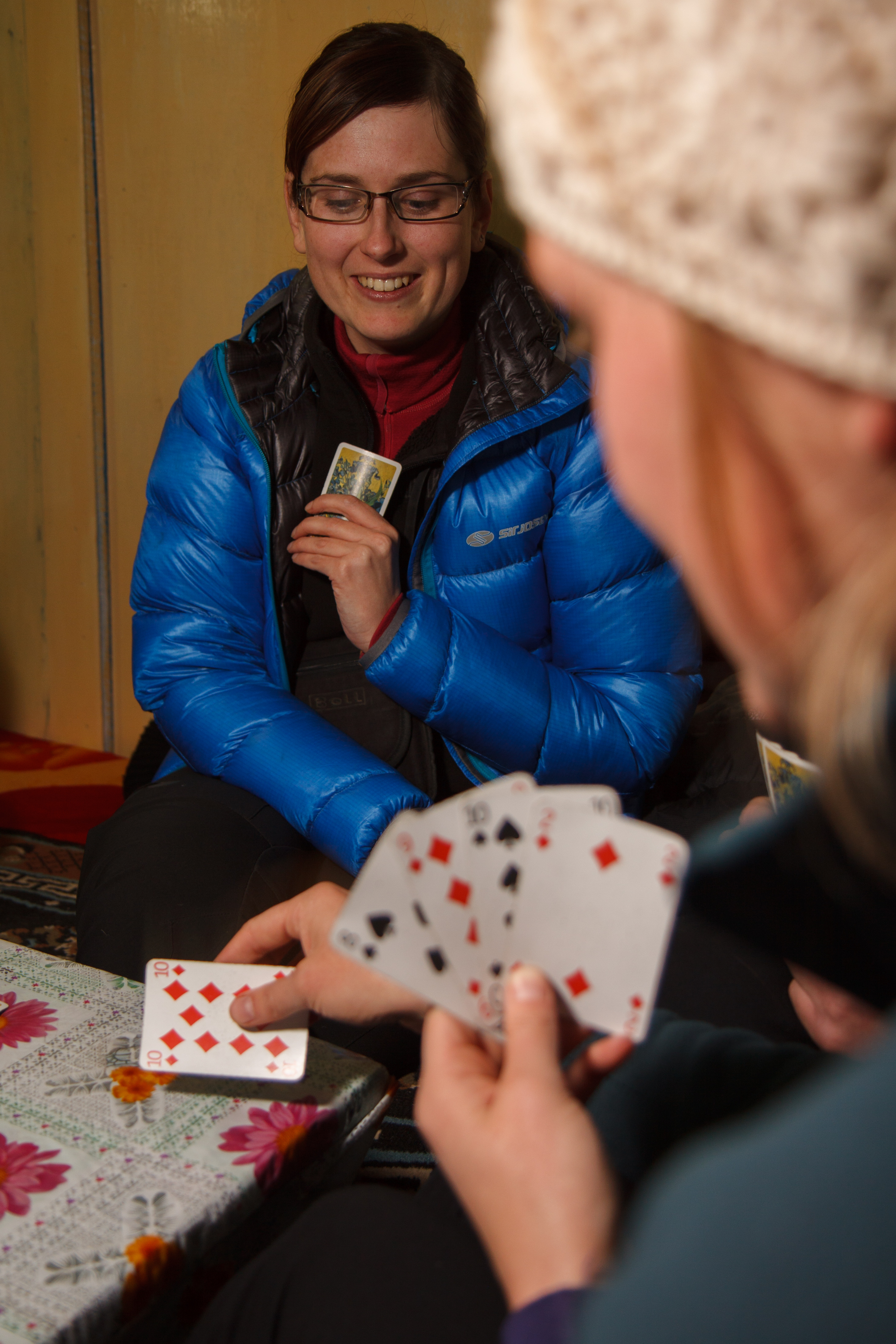
- The "Scum" player passes their highest card to the "President"
- Alternative names: Scum, Asshole, Butt, Arsehole
- Type: Shedding-type
- Players: 3–8; 9+ with multiple decks
- Cards: 54 (2 jokers)
- Deck: French
- Rank (high→low): Joker, deuce (2), ace, king, etc.
- Play: Clockwise
- Playing time: 5–15 min.

Related games
- Daifugō (Japan) • Zheng Shangyou (China) Durak (Russia)

President (also commonly called Asshole, Scum, or Capitalism, or P's & A's) is a shedding card game for three or more, in which the players race to get rid of all of the cards in their hands in order to become "president" in the following round. It is a Westernized version of Chinese climbing card games such as Zheng Shangyou, Tien Len in Vietnam and the Japanese Daifugō.

President can also be played as a drinking game, and commercial versions of the game with a non-standard deck exist, including The Great Dalmuti and Presidents Card Game.

== Special titles ==
There may be many titles used by players during the game. Often, players move seats to sit in the order of their place, so as not to forget the order. There is generally at least a president, vice-president and scum. However, this game is usually played with up to 6 players, and if so, more titles may be needed.

The rankings for four players are as follows:

- President – the winner of the previous round, regardless of number of players.
- Vice-president ("VP") – second place, regardless of the number of players.
- Person (or other name, commonly "citizen" etc.) – the other players.
- High-Scum (Vice-Scum) (or other names) – next-to-last place. (For example, in a seven-person game, high-scum is whoever placed sixth.)
- Scum (or other names, commonly "asshole", "bum","Holborsel") – last place in the previous round. If the scum is last place, they get to go first to start the round.

There are other titles for games with larger numbers of player with various names.

Rules regarding card passing can be changed to accommodate these two positions if desired. A large or odd number of players generally calls for having at least one "Person" role, but there can be as many as needed.

The President (or the Scum in some versions) deals the cards, starting with themselves and proceeding in order of player hierarchy from low to high until all cards are dealt. If the Scum is the dealer, this ensures that the President begins with the fewest cards if the hands are uneven.

== How to play ==
The rules provided are one way to play the game;.

=== Dealing ===
The person who is president (or the scum in some versions) shuffles and deals the cards. The cards are dealt in clockwise rotation. Some players may have more cards than others, if the deck cannot be divided equally.

After cards are dealt, the scum must hand over the best card in their hand to the president, and the president passes back any card they do not want.

Variations with multiple top and two bottom positions often require the scum to hand additional cards to the president, up to the number of top positions in the game. (For example, a game with a secretary and clerk might call for the scum to hand over three cards to the president, the high-scum to hand over two cards to the vice-president and the clerk to hand over one card to the secretary.) In any event, the players who receive cards from the bottom positions always hand back an equal number of "junk" cards that they do not want. They are not obliged to pass back their lowest cards.

=== Playing ===
Play in President is organized into tricks, much like in spades or bridge. However, unlike those games, each trick can involve more than one card or group of cards played by each player, and players may choose to not play in a trick. Usually, suits are irrelevant, but variants exist that include trump suits.

The player on the dealer's left begins by leading any number of cards of the same rank (1–4; 5 or more are possible with wildcards, jokers or multiple decks). The player on the left may then play an equal number of matching cards with a higher face value, or may pass. (In a few variants, it is permitted to play cards with an equal value as the last cards played; doing so may skip the player next in order.) Note that the same number of cards as the lead must be played; e.g., if the leader starts with a pair then only pairs may be played on top of it, and if three-of-a-kind was led then only three-of-a-kinds can be played on top of it. (There are notable exceptions among the many variants in this game.) The next player may do the same, and so on.

This continues until all players have had a turn (which may or may not be because the highest-value card has already been played), or opted to pass.

=== End of a round ===
When one player runs out of cards, they have won and are out of play for the rest of the round, but the other players might continue to play to determine the remaining titles (position). A few versions hold that once a player goes out, players count remaining card values to establish titles, or simply count the number of cards remaining in each player's hand, and other versions have one player left with cards at the end.

When playing by traditional rules, once titles are decided, most players stand and move position to accommodate the winner's seated position. The President is the dealer (or the Scum in some versions), and the players must rearrange themselves around them so that they are seated in order of rank, clockwise. Some variants do not rearrange the seating of the players, so everyone plays in the same order each hand (though the president still leads the first trick).

After the first round has determined player rank, subsequent hands are opened by the president.

=== Notes on game play ===
The order of card values differs slightly from most American and English card games. The 2 is the highest-ranking card (except for the Joker, if it is used) and is normally unbeatable. However, some variants allow a single 2 to be beaten by a pair of 2s. The Ace is the next highest card, followed by the King, Queen, and so on, with the 3 being the lowest-ranked card.

Some variants allow a single 2 to be played on top of any other combination, although most games require the same number of 2s to be played as were originally led. In a few variants, the 2 (and no other card) may be played at any time, even if it is not the player’s turn.

On the U.S. West Coast and in Hawaii, some versions rank the Ace as the highest card and the 2 as the lowest. It may also be played as an Aces-high game in which 2s are wild, the Red 3 is the highest-ranking card, and 2s cannot beat Red 3s. The Black 3s are the lowest cards, and 2s may be used as Black 3s. In the first round, the player holding the 3 of Spades takes the first turn. In these variants, a pair of 2s is not required to clear a pair.

Players may pass at any time, even if they have a valid play available. Depending on the variant, passing may or may not prevent that player from playing again during the same trick.

The number of cards that can be led at the start of a trick depends only on the cards in the player’s hand and their chosen strategy. For example, in a two-deck game, it is perfectly legal to begin a trick with seven 5s, provided the player actually holds all seven. This makes winning a trick and gaining the lead especially important.

A bomb is a special play used to immediately clear the current trick. In many variants, bombs consist of 2s. Bombs may only be played on the player’s turn.

Players may never lead a trick with a 2 or a bomb.

If a player makes a play and no other player can beat it, the played cards are discarded, and that player immediately leads a new trick with any valid combination. This process continues until play returns to the player who made the last successful play. If they cannot continue under the rules of that variant, the current cards are discarded, and they begin a new trick with any legal play of their choice.

Players may continue making consecutive plays after all other players have passed until they choose to stop or are no longer able to continue, depending on the rules of the variant.

== Variations ==
Some play that the holder of the lowest card of a particular suit (e.g. 3♣) leads the first deal.

== See also ==
- Durak, a similar game
