= Big two =

Chinese card game

- 大老二 or 鋤大弟
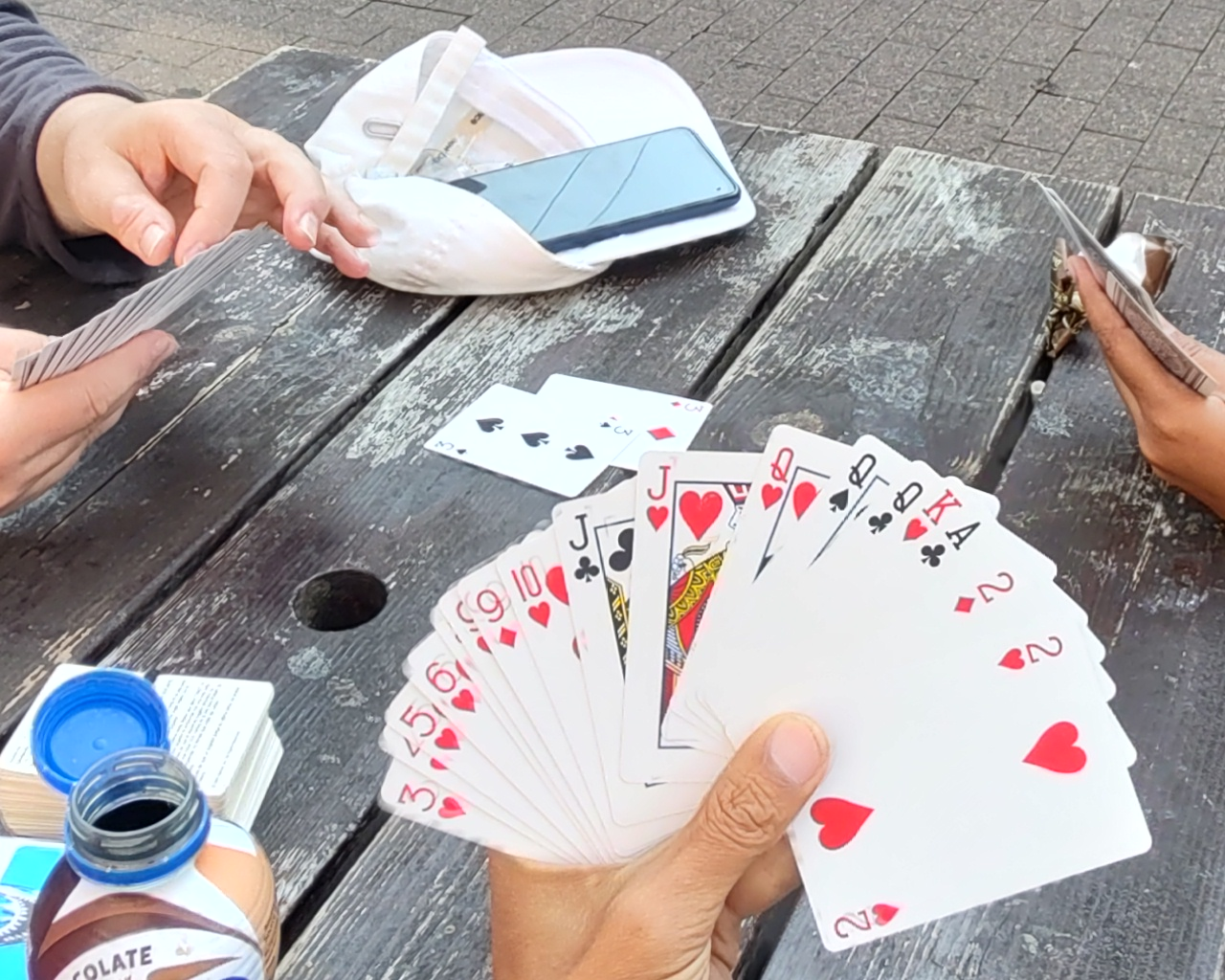
- A 3-player big two game begun with a pair-3
- Origin: Hong Kong
- Alternative names: Big deuce, deuces, top dog, Chinese poker; dà lǎo èr; sho tai ti, chor dai di, co daai di, dai di; cap sa; ciniza, giappuniza; pusoy dos, chikicha, sikitcha, Filipino poker, Mot Hai Ba
- Type: Shedding
- Players: 2–4
- Age range: All
- Cards: 52
- Deck: Standard 52-card deck
- Rank (high→low): 2 A K Q J 10 9 8 7 6 5 4 3 Spades, hearts, clubs, diamonds
- Chance: Moderate

Big two (also known as deuces, capsa, pusoy dos, and dai di, among other names) is a shedding-type card game of Cantonese origin. The game is popular in East Asia and Southeast Asia, especially throughout mainland China, Hong Kong, Vietnam, Macau, Taiwan, Indonesia, the Philippines, Malaysia and Singapore. It is played both casually and as a gambling game.

Big two is usually played with two to four players. It is played with a standard 52-card deck. The objective of the game is to be the first to play off all of one's cards.

== Names ==
Big two has many names, including big deuce and top dog. In Cantonese, it is 鋤大弟 (chor dai di, Jyutping: co^{4} daai^{6} di^{2}). In Hokkien, it is 十三 (cap sa, Pe̍h-ōe-jī: cha̍p-saⁿ, lit. 'thirteen'), a name which is also commonly used in Indonesia. In Malta, it is often referred to as ciniza ("Chinese") or giappuniza ("Japanese"). A variant of the game is called pusoy dos in Filipino and chikicha in other Philippine languages.

== Rules ==
A 52-card deck is shuffled and then dealt out equally to all players, either 13 (for a four-player game) or 17 (for a three-player game). The Joker cards are not used, and if it is a three player game the remaining card is also not used.

A round starts with the player with the lowest ranking card (3♦ or 3♣, depending on player count), who plays it as either a single card or as part of a combination (see § Combinations). Other players proceed to play combinations of a higher rank with the same number of cards. Players may pass their turn if they chose not to play, and must pass if they do not have the required cards to play.

Once all players have passed, all played cards are moved to a waste-pile, and the player with the last discard starts a fresh round by playing any combination of their choice. A match ends once a player has played every single card in their hand. Scores can be tabulated according to the method laid out in § Scoring.

=== Combinations ===
Examples of valid combinations by number of cards. The five-card combinations are ranked from strongest to weakest; their ranks are determined by the fully-visible card.

Cards can be played singly or in groups of 2, 3, or 5.

The value of each card is determined by its rank, with the suit as a tiebreaker. Cards with a rank of 2 has the highest ranking, followed by Aces, all the way until 3. The suits are ranked from highest to lowest: ♠ Spades, ♥ Hearts, ♣ Clubs and ♦ Diamonds. In some versions such as the Taiwanese version, the ranks of ♣ Clubs and ♦ Diamonds are swapped.

Players may choose any combinations to play, with either Singles, Pairs, Triples, or a five-card combination. The five-card combinations are ranked, from lowest to highest:

- Straight (順子): a hand that contains five cards of sequential rank, disregarding suits. If another player discards a straight of the same sequence, the suit for the high card must be higher. Depending on rulesets the sequence with the highest priority and lower priority varies:
  - If the highest ranked combination is 2-3-4-5-6, the next highest sequence is A-K-Q-J-10, while the lowest is A-2-3-4-5.
  - If the highest ranked combination is A-2-3-4-5, the next highest sequence is 2-3-4-5-6, then A-K-Q-J-10, while the lowest is 3-4-5-6-7.
  - If the highest ranked combination is A-K-Q-J-10, the next highest sequence can be either 2-3-4-5-6 or K-Q-J-10-9, while the lowest is either A-2-3-4-5 or 3-4-5-6-7.
  - Note that 2-A-K-Q-J, 3-2-A-K-Q or 4-3-2-A-K are not valid sequences.
- Flush (同花): a hand that contains five cards of the same suit, not in sequence. Note that, unlike all other combinations, the rank of the suit determines the ranking of the flush.
- Full House (葫芦): a hand that contains three cards of one rank and a pair of cards of another rank as tie-breakers. The rank for the triple determines the rank of the full house.
- Four-of-a-Kind (四条): a hand that contains four cards of one rank and one card of another rank. The rank for the quad determines the rank of the four-of-a-kind.
- Straight flush (同花順): a hand that contains five cards of sequential rank and in the same suit.

In some rulesets, if one player receives a dragon (一条龙), which comprises all 13 cards of each rank without any duplicates, the player immediately wins the match. If multiple players have a dragon, the following tiebreaker will apply:

- If a player has a dragon with all the cards of the same suit, that player wins.
- If the above does not occur, the player with the lowest ranking card (i.e. three of diamonds or three of clubs) wins.

=== Scoring ===
Scores can be used to pay the winner if big two is played as a gambling game. Points are calculated based on the number of cards remaining for each player, with that score being doubled for the following cases:

- If the player has 10 or more cards;
- If the player has an unused two;
- If the player has an unused Four-of-a-Kind or straight flush (an unused four-of-a-kind of twos is not applicable for the increase);
- If the winning player's last discard is either a two, a Four-of-a-Kind or a Straight Flush, or instantly wins with a Dragon.

Usually, more matches are played until a player receives 50 points or more in total, at which point the player with the lowest score wins the game.

== See also ==
- Chinese poker
- Dou di zhu (similar rules, played with three players)
- Tiến lên (a similar Vietnamese game)
- Gnau
- Zi pai
- Four color cards
- Daguai luzi, also known as wild escape or the joker's way
- Balatro (video game)
