= Gnau =

Malaysian card game

Gnau (also Ngau, or Ngao in British Chinese; lit. 'ox') is a card game that originated in Malaysia which uses one or more standard 52-card decks of French-suited playing cards. It can be played casually or as a gambling game with at least two players; as each player is dealt five cards with no discards or redraws, it can be played with up to as many players as the number of cards allows.

== Gameplay ==
=== Preparation ===
The game uses a standard 52-card deck, with thirteen cards in four suits. Extra decks may be used if more than 10 players are playing. One player volunteers to be the dealer. The dealer then shuffles the cards and distributes them in a clockwise or counterclockwise manner to all players, including the dealer; each player receives 5 cards for their hand. The extra cards are put aside.

=== Scoring eligibility ===
"Ox point" values
| Name | Cards | | | | Value |
|---|---|---|---|---|---|
| Ace | Ace of Clubs | Ace of Diamonds | Ace of Hearts | Ace of Spades | 1 |
| 2 | 2 of Clubs | 2 of Diamonds | 2 of Hearts | 2 of Spades | 2 |
| 3 | 3 of Clubs | 3 of Diamonds | 3 of Hearts | 3 of Spades | 3 or 6 |
| 4 | 4 of Clubs | 4 of Diamonds | 4 of Hearts | 4 of Spades | 4 |
| 5 | 5 of Clubs | 5 of Diamonds | 5 of Hearts | 5 of Spades | 5 |
| 6 | 6 of Clubs | 6 of Diamonds | 6 of Hearts | 6 of Spades | 3 or 6 |
| 7 | 7 of Clubs | 7 of Diamonds | 7 of Hearts | 7 of Spades | 7 |
| 8 | 8 of Clubs | 8 of Diamonds | 8 of Hearts | 8 of Spades | 8 |
| 9 | 9 of Clubs | 9 of Diamonds | 9 of Hearts | 9 of Spades | 9 |
| 10 | 10 of Clubs | 10 of Diamonds | 10 of Hearts | 10 of Spades | 10 |
| J | Jack of Clubs | Jack of Diamonds | Jack of Hearts | Jack of Spades | 10 |
| Q | Queen of Clubs | Queen of Diamonds | Queen of Hearts | Queen of Spades | 10 |
| K | King of Clubs | King of Diamonds | King of Hearts | King of Spades | 10 |

Each card carries an "Ox point" value generally equal to its face value, with the exception of 3 and 6 (which can score either 3 or 6) and the face cards, which each score 10.

A player is "enabled" for scoring by identifying three (of the five) cards in their hand for which either:

- The sum of those cards' Ox points is a multiple of 10 (e.g., 10, 20, or 30)
- There are three cards with identical values (i.e., three-of-a-kind such as 7-7-7)

Either of these conditions makes that player "scoring eligible" (開局; hoi1 guk6); these three cards are sometimes called the player's "ox" or "passport". To compute the sum of the "ox" or "passport", Baccarat point values may be used as an alternative methodology, with the exception of the 3 and 6; the goal is to have a sum of 0 (modulo 10). The two remaining cards are used to determine the player's "Ox power" (score).

Because the 3 and 6 can score either 3 or 6 Ox points, there may be more than one way to become eligible from the three cards. The player should choose the way that makes the most powerful Ox with the two remaining cards.

=== Ox power ===
The highest Ox power is assigned to the case where all five cards in the player's hand are face cards, i.e., J, Q, or K; in some cases, 10 is considered a face card as it has the same point value. This condition is called "All-Big" or "Five Dukes".

Similarly, if all five cards are low-Ox-value (A, 2, 3, or 4), this condition is called "All-Small" and ranks second only to the Five Dukes hand.

Ox power is determined by the two remaining cards in most other cases. If one of the two remaining cards is the Ace of spades and the other one is a face card, this is another highly-ranked special situation, called a "Ngau Tonku". On the other hand, if the ace is anything other than spades, this situation is called "Nenku" and the ace is scored normally, with one point.

If the two remaining cards have matching face values, these are considered "Double-Ox" and are ranked according to the value of one card. That is, a Double-Ox 8 (pair of 8s) outranks a Double-Ox 7 (pair of 7s). According to some house rules, the variable scoring on the 3 and 6 can be used to form a Double-Ox with mismatched face values (e.g., a 3 and a 6).

If the two remaining cards are not a pair, the remainder of their sum, when divided by 10, gives the "Single-Ox" strength. For example, if the player has an 8 and a 5 as their two remaining cards, they have a Single-Ox 3 (8 + 5 = 13, which gives remainder 3 after division by 10). A Single-Ox 0 is the strongest possible Single-Ox, followed by Single-Ox 9, 8, etc.

Finally, if the player is unable to form an ox or passport, they have a "No Ox" situation.

Ox power, from highest to lowest
| Name | Hand points | Example | | | | | Condition |
|---|---|---|---|---|---|---|---|
| Five Dukes | 10 | King of Diamonds | Jack of Hearts | 10 of Spades | Jack of Diamonds | Queen of Clubs | All five cards are "Duke" face cards; (Note: In some variants, the 10 is counted as a "Duke") any three cards can be selected to make the player eligible for scoring, and the other two cards will sum to 20. |
| Five Dukes | 10 | 10 | 10 | 10 | 10 | 10 | All five cards are "Duke" face cards; any three cards can be selected to make the player eligible for scoring, and the other two cards will sum to 20. |
| Five Small | 10 | 3 of Diamonds | 4 of Clubs | 3 of Spades | Ace of Spades | Two of Clubs | The player's hand contains only A, 2, 3, 4. |
| Five Small | 10 | 3 | 4 | 3 | 1 | 2 | The player's hand contains only A, 2, 3, 4. |
| Ngau Tonku | 5 | King of Diamonds | 4 of Clubs | 3 of Spades | Ace of Spades | Queen of Clubs | The remaining cards for "Ox strength" are the Ace of spades and a "Duke" face card (J, Q, or K). |
| Ngau Tonku | 5 | 10 | 4 | 6 | 1 | 10 | The remaining cards for "Ox strength" are the Ace of spades and a "Duke" face card (J, Q, or K). |
| Nenku | X | King of Diamonds | 4 of Clubs | 3 of Spades | Ace of Diamonds | Queen of Clubs | The remaining cards for "Ox strength" are an Ace (not the Ace of Spades) and a "Duke" face card (J, Q, or K). |
| Nenku | X | 10 | 4 | 6 | 1 | 10 | The remaining cards for "Ox strength" are an Ace (not the Ace of Spades) and a "Duke" face card (J, Q, or K). |
| Double- Ox | 2 | King of Diamonds | 4 of Clubs | 3 of Spades | 8 of Diamonds | 8 of Clubs | The remaining cards for "Ox strength" have a matching face value (not Ox point value). The face value of the pair gives the relative strength compared to another Double-Ox; the example shown is a Double-Ox 8. |
| Double- Ox | 2 | 10 | 4 | 6 | 8 | 8 | The remaining cards for "Ox strength" have a matching face value (not Ox point value). The face value of the pair gives the relative strength compared to another Double-Ox; the example shown is a Double-Ox 8. |
| Single- Ox | 1 | King of Diamonds | 4 of Clubs | 3 of Spades | 8 of Diamonds | 5 of Diamonds | The remaining cards for "Ox strength" do not have a matching face value. The sum of the Ox points of the pair gives the relative strength compared to another Single-Ox; the example shown is a Single-Ox 3 (8 + 5 = 13; the strength is the ones digit). (Note: House rules may include a double payout for same-suit cards.) |
| Single- Ox | 1 | 10 | 4 | 6 | 8 | 5 | The remaining cards for "Ox strength" do not have a matching face value. The sum of the Ox points of the pair gives the relative strength compared to another Single-Ox; the example shown is a Single-Ox 3 (8 + 5 = 13; the strength is the ones digit). |
| No Ox | 0 | 4 of Diamonds | 4 of Clubs | 3 of Spades | 8 of Diamonds | 5 of Diamonds | Player is unable to become scoring-eligible, that is no 3 cards sum up to a multiple of 10. |
| No Ox | 0 | 4 | 4 | 3 or 6 | 8 | 5 | Player is unable to become scoring-eligible, that is no 3 cards sum up to a multiple of 10. |

=== Hierarchy of Oxen ===
- 5 Dukes
- Ngau Ton Ku (Ace Spade + Duke)
- Double-Ox K
- Double-Ox Q
- Double-Ox J
- Double-Ox 10
- Double-Ox 9
- Double-Ox 8
- Double-Ox 7
- Double-Ox 6 (3 can be changed to 6 & can be inter-paired, if designated)
- Double-Ox 5
- Double-Ox 4
- Double-Ox 3 (3 can be changed to 6 & can be inter-paired, if designated)
- Double-Ox 2
- Double-Ox Ace
- Ox of 9
- Ox of 8
- Ox of 7
- Ox of 6
- Ox of 5
- Ox of 4
- Ox of 3
- Ox of 2
- Ox of 1
- PS1:- Note that a Duke can be designated to include 10 or picture only card.
- PS2:- Note that house rule may allow suited OX to have a double payout.

=== Payout ===
- 5 Dukes = 7 times
- Ngau Ton Ku = 5 times
- Double-Ox = 3 times
- Standard Ox = 1 time

== Scoring ==
- No Ox: 0 pt.
- Ordinary Ox: 1 pt.
- Double Ox: 2 pts.
- Ngau Tonku : 5 pts (triple pay)
- Five Dukes: 10 pts.

The players play with the dealer and not among each other. So if your Ox cannot beat the dealer's Ox, the dealer will deduct the number of pts the dealer's Ox worths from you and add to his/her total. Vice-Versa. If both own Five Dukes, it's a tie.

=== Examples ===
==== Ox formation alternatives ====
For example, if the hand has face values 3,6,8,4,8, there are three ways to form an Ox:

1. 3(counted as 6) + 6 + 8 = 20; strength is 4 + 8 = Single-Ox 2 (take remainder)
2. 3 + 6(counted as 3) + 4 = 10; strength is 8 + 8 = Double-Ox 8
3. 8 + 4 + 8 = 20; strength is 3 + 6 = Single-Ox 9 (note this also could be 3+3 or 6+6 because of the interchangeability of the 3 and 6, but both of these combinations give lower strength scores)

The strongest Ox in this case is the Double-Ox 8, followed by the Single-Ox 9, then the Single-Ox 2.

Example 1
| | | Cards | | | | | |
| Draw | | 3 of Clubs | 6 of Spades | 8 of Hearts | 4 of Hearts | 8 of Clubs | |
| a: Single-Ox 2 | Ox | 3 of Clubs | 6 of Spades | 8 of Hearts | 4 of Hearts | 8 of Clubs | Strength |
| a: Single-Ox 2 | 20 (6+6+8) | 6 | 6 | 8 | 4 | 8 | 2 (4+8) |
| b: Double-Ox 8 | Ox | 3 of Clubs | 6 of Spades | 8 of Hearts | 4 of Hearts | 8 of Clubs | Strength |
| b: Double-Ox 8 | 10 (3+3+4) | 3 | 3 | 8 | 4 | 8 | Double-Ox Eight (8+8) |
| c: Single-Ox 9 | Ox | 3 of Clubs | 6 of Spades | 8 of Hearts | 4 of Hearts | 8 of Clubs | Strength |
| c: Single-Ox 9 | 20 (8+4+8) | 3 | 6 | 8 | 4 | 8 | 9 (3+6) |

==== Increasing strength ====
Sample hands and scoring
| Type | Ox | Cards | | | | | Strength | Notes |
|---|---|---|---|---|---|---|---|---|
| No Ox | — | 10 of Clubs | 9 of Spades | 8 of Hearts | 4 of Hearts | 4 of Clubs | — | No ox can be formed with any three-card subset from this combination of cards: 10+9+8, 10+9+4, 10+8+4, 10+4+4, 9+8+4, 9+4+4, 8+4+4. |
| No Ox | — | 10 | 9 | 8 | 4 | 4 | — | No ox can be formed with any three-card subset from this combination of cards: 10+9+8, 10+9+4, 10+8+4, 10+4+4, 9+8+4, 9+4+4, 8+4+4. |
| Single-Ox 1 | 20 (10+9+1) | 10 of Clubs | 9 of Spades | 8 of Hearts | 7 of Hearts | 4 of Clubs | 1 (7+4) | |
| Single-Ox 1 | 20 (10+9+1) | 10 | 9 | 1 | 7 | 4 | 1 (7+4) | |
| Single-Ox 2 | 20 (10+9+1) | 10 of Clubs | 9 of Spades | 8 of Hearts | 2 of Hearts | 10 of Clubs | 2 (2+10) | |
| Single-Ox 2 | 20 (10+9+1) | 10 | 9 | 1 | 2 | 10 | 2 (2+10) | |
| Single-Ox 3 | 20 (10+8+2) | Jack of Clubs | 8 of Spades | 2 of Hearts | 8 of Hearts | 5 of Clubs | 3 (8+5) | |
| Single-Ox 3 | 20 (10+8+2) | 10 | 8 | 2 | 8 | 5 | 3 (8+5) | |
| Single-Ox 4 | 30 (10+10+10) | 10 of Clubs | 10 of Spades | 10 of Hearts | 9 of Hearts | 5 of Clubs | 4 (9+5) | |
| Single-Ox 4 | 30 (10+10+10) | 10 | 10 | 10 | 9 | 5 | 4 (9+5) | |
| Single-Ox 5 | 20 (10+8+2) | King of Clubs | 8 of Spades | 2 of Hearts | 9 of Hearts | 6 of Clubs | 5 (9+6) | This could be scored as Single-Ox 2 if the alternative value of 3 for the 6 is used. As another alternative, the Ox could be formed as 9-8-3, again giving Single-Ox 2 (10+2). Both of these are weaker than Single-Ox 5. |
| Single-Ox 5 | 20 (10+8+2) | 10 | 8 | 2 | 9 | 6 (or 3) | 5 (9+6) | This could be scored as Single-Ox 2 if the alternative value of 3 for the 6 is used. As another alternative, the Ox could be formed as 9-8-3, again giving Single-Ox 2 (10+2). Both of these are weaker than Single-Ox 5. |
| Single-Ox 6 | 20 (10+6+4) | 10 of Clubs | 6 of Spades | 4 of Hearts | 9 of Hearts | 7 of Clubs | 6 (9+7) | If the alternate value of 3 is used for the 6, the Ox could be formed as 10-3-7 with a result of Single-Ox 3 (4+9). Single-Ox 6 is a stronger hand. |
| Single-Ox 6 | 20 (10+6+4) | 10 | 6 (or 3) | 4 | 9 | 7 | 6 (9+7) | If the alternate value of 3 is used for the 6, the Ox could be formed as 10-3-7 with a result of Single-Ox 3 (4+9). Single-Ox 6 is a stronger hand. |
| Single-Ox 7 | 20 (10+7+3) | King of Clubs | 7 of Spades | 3 of Hearts | Jack of Hearts | 7 of Clubs | 7 (10+7) | If the alternate value of 6 is used for the 3, the Ox could be formed as 7-6-7 with a resulting strength of Single-Ox 0 (10+10), which would be a stronger hand. |
| Single-Ox 7 | 20 (10+7+3) | 10 | 7 | 3 (or 6) | 10 | 7 | 7 (10+7) | If the alternate value of 6 is used for the 3, the Ox could be formed as 7-6-7 with a resulting strength of Single-Ox 0 (10+10), which would be a stronger hand. |
| Single-Ox 8 | 30 (10+10+10) | King of Clubs | Queen of Spades | Jack of Hearts | 7 of Hearts | Ace of Clubs | 8 (7+1) | |
| Single-Ox 8 | 30 (10+10+10) | 10 | 10 | 10 | 7 | 1 | 8 (7+1) | |
| Single-Ox 9 | 10 (7+1+2) | 7 of Clubs | Ace of Spades | 2 of Hearts | 3 of Hearts | 6 of Clubs | 9 (3+6) | Single-Ox 9 yields the highest value; under some house rules, the 3 and 6 could be considered as a pair and assigned a Double-Ox 6. |
| Single-Ox 9 | 10 (7+1+2) | 7 | 1 | 2 | 3 (or 6) | 6 (or 3) | 9 (3+6) | Single-Ox 9 yields the highest value; under some house rules, the 3 and 6 could be considered as a pair and assigned a Double-Ox 6. |
| Single-Ox 0 | 30 (10+10+10) | King of Clubs | Queen of Spades | 10 of Hearts | 9 of Hearts | Ace of Clubs | 0 (9+1) | |
| Single-Ox 0 | 30 (10+10+10) | 10 | 10 | 10 | 9 | 1 | 0 (9+1) | |
| Double-Ox 9 | 20 (6+4+10) | 6 of Clubs | 4 of Spades | Jack of Hearts | 9 of Hearts | 9 of Clubs | Double 9 (9+9) | No ox can be formed if the 6 is considered with its alternate value of 3. |
| Double-Ox 9 | 20 (6+4+10) | 6 (or 3) | 4 | 10 | 9 | 9 | Double 9 (9+9) | No ox can be formed if the 6 is considered with its alternate value of 3. |
| Five Dukes | 30 (10+10+10) | 6 of Clubs | 4 of Spades | Jack of Hearts | 9 of Hearts | 9 of Clubs | Five Dukes (10+10) | |
| Five Dukes | 30 (10+10+10) | 10 | 10 | 10 | 10 | 10 | Five Dukes (10+10) | |

The origins of Gnau can be traced back to the early months of 2010 and history has it that it was created by the early grandmasters by the name of Lee Han Ping.

== See also ==
- Zi pai
- Bashi Fen
- Four Color Cards
