= Four color cards =

East Asian card game

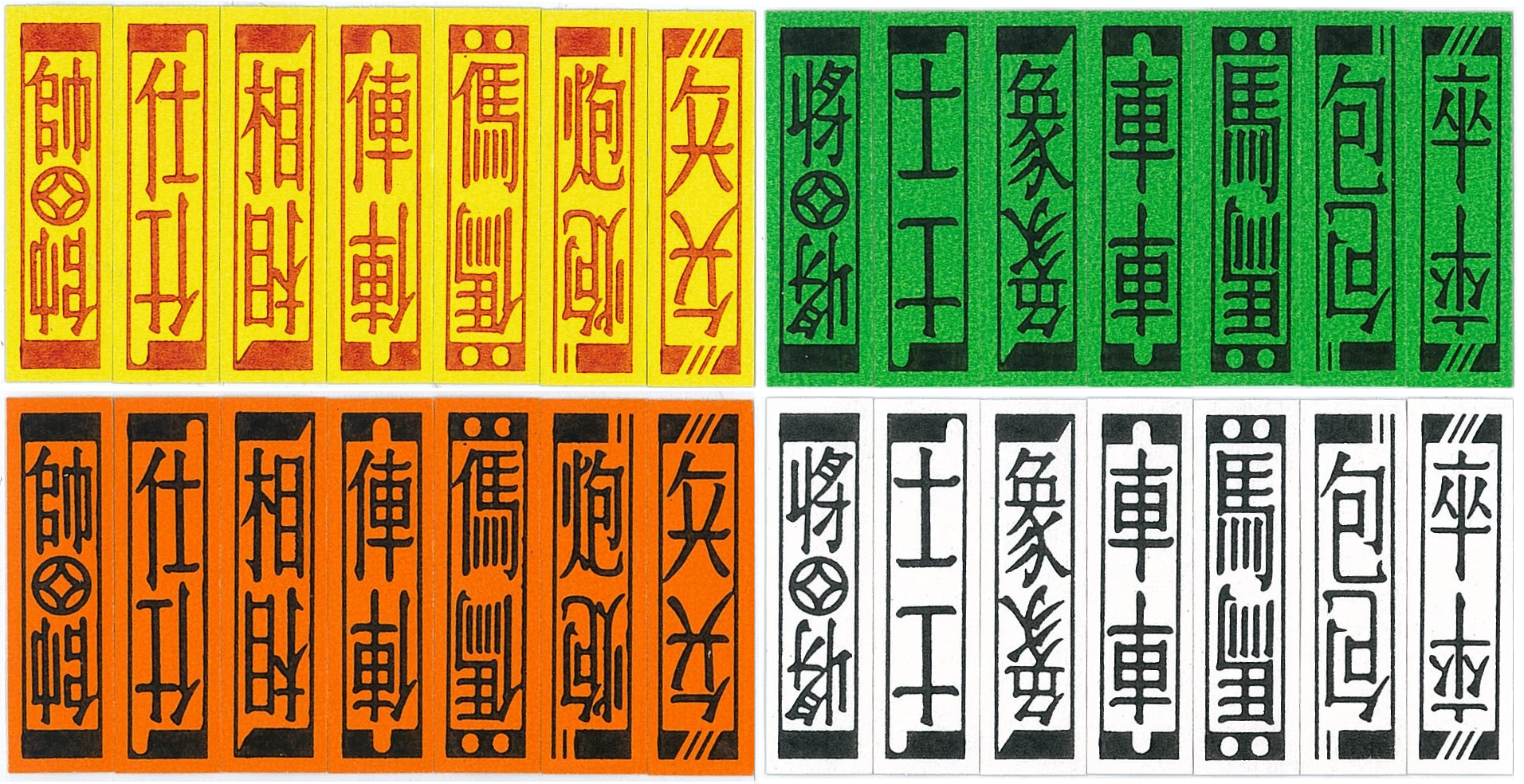
- Four color cards in Taiwan
- Origin: Chinese
- Type: Matching
- Players: 4 (with variations for 2-3 players with a standard deck)
- Skills: Memory, counting
- Cards: 112
- Deck: 4 Color Chinese chess cards set
- Play: Anticlockwise
- Playing time: 20 minutes
- Chance: Low

Related games
- Conquian

Four color cards

Chinese name
- Chinese: 四色牌
Transcriptions
Standard Mandarin
- Hanyu Pinyin: sì sè pái
- IPA: sɨ̂ sɤ̂ pʰǎɪ
Yue: Cantonese
- Yale Romanization: sei3 sik1 paai4
- Jyutping: sei3 sik1 paai4
- IPA: sēi sɪ́k pʰa̬ːi
Eastern Min
- Fuzhou BUC: sé-sáik-bà̤
Pu-Xian Min
- Hinghwa BUC: si̍-seh

Vietnamese name
- Vietnamese alphabet: bài Tứ sắc bài Bốn lá
- Chữ Hán: 排四色
- Chữ Nôm: 排𦊚蘿

Four color cards (Chinese: 四色牌; pinyin: Sì Sè Pái) is a game of the rummy family of card games, with a relatively long history in southern China. In Vietnam the equivalent game is known as tứ sắc (Sino-Vietnamese pronunciation of 四色).

== History ==
The game is similar to various Chinese draw-and-discard card games played since the 18th century. The deck for this particular game originated in the 19th century based on Xiangqi pieces on which the names of said pieces are printed on the cards.

Chess cards clearly are more recent than money-suited and domino Chinese playing cards. Classical Chinese encyclopedias seem to ignore them. Stewart Culin observes: “These [cards derived from Tseung k'i=Xiangqi] seem to be peculiar to the Southern and Southeastern provinces, notably Fuhkien [Fujian] and Kwangtung [Guangdong].” It was also confirmed by the German sinologist Karl Himly, who said these chess cards were specific to Fujian. Indeed, all recorded games come from southeastern China, and chess cards seem particularly linked to Hokkien speakers.

The cards were typically used by the lower class to play gambling games, and were intended to be easy and cheap to make because, as gambling was illegal in China, there was a need for cards that could be easily hidden or disposed of. The cards might have appeared after the ban on playing cards in the Great Qing Legal Code of 1740. Due to the Chinese Communist Revolution and the fact that the game was typically enjoyed by lower classes, written rules for the game were difficult to find. Therefore, the rules may vary depending on the region and household.

== Deck ==
A standard deck consists of 112 cards (or tiles), divided into four color suits, each with 28 cards. The cards are printed with one of characters from the seven Chinese chess pieces; each character is repeated four times within a suit, similar to Mahjong.

Some sets include five Joker cards. Designs may vary; the center of the cards may be printed with decorations, which do not affect gameplay.

There are slight regional variations in the characters used for the cards. In many sets, the red and orange/yellow suit will follow the character conventions used for red Xiangqi pieces, while the white and green/blue suit will follow the character conventions used for black Xiangqi pieces. In Hong Kong sets, a common set of characters adopted from both black and red Xiangqi pieces is used for all four suits.

Regional variations in playing pieces

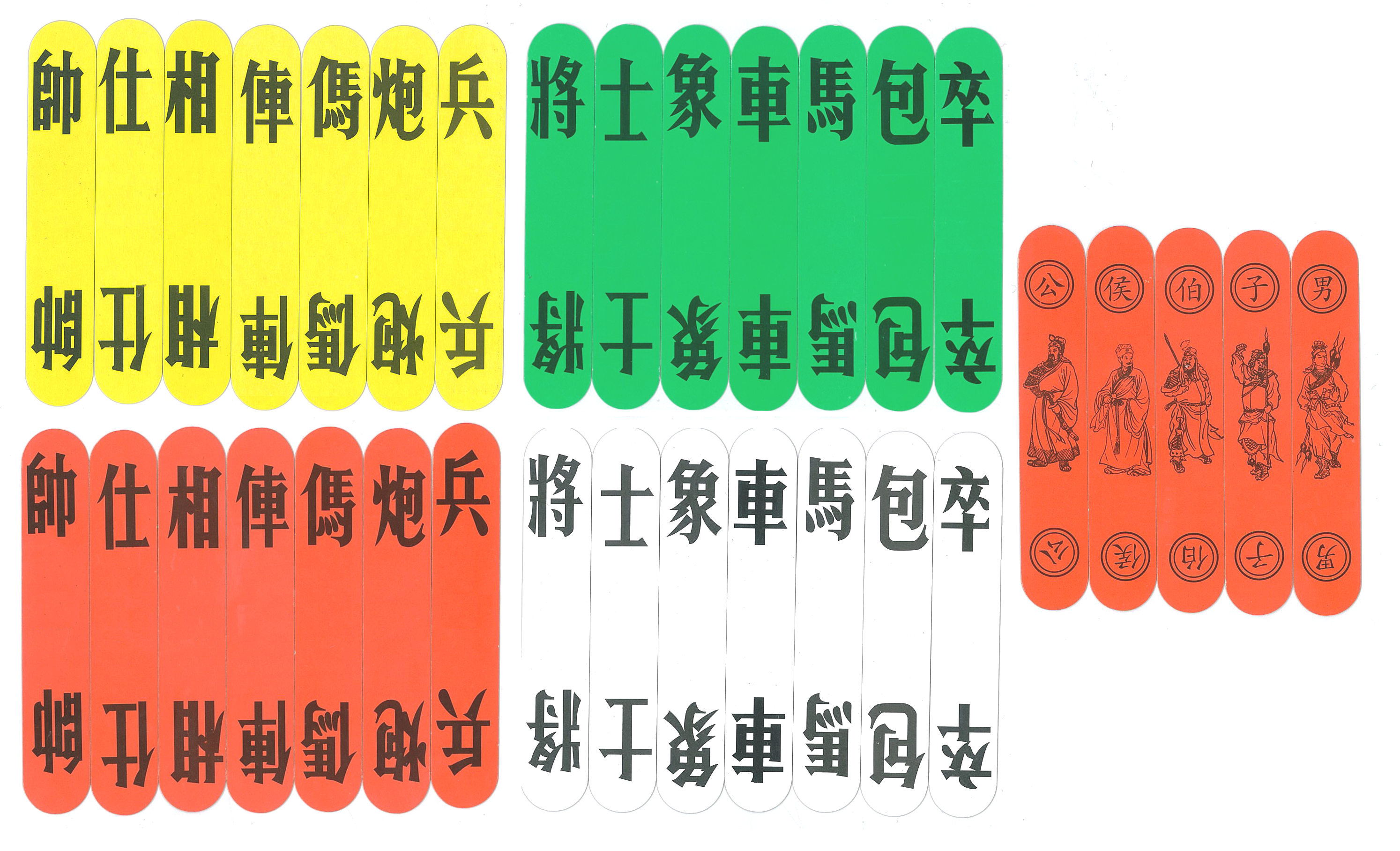
Four color cards in Fuzhou, using the traditional Xiangqi variant characters for the Red/Yellow and Black/Green suits

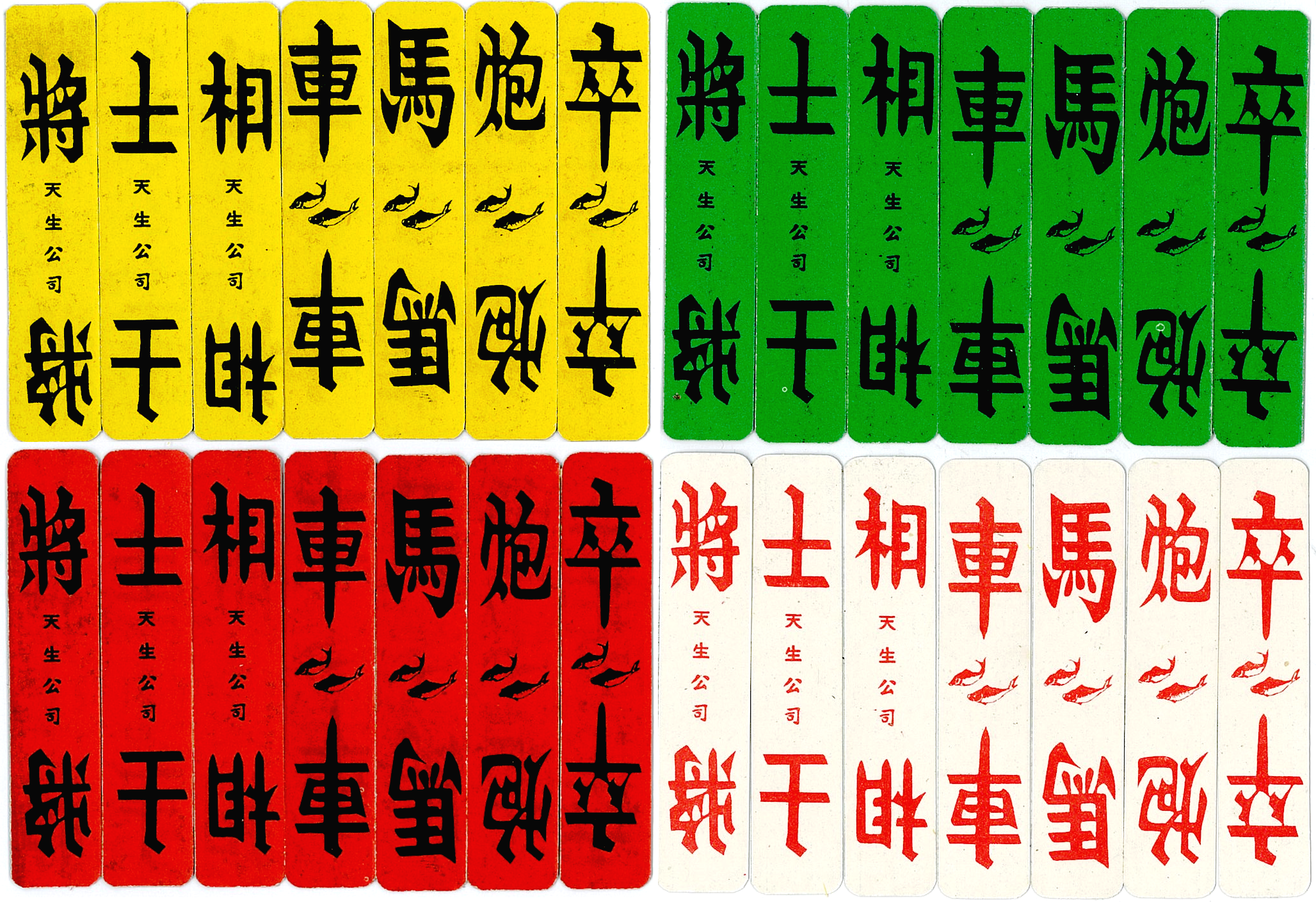
Four color cards in Hong Kong, using a common set of characters for all four suits

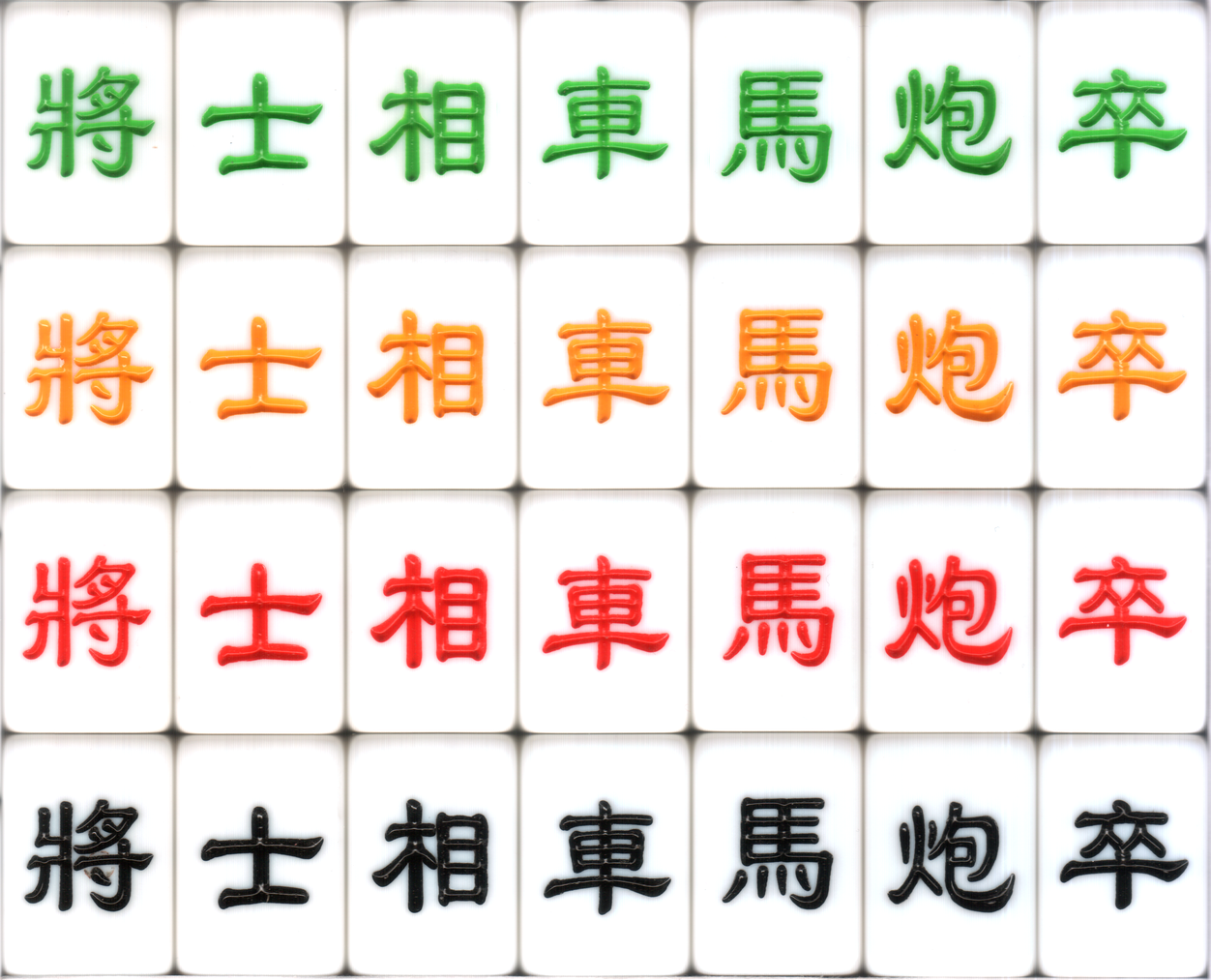
Tile version from Hong Kong, using a common set of characters for all four suits

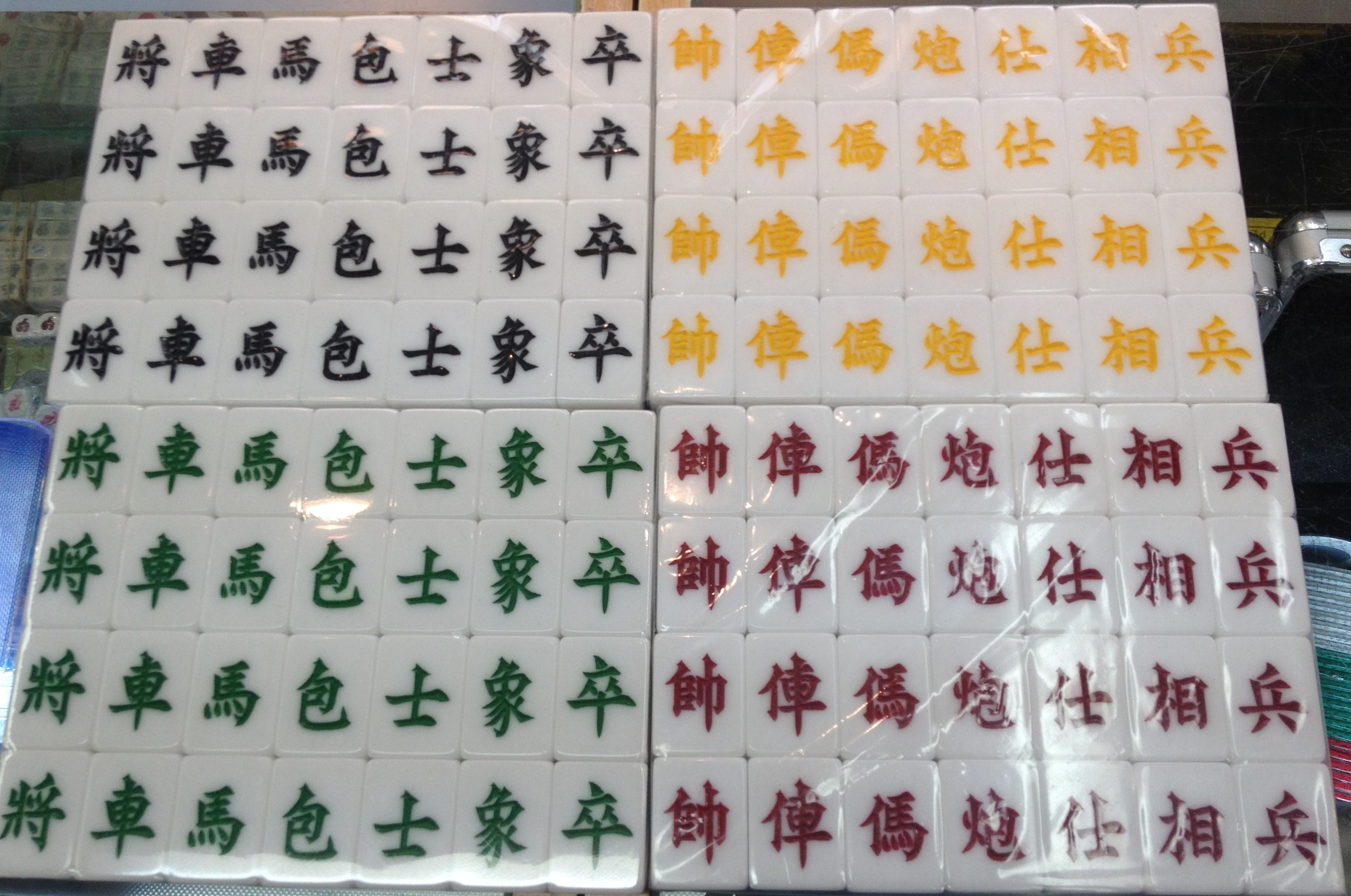
Tile version from Singapore, using the traditional Red/Yellow and Black/Green character variations

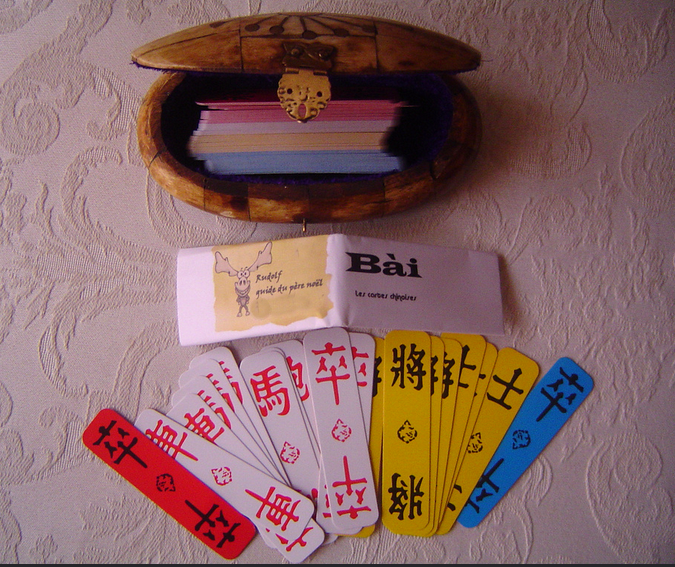
Vietnamese set, with blue replacing the green suit; this also uses the common character set

Four Color Cards suits and cards/tiles
Rank (Abbr.)	Character convention		Suits (Abbrev.)				Hong Kong (common characters)
Rank (Abbr.)	Red	Black	Red (r)	Orange/ Yellow (y)	Black/ White (w)	Green/ Blue (g)	Hong Kong (common characters)
General (K)	帥 shuài	將 jiàng					
General (K)	帥 shuài	將 jiàng	Kr	Ky	Kw	Kg	
Advisor (A)	仕 shì	士 shì					
Advisor (A)	仕 shì	士 shì	Ar	Ay	Aw	Ag	
Elephant (E)	相 xiàng	象 xiàng					
Elephant (E)	相 xiàng	象 xiàng	Er	Ey	Ew	Eg	
Chariot (R)	俥 jū	車 jū					
Chariot (R)	俥 jū	車 jū	Rr	Ry	Rw	Rg	
Horseman (H)	傌 mǎ	馬 mǎ					
Horseman (H)	傌 mǎ	馬 mǎ	Hr	Hy	Hw	Hg	
Cannon (C)	炮 or 砲, pào	包 pào					
Cannon (C)	炮 or 砲, pào	包 pào	Cr	Cy	Cw	Cg	
Soldier (P)	兵 bīng	卒 zú					
Soldier (P)	兵 bīng	卒 zú	Pr	Py	Pw	Pg	

== Objective ==
The objective of this game is very similar to mahjong, which is to achieve a winning hand consisting of multiple melds, as detailed below. Each player has 20 cards at the start of the game, and a winning hand has 21 cards. Each winning hand must have an odd number of points, which can be used as a rough guide for players to check in case they are short of cards or have extra cards.

== Gameplay ==
=== Initial setup ===
The standard variation of the game is played by four players, although it can be played with two or three. If there are more than four players, an extra card set is added for each additional player. For example, for five players, one deck (112 cards) would be supplemented by an extra card set (28 cards), for 140 cards in total.

For the first game, a dealer is chosen by an arbitrary method. A typical method is for everyone to draw randomly one card from a face down pile to compare ranks, with the highest rank being the dealer. For subsequent games, the winner of the previous game will be the dealer, and the player across from the winner will do the job of shuffling cards to set up the draw pile.

The dealer is in charge of handing out cards. Typically, they would take six cards first, then go counterclockwise around the table, giving five cards at a time to each player until they each have a hand of 20 cards (or 21 in the dealer's case). The dealer has an extra card because they must begin play by throwing out the first card.

The remaining cards are collected and placed in a stack at a central location and becomes the Draw Pile. Future draws are always taken from the top of the Draw Pile, if playing with cards.

Typically, a player holds their cards facing them, arranged in a fan and concealed from the other players. Inexperienced players and children may be allowed to put their cards face down on the table. For example, some players could take melds that were created by the initial deal, which they do not plan to touch, and put them in one big facedown stack next to them.

==== Initial melding ====
If a player was dealt a Quadruple meld (four cards of the same color and rank) in their initial hand, they must reveal the quadruple. If a player is in possession of a Triple meld in their starting hand (three cards of the same color and rank), they must indicate it with a marker but are not required to reveal the triple. Common markers are stones or coins. According to some rules, when a player is dealt a triple in their initial hand, they may not split the triple during play (i.e., use one or two cards from the dealt triple to meld with a taken card).

==== Reshuffling (declaring a Mulligan) ====
A player who does not have at least one of the following melds is deemed to have a very weak hand. They are entitled to declare a Mulligan, making the current round void, and a new round begins with a new deal of cards.

- One-card General meld (1 point)
- Three-card Triple meld (3 points)
- Four-card Quadruple meld (8 points)
- Four-card Complete Color Group meld (4 points)

=== Tile-based variations ===
For the version of the game using tiles, shuffling, the initial draw, and the Draw Pile are built in a manner similar to Mahjong. All players participate in shuffling the tiles together, then building them into 4 walls of 28 face-down tiles each, stacked in twos. The dealer starts by taking 4 tiles initially from one of the walls, then the players proceed in anti-clockwise order by taking 4 tiles each from where the previous player left off; after each player has 20 tiles, the dealer takes one more tile as they must discard a tile to start play.

The Draw Pile of tiles continues from the point where the initial draw ended.

=== Turns ===
Most turns consist of taking a card, then melding (if possible), then discarding one card so that each player maintains 20 cards in their hand, unless they have taken the card they need to win, in which case the round ends.

As noted earlier, the dealer starts with 21 cards, so they start play by discarding one of the cards in their hand. Each player maintains their own Discard Pile, positioned on their right so the following player (in anti-clockwise order) can take the discarded card in their turn from the prior player, if desired.

==== Taking ====
Each player after the dealer's initial discard starts off their turn by taking a new card in one of three ways:

1. Eating the card discarded by the player who completed the previous turn. If the card taken was discarded by the previous player, it must be used right away in a meld.
2. Drawing a new card by turning over the top card of the Draw Pile to show it to the other players at the table, then taking it.
3. Stealing a card, meaning to take a card that was just exposed by a draw or a discard by a player out of the normal anti-clockwise sequence. Stealing a card is possible only when certain conditions are met, as detailed in § Stealing.

In general, if the card that was discarded by the previous player to end their turn is not needed by the following player for a meld, that following player will draw a new card instead. Regardless of the method in which the card is taken, it is moved into the player's display area and remains face-up for the rest of the game.

==== Melding ====
After the taken card is moved, face-up, into the display area, the player may expose cards from their hand to form a meld with the card that was just taken. They may bring out from zero to three cards, as long as exactly one meld is created that includes the card that was just taken. The player cannot use cards that are not in their hand to meld. Specifically, they cannot use cards from exposed melds that are already face-up in the display area, but they can break up or use hidden melds in their hand.

The newly created meld is left exposed (face-up) on the table alongside previously created melds.

Winning condition: If, after a meld, a player's hand (all the concealed cards held by the player) consists completely of melds or is empty, the player can declare that they have won, and expose the remaining cards in their hand to demonstrate all of their exposed and concealed cards are part of a meld. The current game is then over and the hand is scored.

==== Discarding ====
After the meld is created, whether from an eaten discarded card or a drawn card, the player may then discard any card they wish from their hand. It is laid face-up on their right hand side so that all players can see it. This becomes that player's discard pile.

If the player decided not to or was unable to meld a drawn card, they must discard the draw. Again, a discard would not be eaten unless it can be made into a meld, so any single card is only discarded once during gameplay.

In practice, Generals are never discarded, because an individual General is a one-card meld that gives 1 point. It is reasonable to impose a rule that Generals cannot be discarded.

If, after a discard, a player's hand consists completely of melds or is empty, the player has NOT won, since they have only 20 cards. That player still needs another meld to win.

After the Discard, the next player sitting to the right of the previous player begins their turn. Subsequent turns continue to proceed anti-clockwise around the table.

This is the basic sequence of play, which continues until one player wins.

==== Stealing ====
A card-stealing mechanic can disrupt the normal anti-clockwise sequence of turns: specifically, at any time, any player may steal a card that was just exposed through a draw or discard even if it is not the stealing player's turn, provided certain conditions are met.

The turn immediately shifts to the player who had stolen the card, who then treats the situation as if they had just taken a card: they are required to meld the stolen card and then complete their turn by discarding a card from their hand. Melds formed with stolen cards must be exposed and displayed face up on the table, as with any other meld formed during gameplay, and the game continues with the stealing player discarding a card. Play then proceeds to the right of that stealing player, as normal. As a consequence of this, players in between may lose their turn, and the player who drew a card may even lose the chance to meld their own draw.

Multiple players may have a reason to steal the same card that was just exposed by a draw or discard. When this occurs, a lower numbered situation takes priority over a higher numbered one:

1. The highest priority goes to a person who would win by stealing the card. They should meld with the card, announce that they have won out loud, and display their cards to count points and verify the win.
  1. If multiple players can steal the card for the win, the player whose turn would come first in normal order gets priority. That player must then display their hand to count points and verify the win.
2. The next-highest priority goes to a player who needs the stolen card to complete a Quad or Triple.
  1. If the stolen card is needed to complete a Quad (not a Four-Footman meld), the player announces that they currently possess a Triple and can meld the other person's card.
  2. If the stolen card is needed to finish a Triple (not a Three-Footman meld), the player announces that they currently possess a Double and can meld the other person's card.

A player may not steal a card out-of-sequence for the other melds (the one-card General meld; the three-card Command or Field group melds; or the Triple Color [soldier] or Complete Color [soldier] group melds) unless it is for a win.

This means that a player who draws a General card has to take the card into their Display Area and discard another card from their hand; they are prohibited from discarding the drawn General card. As an exception, if another player has a triple of the said General card in hand and wishes to make a Quad to get more points, the drawn General may be stolen. However, because a General is inherently worth a point on its own, some variations of the rules do not allow stealing a General under any circumstances, even if a player is completing a Quad, unless it is for an immediate win.

=== Etiquette ===
Players are expected to call out drawn cards and discards as soon as they are exposed. It is considered poor etiquette to:

- delay a call just to see what the player will do with a draw.
- refuse a player's priority call on your drawn card, even if you have already melded it—players should meld their drawn cards only after everyone has had a chance to see it, but if they don't, it's their own fault.
- make a call on a draw or discard after the next draw or discard has been made, i.e., no retroactive calls.

== Examples and scoring ==
Melds and scoring
Cards in meld	Name	Scoring		Examples		Notes
Cards in meld	Name	Hidden	Exposed	Valid	Invalid	Notes
1	(General)	1	1	將 or 將 or 將 or 將	N/A	This meld can only be formed using the General card. Thus every General card is a one-card meld by itself unless combining them together to make a Quadruple allows the player to get more points. Every one-card meld scores one point, whether it is exposed or in the player's hand. When Jokers are used, each Joker is a one-card meld. Unlike the General, even if a player holds multiple Jokers, they cannot be combined into larger groups.
2	(Double)	0	0	士 士 or 車 車	相 相	This meld can only be formed with any two identical cards (same character and color). However, this meld scores no points and therefore, two General cards are almost always treated separately as one-card melds to score one point each for a total of two points. For the non-General cards, players often aim to complete a three-card meld by calling "Pong" when a third identical card is drawn by oneself or the opponent. Cards with identical characters, but different colors, cannot be used to form two-card melds.
3	(Command)	1	1	將 士 相 or 將 士 相	將 士 相	This meld consists of a General, Advisor, and Elephant in the same suit (color). This scores one point whether it is exposed or in the player's hand. Thus there is no reason for the General card to be used in this way unless it is to achieve the winning hand quickly and the player has enough points from other melds.
3	(Field)	1	1	車 馬 炮 or 車 馬 炮	車 馬 炮	This meld consists of a Chariot, Horseman, and Cannon in the same suit (color). This scores one point whether it is exposed or in the player's hand.
3	(Triple)	3	1	炮 炮 炮 or 車 車 車	N/A	Analogous to the pong in mahjong, this meld is formed by three identical cards (in both suit and rank). This scores one point when it is exposed and three points when in the player's hand (with the exception of the General card). A triple of the General card scores three points whether it is exposed or in the player's hand (treat each General card as a one-card meld).
3	(Triple color)	1	1	馬 馬 馬 or 士 士 士	N/A	This meld consists of three identical cards in rank but in different colors. It scores one point whether it is exposed or in the player's hand. In some rule variants, the Triple Color group is limited to soldiers only (兵 or 卒).
4	(Quadruple)	8	6	相 相 相 相 or 炮 炮 炮 炮	N/A	Analogous to the kong in mahjong, this meld is formed by four identical cards (in both suit and rank). This scores six points when it is exposed and eight points when in the player's hand. This is the only scenario where the General card should not be treated separately as one-card melds since a quadruple scores more points than the four points of the four one-card melds.
4	(Complete color group)	4	4	車 車 車 車 or 卒 卒 卒 卒	N/A	This meld consists of four identical cards in rank but in different colors. It scores four points whether it is exposed or in the player's hand. In some rule variants, the Complete Color group is limited to soldiers only (兵 or 卒).

Melding examples
Example	Card taken	Card(s) exposed from hand	Meld	Score	Notes
1	Hw	Hw	Double	0	Because the double meld gives zero points and cannot be used for further melding, this meld would be used mainly to capture the last card needed to win.
1	Hw	Hw,Hw	Triple	1	The triple meld can be formed following a steal.
1	Hw	Hw,Hw,Hw	Quad	6	Likewise, the quadruple meld can be formed following a steal.
1	Hw	Cw,Rw	Field	1	However, the field group can only be formed from a discard or a draw, not a steal.
2	Kb	(none)	Single	1	General cards (and Jokers, if they are in play) form single-card melds on their own.
2	Kb	Ab,Eb	Command	1	Although a general card can be stolen to form a triple meld, there is no reason to do so as the triple meld only scores one point, while the three generals, considered individually, score three points. In addition, because each general card scores a point, there is no reason to discard a general, hence the general usually is taken through a draw or stolen draw and if melded with other cards, generally as part of the command group.

== Terminology ==
Concealed
Cards held by the player that are not publicly viewable. This includes any melds that were part of the initial deal. The sum of concealed and exposed cards is 20 for each player during gameplay; a winning player has 21 cards.
Discard
Exposing a card and removing it from the player's hand to maintain a total of 20 cards (both exposed and concealed) to complete that player's turn. A player cannot win after a discard, as a winning player will have 21 cards.
Display Area
The exposed cards held by the player, showing the melds formed during play. The sum of cards exposed in the display area and concealed in the hand is 20 for each player during gameplay; a winning hand has 21 cards.
Drawing
Exposing and taking the card from the Draw Pile. Another player may steal the drawn card from the player that drew it.
Eating
Taking the card that was discarded to complete the prior player's turn. In general, the discard is not eaten unless the player can make a meld. Stealing a card takes precedence over eating.
Exposed
Cards held by the player that are publicly viewable in the display area because they were used in a meld formed during gameplay. The sum of concealed and exposed cards is 20 for each player during gameplay; a winning player has 21 cards.
Hand
All the cards held by a player which are concealed from the other players. In the initial deal, each player receives 20 cards for their hand, except the dealer, who receives 21 cards. The sum of cards exposed in the display area and concealed in the hand is maintained at 20 for each player during gameplay; a winning player has 21 cards.
Meld
A group of one to four cards with specific matching conditions. The points scored by a given meld depends on the type of meld formed, and whether the meld was formed from the initial deal (concealed) or during gameplay (exposed).
Stealing
Taking a drawn or discarded card from another player when it is not the stealing player's normal turn. Specific conditions and priorities must be followed for stealing a card.
Taking
Adding a card to the display area by either eating the prior player's discard, drawing a new card, or stealing a card from another player out-of-sequence. Cards that were eaten or stolen must be melded.
Turn
Each player's turn consists of three phases: taking, melding, and discarding; during normal gameplay, each player will maintain control over 20 cards.

== See also ==
- Gnau
- Zi pai
- Bài Chòi
- Bài Bất / Bài Tổ Tôm
- Bài Tam Cúc
- Mahjong
