= Wild escape =

Chinese card game

- Origin: Shanghai, China
- Alternative names: The joker's way, gaiguai luzi, dà guài lù zi
- Type: Shedding-type
- Players: 6
- Age range: 12 - 60
- Cards: 162 (3 decks including jokers), 27 per person with 6 players
- Deck: Anglo-American
- Rank (high→low): Big joker, small joker, 2 A K Q J 10 9 8 7 6 5 4 3,
- Playing time: 10–15 minutes

Related games
- Big two

Wild escape, also known as daguai luzi (Chinese: 大怪路子; pinyin: dà guài lù zi) or the joker's way is a card game originating in Shanghai, China. It is a team game for 6 players and played with three decks of cards.

== Setup ==
- 6 people are divided into 2 fixed teams. The players sit in alternating order, so no team members are sitting next to each other.
- If this is the first round, the offense leader is determined randomly. Each player draws a random card and the player with the highest card is the offense leader.
- 3 decks of cards are dealt out to all 6 players. Each player has 27 cards. Jokers are used in the game, and there is differentiation between the "big joker" and the "small joker".

== Objective ==
The objective of the game is to score, and increase one's level.

1. Only the offense team can score.
2. The offense team must have the first person to "escape", i.e. play all of his cards.
3. The rest of the offense team must escape, before the defending team escapes. When one team escapes, the remaining team players are "trapped". The more players that are trapped, the higher the "tribute" that is paid to the winning team.

A team wins the round only when they are first to escape, AND their team escapes before the other team. If one of the conditions is not achieved (i.e. one team makes the initial escape, but fails to fully escape before the other team), the round is a draw. If the offense team wins the round, they score and their level advances. The team with the highest level wins the match, and the game is usually played until one team reaches a specific level. The first person to escape becomes the offense leader in the following round.

== Terminology ==
=== Offense leader ===
The first person to play in the round. Only the offense team can score (and raise the level). The first person to escape in a round is the offense leader in the next round.

The offense leader of the first round is decided by a random card draw.

=== Trump card ===
Trump cards are higher than all other cards except jokers. Trump cards are determined by the offense’s team level in each game. The trump cards start the game as the 2s, and can go up to aces, as the offense's team level advances.

=== Escape ===
A player who has played all of the cards in hand has said to have "escaped".

=== Trapped ===
A player is trapped at the end of a round, if still holding cards after all the players on the opposing team have escaped.

== Rules ==
=== Legal hands ===
A player can start a turn by playing:

- 1 card: any single card can be played by itself.
- 2 cards: two cards must be a pair of the same rank (e.g., two 5s).
- 3 cards: three cards must be of the same rank (i.e., three of a kind).
- 5 cards: five cards must be one of the following poker-hand patterns:
  - Straight
  - Flush
  - Full house
  - Four of a kind + any single card
  - Straight flush
  - Five of a kind – a non-poker hand, and only available in multi-deck play

=== Rank of cards and hands ===
- Card rankings: big joker -> small joker -> trump card -> A, K, Q, J, 10, ... 2
- Five-card hands: five of a kind → straight flush → four of a kind → full house → flush → straight
  - Poker-hand rankings only take into account the top set. For example, a full house of 666JJ is the same value as 66622.
- All suits are equal.

=== Wild cards ===
Jokers can be used as wild cards. A wild card can become any single lower card in order to form a multi-card hand. For example, a joker and an ace may be played as a pair of aces. The highest possible rank of the play will be taken, for instance, joker-6-7-8-9 always counts as 6-7-8-9-10, rather than 5-6-7-8-9.

== Gameplay ==
- The offense leader starts the game with any legal play of his choice.
- The next player (usually clockwise) must continue the turn with a legal play using the same number of cards, or else pass to the next player.
- Play continues this way until all other 5 players pass.
- The last player to play on that turn wins the turn. He can then start a new turn, with any legal play of his choice.
- The play continues until all players in one team have escaped. The round is over.

During the game, a player can ask any other player for number of cards remaining in his hand. The other player must answer truthfully if he has 10 or fewer cards, otherwise he is not allowed to answer.

== Scoring ==
Scoring is determined at the end of each round. The offense team is the team that started the round. The defending team is the opposing team.

- Offense team player escapes first, and at least one defending player is trapped: Offense team won the round. Offense team scores, and advances to the next level. Trapped players pay a tribute in the next round.
- Offense team player escapes first, but offense team player is trapped: Draw. No tribute. The offense team remains the offense team.
- Defending team player escapes first, and at least one offense team player is trapped: Defending team won the round. Defending team will be the offense team in the next round. Trapped players will pay tribute in the next round.
- Defending team player escapes first, but defending team player is trapped: Draw. No tribute. Defending team will be the offense team in the next round.

As stated earlier:

- Only the offense team can score (advance to the next level)
- The first player to escape determines the offense team in the next round.
- Trapped players pay tribute only if their team lost the round.

=== Advancing levels ===
If the offense team scores and advances a level, the trump card changes. At the start of the game, the trump card is 2. For example, when the offense team scores, the trump card becomes 3.

== Tribute ==
Each defending player who was trapped, has to pay a tribute to the offense team. A tribute is the highest card in his hand. The trapped player (#6) has to give one card to the player who escaped first (#1). If two players were trapped, then #5 has to give one card to #2. If three players were trapped, then #4 would have to give one card to #3.

If the tribute card is not a Joker, the receiver returns a single card of his choice. Some players use a rule if the tribute card is a Joker, the tribute receiver must offer two cards. The tribute giver can keep one of the two cards, or keep both cards and return a card higher than either card.

The tribute and return cards are made public to all players.

== Strategies ==
- Teamwork is critical to winning in wild escape.
- Always help the player in your team who has the best hand to escape first.
- Support hands played by your own team, and oppose hands played by the opposing team.

== See also ==
- Big two
- Dou dizhu
