= Zi pai =

Type of Chinese playing cards

- 字牌
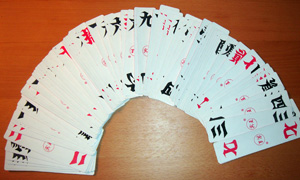
- Zi Pai card deck
- Origin: China
- Type: Draw-and-discard
- Players: 3
- Cards: 80
- Deck: Chinese
- Play: clockwise

Zi pai (Chinese: 字牌; trans. "character cards"; also paohuzi, Chinese: 跑胡子) are Chinese playing cards that are popular mainly in the southern part of mainland China, especially in Hunan and Sichuan.

== Description ==
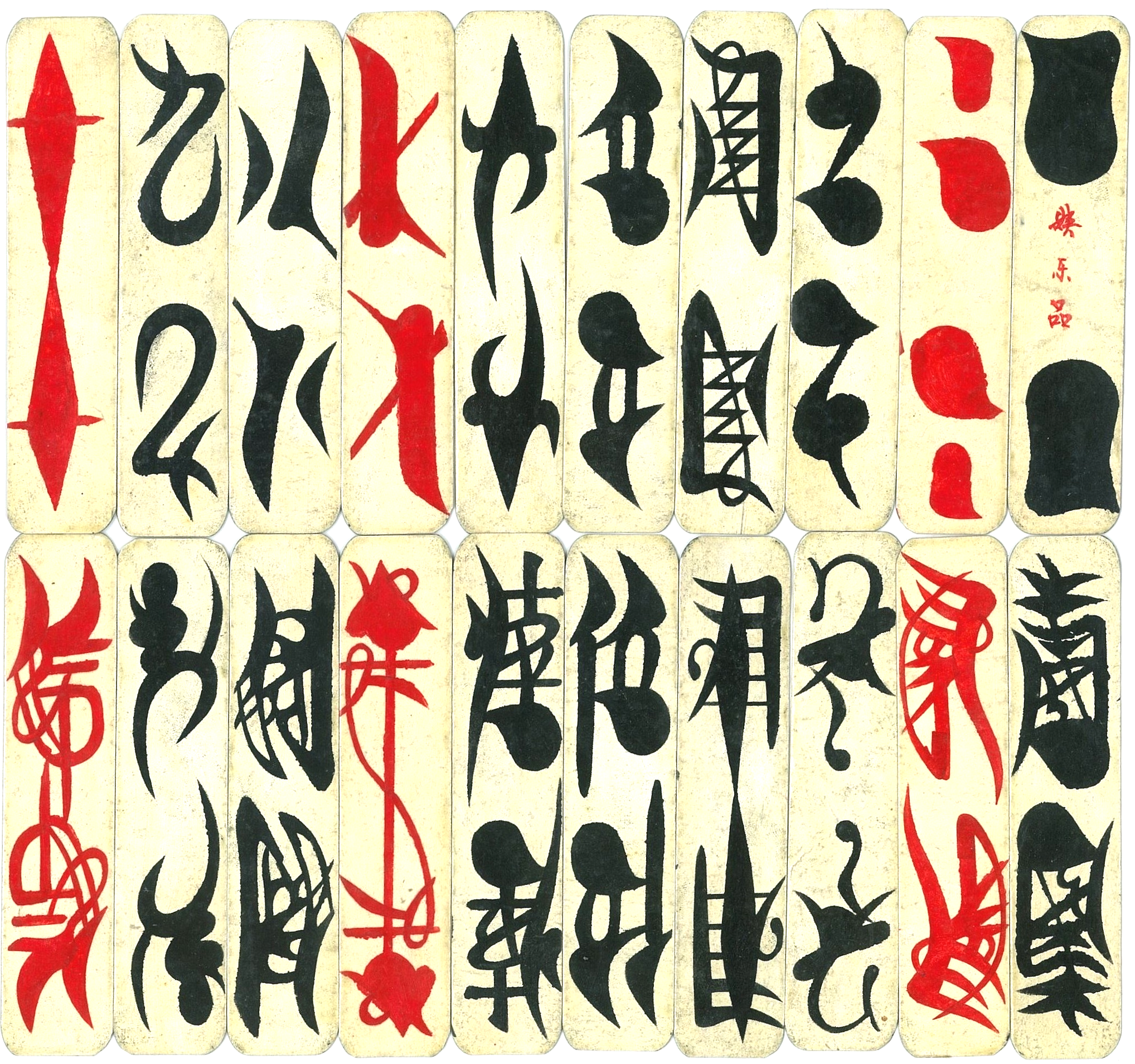
Guizhou-style zi pai cards.

These cards originated from Leshan, Sichuan during the middle of the Qing dynasty and then spread outwards to other parts of southern China. The special deck has two series of cards numbered from one to ten. One series of cards features numbers written in an "ordinary" style (数字小写), while the other series of cards has numbers written in a "formal" style (数字大写). Every card is quadrupled to bring the total to 80 cards. Numbers 2, 7 and 10 are printed in red, and all others are printed in black. Some decks may have extra cards that act as wild cards.

== 2-7-10 ==
2-7-10 (simplified Chinese: 二七十; traditional Chinese: 貳柒拾; pinyin: Èr Qī Shí) is the standard game played with these cards. It is a draw-and-discard type game like Mahjong and Rummy. Usually there are only three players in each game. The winner is the player who reaches 18 points first.

Suits — There are two suits: big and small (Chinese: 大小; pinyin: Dà Xiǎo) differentiated by both colours and their characters/patterns. The big suit is red and the small suit is black.

The cards belonging to the big suit always carry three points more than those of the small suit if the meld (see below) carries points at all.

Melds — When a player discards a card, any other player may "call" for it in order to complete a meld (a certain set of three or four cards) in their own hands. When a meld is declared through a discard, the player must state the type of meld to be declared and place the meld face up. The player must then discard a card (with the exception that they are making the second meld of four of a kind), and play continues to the left.

The disadvantage of doing this is that the player must now expose the completed meld to the other players, giving them information on the availability of cards left in the deck.

- Duì (simplified Chinese: 对; traditional Chinese: 對) meaning to make use of a pair) — A Duì is a set of three identical cards. If a duì is made by calling a card, a big duì carries three points whilst a small dui carries one point. If it is made in a player's hand during the initial drawing, then they carry six and three points respectively.
- Kāi (simplified Chinese: 开; traditional Chinese: 開) — A Kāi is a set of four identical cards. A kāi in the big suit carries nine points and six points in the small suit if exposed; or they both gain three extra points for being concealed in a player's hand.

If a player is forming a second set of kāi all cards (both concealed in their hands and exposed on the table) considered, they should not discard any cards for that particular turn or they will not be able to win the game.

- Chī (Chinese: 吃) — A Chī is a meld of three suited tiles in sequence or any three cards of the same number. They do not carry any points unless they are formed by the numbers two, seven and ten.

When a chī is formed by calling, any melds that contains the card being called need to be exposed to other players as well.

- 2-7-10 The meld 2-7-10 is a special type of chī which can only be formed if they are of the same suit. A black or small 2-7-10 carries three points when exposed, and six if not; a red or big set carries six or nine points depending on its visibility to other players.
- Jiang (simplified Chinese: 将; traditional Chinese: 將) — The pair, while not a meld (and thus cannot be declared or formed with a discard, except if completing the pair completes the hand), is the final component to the standard hand. It consists of any two identical cards.

Gameplay — The game starts by a chosen player (if the first game) or the winner (of the previous game) drawing the first two cards. Each player then draws two cards until the lead has 20 cards in their hand and announces the end of the drawing phase by drawing one last card and discarding the first card. So each player has 20 cards to start with.

== See also ==
- Sheng ji
- Dou dizhu
- Gnau
