= Two of Hearts =

The two of hearts is a playing card in the standard 52-card deck.

Two of Hearts also refer to:

- Two of Hearts (film), a 1999 television film
- "Two of Hearts" (song), a 1986 song by Stacey Q
- "Two of Hearts" (Highlander: The Series), a 1998 TV episode

== See also ==
- or
- Three of Hearts (disambiguation)
- Six of Hearts (disambiguation)
- Jack of Hearts (disambiguation)
- Queen of Hearts (disambiguation)
- King of Hearts (disambiguation)
- Ace of Hearts (disambiguation)
- Two Hearts (disambiguation)
