= Six of Hearts =

The six of hearts is a playing card in the standard 52-card deck.

Six of Hearts may also refer to:

- Six of Hearts (character), a fictional character in The Lab and 'Remote Control"
- Six of Hearts (EP), a 1997 jazz album

== See also ==
- or
- Two of Hearts (disambiguation)
- Three of Hearts (disambiguation)
- Jack of Hearts (disambiguation)
- Queen of Hearts (disambiguation)
- King of Hearts (disambiguation)
- Ace of Hearts (disambiguation)
