= Three of Hearts =

The three of hearts is a playing card in the standard 52-card deck.

Three of Hearts may also refer to:

- 3 of Hearts, an American country music trio
  - 3 of Hearts (album), a 2001 country pop album
- Three of Hearts: A Postmodern Family, a 2004 documentary film
- Three of Hearts (1993 film), a 1993 sex comedy film

== See also ==
- or
- Two of Hearts (disambiguation)
- Six of Hearts (disambiguation)
- Jack of Hearts (disambiguation)
- Queen of Hearts (disambiguation)
- King of Hearts (disambiguation)
- Ace of Hearts (disambiguation)
- Three Hearts (disambiguation)
