= Three Hearts (disambiguation) =

Three Hearts is an album by rock musician and former Fleetwood Mac guitarist Bob Welch.

Three Hearts may also refer to:

- Radenska Three Hearts, a bottled water brand
- The Three Hearts, a 1939 Polish film
- Three Hearts (film), a 2014 French film
- Three Hearts (Alex Clare album), 2014 Alex Clare album

== See also ==
- Four Hearts (disambiguation)
- Three of hearts (disambiguation)
- Two Hearts (disambiguation)
