= Richard Landis production discography =

- Studio albums: 49
- Compilation albums: 28
- Singles: 58
- Soundtracks: 5
- Tribute albums: 4
- Karaoke: 2
- Holiday albums: 9
- Box sets: 5
- Gospel: 1

This production discography documents recordings released with American producer and musician Richard Landis shown on the album's liner notes as composer, musician, and/or producer. The recordings are categorized by industry standards and included in the appropriate section; shown and linked at right. →

The titles are presented chronologically and span Landis' career from 1970 to the present. Only released titles are included with no speculation on titles in production. Recordings that were completed, but never released, will be annotated by footnotes.

== Releases ==
=== Studio albums ===
Year	Recording		Production information					Charts, Awards & Certifications							Label
Year	Recording		Production information					Album				Singles		^{A}&_{C}	Label
Year	Title	Artist	Catalog#	Time	Songs	Format	Genre	US TCA	US 200	Top HSA	Top PCA	Yes^{&no.}	Yes^{if}^{charted}	^{—}	Label
1970	Danks	Danks	Landis' credits Producer Full list: Richard Landis; Producer; Art Polhemus; Engineer; Doc Siegel; Engineer Track listing: 1. "Mountain Of Love"; 2. "Matthew Mouse"; 3. "A Thousand Crickets"; 4. "I’m Lonely"; 5. "Mister Sun"; 6. "Stefani"; 7. "Time To Be Free"; 8. "Right In The Centre"; 9. "Nightingale"; 10. "Sweet Lady (For Lucy)"; 11. "We’re In It Together"					—	—	—	—	—	—	^{—}	Colossus
1970	Danks	Danks	CS-1005		11	LP	Pop/Rock	—	—	—	—	—	—	^{—}	Colossus
1970	It's Been So Long	Spencer Davis	Landis' credits Piano Full list: Spencer Davis; Guitar, vocals Barry Hessel; Peter Jameson; Guitar; Larry Knechtel; Keyboards; Richard Landis; Piano; Jay Senter; Producer; Doc Siegel; Engineer Track listing: 1. "It's Been So Long" 2:50; 2. "Crystal River" 3:11; 3. "One Mundred Years Ago" 3:55; 4. "Balkan Blues" 3:35; Side B: 1. "Brother Can You Make Up Your Mind" 2:35; 2. "Mountain Lick" 4:25; 3. "Jay's Tune (Mountain A In Girl)" 3:30; 4. "Thinking Of Her" 2:50; 5. "It's Too Late Now" 5:35					—	—	—	—	—	—	^{—}	Mediarts
1970	It's Been So Long	Spencer Davis	R34808			LP	Pop/Rock	—	—	—	—	—	—	^{—}	Mediarts
1971	There's Gotta Be a Change	Albert Collins	Landis' credits Piano Full list: Bud Brisbois; Trumpet; Pete Candoli; Trumpet; Albert Collins; Guitar, vocals James Dallam; Keyboards, piano Larry Daniels; Drums; Dr. John; Keyboards; Bryan Garofalo; Bass; Jimmie Haskell; Arranger, horn Jim Horn; Saxophone; Plas Johnson; Saxophone; Jim Keltner; Drums; Lee Kiefer; Engineer; Bobby Knight; Trombone; Richard Landis; Piano; Lew McCreary; Trombone; Jay Migliori; Saxophone; Bill Perkins; Saxophone; Mac Rebennack; Piano; Judy Roderick; Vocals; Michael Rosso; Bass, drums Aaron Schumaker; Design; Bill Szymczyk; Engineer, producer, vocals Ernie Watts; Saxophone; Brent Williamson; Vocals; Joe Zagarino; Keyboards, piano Track listing: 1. "There's Gotta Be a Change" (Collins); 2. "In Love Wit'cha" (Collins); 3. "Stickin'" (Collins); 4. "Today Ain't Like Yesterday" (Collins); 5. "Somethin' on My Mind" (Collins); 6. "Frog Jumpin'" (Collins); 7. "I Got a Mind to Travel" (Collins); 8. "Get Your Business Straight" (Collins); 9. "Fade Away Casey"					—	196	—	—	Yes; 1	Yes; R&B	^{—}	Pony Canyon
1971	There's Gotta Be a Change	Albert Collins	24193		9	LP/CD	Blues	—	196	—	—	Yes; 1	Yes; R&B	^{—}	Pony Canyon
1972	Natural Causes	Richard Landis	Landis' credits Piano, vocals Full list: Billy Cobham; Drums; Eileen Gilbert; Vocals (background); John Hall; Guitar, guitar (steel); Hilda Harris; Vocals (background); Richard Landis; Piano, vocals Arlene Martell; Vocals (background); Harry Max; Guitar (bass); Hugh McCracken; Harmonica; Helene Miles; Vocals (background); Linda November; Vocals (background); Johnny Pacheco; Conga; David Spinozza; Guitar; Maretha Stewart; Vocals (background); John Tropea; Guitar Track listing: 1. "A Woman You Don't Love"; 2. "Livin' Like a Gypsy"; 3. "Soft Answers"; 4. "From Champagne to Candied Yams"; 5. "Natural Causes"; 6. "A Man Who Sings"; 7. "Freedom Is the Name of the Man"; 8. "Better"; 9. "We're Gonna Make It"; 10. "Ragged Man"					—	—	—	—	Yes; 2	Yes; ACC	^{—}	Dunhill
1972	Natural Causes	Richard Landis	R42788		10	LP	Pop/Rock	—	—	—	—	Yes; 2	Yes; ACC	^{—}	Dunhill
1972	Tenterfield Saddler	Peter Allen	Landis' credits Producer, arranger, conductor, piano Full list: Peter Allen; Keyboards, piano, vocals Bob Daugherty; Fretless bass Richard Davis; Guitar (bass); Emanuel Green; John Hall; Guitar; Bill Keith; Banjo, guitar (steel); Wells Kelly; Drums; Richard Landis; Producer, arranger, conductor, piano Ralph MacDonald; Percussion; Hugh McCracken; Guitar; Don Payne; Fretless bass Al Rogers; Drums; John Tropea; Guitar Track listing: 1. "Tenterfield Saddler" (Allen); 2. "More Than I Like You"; 3. "Same Way I Came In"; 4. "Good to See You up There"; 5. "I Can Tell a Lie"; 6. "Just Ask Me I've Been There" (Allen); 7. "Cocoon"; 8. "Harbour" (Allen); 9. "Somebody Beautiful Just Undid Me"; 10. "Other Side"					—	—	—	—	—	—	^{—}	Metromedia
1972	Tenterfield Saddler	Peter Allen	1056		10	LP	Vocal	—	—	—	—	—	—	^{—}	Metromedia
1977	Burnin' at the Stake	Domenic Troiano	Landis' credits Producer Full list: Michael Brecker; Sax (tenor), saxophone Randy Brecker; Producer, trumpet Vivian Cherry; Vocals, vocals (background); Lew Del Gatto; Sax (baritone), saxophone Vicki Fabry; Engineer; Steve Ferrone; Drums; Steve Freidman; Engineer; Alan Gorrie; Vocals, vocals (background); Gwen Guthrie; Vocals, vocals (background); Hilda Harris; Vocals, vocals (background); Shaun Jackson; Vocals; Neil Jason; Bass, vocals, vocals (background); Roy Kenner; Percussion, vocals Richard Landis; Producer; Ralph MacDonald; Percussion; Fred Mandel; Keyboards, synthesizer Scott Powers; Engineer; David Sanborn; Sax (alto), saxophone Hamish Stuart; Vocals, vocals (background); David Taylor; Trombone; Domenic Troiano; Guitar, vocals Dave Tysonl Keyboards, synthesizer, vocals Track listing: 1. "Burnin' at the Stake" (Troiano) 4:12; 2. "Peace of Mind" (Troiano) 3:36; 3. "Savour the Flavour" (Troiano) 3:38; 4. "Lonely Girl" (Troiano) 4:02; 5. "Willpower" (Troiano) 3:38; 6. "Master of Concealment" (Troiano) 3:01; 7. "I'd Rather Be Your Lover" (Troiano) 3:32; 8. "Rock and Roll Madness" (Troiano) 4:34; 9. "The Outer Limits of My Soul" (Troiano) 6:48					—	—	—	—	—	—	^{—}	Capitol
1977	Burnin' at the Stake	Domenic Troiano	11665	37:01	9	LP	Pop/Rock	—	—	—	—	—	—	^{—}	Capitol
1978	Close But No Guitar	King of Hearts (French band)	Landis' credits Producer Full list: Michael Braun; Drums; Dave Brown; Guitar; Peppi Castro; Bass; Ivan Elias; Bass; Loren Farber; Vocals; Robert Fitoussi; Vocals; Paul Griffin; Organ; Jim Haas; Vocals; Jon Joyce; Vocals; Dean Kraus; Keyboards; Richard Landis; Producer; Jeff Layton; Guitar; Jimmy Maelen; Percussion; Marty Nelson; Vocals; Steve Porcaro; Keyboards; Elliott Randall; Guitar; Lenny Roberts; Vocals; Rick Shlosser; Drums; Leland Sklar; Bass; Marc Tobaly; Guitar, vocals Tony Wells; Vocals; Jai Winding; Keyboards; Stu Woods; Bass Track listing: 1. "Stay With Me"; 2. "This Time Is Right"; 3. "Something to Hide"; 4. "There's Always Time"; 5. "Just Because"; 6. "How Long Does It Take?"; 7. "Ridin' On"; 8. "Fancy Dancer"; 9. "Love for Hire"					—	—	—	—	—	—	^{—}	Capitol
1978	Close But No Guitar	King of Hearts (French band)	SW-11848		9	LP	Pop/Rock	—	—	—	—	—	—	^{—}	Capitol
1979	Desmond Child & Rouge	Desmond Child & Rouge	Landis' credits Producer Full list: Rubens Bassini; Percussion; Michael Brecker; Horn; Randy Brecker; Horn; James Buffington; Horn; Charles Calellol Arranger; Joe Caro; Guitar; Desmond Child; Composer, keyboards, vocals Dianne Crasselli; Vocals; Michael Delugg; Remixing; Godfrey Diamond; Engineer, mixing Malcolm Dome; Liner Notes; Larry Gates; Assistant engineer Neil Jason; Bass; David Landau Composer, guitar, soloist Ross Landau; Project coordinator Richard Landis; Producer; Jeff Layton; Guitar; Jimmy Maelen; Percussion; Jimmy Maeulel; Percussion; Jeff Mirinoff; Guitar; Jeff Mironov; Guitar, myriam vocals Gene Orloff; Concert master Ryan Oxley; Assistant; Ken Perry; Mastering; Elliott Randall; Guitar, soloist Larry Rosen; Engineer; Larry Saltzman; Guitar, guitar arrangements, soloist Ralph Schuckett; Keyboards; Allan Schwartzberg; Drums; Paul Shaffer; Keyboards; Ralph Shuckett; Keyboards; John Siegler; Bass; Paul Stanley; Composer; Bill Stein; Assistant engineer John Susswell; Drums, myriam Naomi Valle; Vocals; Maria Vidal; Vocals; Rick Wakeman; Synthesizer arrangements George Young; Horn Track listing: 1. "Westside Pow Wow" (Child) 3:31; 2. "Our Love Is Insane" (Child) 5:20; 3. "Lovin' Your Love" (Child) 3:12; 4. "The Fight" (Child, Landau, Stanley) 4:21; 5. "Main Man" (Child) 3:33; 6. "City in Heat" (Child) 3:54; 7. "Lazy Love" (Child) 3:27; 8. "Otti" (Child) 3:07; 9. "Givin' in to My Love" (Child) 2:59					—	157	—	—	—	—	^{—}	Capitol
1979	Desmond Child & Rouge	Desmond Child & Rouge	CDLEM47		9	LP/CD	Pop/Rock	—	157	—	—	—	—	^{—}	Capitol
1979	Runners in the Night	Desmond Child & Rouge	Landis' credits Producer Full list: Desmond Child; Keyboards, vocals Randy Courts; Keyboards; Dianne Crasselli; Vocals; Godfrey Diamond; Engineer, mixing Doug Epstein; Engineer; Richard Landis; Producer; Jerry Marotta; Drums; John Siegler; Bass; G.E. Smith; Guitar; Bette Sussmann; Keyboards; Myriam Naomi Valle; Vocals; Maria Vidal; Vocals Track listing: 1. "Truth Comes Out"; 2. "My Heart's on Fire"; 3. "Night Was Not"; 4. "Goodbye Baby"; 5. "Runners in the Night"; 6. "Tumble in the Night"; 7. "Scared to Live"; 8. "Feeling Like This"; 9. "Imitation of Love"; 10. "Rosa"					—	—	—	—	—	—	^{—}	Capitol
1979	Runners in the Night	Desmond Child & Rouge	R33071		10	LP	Pop/Rock	—	—	—	—	—	—	^{—}	Capitol
1980	Nielsen Pearson	Nielsen/Pearson	Landis' credits Arranger, keyboards, producer Full list: Scott Bowen; Keyboards, Moog synthesizer Pete Christlieb; Wind; Vinnie Colaiuta; Drums; Paulinho Da Costa; Percussion; Stan Farber; Vocals, vocals (background); Victor Feldman; Keyboards, vibraphone Chuck Findley; Wind; David Foster; Keyboards, piano Gene Arnold Goe; Wind; Jim Haas; Vocals (background); Richard Hyde; Trombone; Charles "Icarus" Johnson; Guitar; Jon Joyce; Vocals, vocals (background); Jackie Kelso; Wind; Richard Landis; Arranger, keyboards, producer Tim May; Guitar; Reed Nielsen; Guitar, keyboards, vocals, vocals (background); Mark Pearson; Guitar, keyboards, vocals, vocals (background); Bill Perkins; Wind; Tom Scott; Lyricon, saxophone Stephanie Spruill; Vocals (background); Neil Stubenhaus; Bass; Julia Tillman Waters; Vocals, vocals (background); Jai Winding; Keyboards; Peter Wolf; Clavinet, keyboards Track listing: 1. "Two Lonely Nights"; 2. "Don't Let Me Go"; 3. "Love Me Tonight"; 4. "Annie"; 5. "If You Should Sail"; 6. "Givin' Your Love to Me"; 7. "Don't Forget"; 8. "Hurt No More"					—	—	—	—	Yes; 1	Yes; H100	^{—}	Capitol
1980	Nielsen Pearson	Nielsen/Pearson	12101		8	LP	Pop/Rock	—	—	—	—	Yes; 1	Yes; H100	^{—}	Capitol
1981	Gary O	Gary O'	Landis' credits Keyboards, producer Full list: Charles Calello; Arranger, conductor George Doering; Guitar; Stan Farber; Vocals (background); Bryan Garofalo; Guitar (bass); Jim Haas; Vocals (background); Jon Joyce; Vocals (background); Craig Krampf; Drums; David Landau; Guitar; Richard Landis; Keyboards, producer Jai Winding; Keyboards; Peter Wolf; Keyboards, synthesizer Track listing: 1. "All the Young Heroes"; 2. "Pay You Back With Interest"; 3. "California (Good-Bye)"; 4. "I Believe in You"; 5. "Suzanne"; 6. "The Way You Look Tonight" (Fields, Kern); 7. "Just a Little Love"; 8. "Nightrider"; 9. "Been a Long Time"					—	—	—	—	Yes; 1	Yes; H100	^{—}	Capitol
1981	Gary O	Gary O'	R173240		9	LP	Pop/Rock	—	—	—	—	Yes; 1	Yes; H100	^{—}	Capitol
1981	Juice	Juice Newton	Landis' credits Producer Full list: Philip Aaberg; Keyboards, synthesizer Boudleaux Bryant; Composer; Felice Bryant; Composer; Dennis Budimir; Guitar, guitar (acoustic); Ruth Burghardt; Production coordination Charles Bush; Photography; Charles Calello; Arranger; Mark Carbonneau; Drums; Scott Chambers; Bass; Joe Chiccarelli; Engineer, recording Jodi Cohen; Typesetting; David Cole; Assistant engineer Hugh Davies; Assistant engineer George Doering; Guitar, guitar (electric); Dan Dugmore; Guitar (steel), pedal steel Kenny Edwards; Vocals, vocals (background); Stan Farber; Vocals, vocals (background); Brad Felton; Banjo, dobro Steve Forman; Percussion; Mitch Gibson; Assistant engineer Andrew Gold; Guitar, vocals, vocals (background); Jim Haas; Vocals (background); Steve Hoffman; Remastering; Mitch Holder; Guitar, guitar (electric); Jon Joyce; Vocals, vocals (background); Roy Kohara; Art direction Richard Landis; Producer; Doug Livingston; Guitar (steel), keyboards, pedal steel Jay Dee Maness; Guitar (steel); JayDee Mannes; Guitar (steel), pedal steel Henry Marquez; Art direction Chuck Martin; Guitar, guitar (electric); Tim May; Guitar, guitar (electric); Lewis Morford; Vocals, vocals (background); Juice Newton; Guitar, guitar (acoustic), vocals Rick Shlosser; Drums; Karen Siegel; Assistant engineer Harry Stinson; Vocals, vocals (background); Neil Stubenhaus; Bass; Fred Tackett; Guitar, guitar (acoustic); Wally Traugott; Mastering; Michael Verdick; Mixing; Billy Joe Walker; Guitar, guitar (acoustic); Brock Walsh; Vocals, vocals (background); Bob Williams; Drums; Otha Young; Associate producer, guitar, guitar (electric), percussion, synthesizer, vocals Track listing: 1. "Angel of the Morning: (Taylor) 4:12; 2. "Shot Full of Love" McDill 3:22; 3. "Ride 'Em Cowboy" (Davis) 3:30; 4. "Queen of Hearts" (DeVito) 3:29; 5. "River of Love" (Newton, Young) 2:53; 6. "All I Have to Do Is Dream" (Bryant, Bryant) 3:10; 7. "Headin' for a Heartache" (Hill, Wilde) 2:46; 8. "Country Comfort" (John, Taupin) 4:17; 9. "Texas Heartache" (Stegall, Waters) 2:59; 10. "The Sweetest Thing (I've Ever Known)" (Young) 4:04					4	22	—	—	—	—	CAN: 3× Platinum; US: Platinum	Capitol
1981	Juice	Juice Newton	ST-12136	34:42	10	LP	Pop/Rock	4	22	—	—	—	—	CAN: 3× Platinum; US: Platinum	Capitol
1981	As Far as Siam	Red Rider	Landis' credits Producer Full list: Rob Baker; Drums, harmonica, percussion Peter Boynton; Keyboards, organ, piano, synthesizer, vocals Joe Chiccarelli; Engineer, mixing, recording Tom Cochrane; Guitar, guitar (rhythm), vocals George Doering; Guitar; Steve Forman; Percussion; Kim Green; Guitar, keyboards Ken Greer; Guitar, guitar (electric), guitar (steel), keyboards, organ, piano, vocals Michael James Jackson; Percussion, producer Jeff Jones; Guitar (bass), vocals (background); Richard Landis; Producer; Jai Winding; Keyboards Track listing: 1. "Lunatic Fringe" (Cochrane) 4:23; 2. "Cowboys in Hong Kong" (As Far as Siam) (Baker, Cochrane, Greer) 4:08; 3. "Only Game in Town" (Cochrane) 3:21; 4. "Thru the Curtain" (Baker, Boynton, Cochrane, Greer) 3:19; 5. "What Have You Got to Do (To Get off Tonight)" (Cochrane) 3:21; 6. "Ships" (Cochrane) 4:37; 7. "Caught in the Middle" (Cochrane) 4:25; 8. "Don't Let Go of Me (Cochrane) 3:55; 9. "Laughing Man" (Cochrane, Jones) 3:38					—	65	—	—	Yes; 3	Yes; 4X	^{—}	Capitol
1981	As Far as Siam	Red Rider	C2-93938	34:52	9	LP/CD/CS	Pop/Rock	—	65	—	—	Yes; 3	Yes; 4X	^{—}	Capitol
1982	Let's Go	The Nitty Gritty Dirt Band	Landis' credits Producer Full list: Jimmie Fadden; Drums, guitar, harmonica Jeff Hanna; Guitar, vocals Jimmy Ibbotson; Drums, guitar, keyboards, vocals Richard Landis; Producer; Kenny Loggins; Vocals; John McEuen; Guitar, guitar (steel), vocals Norbert Putnam; Producer; Rick Shlosser; Drums Track listing: 1. "Heartaches in Heartaches" (Gold) 3:30; 2. "Special Look" (Carpenter, Hanna) 3:14; 3. "Shot Full of Love" (McDill) 3:23; 4. "Never Together (But Close Sometimes)" (Crowell) 3:06; 5. "Goodbye Eyes" (Loggins) 3:23; 6. "Maryann" (Crenshaw) 3:10; 7. "Too Many Heartaches in Paradise" (Greer, Wilson) 4:00; 8. "Don't Get Sand in It" (Goodman, Kelly) 3:28; 9. "Let's Go" (Fadden, Hanna) 3:06; 10. "Dance Little Jean" (Ibbotson) 3:12					26	—	—	—	Yes; 2	Yes; HCS	^{—}	Liberty
1982	Let's Go	The Nitty Gritty Dirt Band	R34662		10	LP	Pop/Rock	26	—	—	—	Yes; 2	Yes; HCS	^{—}	Liberty
1983	Blind Luck	Nielsen/Pearson	Landis' credits Keyboards Full list: Scott Bowen; Keyboards; Robbie Buchanan; Keyboards; Lenny Castro; Drums, percussion Vinnie Colaiuta; Drums; Victor Feldman; Keyboards; Steve Forman; Percussion; Jim Haas; Vocals; Charles "Icarus" Johnson; Guitar; Jon Joyce; Vocals; Michael Landau; Guitar; Richard Landis; Keyboards; Steve Lukather; Guitar; Reed Nielsen; Guitar, keyboards, vocals Mark Pearsonl Guitar, keyboards, vocals Neil Stubenhaus; Bass; Ian Underwood; Synthesizer; Carlos Vega; Drums; Jai Winding; Keyboards Track listing: 1. "Hasty Heart" (Nielsen/Pearson); 2. "Sentimental" (Nielsen/Pearson); 3. "Too Good to Last" (David Roberts); 4. "Break Nobody's Heart" (Nielsen/Pearson); 5. "I hear You Breathing" (Nielsen/Pearson); 6. "Lauralei" (Nielsen/Pearson); 7. "Expectations" (Nielsen/Pearson); 8. "Fade Away" (Nielsen/Pearson); 9. "Got Me Where You Want Me" (Nielsen/Pearson); 10. "Carrie" (Nielsen/Pearson)					—	—	—	—	—	—	^{—}	Capitol
1983	Blind Luck	Nielsen/Pearson	12176		10	LP	AOR	—	—	—	—	—	—	^{—}	Capitol
1983	Dirty Looks	Juice Newton	Landis' credits Percussion, vocals, vocals (background) Full list: Philip Aaberg; Keyboards, piano, synthesizer Michael Boddicker; Synthesizer; Rev. Dave Boruff; Saxophone; Joe Chiccarelli; Mixing; Vinnie Colaiuta; Drums; Vince DiCola; Synthesizer; George Doering; Guitar; Steve Forman; Percussion; David Foster; Keyboards; Tommy Funderburk; Vocals, vocals (background); Mark Goldenberg; Guitar; Julia Jackson; Vocals; Tom Kelly; Vocals, vocals (background); Randy Kerber; Piano; Richard Landis; Percussion, vocals, vocals (background); Jim Lang; Organ, synthesizer Doug Livingston; Keyboards; Rick Marotta; Drums; Hugh McCracken; Guitar; Juice Newton; Guitar, vocals John Pierce; Vocals, vocals (background); Timothy B. Schmit; Vocals, vocals (background); Tom Scott; Saxophone; Rick Shlosser; Drums; Neil Stubenhaus; Bass; Fred Tackett; Guitar; Clydene Waters; Vocals, vocals (background); Maxine Willard Waters; Vocals, vocals (background); Michael Young; Synthesizer; Otha Young; Guitar, percussion, synthesizer, vocals Track listing: 1. "Dirty Looks" (Robbins, Stephenson) 3:47; 2. "Tell Her No" (Argent) 3:32; 3. "Til I Loved You" (Robbins, Silbar, Stephenson) 3:55; 4. "Keeping Me on My Toes" (Satzer, Seals) 4:09; 5. "Twenty Years Ago" (Newton, Noble, Spriggs, Tyler) 3:42; 6. "Don't Bother Me" (Young) 3:41; 7. "Stranger at My Door" (Black, Bourke, Chater) 3:27; 8. "Slipping Away" (Jordan, Kipner) 4:08; 9. "Runaway Hearts" (McDill, Moore) 4:47; 10. "For Believers" (Young) 2:15					52	17	—	—	Yes; 2	Yes; 3X	^{—}	Capitol
1983	Dirty Looks	Juice Newton	12294	37:23	9	LP	Country	52	17	—	—	Yes; 2	Yes; 3X	^{—}	Capitol
1983	Not the Boy Next Door	Peter Allen	Landis' credits Producer Full list: Peter Allen; Composer, keyboards, vocals Michael Boddicker; Synthesizer; Joe Chemay; Vocals (background); Vinnie Colaiuta; Drums; Donn Davenport; Art direction George Doering; Guitar; Victor Feldman; Percussion; Russell Ferrante; Keyboards; Steve Forman; Percussion; David Foster; Keyboards; Howard Fritzson; Design; Jim Haas; Vocals (background); Clydene Jackson; Vocals (background); Charles "Icarus" Johnson; Guitar; Jon Joyce; Vocals (background); Tom Keane; Composer; Bill King; Photography; Richard Landis; Producer; Dean Pitchford; Composer; Carole Bayer Sager; Composer; Ronnie Scott; Lyricon, saxophone Dick St Nicklaus; Composer; Neil Stubenhaus; Guitar (bass); Fred Tackett; Guitar; Julia Tillman Waters; Vocals (background); Maxine Willard Waters; Vocals (background) Track listing: 1. "Just Another Make-Out Song" (Allen, Foster) 4:10; 2. "Not the Boy Next Door" (Allen, Pitchford) 6:53; 3. "You'll Always Get Your Way" (Allen, Keane) 4:33; 4. "You and Me (We Had It All)" (Allen, Sager) 4:15; 5. "Fade to Black" (Allen) 3:53; 6. "Somebody's Got Your Love" (Saint Nicklaus) 3:36; 7. "You Haven't Heard the Last of Me" (Kaz, Snow) 4:15; 8. "Easy on the Weekend" (Allen) 4:00; 9. "Once Before I Go" (Allen, Pitchford) 4:22					170	—	—	—	Yes; 2	Yes; ACC	^{—}	Arista
1983	Not the Boy Next Door	Peter Allen	876295		9	CD	Vocal	170	—	—	—	Yes; 2	Yes; ACC	^{—}	Arista
1984	Can't Wait All Night	Juice Newton	Landis' credits Arranger, musician, percussion, producer Full list: Bryan Adams; Composer; Maxine Anderson; Musician, vocals, vocals (background); Eddy Arnold; Composer; Mike Baird; Drums, musician Dennis Belfield; Bass, musician Jan Buckingham; Composer; Charles Calello; Rhythm arrangements Bill Champlain; Musician, vocals (background); Bill Champlin; Vocals; George Doering; Arranger, guitar, keyboards, musician Danny Douma; Composer; Tim DuBois; Composer; Kevin Dukes; Guitar, musician Gary Durrett; Arranger, musician, vocals, vocals (background); Kenny Edwards; Musician, vocals (background); Richard Feldman; Composer; Tommy Funderburk; Musician, vocals, vocals (background); Richard Gibbs; Keyboards, musician Andrew Gold; Guitar, musician, vocals, vocals (background); Dann Huff; Guitar, musician Jon Joyce; Musician, vocals, vocals (background); Tom Kelly; Musician, vocals (background); David Landis; Percussion; Richard Landis; Arranger, musician, percussion, producer Jim Lang; Arranger, musician, organ, organ (Hammond), synthesizer Jim Lee; Composer; Chuck Martin; Arranger; Linda McCrary-Campbell; Vocals; Linda McCrary; Musician, vocals (background); Juice Newton; Guitar, musician, vocals Reed Nielsen; Composer, keyboards musician Alan Pasqua; Keyboards, musician Joel Peskin; Musician, saxophone Johnny Pierce; Arranger; Greg Prestopino; Musician, vocals, vocals (background); Lisa Roberts; Musician, vocals, vocals (background); Phyllis Saint Jamesl Musician, vocals, vocals (background); Todd Sharp; Composer; Howard Smith; Musician, vocals (background); Billy Steinberg; Composer; Van Stephenson; Composer; Fred Tackett; Guitar, musician Jim Vallance; Composer; Cindy Walker; Composer; Otha Young; Arranger, associate producer, composer, guitar, musician, percussion, synthesizer, vocals Track listing: 1. "A Little Love" (Douma, Feldman, Sharp) 3:58; 2. "(You Don't Hear) The One That Gets You" (Buckingham, Stephenson) 3:29; 3. "Can't Wait All Night (Adams, Vallance) 4:01; 4. "Restless Heart" (DuBois, Robbins, Stephenson) 3:50; 5. "Easy Way Out" (Kelly, Steinberg) 3:28; 6. "Let's Dance" (Lee) 2:40; 7. "He's Gone" (Nielsen) 3:47; 8. "You Don't Know Me" (Arnold, Walker) 3:38; 9. "Eye of a Hurricane" (Nielsen, Young) 4:07; 10. "Waiting for the Sun" (James, Young) 3:45					42	128	—	—	—	—	^{—}	WBR
1984	Can't Wait All Night	Juice Newton	4995	36:52	10	CD	Country	42	128	—	—	—	—	^{—}	WBR
1984	Inamorata	Poco	Landis' credits Rhythm arrangements Full list: Kim Bullard; Keyboards, vocals Stephen Chapman; Drums, percussion Joe Chiccarelli; Engineer, producer Vinnie Colaiuta; Drums, percussion Paul Cotton; Composer, guitar, producer, vocals George Doering; Guitar, vocals Steve Foreman; Drums, percussion Richie Furay; Guitar, vocals Richard Gibbs; Keyboards; Tom Goodkind; Composer; George Grantham; Drums, vocals Fred Hersch; Composer; Randy Kerber; Keyboards; Richard Landis; Rhythm arrangements Reed Neilson; Composer; Harry Payne; Composer; Dennis Rodriguez; Production assistant Timothy B. Schmit; Bass, vocals Neil Stubenhaus; Bass; Joe Vitale; Composer; Stan Watts; Cover illustration Bobby Womack; Composer; Rusty Young; Guitar, guitar (steel), producer, vocals Track listing: 1. "Days Gone By" (Cotton, Hersch, Vitale) 3:50; 2. "This Old Flame" (Neilson) 3:02; 3. "Daylight" (Goodkind, Payne, Womack, Young) 3:55; 4. "Odd Man Out" (Cotton) 3:06; 5. "How Many Moons" (Cotton) 4:30; 6. "When You Love Someone" (Young) 4:03; 7. "Brenda X" (Cotton) 3:38; 8. "Standing in the Fire" (Cotton) 3:46; 9. "Save a Corner of Your Heart" (Young) 3:41; 10. "The Storm" (Young) 4:25					—	167	—	—	Yes; 1	Yes; H100	^{—}	Atlantic
1984	Inamorata	Poco	WOU8148	37:56	10	CD	Pop/Rock	—	167	—	—	Yes; 1	Yes; H100	^{—}	Atlantic
1984	Righteous Anger	Van Stephenson	Landis' credits Percussion, producer Full list: Michael Baird; Drums; Dennis Belfield; Bass; Phil Brown; Vocals, vocals (background); Bill Champlin; Vocals, vocals (background); Joe Chiccarelli; Engineer, mixing, recording George Doering; Guitar; Michael Hanna; Keyboards; Dann Huff; Guitar; Tom Kelly; Vocals, vocals (background); Richard Landis; Percussion, producer Kenny Mims; Guitar; Alan Pasqua; Keyboards, synthesizer Van Stephenson; Vocals Track listing: 1. "Modern Day Delilah" (Buckingham, Stephenson) 4:37; 2. "I Know Who You Are (And I Saw What You Did)" (Buckingham, Stephenson) 4:07; 3. "What the Big Girls Do" (Buckingham, Stephenson) 3:40; 4. "Don't Do That" (Brown, Stephenson) 3:30; 5. "Others Only Dream" (Robbins, Silbar, Stephenson) 3:27; 6. "Righteous Anger" (Robbins, Stephenson) 3:40; 7. "The Cure Will Kill You" (Robbins, Stephenson) 4:25; 8. "You've Been Lied to Before" (Buckingham, Stephenson) 3:47; 9. "Heart over Mind" (Robbins, Stephenson) 4:31; 10. "All American Boy" (Robbins, Stephenson) 2:37					—	54	—	—	Yes; 2	Yes; H100	^{—}	HIVAU
1984	Righteous Anger	Van Stephenson	HV1003	38:21	10	LP	R&B	—	54	—	—	Yes; 2	Yes; H100	^{—}	HIVAU
1986	Suspicious Heart	Van Stephenson	Landis' credits Keyboards, percussion, producer, synthesizer Full list: Michael Baird; Drums; Dennis Belfield; Bass; George Doering; Guitar; Michael Fisher; Percussion; Tommy Funderburk; Vocals (background); Richard Gibbs; Keyboards, synthesizer Mark Hammond; Drums; Dann Huff; Guitar; Dave Innis; Keyboards, synthesizer Clydene Jackson; Vocals (background); Greg Jennings; Guitar; Tom Kelly Vocals (background); Craig Krampf; Drums; Michael Landau; Guitar; Richard Landis; Keyboards, percussion, producer, synthesizer Stan Lasiter; Guitar; Reed Nielsen; Keyboards, synthesizer Alan Pasqua; Keyboards, synthesizer Joseph Powell; Vocals (background); Michael Rhodes; Bass; Van Stephenson; Composer, vocals Julia Tillman Waters; Vocals (background); Joe Turano; Vocals (background); Waddy Wachtel; Guitar; Luther Waters; Vocals (background); Oren Waters; Vocals (background); Maxine Willard Waters; Vocals (background) Track listing: 1. "We're Doing Alright" 3:52; 2. "(We Should Be) Together Tonight" 3:46; 3. "Suspicious Heart" 5:08; 4. "Never Enough Night" 4:28; 5. "Confidentially Yours" 3:59; 6. "Desperate Hours" 4:23; 7. "Dancing With Danger" 3:52; 8. "Fist Full of Heat" 4:44; 9. "Make It Glamorous" (Brown, Stephenson) 3:41; 10. "No Secrets" 3:39					—	—	—	—	—	—	^{—}	HIVAU
1986	Suspicious Heart	Van Stephenson	HV1004		10	LP	R&B	—	—	—	—	—	—	^{—}	HIVAU
1986	Let Them Talk	Stone Fury	Landis' credits Keyboards Full list: Vinnie Colaiuta; Drums; Dean Cortez; Bass; Michael Fisher; Percussion; Bruce Gowdy; Guitar, guitar (rhythm), keyboards Richard Landis; Keyboards; Jim Lang; Keyboards; Reed Nielsen; Synthesizer; Alan Pasqua; Keyboards; Lenny Wolf; Guitar (rhythm), vocals, vocals (background) Track listing: 1. "Too Late" (Gowdy, Wolf); 2. "Lies on the Run" (Gowdy, Wolf); 3. "Let Them Talk" (Gowdy, Wolf); 4. "Babe" (Gowdy, Wolf); 5. "Eye of the Storm" (Gowdy, Wolf); 6. "Doin' What I Feel" (Gowdy, Wolf); 7. "Let the Time Take Care of You" (Gowdy, Wolf); 8. "I Should Have Told You" (Gowdy, Wolf); 9. "Stay" (Gowdy, Wolf)					—	—	—	—	—	—	^{—}	MCA
1986	Let Them Talk	Stone Fury	5788		9	LP	Pop/Rock	—	—	—	—	—	—	^{—}	MCA
1986	Old Flame	Juice Newton	Landis' credits Percussion, producer, vocals (background) Full list: Philip Aaberg; Keyboards; Beth Andersen; Vocals (background); Susan Boyd; Vocals (background); Joe Chemay; Vocals (background); Joe Chiccarelli; Engineer, recording Don Cook; Composer; Donna Davidson; Vocals (background); George Doering; Guitar, soloist Gary Durrett; Drums, vocals (background); Kenny Edwards; Vocals (background); Joe Egan; Composer; Andrew Gold; Guitar, soloist, vocals (background); Paul Gordon; Composer; Jay Gruska; Composer; Jim Haas; Vocals (background); Jon Joyce; Vocals (background); Robin Lamble; Bass; Richard Landis; Percussion, producer, vocals (background); Jim Lang; Keyboards; Dave Loggins; Composer; Chuck Martin; Guitar, soloist Juice Newton; Guitar, vocals Reed Nielsen; Composer; Richard Page; Vocals (background); Dean Parks; Composer; Alan Pasqua; Organ, synthesizer Gerry Rafferty; Composer; Timothy L. Schmidt; Vocals (background); Tom Scott; Saxophone, soloist Del Shannon; Composer; Rick Shlosser; Drums; Neil Stubenhaus; Bass; Fred Tackett; Guitar Track listing: 1. "Cheap Love" (Shannon) 3:32; 2. "You Make Me Want to Make You Mine" (Loggins) 4:10; 3. "Hurt" (Crane, Jacobs) 3:45; 4. "Old Flame" (Nielsen) 3:03; 5. "Stuck in the Middle with You" (Egan, Rafferty) 2:52; 6. "Feel a Whole Lot Better" (Clark) 3:31; 7. "What Can I Do with My Heart" (Young) 3:37; 8. "With You" (Parks, Parks) 3:39; 9. "One Touch" (Anderson) 3:28; 10. "Let Your Woman Take Care of You" (Cook, Nicholson) 3:42; 11. "Both to Each Other (Friends & Lovers)" (Gordon, Gruska) 3:53					12	—	—	—	Yes; 1	Yes; HCS	^{—}	RCA
1986	Old Flame	Juice Newton	6905	39:12	11	CD	Country	12	—	—	—	Yes; 1	Yes; HCS	^{—}	RCA
1986	Talking in Code	Glen Burtnik	Landis' credits Percussion, producer Full list: "Glen Burtnik Bass, Guitar, Keyboards, Vocals Alan Douches Engineer Anthony Galante Percussion Savron Hudson Percussion Dann Huff Guitar Richard Landis Percussion, Producer Jim Lang Keyboards Dave LaRue Bass Bob Messano Guitar Dusty Micale Keyboards Reed Nielsen Keyboards Alan Pasqua Keyboards Plinky Keyboards David Prater Drums Neil Stubenhaus Bass Ed Thacker Engineer John Vigran Engineer, Percussion" Track listing: 1. "Crank It Up"; 2. "Talking In Code"; 3. "Little Red House"; 4. "Perfect World"; 5. "Hole In My Pocket"; 6. "Brave Hearts"; 7. "Hold Back The Night"; 8. "Talk That Talk"; 9. "Heart On The Line"; 10. "We’re Alright"					—	—	—	—	—	—	^{—}	A&M
1986	Talking in Code	Glen Burtnik	SP-5114		10	LP	Pop/Rock	—	—	—	—	—	—	^{—}	A&M
1987	I Prefer the Moonlight	Kenny Rogers	Landis' credits Engineer, percussion, producer Full list: "Philip Aaberg Piano Antony Amos Re-Release Coordinator Jeff Balding Engineer, Mixing Brown Bannister Producer Eddie Bayers Drums Mike Brignardello Bass Robbie Buchanan Keyboards Larry Butler Producer Larry Byrom Guitar (Electric) Charles Calello Arranger Jimmy Capps Guitar (Acoustic) Kim Carnes Vocals Larry Castro Percussion Lenny Castro Keyboards, Percussion Gary Chapman Guitar (Acoustic), Vocals (Background) David T. Clydesdale String Arrangements John Coulter Design Bruce Dees Guitar (Electric) Diana DeWitt Vocals (Background) Jim Dineen Engineer, Overdub Engineer Peter Doggett Liner Notes Michael Dotson Assistant, Assistant Engineer Chris Eaton Vocals (Background) Tommy Funderburk Vocals (Background) Rob Galbraith Producer Randy Gardner Assistant, Assistant Engineer Carl Gorodetzky Concert Master, Strings Mick Guzauski Engineer Jim Haas Vocals (Background) Mary Hamilton Art Direction Ben Harris Engineer Chris Harris Vocals (Background) Dann Huff Guitar David Hungate Bass Clayton Ivey Piano John Jarvis Composer, Piano John Barlow Jarvis Composer James Johnson Assistant Engineer James Darrin Johnson Assistant Engineer James Ivory Johnson Assistant Archie Jordan String Arrangements Jon Joyce Vocals (Background) Kelly Junkermann Photography Shane Keister Keyboards, Synthesizer Jeanne Kinney Assistant, Assistant Engineer Wayne Kirkpatrick Composer, Vocals (Background) Michael Koreba Assistant, Assistant Engineer, Mixing Assistant Bill Lamb Composer Richard Landis Engineer, Percussion, Producer Jim Lang Organ, Programming Harold Lee Engineer Kyle Lehning Engineer, Producer Paul Leim Drums Rose Librizzik Stylist Laura Livingston Assistant, Assistant Engineer Larrie Londin Drums Vance Lorenzine Set Design Clif Magness Vocals (Background) Cliff Magnuss Vocals (Background) Brent Maher Engineer, Mixing, Producer Naomi Martin Composer Bud McGuire Composer Jim McKell Assistant, Assistant Engineer, Mixing Assistant Richard McKernan Assistant, Assistant Engineer Jerry McPherson Guitar, Slide Guitar Glenn Meadows Assembly, Mastering George Merrill Vocals (Background) Ronnie Milsap Piano (Electric) The Nashville String Machine Group, Strings Willie Nelson Composer Juice Newton Vocal Harmony Reed Nielsen Composer Mark O'Connor Fiddle, Mandolin Mark OConner Fiddle, Mandolin Keith Odle Assistant, Assistant Engineer Bobby Ogdin Keyboards, Piano Dave Parker Assistant, Assistant Engineer David Parker Assistant Engineer Dean Parks Guitar Alan Pasqua Synthesizer Don Potter Guitar (Acoustic), Vocals (Background) Denny Purcell Mastering Mike Reid Composer John "J.R." Robinson Drums Tommy Rocco Composer Kenny Rogers Guitar, Vocals Rick Ruggieri Engineer, Horn Engineer, String Engineer Billy Sanford Guitar (Electric) Doug Sax Mastering Billy Sherrill Engineer Kimberly Smith Production Coordination Neil Steubenhaus Bass Becky Stewart Re-Release Coordinator James Stroud Drums, Percussion Neil Stubenhaus Bass Wendy Suits Vocals (Background) Fred Tackett Guitar Ed Thacker Mixing Keith Thomas Composer, Keyboards Keith Thomas Keyboards Jon Toyce Vocals (Background) Wally Traugott Mastering Diane Vanette Vocals (Background) Pete Wade Guitar (Acoustic) D. Bergen White Vocals (Background) Bill Whittington Assistant, Assistant Engineer Jack Williams Bass Dennis Wilson Vocals (Background) Bob Wray Bass" Track listing: 1. "I Prefer the Moonlight" (Gary Chapman, Mark Wright) (5:10); 2. "Now and Forever" (Wayne Kirkpatrick, Keith Thomas) (4:09); 3. "We're Doin' Alright" (Reed Nielsen) (4:00); 4. "Make No Mistake, She's Mine" (With Ronnie Milsap) (Kim Carnes) (3:58); 5. "One More Day" (John Jarvis, Nielsen) (2:57); 6. "She's Ready for Someone to Love Her" (Charlie Black, Jerry Gillespie, Tommy Rocco) (2:51); 7. "I Don't Call Him Daddy" (Nielsen) (4:08); 8. "The Factory" (Bud McGuire) (3:26); 9. "We Fell in Love Anyway" (Naomi Martin, Mike Reid) (3:21); 10. "You Can't Say You Don't Love Me Anymore" (John Jarvis, Bill Lamb) (3:15)					18	163	—	—	Yes; 3	Yes; HCS	^{—}	RCA
1987	I Prefer the Moonlight	Kenny Rogers	6484	37:15	10	LP/CD	Country	18	163	—	—	Yes; 3	Yes; HCS	^{—}	RCA
1987	The Way Back Home	Vince Gill	Landis' credits Engineer, percussion, producer Full list: "Philip Aaberg Piano Bill Anderson Composer Paul Anka Composer Kristine Arnold Vocals (Background) Leonard Arnold Percussion Arlessa Barnes Project Coordinator Byron Berline Fiddle Joe Bogan Engineer Lisa Butler Project Coordinator Charles Calello Rhythm Arrangements Rosanne Cash ?, Vocals (Background) Rodney Crowell ?, Vocals (Background) Glenn Delgado Project Coordinator Jeff DeMorris Assistant Engineer Claudia Depkin Archivist Christina DeSimone Project Coordinator Hank DeVito Composer Robin Diamond Project Coordinator Jim Dineen Engineer George Doering Guitar Kevin Dorsey Vocals (Background) Kenny Edwards Vocals (Background) Mandana Eidgah Product Manager Elliott Federman Mastering Joanne Feltman Archivist Robyn Flans Liner Notes Kye Fleming Composer Rhonda Fleming Composer Felicia Gearhart Project Coordinator Janis Gill Vocals (Background) Vince Gill Banjo, Composer, Dobro, Guitar, Mandolin, Vocals, Vocals (Background) Andrew Gold Vocals (Background) Laura Gregory Project Coordinator Jim Haas Vocals (Background) Mary Hamilton Art Direction Emmylou Harris ?, Vocals (Background) Jeremy Holiday Production Coordination Roy M. "Junior" Husky Bass (Upright) Dennis Keeley Hand Tinting, Photography Randy Kerber Piano Buddy Killen Composer Glenn Korman Archivist Richard Landis Percussion, Producer, Synthesizer Jim Lang Synthesizer Donna Malyzsko Project Coordinator JayDee Mannes Pedal Steel Robin Manning Project Coordinator Richard McKeinon Assistant Engineer Brooke Mochomson Project Coordinator Reed Nielsen Guitar (Acoustic), Vocals (Background) Ed Osborne Project Coordinator Larry Parra Project Coordinator Alan Pasqua Synthesizer Csaba Petocz Engineer Bruce Pollock Project Coordinator Mike Ragogna Reissue Producer Bonnie Raitt ?, Vocals (Background) Dana Renert Project Coordinator David Richman Redesign Dennis Ritchie Assistant Engineer Dean Romanelli Project Coordinator Joe Schemay Vocals (Background) Catherine Seligman Project Coordinator Leland Sklar Bass Neil Steubenhaus Bass Steve Strauss Project Coordinator Sweethearts of the Rodeo Vocals (Background) Ed Thacker Mixing Tom Tierney Editorial Assistant Carlos Vega Drums John Vigran Engineer Jerry Whitman Vocals (Background)" Track listing: 1. "Everybody's Sweetheart" (Vince Gill) – 2:52; 2. "The Way Back Home" (Gill) – 3:56; 3. "Cinderella" (Reed Nielsen) – 3:36; 4. "Let's Do Something" (Gill, Nielsen) – 3:19; 5. "The Radio" (Gill, Nielsen) – 4:05; 6. "Baby That's Tough" (Gill, Guy Clark) – 3:38; 7. "Losing Your Love" (Gill, Hank DeVito, Rhonda Fleming) – 4:47; 8. "It Doesn't Matter Anymore" (Paul Anka) – 3:36; 9. "Something's Missing" (Gill) – 4:30					13	—	—	—	Yes; 1	Yes; HCS	^{—}	Buddah
1987	The Way Back Home	Vince Gill	99672	34:19	9	CD	Country	13	—	—	—	Yes; 1	Yes; HCS	^{—}	Buddah
1991	Something in Red	Lorrie Morgan	Landis' credits Producer, string arrangements Full list: Max D. Barnes Composer Richard Bennett Guitar (Electric) Michael Black Vocals (Background) Steve Buckingham Producer Spud Cottingham Keyboards, Vocals (Background) Jim Cotton Engineer, Mixing Costo Davis Synthesizer Glen Duncan Fiddle Skip Ewing Composer Dave Fowler Bass, Vocals (Background) Paul Franklin Guitar (Steel) Steve Gibson Guitar (Acoustic) Debbie Hall Vocals Sandi Hall Vocals Mary Hamilton Art Direction Mitch Humphries Keyboards Robert Jason Vocals Kym Juister Design Richard Landis Producer, String Arrangements Paul Leim Drums Mike McCarthy Assistant Engineer Essra Mohawk Songwriter Gene Morford Vocals Lorrie Morgan Vocals Reed Nielsen Composer Dolly Parton Performer, Producer Michael Rhodes Bass Brent Rowan Guitar (Electric) Noel Roy Guitar, Vocals (Background) Joe Scaife Mixing Gary Smith Producer Sally Stevens Vocals Harry Stinson Vocals (Background) Rick Vanaugh Drums, Vocals (Background) Jerry Whitman Vocals Hank Williams Mastering Dennis Wilson Vocals (Background) David Wood Guitar (Rhythm), Guitar (Steel), Vocals (Background) Glenn Worf Bass Track listing: 1. "Autumn's Not That Cold" (Skip Ewing, Max D. Barnes) – 3:41; 2. "We Both Walk" (Tom Shapiro, Chris Waters) – 3:05; 3. "Something in Red" (Angela Kaset) – 4:40; 4. "Except for Monday" (Reed Nielsen) – 2:56; 5. "A Picture of Me (Without You)" (Norro Wilson, George Richey) – 3:39; 6. "Tears on My Pillow" (Sylvester Bradford, Al Lewis) – 3:09; 7. "Best Woman Wins" (Dolly Parton) – 3:18 duet with Dolly Parton; 8. "In Tears" (Rory Michael Bourke, Mike Reid) – 3:25; 9. "Hand Over Your Heart" (Larson Paine, Bobby Paine, Essra Mohawk) – 3:10; 10. "Faithfully" (Jonathan Cain) – 3:58					8	53	—	—	Yes; 4	Yes; HCS	^{—}	RCA
1991	Something in Red	Lorrie Morgan	3021-2-R	35:14	10	CD	Country	8	53	—	—	Yes; 4	Yes; HCS	^{—}	RCA
1992	I Never Knew Lonely	Vince Gill	Landis' credits Producer Full list: Bill Anderson; Composer; Barry Beckett; Producer; Dennis Davis; Logotype; Kye Fleming; Composer; Vince Gill; Guitar, vocals Emory Gordy; Producer; Mary Hamilton; Art direction Kym Juister; Design; Dennis Keeley; Photography; Buddy Killen; Composer; Richard Landis; Producer; Larry Michael Lee; Mastering; Denny Purcell; Mastering Track listing: 1. "I Never Knew Lonely" (Gill) 3:52; 2. "What If I Say Goodbye" (Howard) 3:21; 3. "The Way Back Home" (Gill) 3:54; 4. "Livin' the Way I Do" (Gill) 3:21; 5. "Everybody's Sweetheart" (Gill) 2:49; 6. "True Love" (Gill) 3:59; 7. "Losing Your Love" (Anderson, DeVito, Fleming) 4:44; 8. "Midnight Train" (Gill) 2:55; 9. "Colder Than Winter" (Gill) 4:20					47	—	—	—	—	—	^{—}	RCA
1992	I Never Knew Lonely	Vince Gill	99672	34:19	9	CD	Country	47	—	—	—	—	—	^{—}	RCA
1992	Man with a Plan	Dennis Robbins	Landis' credits Full list: Track listing					—	—	—	—	—	—	^{—}	Giant
1992	Man with a Plan	Dennis Robbins	24458		10	CD	Country	—	—	—	—	—	—	^{—}	Giant
1992	Watch Me	Lorrie Morgan	Landis' credits Producer Full list: Ruven Afanador; Photography; Chuck Ainlay; Engineer, mixing Michael Black; Vocals (background); Mark E. Blumberg; Keyboards; Jessica Boucher; Vocals (background); Larry Byrom; Guitar, guitar (acoustic); Lisa Daniel; Vocals (background); Glen Duncan; Fiddle, mandolin Mary Beth Felts; Sonny Garrish; Guitar (steel); Steve Gibson; Guitar, guitar (acoustic), guitar (electric); Jeff Giedt; Assistant engineer James Griffin; Vocals (background); Mary Hamilton; Art direction Mitch Humphries; Keyboards; John Jarvis; Keyboards; Angela Kaset; Vocals (background); Jerome Kimbrough; Guitar, guitar (acoustic); Richard Landis; Producer; Paul Leim; Drums, percussion Richard Mainegra; Vocals (background); Carl Marsh; Keyboards; Russ Martin; Mixing assistant Lorrie Morgan; Vocals; Reed Nielsen; Composer; Bev Patterson; Hair stylist Denny Purcell; Mastering; Tom Roady; Percussion; Lisa Silver; Vocals (background); Grahame Smith; Assistant engineer Ed Thacker; Engineer; Wendy Waldman; Composer; Julie Wanca; Design; Vanessa Ware; Clothing/wardrobe; Dennis Wilson; Vocals (background); Glenn Worf; Bass; Rick Yancey; Vocals (background); Curtis Young; Vocals (background) Track listing: 1. "Half Enough" (Nielsen, Waldman) 3:50; 2. "I Guess You Had to Be There" (Cloyd, Robbin) 4:10; 3. "What Part of No" (Perry, Smith) 2:46; 4. "You Leave Me Like This" (Ewing) 2:53; 5. "Someone to Call Me Darling" (Daniel, Martin) 2:52; 6. "Watch Me" (Burr, Shapiro) 3:37; 7. "Behind His Last Goodbye" (Harter, Smith) 3:30; 8. "It's a Heartache" (Scott, Wolfe) 4:29; 9. "From Our House to Yours" (Kaset) 3:49; 10. "She's Takin' Him Back Again" (Mainegra, Yancey) 2:56					15	65	—	—	Yes; 3	Yes; HCS	^{—}	RCA
1992	Watch Me	Lorrie Morgan	66047-4	35:35	10	CD	Country	15	65	—	—	Yes; 3	Yes; HCS	^{—}	RCA
1993	Trainwreck of Emotion	Lorrie Morgan	Landis' credits Producer Full list: Barry Beckett; Producer; Richard Landis; Producer; Essra Mohawk; Songwriter; Lorrie Morgan; Vocals; Don Pfiefer; Composer; William Robinson; Composer Track listing: 1. "Trainwreck of Emotion" (Rhody, Vezner) 3:07; 2. "In Tears" (Bourke, Reid) 3:25; 3. "I'll Take the Memories" (Craig, Stegall) 3:54; 4. "Gonna Leave the Light On" (Pfiefer, Robinson) 3:02; 5. "One Step Ahead of You" (Harrison, McDill) 2:32; 6. "Autumn's Not That Cold" (Barnes, Ewing) 3:36; 7. "Hand over Your Heart" (Mohawk, Paine, Paine) 3:08; 8. "Faithfully" (Cain) 4:12					—	—	—	—	—	—	^{—}	BNA
1993	Trainwreck of Emotion	Lorrie Morgan	66219-4	26:56	8	CD	Country	—	—	—	—	—	—	^{—}	BNA
1993	Lisa Stewart	Lisa Stewart	Landis' credits A&R, producer Full list: Chuck Ainlay; Engineer, mixing, mixing engineer Allison Brown; Production assistant Charles Calello; Arranger, string arrangements Katherine DeVault; Art direction, design Glen Duncan; Fiddle; James Ferguson; Vocals (background); Sonny Garrish; Guitar (steel), pedal steel Steve Gibson; Guitar (electric); Carl Gorodetzky; Concert master Sherilyn Huffman; Vocals (background); Mitch Humphries; Keyboards; John Jarvis; Keyboards; Jana King; Vocals (background); Julian King; Assistant engineer Richard Landis; A&R, producer Mike Lawler; Synthesizer; Paul Leim; Drums, percussion Glenn Meadows; Mastering; Craig Nelson; Bass, bass (acoustic); Ric Pepin; A&R; Lynn Peterzell; Engineer; Csaba Petocz; Engineer; Matthew Rolston; Photography; Brent Rowan; Guitar (electric); Lisa Silver; Vocals (background); Grahame Smith; Assistant engineer Lisa Stewart; Liner Notes, vocals Diane Vanette; Vocals (background); Billy Joe Walker, Jr.; Guitar, guitar (acoustic); Bergen White; Vocals (background); Craig White; Assistant engineer, mixing assistant Dennis Wilson; Vocals (background); Glenn Worf; Bass; Curtis Young; Vocals (background) Track listing: 1. "Somebody's in Love" (Bogard, Clark) 3:31; 2. "Drive Time" (Cotter, Tribble) 3:35; 3. "Don't Touch Me" (Cochran) 3:02; 4. "Under the Light of the Texaco" (Fleming, Ian) 3:42; 5. "Old-Fashioned Broken Heart" (Kees, Sharp) 3:32; 6. "If I Was Her" (Angelle) 3:29; 7. "Forgive and Forget" (Angelle, Nielson) 3:11; 8. "That Makes One of Us" (Bowles, Wyrick) 3:17; 9. "There Goes the Neighborhood" (Hellard, Shapiro) 2:51; 10. "Is It Love" (Baird, Gillimore, Pfrimmer) 3:28					—	—	—	—	Yes; 2	Yes; HCS	^{—}	RCA
1993	Lisa Stewart	Lisa Stewart	66040	33:38	10	CD	Country	—	—	—	—	Yes; 2	Yes; HCS	^{—}	RCA
1993	Red and Rio Grande	Doug Supernaw	Landis' credits A&R, producer Full list: Chuck Ainlay; Engineer, mixing Eddie Bayers; Drums; Michael Black; Vocals; Allison Brown; Producer, production assistant Larry Byrom; Guitar (acoustic), guitar (electric); Todd Culross; Assistant, assistant engineer Jim DeVault; Photography; Katherine DeVault; Art direction, design Glen Duncan; Fiddle; Sonny Garrish; Pedal steel Steve Gibson; Guitar (electric); Mitch Humphries; Keyboards, piano David Hungate; Bass; Richard Landis; A&R, producer Graham Lewis; Mixing, mixing assistant Carl Marsh; Keyboards; Claudia McConnell; Stylist; Terry McMillan; Harmonica; Glenn Meadows; Mastering; Ric Pepin; A&R; Csaba Petocz; Engineer; Breon Reynolds; Groomer, grooming Harry Stinson; Vocals; Doug Supernaw; Liner Notes, vocals Billy Joe Walker; Guitar (acoustic), guitar (electric); Billy Joe Walker, Jr.; Guitar (acoustic), guitar (electric); Mervyn Warren; Vocals; Craig White; Assistant, assistant engineer Chris Willis; Vocals; Dennis Wilson; Vocals; Curtis Young; Vocals Track listing: 1. "Honky Tonkin' Fool" (Barker) 3:16; 2. "I Don't Call Him Daddy" (Nielsen) 3:49; 3. "Reno" (Buckley, Crider, Deleon, Huff, King) 3:33; 4. "The Perfect Picture (To Fit My Frame of Mind)" (Jones, McDill) 3:23; 5. "Five Generations of Rock County Wilsons" (Sherrill) 3:45; 6. "Red and Rio Grande" (Atkinson, Supernaw) 4:00; 7. "You're Gonna Bring Back Cheatin' Songs" (Shapiro, Waters) 3:10; 8. "I Would Have Loved You All Night Long" (Martin) 3:20; 9. "Daddy's Girl" (Robertson, Supernaw) 3:21; 10. "Carousel" (Supernaw) 2:48					27	147	3	—	Yes; 4	Yes; HCS	^{—}	BNA
1993	Red and Rio Grande	Doug Supernaw	66133	34:03	10	CD	Country	27	147	3	—	Yes; 4	Yes; HCS	^{—}	BNA
1993	Idle Hands	Tim Ryan	Landis' credits Full list: Track listing					—	—	—	—	Yes; 1	Yes; HCS	^{—}	BNA
1993	Idle Hands	Tim Ryan	66122-2	32:14	10	CD	Country	—	—	—	—	Yes; 1	Yes; HCS	^{—}	BNA
1994	War Paint	Lorrie Morgan	Landis' credits Full list: Track listing					7	48	—	—	Yes; 2	Yes; HCS	^{—}	BMG
1994	War Paint	Lorrie Morgan	66379-2	37:40	10	CD	Country	7	48	—	—	Yes; 2	Yes; HCS	^{—}	BMG
1994	Deep Thoughts from a Shallow Mind	Doug Supernaw	Landis' credits Full list: Track listing					48	—	19	—	—	—	^{—}	BNA
1994	Deep Thoughts from a Shallow Mind	Doug Supernaw	66396		10	CD	Country	48	—	19	—	—	—	^{—}	BNA
1995	Ready, Willing and Able	Daron Norwood	Landis' credits Full list: Track listing					—	—	—	—	Yes; 2	Yes; HCS	^{—}	Warner Bros.
1995	Ready, Willing and Able	Daron Norwood	24610	34:01	10	CD	Pop/Rock	—	—	—	—	Yes; 2	Yes; HCS	^{—}	Warner Bros.
1995	You Still Got Me	Doug Supernaw	Landis' credits Full list: Track listing					42	—	19	—	Yes; 3	Yes; HCS	^{—}	Warner Bros.
1995	You Still Got Me	Doug Supernaw	24639	38:14	11	CD	Country	42	—	19	—	Yes; 3	Yes; HCS	^{—}	Warner Bros.
1996	Trouble Free	Rhonda Vincent	Landis' credits Full list: Track listing					—	—	—	—	—	—	^{—}	Warner Bros.
1996	Trouble Free	Rhonda Vincent	24630	29:58	10	CD	Country	—	—	—	—	—	—	^{—}	Warner Bros.
1996	Tennessee Moon	Neil Diamond	Landis' credits Full list: Track listing					3	14	—	—	—	—	^{—}	Columbia
1996	Tennessee Moon	Neil Diamond	67382	67:41	18	CD	Country	3	14	—	—	—	—	^{—}	Columbia
1998	The Trouble with Angels	Juice Newton	Landis' credits Full list: Track listing					—	—	—	—	—	—	^{—}	River North
1998	The Trouble with Angels	Juice Newton	5141613612	39:44	10	CD	Country	—	—	—	—	—	—	^{—}	River North
1998	Secret Love	Lorrie Morgan	Landis' credits Full list: Track listing					36	—	—	—	—	—	^{—}	BNA
1998	Secret Love	Lorrie Morgan	67627	45:12	11	CD	Country	36	—	—	—	—	—	^{—}	BNA
1999	American Girl	Juice Newton	Landis' credits Full list: Track listing					—	—	—	—	—	—	^{—}	Renaissance
1999	American Girl	Juice Newton	176		12	CD	Country	—	—	—	—	—	—	^{—}	Renaissance
2003	I Want My Money Back	Sammy Kershaw	Landis' credits Full list: Track listing					39 (Note: Album peaked at #27 on the top independent charts; shown in the reference)	—	—	—	Yes; 2	Yes; HCS	^{—}	Audium/Koch
2003	I Want My Money Back	Sammy Kershaw	8167		11	CD	Country	39	—	—	—	Yes; 2	Yes; HCS	^{—}	Audium/Koch
2004	Show Me How	Lorrie Morgan	Landis' credits Full list: Track listing					49 (Note: Album reached #30 on the top independent hits chart shown in the reference.)	—	—	—	—	—	^{—}	Image Entertainment
2004	Show Me How	Lorrie Morgan	0609		11	CD	Country	49	—	—	—	—	—	^{—}	Image Entertainment
2005	Hot Apple Pie	Hot Apple Pie	Landis' credits Full list: Track listing					6	60	—	—	Yes; 3	Yes; HCS	^{—}	DreamWorks Nashville
2005	Hot Apple Pie	Hot Apple Pie	AAB000386602	47:25	13	CD	Country	6	60	—	—	Yes; 3	Yes; HCS	^{—}	DreamWorks Nashville
2009	Shea	Shea Fisher	Landis' credits Full list: Track listing					—	—	—	—	—	—	^{—}	ABC Music
2009	Shea	Shea Fisher	1797234	37:07	11	CD	Country	—	—	—	—	—	—	^{—}	ABC Music
2009	Hell of a Ride	Adam Brand	Landis' credits Full list: Track listing					—	—	—	—	Yes; 1	Yes; HCS	^{—}	Compass Brothers
2009	Hell of a Ride	Adam Brand	5616242	44:09	12	CD	Country	—	—	—	—	Yes; 1	Yes; HCS	^{—}	Compass Brothers
2010	Hurricane	Steve Forde	Landis' credits Full list: Track listing					—	—	—	—	—	—	^{—}	ABC
2010	Hurricane	Steve Forde	2747125	32:47	10	CD	Pop/Rock	—	—	—	—	—	—	^{—}	ABC

=== Compilation albums ===
==== Single artist sets ====
Year	Recording		Production information					Charts, Awards & Certifications							Label
Year	Recording		Production information					Album				Singles		^{A}&_{C}	Label
Year	Title	Artist	Catalog#	Time	Songs	Format	Genre	US TCA	US 200	Top HSA	Top PCA	Yes^{&no.}	Yes^{if}^{charted}	^{—}	Label
1980	Greatest Hits (EMI)	Kenny Rogers	Landis' credits Producer Full list: Brown Bannister Producer Milan Bogdan Digital Editing Roger Bowling Composer Larry Butler Producer David Foster Producer Rob Galbraith Producer Albhy Galuten Producer Barry Gibb Producer Jay Graydon Arranger, Producer Mary Hamilton Art Direction Kelly Junkermann Photography Richard Landis Producer Kyle Lehning Producer George Martin Arranger, Producer Glenn Meadows Mastering Kenny Mims Arranger, Producer Bob Morrison Composer Karl Richardson Producer Lionel Richie, Jr. Producer Kenny Rogers Producer Don Schlitz Composer Billy Edd Wheeler Composer J. Wilson Composer Track listing: 1. "The Gambler" (Schlitz); 2. "Lady" (Richie); 3. "Don't Fall in Love With a Dreamer" (Carnes, Ellingson); 4. "Ruby, Don't Take Your Love to Town (Tillis); 5. "She Believes in Me" (Gibb); 6. "Coward of the County" (Bowling, Wheeler); 7. "Lucille" (Bowling, Bynum); 8. "You Decorated My Life" (Hupp, Morrison); 9. "Reuben James" (Etris, Harvey); 10. "Love the World Away" (Morrison, Wilson); 11. "Every Time Two Fools Collide" (Dyes, Tweel); 12. "Long Arm of the Law" (Bowling, Wheeler)					1	1	—	—	Yes; 1	Yes; 2X	^{—}	EMI
1980	Greatest Hits (EMI)	Kenny Rogers	9056	42:35	12	LP/CD	Country	1	1	—	—	Yes; 1	Yes; 2X	^{—}	EMI
1984	Juice Newton's Greatest Hits (And More)	Juice Newton	Landis' credits Producer Full list: Charles Calello; Arranger; Richard Landis; Producer; Elliot Mazer; Producer; Juice Newton; Producer; John Palladino; Producer; Mark Peters; Arranger, director Barry Rudolph; Engineer; Wally Traugott; Remastering; Otha Young; Associate producer, producer Track listing: 1. "Angel of the Morning" (Taylor) 4:14; 2. "Heart of the Night" (Bettis, Clark) 4:08; 3. "Love's Been a Little Bit Hard on Me" (Burr) 3:15; 4. "Break It to Me Gently" (Lambert, Seneca) 4:03; 5. "Low Down and Lonesome" (Gillman, Newton, Young) 2:52; 6. "The Sweetest Thing (I've Ever Known)" (Young) 4:08; 7. "So Many Ways" (Stone) 2:56; 8. "Queen of Hearts" (DeVito) 3:26; 9. "Lay Back in the Arms of Someone" (Chapman, Chinn) 3:32; 10. "Hey| Baby" (Channel, Cobb) 3:09; 11. "Shot Full of Love" (McDill) 3:23; 12. "I'm Gonna Be Strong" (Mann, Weil) 3:39; 13. "It's a Heartache" (Scott, Wolfe) 3:30; 14. "Dirty Looks" (Robbins, Stephenson) 3:48; 15. "Tell Her No" (Argent) 3:36					64	178	—	—	Yes; 1	Yes; H100	^{—}	Liberty
1984	Juice Newton's Greatest Hits (And More)	Juice Newton	46489	53:50	15	CD	Country	64	178	—	—	Yes; 1	Yes; H100	^{—}	Liberty
1988	The Best of Stone Fury	Stone Fury	Landis' credits Producer Full list: Charles Brown; Composer; Dennis DeYoung; Composer; Bruce Gowdy; Composer, producer Andy Johns; Producer; Richard Landis; Producer; John Phillips; Composer; Lenny Wolf; Composer, producer Charles Calello; Arranger; Richard Landis; Producer; Elliot Mazer; Producer; Juice Newton; Producer; John Palladino; Producer; Mark Peters; Arranger, director Barry Rudolph; Engineer; Wally Traugott; Remastering; Otha Young; Associate producer, producer Track listing: 1. "Break Down the Walls"; 2. "Lies on the Run" (Gowdy, Wolf); 3. "Too Late" (Brown, Gowdy, Phillips, Wolf); 4. "Life Is Too Lonely"; 5. "Mama's Love"; 6. "Babe" (DeYoung, Gowdy, Wolf); 7. "Let Them Talk" (Gowdy, Wolf); 8. "Eye of the Storm" (Gowdy, Wolf); 9. "I Hate to Sleep Alone"; 10. "Shannon You Lose"					—	—	—	—	—	—	^{—}	MCA
1988	The Best of Stone Fury	Stone Fury	MCAD-42208		10	CD	Pop/Rock	—	—	—	—	—	—	^{—}	MCA
1988	Greatest Hits (RCA)	Kenny Rogers	Landis' credits Producer Full list: Brown Bannister Producer Milan Bogdan Digital Editing Larry Butler Producer David Foster Producer Rob Galbraith Producer Albhy Galuten Producer Barry Gibb Producer Jay Graydon Arranger, Producer Mary Hamilton Artwork Kelly Junkermann Photography Richard Landis Producer Kyle Lehning Producer George Martin Arranger, Producer Richard Marx Composer Bud McGuire Composer Kev McGuire Composer Glenn Meadows Mastering Kenny Mims Arranger, Producer Wood Newton Composer Michael Noble Composer Karl Richardson Producer Kenny Rogers Composer Michael Spriggs Composer Bruce Springsteen Composer Dan Tyler Composer Track listing: 1. "Islands in the Stream" (With Dolly Parton) (Barry Gibb/Robin Gibb/Maurice Gibb) (4:08); 2. "Crazy" (Richard Marx/Kenny Rogers) (3:40); 3. "Buried Treasure" (B. Gibb, R. Gibb, M. Gibb) (4:08); 4. "Twenty Years Ago" (Wood Newton/Michael Noble/Michael Spriggs/Dan Tyler) (3:44); 5. "I Don't Call Him Daddy" (Reed Nielsen) (4:06); 6. "I Prefer the Moonlight" (Gary Chapman/Mark Wright) (5:07); 7. "The Factory" (Kev McGuire/Bud McGuire) (3:18); 8. "She's Ready for Someone to Love Her" (Charlie Black/Jerry Gillespie/Tommy Rocco) (2:52); 9. "Make No Mistake, She's Mine" (With Ronnie Milsap) (Kim Carnes) (3:54); 10. "Morning Desire" (Dave Loggins) (4:08)					66	—	—	—	—	—	^{—}	RCA
1988	Greatest Hits (RCA)	Kenny Rogers	8371	39:05	10	CD	Country	66	—	—	—	—	—	^{—}	RCA
1995	Reflections: Greatest Hits	Lorrie Morgan	Landis' credits Full list: Track listing					5	46	—	—	Yes; 3	Yes; HCS	^{—}	BNA
1995	Reflections: Greatest Hits	Lorrie Morgan	07863665082	38:27	11	CD	Country	5	46	—	—	Yes; 3	Yes; HCS	^{—}	BNA
1995	Super Hits	Vince Gill	Landis' credits Full list: Track listing					—	—	—	—	—	—	^{—}	RCA
1995	Super Hits	Vince Gill	66944	37:33	10	CD	Country	—	—	—	—	—	—	^{—}	RCA
1995	Super Hits	Lorrie Morgan	Landis' credits Full list: Track listing					53	—	—	—	—	—	^{—}	BNA
1995	Super Hits	Lorrie Morgan	67632	32:58	10	CD	Country	53	—	—	—	—	—	^{—}	BNA
1998	The Essential Lorrie Morgan	Lorrie Morgan	Landis' credits Full list: Track listing					73	—	—	—	—	—	^{—}	BNA
1998	The Essential Lorrie Morgan	Lorrie Morgan	67622	56:32	16	CD	Country	73	—	—	—	—	—	^{—}	BNA
2002	RCA Country Legends	Lorrie Morgan	Landis' credits Full list: Track listing					—	—	—	—	—	—	^{—}	RCA
2002	RCA Country Legends	Lorrie Morgan	07863651112	54:48	16	CD	Country	—	—	—	—	—	—	^{—}	RCA
2002	Trapeze: The Collection	Tom Cochrane	Landis' credits Full list: Track listing					—	—	—	—	—	—	^{—}	EMI
2002	Trapeze: The Collection	Tom Cochrane	541754		37	CD	Pop/Rock	—	—	—	—	—	—	^{—}	EMI
2003	Platinum & Gold Collection	Vince Gill	Landis' credits Full list: Track listing					—	—	—	—	—	—	^{—}	RCA
2003	Platinum & Gold Collection	Vince Gill	82876542112	42:49	12	CD	Country	—	—	—	—	—	—	^{—}	RCA
2003	All American Country	Lorrie morgan	Landis' credits Full list: Track listing					—	—	—	—	Yes; 1	Yes; HCS	^{—}	BMG
2003	All American Country	Lorrie morgan	48217		10	CD	Country	—	—	—	—	Yes; 1	Yes; HCS	^{—}	BMG
2004	The Very Best of Peter Allen: The Boy from Down Under	Peter Allen	Landis' credits Full list: Track listing					—	—	—	—	—	—	^{—}	A&M
2004	The Very Best of Peter Allen: The Boy from Down Under	Peter Allen	5408272		20	CD	Vocal	—	—	—	—	—	—	^{—}	A&M
2011	The Ultimate Hits Collection	Juice Newton	Landis' credits Full list: Track listing					—	—	—	—	—	—	^{—}	The Fuel Label Group
2011	The Ultimate Hits Collection	Juice Newton	3020619902	74:33	20	CD	Country	—	—	—	—	—	—	^{—}	The Fuel Label Group

==== Multiple artist sets ====
Year	Recording		Production information					Charts, Awards & Certifications							Label
Year	Recording		Production information					Album				Singles		^{A}&_{C}	Label
Year	Title	Artist	Catalog#	Time	Songs	Format	Genre	US TCA	US 200	Top HSA	Top PCA	Yes^{&no.}	Yes^{if}^{charted}	^{—}	Label
1986	Greatest Greatest Hits	Various artists	Landis' credits Producer Full list: Alabama; Performer, producer Jerry Bridges; Producer; Bill Brunt; Art direction Tom Collins; Producer; Earl Thomas Conley; Performer, producer Tim DuBois; Composer, producer Rob Galbraith; Producer; Scott Hendricks; Producer; John Jarrard; Composer; Waylon Jennings; Performer; The Judds; Performer; Richard Landis; Producer; Nelson Larkin; Producer; Dave Loggins; Composer; Brent Maher; Producer; David Malloy; Producer; Ronnie Milsap; Performer, producer Juice Newton; Performer; Lisa Palas; Composer; Dolly Parton; Performer; Eddy Raven; Performer, producer Restless Heart; Performer; David Robbins; Composer; William Soule Robinson; Composer; Gary Scruggs; Producer; Harold Shedd; Producer; Van Stephenson; Composer; Sylvia; Performer; Paul Worley; Producer; Otha Young; Associate producer Track listing: 1. "There's No Way" (Alabama) 4:11; 2. "You Make Me Want to Make You Mine" Newton 3:46; 3. "She Keeps the Home Fires Burning" (Milsap) 3:55; 4. "Love Don't Care (Whose Heart It Breaks)" (Conley) 3:29; 5. "Love Is Alive" (Judds) 3:54; 6. "Let the Heartache Ride" (Restless Heart) 3:31; 7. "Operator, Operator" (Raven) 3:05; 8. "Don't Call It Love" (Parton) 3:15; 9. "Fallin' in Love" (Sylvia) 3:15; 10. "Drinkin' and Dreamin'" (Jennings) 3:00					—	—	—	—	—	—	^{—}	RCA
1986	Greatest Greatest Hits	Various artists	AHL1-7185	35:21	10	LP	Country	—	—	—	—	—	—	^{—}	RCA
1991	Texas State of Mind	Various artists	Landis' credits Full list: Track listing					—	—	—	—	—	—	^{—}	Liberty
1991	Texas State of Mind	Various artists	C2-95875	29:59	10	CD	Country	—	—	—	—	—	—	^{—}	Liberty
1992	Classic Rock Box: WNEW-FM 25th Anniversary Box	Various artists	Landis' credits Producer Full list: 10cc; Performer; Bryan Adams; Composer, performer John Alcock; Producer; The Allman Brothers Band; Performer; Ian Anderson; Composer, performer Jennie Anderson; Composer; Mike Appel; Producer; Roy Thomas Baker; Producer; Jeff Beck; Guitar, performer Ritchie Blackmore; Composer; Blue Öyster Cult; Performer; Niko Bolas; Producer; Bon Jovi; Performer; Jon Bon Jovi; Composer; Bono; Composer; Bruce Botnick; Producer; David Bowie; Performer; Bonnie Bramlett; Composer; Delaney Bramlett; Performer; Bruce Bromberg; Performer, producer Rush Brown; Producer; Terry Brown; Producer; The Cars; Performer; Manny Charlton; Producer; Eric Clapton; Composer, performer The Clash; Performer; Adam Clayton; Composer; Bob Clearmountain; Producer; Robert Cray; Performer; David Crosby; Producer; Crosby, Stills & Nash; Performer; Deep Purple; Performer; Def Leppard; Performer; Dire Straits; Performer; Tom Dowd; Producer; Gus Dudgeon; Producer; Bob Dylan; Performer; The Edge; Composer; Terry Ellis; Producer; Emerson, Lake & Palmer; Performer; Brian Eno; Producer; Melissa Etheridge; Performer; Bob Ezrin; Producer; Bruce Fairbairn; Producer; Mike Flicker; Producer; Peter Frampton; Performer; Andy Fraser; Composer; Free; Performer; Ian Gillan; Composer; David Gilmour; Producer; Roger Glover; Composer, performer Grand Funk Railroad; Performer; Bill Ham; Producer; Heart; Performer; INXS; Performer; Jimmy Iovine; Producer; Jethro Tull; Performer; Elton John; Performer; Mick Jones; Composer; Terry Knight; Producer; Mark Knopfler; Producer; Craig Krampf; Producer; Murray Krugman; Producer; Greg Lake; Performer; Jon Landau; Producer; Richard Landis; Producer; Robert John "Mutt" Lange; Producer; Daniel Lanois; Producer; Arthur Lee; Producer; Geddy Lee; Composer; John Lennon; Performer; Alex Lifeson; Composer; Love; Performer; David Lucas; Producer; Bob Marley; Performer; Bob Marley & the Wailers; Performer; George Martin; Producer; John Mayall; Performer; Kevin McCormick; Producer; John Mellencamp; Performer; Freddie Mercury; Performer; Mack Mercury; Producer; The Moody Blues; Performer; Larry Mullen, Jr.; Composer; Richard Mullen; Producer; Graham Nash; Performer; Nazareth; Performer; Keith Olsen; Producer; Yoko Ono; Performer; Sandy Pearlman; Producer; Neil Peart; Composer; Pink Floyd; Performer; The Police; Performer; Lou Reed; Performer; Paul Rodgers; Composer; Mick Ronson; Performer; Rush; Performer; Richie Sambora; Composer; Savoy Brown; Performer; Scorpions; Performer; Neil Slaven; Producer; Patti Smith Group; Performer; Bruce Springsteen; Performer; Guy Stevens; Producer; Stephen Stills; Performer; Joe Strummer; Composer; Thin Lizzy; Performer; Chris Thomas; Producer; Thunderclap Newman; Performer; Pete Townshend; Performer; Traffic; Performer; U2; Performer; Jim Vallance; Composer; Stevie Ray Vaughan; Performer; Tony Visconti; Producer; Roger Waters; Performer; Tom Wilson; Producer; Steve Winwood; Performer; ZZ Top; Performer Track listing Disc 1: 1. "Rebel Rebel" (Bowie) 4:28; 2. "What You Need" (Inxs) 3:35; 3. "While You See a Chance" (Winwood) 5:10; 4. "Lunatic Fringe" (Red Rider) 4:21; 5. "Pink Houses" (Mellencamp) 5:03; 6. "Walk on the Wild Side" (Reed) 4:13; 7. "Bad" (U2) 6:04; 8. "My Love Is Dangerous" (Mercury) 3:39; 9. "Because the Night" (Smith) 3:19; 10. "Do You Feel Like We Do" (Frampton) 13:45; 11. "Wind of Change" (Scorpions) 5:11; 12. "On Every Street" (Dire Straits) 5:01; Disc 2: 1. "Funeral for a Friend/Love Lies Bleeding" (John) 11:06; 2. "Let It Rain" (Clapton) 5:01; 3. "Suite: Judy Blue Eyes" (Crosby) 7:22; 4. "All Right Now" (Free) 5:32; 5. "Cause We've Ended as Lovers" (Beck) 5:41; 6. "Wanted Dead or Alive" (Bon Jovi) 5:07; 7. "Tell Mama" (Savoy Brown) 5:19; 8. "Love Hurts" (Nazareth) 3:51; 9. "Armageddon It" (Def Leppard) 5:20; 10. "Redemption Song: (Marley) 3:47; 11. "London Calling" (Clash) 3:20; 12. "(Don't Fear) The Reaper" (Blue Oyster Cult) 5:06; 13. "Comfortably Numb" (Pink Floyd) 6:20; Disc 3: 1. "Like a Rolling Stone" (Dylan) 6:08; 2. "Like the Way I Do" (Etheridge) 5:20; 3. "Planet of Women" (ZZ Top) 4:04; 4. "Statesboro Blues" (Allman Brothers) 4:10; 5. "The Spirit of Radio" (Rush) 4:57; 6. "Message in a Bottle" (Police) 4:46; 7. "I'm Not in Love" (Ten CC) 6:01; 8. "I Know You're Out There Somewhere" (Moody Blues) 6:37; 9. "Just What I Needed" (Cars) 3:42; 10. "Straight On" (Heart) 4:47; 11. "I'm Your Captain/Closer to Home" (Grand Funk Railroad) 9:51; 12. "You Set the Scene" (Love) 6:50; Disc 4: 1. "Thunder Road" (Springsteen) 4:47; 2. "Nobody Told Me" (Lennon) 3:34; 3. "Summer of '69" (Adams) 3:33; 4. "Smoking Gun" (Cray) 4:06; 5. "Pride and Joy" (Vaughan) 3:39; 6. "Aqualung" (Jethro Tull) 6:30; 7. "Knocking at Your Back Door" (Deep Purple) 7:02; 8. "The Low Spark of High Heeled Boys" (Traffic) 11:37; 9. "Room to Move" (Mayall) 4:57; 10. "The Boys Are Back in Town" (Thin Lizzy) 4:26; 11. "Lucky Man" (Emerson) 4:35; 12. "Something in the Air" (Thunderclap Newman) 3:54					—	—	—	—	—	—	^{—}	Polydor
1992	Classic Rock Box: WNEW-FM 25th Anniversary Box	Various artists	515913	266:34	49	CD	Pop/Rock	—	—	—	—	—	—	^{—}	Polydor
1996	The Essential Series Sampler	Various artists	Landis' credits Full list: Track listing					—	—	—	—	—	—	^{—}	RCA
1996	The Essential Series Sampler	Various artists	66818	59:48	20	CD	Country	—	—	—	—	—	—	^{—}	RCA
1996	80's Country: 1986-1988	Various artists	Landis' credits Full list: Track listing					—	—	—	—	—	—	^{—}	Simitar
1996	80's Country: 1986-1988	Various artists	5506	37:32	10	CD	Country	—	—	—	—	—	—	^{—}	Simitar
1997	Dick Bartley Presents Collector's Essentials on the Radio, Vol. 2: The '70s	Various artists	Landis' credits Full list: Track listing					—	—	—	—	—	—	^{—}	Varese
1997	Dick Bartley Presents Collector's Essentials on the Radio, Vol. 2: The '70s	Various artists	5847		14	CD	Pop/Rock	—	—	—	—	—	—	^{—}	Varese
1998	Ultimate Country Party	Various artists	Landis' credits Full list: Track listing					12	83	—	—	—	—	^{—}	Arista
1998	Ultimate Country Party	Various artists	18850	50:34	18	CD	Country	12	83	—	—	—	—	^{—}	Arista
1998	Classic Country, Vol. 1	Various artists	Landis' credits Full list: Track listing					—	—	—	—	—	—	^{—}	Renaissance
1998	Classic Country, Vol. 1	Various artists	401	61:08	19	CD	Country	—	—	—	—	—	—	^{—}	Renaissance
1999	Classic Country, Vol. 2	Various artists	Landis' credits Full list: Track listing					—	—	—	—	—	—	^{—}	Renaissance
1999	Classic Country, Vol. 2	Various artists	402	68:57	22	CD	Country	—	—	—	—	—	—	^{—}	Renaissance
2000	Original Hits: The Best of New Country	Various artists	Landis' credits Full list: Track listing					—	—	—	—	—	—	^{—}	St. Clair
2000	Original Hits: The Best of New Country	Various artists	1055		12	CD	Country	—	—	—	—	—	—	^{—}	St. Clair
2000	Original Hits: The Kings of New Country	Various artists	Landis' credits Full list: Track listing					—	—	—	—	—	—	^{—}	St. Clair
2000	Original Hits: The Kings of New Country	Various artists	1057		12	CD	Country	—	—	—	—	—	—	^{—}	St. Clair
2005	The Kings and Queens of Country	Various artists	Landis' credits Full list: Track listing					—	—	—	—	—	—	^{—}	Sony
2005	The Kings and Queens of Country	Various artists	ECD 3360		40	CD	Country	—	—	—	—	—	—	^{—}	Sony
2005	Classic Rock Gold	Various artists	Landis' credits Full list: Track listing					—	—	—	—	—	—	^{—}	Hip-O
2005	Classic Rock Gold	Various artists	4371		33	CD	Pop/Rock	—	—	—	—	—	—	^{—}	
2008	Boots, Buckles & Spurs: 50 Songs Celebrate 50 Years of Cowboy Tradition	Various artists	Landis' credits Full list: Track listing					—	—	—	—	—	—	^{—}	Sony BMG
2008	Boots, Buckles & Spurs: 50 Songs Celebrate 50 Years of Cowboy Tradition	Various artists	739838		50	CD	Country	—	—	—	—	—	—	^{—}	Sony BMG

=== Singles ===
==== Studio singles ====
Year	Recording		Charts, Awards & Certifications						Album
Year	Title	Artist	Hot 100	HOT MSR	AC SGLs	US HCS	HOT R&B	^{A}&_{C}	Album
1972	Natural Causes								
1972	Natural Causes	"Natural Causes"	—	—	40	—	—	^{—}	
1972	"Get Your Business Straight"	Albert Collins	—	—	—	—	46	^{—}	There's Gotta Be a Change
1981	"Pay You Back With Interest"	Gary O'	70	—	—	—	—	^{—}	Gary O
1981	"Angel Of The Morning"	Juice Newton	4	57	1	22	—	^{—}	Juice
1981	"Queen Of Hearts"	Juice Newton	2	—	2	14	—	^{—}	Juice
1982	"The Sweetest Thing (I've Ever Known)"	Juice Newton	7	—	1	1	—	^{—}	Juice
1983	"Dance Little Jean"	The Nitty Gritty Dirt Band	—	—	—	9	—	^{—}	Let's Go
1983	"Shot Full Of Love"	The Nitty Gritty Dirt Band	—	—	—	19	—	^{—}	Let's Go
1983	"Stranger At My Door"	Juice Newton	—	—	—	45	—	^{—}	Dirty Looks
1983	"Tell Her No"	Juice Newton	27	—	14	—	—	^{—}	Dirty Looks
1983	"Once Before I Go"	Peter Allen	—	—	26	—	—	^{—}	Not the Boy Next Door
1983	"You Haven't Heard The Last Of Me"	Peter Allen	—	—	15	—	—	^{—}	Not the Boy Next Door
1984	"Days Gone By"	Poco	80	—	—	—	—	^{—}	Inamorata
1984	"Modern Day Delilah"	Van Stephenson	22	—	—	—	—	^{—}	Righteous Anger
1984	"What The Big Girls Do"	Van Stephenson	45	—	—	—	—	^{—}	Righteous Anger
1986	"What Can I Do With My Heart"	Juice Newton	—	—	—	9	—	^{—}	Old Flame
1987	"I Prefer The Moonlight"	Kenny Rogers	—	—	—	2	—	^{—}	I Prefer the Moonlight
1987	"Make No Mistake, She's Mine"	Kenny Rogers	—	—	—	1	—	Grammy	I Prefer the Moonlight
1987	"The Factory"	Kenny Rogers	—	—	—	6	—	^{—}	I Prefer the Moonlight
1987	"Let s Do Something"	Vince Gill	—	—	—	16	—	^{—}	The Way Back Home
1988	"Everybody's Sweetheart"	Vince Gill	—	—	—	11	—	^{—}	The Way Back Home
1991	"A Picture Of Me (Without You)"	Lorrie Morgan	—	—	—	9	—	^{—}	Something in Red
1991	"We Both Walk"	Lorrie Morgan	—	—	—	3	—	^{—}	Something in Red
1991	"Hold On Partner"	Roy Rogers & The Sons of the Pioneers	—	—	—	42	—	^{—}	Tribute
1991	"Except For Monday"	Lorrie Morgan	—	—	—	4	—	^{—}	Something in Red
1992	"Something in Red"	Lorrie Morgan	—	—	—	14	—	^{—}	Something in Red
1992	"Watch Me"	Lorrie Morgan	—	—	—	2	—	^{—}	Watch Me
1992	"What Part Of No"	Lorrie Morgan	—	—	—	1	—	^{—}	Watch Me
1992	"I Guess You Had To Be There"	Lorrie Morgan	—	—	—	14	—	^{—}	Watch Me
1992	"Somebody s In Love"	Lisa Stewart	—	—	—	61	—	^{—}	Lisa Stewart
1993	"Drive Time"	Lisa Stewart	—	—	—	72	—	^{—}	Lisa Stewart
1993	"Honky Tonkin Fool"	Doug Supernaw	—	—	—	50	—	^{—}	Red and Rio Grande
1993	"I Don't Call Him Daddy"	Doug Supernaw	—	—	—	1	—	^{—}	Red and Rio Grande
1993	"Reno"	Doug Supernaw	—	—	—	4	—	^{—}	Red and Rio Grande
1993	"Red And Rio Grande"	Doug Supernaw	—	—	—	23	—	^{—}	Red and Rio Grande
1993	"Idle Hands"	Tim Ryan	—	—	—	71	—	^{—}	Idle Hands
1994	"If You Came Back From Heaven"	Lorrie Morgan	—	—	—	51	—	^{—}	War Paint
1994	"My Night To Howl"	Lorrie Morgan	—	—	—	31	—	^{—}	War Paint
1995	"Bad Dog, No Biscuit"	Daron Norwood	—	—	—	50	—	^{—}	Ready Willing and Able
1995	"My Girl Friday"	Daron Norwood	—	—	—	58	—	^{—}	Ready Willing and Able
1995	"Not Enough Hours In The Night"	Doug Supernaw	—	—	—	3	—	^{—}	You Still Got Me
1996	"She Never Looks Back"	Doug Supernaw	—	—	—	51	—	^{—}	You Still Got Me
1996	"You Still Got Me"	Doug Supernaw	—	—	—	53	—	^{—}	You Still Got Me
2005	"Hillbillies"	Hot Apple Pie	—	—	—	26	—	^{—}	Hot Apple Pie
2005	"We're Makin' Up"	Hot Apple Pie	—	—	—	54	—	^{—}	
2005	"Easy Does It"	Hot Apple Pie	—	—	—	50	—	^{—}	
2010	"Ready For Love"	Adam Brand	—	—	—	46	—	^{—}	Hell of a Ride

==== Compilation singles ====
Year	Recording		Charts, Awards & Certifications						Album
Year	Title	Artist	Hot 100	HOT MSR	AC SGLs	US HCS	HOT R&B	^{A}&_{C}	Album
1980	"Love The World Away"	Kenny Rogers	14	—	—	—	4	^{—}	Greatest Hits (EMI)
1984	"It's A Heartache"	Juice Newton	86	—	—	—	—	^{—}	Juice Newton's Greatest Hits (And More)
1985	"Crazy For You"	Madonna	1	—	2	—	80	^{—}	Vision Quest
1985	"Only the Young"	Journey	9	3	—	—	—	^{—}	Vision Quest
1994	"My Favorite Things"	Lorrie Morgan	—	—	—	64	—	^{—}	Merry Christmas from London
1995	"Back In Your Arms Again"	Lorrie Morgan	—	—	—	4	—	^{—}	Reflections: Greatest Hits
1995	"I Didn't Know My Own Strength"	Lorrie Morgan	—	—	—	1	—	^{—}	Reflections: Greatest Hits
1996	"Standing Tall"	Lorrie Morgan	—	—	—	32	—	^{—}	Reflections: Greatest Hits
1997	"Sleigh Ride"	Lorrie Morgan	—	—	—	42	—	^{—}	Merry Christmas from London
2003	"Do You Still Want To Buy Me That Drink (Frank)"	Lorrie Morgan	—	—	—	50	—	^{—}	All American Country

=== Soundtracks ===
Year	Recording		Production information					Charts, Awards & Certifications							Label
Year	Recording		Production information					Album				Singles		^{A}&_{C}	Label
Year	Title	Artist	Catalog#	Time	Songs	Format	Genre	US TCA	US 200	Top HSA	Top PCA	Yes^{&no.}	Yes^{if}^{charted}	^{—}	Label
1984	Wild Life	Various artists	Landis' credits Producer Full list: Bananarama; Performer; Charlotte Caffey; Performer; Peter Case; Performer; Cameron Crowe; Executive producer Hanover Fist; Don Gehman; Producer; Louise Goffin; Performer; Stacy Heydon; Producer; David Jerden; Producer; Steve Jolley; Producer; Donn Landee; Producer, score Richard Landis; Producer; Art Linson; Executive producer Charlie Sexton; Performer; Van Stephenson; Performer; Andy Summers; Performer, producer Tony Swain; Producer; The Three O'Clock; Performer; Eddie Van Halen; Performer, producer, score What Is This; Performer; Ron Wood; Performer, producer Track listing: 1. "Donut City" (Van Halen) 3:57; 2. "Metal of the Night" (Hanover Fist) 6:11; 3. "It's Not Easy" (Sexton, Wood) 3:19; 4. "Human Shout" (Summers Andy) 2:33; 5. "Wild Life" (Bananarama) 3:50; 6. "Mind My Still Have I" (What Is This) 2:59; 7. "Make It Glamorous" (Stephenson) 3:41; 8. "Who's Gonna Break the Ice" (Case) 4:21; 9. "I Go Wild" (The Three O’Clock) 3:01; 10. "No Trespassing" (Caffey, Goffin) 3:00					—	—	—	—	—	—	^{—}	MCA
1984	Wild Life	Various artists	MCA-27103	36:52	10	LP	Soundtrack	—	—	—	—	—	—	^{—}	MCA
1985	Fletch	Various artists	Landis' credits Producer Full list: Harold Faltermeyer; Performer, producer John Farnham; The Fixx; Dan Hartman; Producer; Rupert Hine; Producer; Dann Huff; Guitar; Richard Landis; Producer; Stephanie Mills; Kim Wilde; Marty Wilde; Producer; Ricki Wilde; Producer Track listing: 1. "Bit by Bit (Theme from Fletch)" 3:38; 2. Fletch, Get Outta Town" 4:11; 3. "Running for Love" 2:54; 4. "Name of the Game" 6:02; 5. "Fletch Theme" 3:48; 6. "A Letter to Both Sides" 3:20; 7. "Is It Over" 3:52; 8. "Diggin' In" 2:44; 9. "Exotic Skates" (Faltermeyer) 3:00; 10. "Running for Love" 2:44					—	—	—	—	—	—	^{—}	MCA
1985	Fletch	Various artists	MCA-6142	36:13	10	LP	Soundtrack	—	—	—	—	—	—	^{—}	MCA
1985	Secret Admirer	Various artists	Landis' credits Producer Full list: Richard Bosworth; Engineer, mixing engineer Rosemary Butler; Vincent Calloway; Producer; Tony Carey; Peter Collins; Producer; Don Felder; Producer; Jon Hammer; Producer; Peter Hauke; Producer; Nik Kershaw; Klymaxx; Russ Kunkel; Producer; Richard Landis; Producer; George Massenburg; Producer; Arnold McCuller; Bill Payne; Producer; Timothy B. Schmit; Producer; Van Stephenson; Mike Utley; Producer; Bo Watson; Producer Track listing: 1. "No Secrets; 2. "First Day of Summer"; 3. "Touch; 4. "She's Got a Part of Me"; 5. "You've Been Lied to Before"; 6. "Meeting in the Ladies Room"; 7. "You Might"; 8. "Just a Dream Away"; 9. "Leaving It up to You"; 10. "Finale"					—	—	—	—	—	—	^{—}	MCA
1985	Secret Admirer	Various artists	MCA-5611		10	LP	Soundtrack	—	—	—	—	—	—	^{—}	MCA
1985	Vision Quest	Various artists	Landis' credits Producer Full list: Peter Afterman; Coordination; Bob Badami; Technical advisor John Bettis; Composer; Stephen Bray; Arranger; Belinda Carlisle; Vocals (background); Joe Chiccarelli; Engineer, mixing, recording Bob Clearmountain; Mixing; Ronnie James Dio; Producer; Keith Elsen; Producer; Kevin Elson; Producer; Foreigner; Performer; Greg Fulginiti; Mastering; Neil Giraldo; Producer; Peter Guber; Executive producer Sammy Hagar; Performer, vocals Don Henley; Performer, producer, vocals Jellybean; Producer; Mick Jones; Producer; Journey; Performer; John Kalodner; Executive producer Danny Kortchmar; Producer; Greg Ladanyi; Producer; Richard Landis; Producer; Jon Lind; Composer; Madonna; Performer, vocals Ian McDonald; Producer; Rob Mounsey; Arranger; Keith Olsen; Producer; Jon Peters; Executive producer Red Rider; Performer; Debbie Reinberg; Coordination; Joel Sill; Executive in charge of music Mike Stoller; Composer; Mike "Clay" Stone; Producer; The Style Council; Performer; John Waite; Performer, vocals Paul Weller; Producer; Jane Wiedlin; Vocals (background) Track listing: 1. "Only the Young" (Journey) 4:01; 2. "Change" (Waite) 3:14; 3. "Shout to the Top" (Style Council) 4:18; 4. "Gambler" (Madonna) 3:54; 5. "She's on the Zoom" (Henley) 3:18; 6. "Hungry for Heaven" (Dio) 4:12; 7. "Lunatic Fringe" (Red Rider) 4:20; 8. "I'll Fall in Love Again" (Hagar) 4:11; 9. "Hot Blooded" (Foreigner) 4:24; 10. "Crazy for You" (Madonna) 4:08					—	11	—	—	Yes; 2	Yes; 4X	^{—}	DGC
1985	Vision Quest	Various artists	2-24063	40:24	10	CD	Soundtrack	—	11	—	—	Yes; 2	Yes; 4X	^{—}	DGC
1985	The Slugger's Wife	Various artists	Landis' credits Producer Full list: Tom Bahler; Producer; Glen Ballard; Producer; Jimmy Bowen; Producer; Jimmy Buffett; Peter Collins; Producer; Rebecca De Mornay; John Farnham; Don Felder; Producer; James Ingram; Quincy Jones; Producer; Nik Kershaw; Klymaxx; Richard Landis; Producer; Clif Magness; Producer; Stephen Shockley; Producer; Van Stephenson; Sarah Taylor; John Van Tongeren; Producer; Loudon Wainwright III; Brock Walsh; Producer; Neil Young; Composer Track listing: 1. "Oh Jimmy"; 2. "All American Boy"; 3. "Love (It's Just the Way It Goes)"; 4. "Human Racing"; 5. "Party Animal"; 6. "Men All Pause"; 7. "Hey, Hey, My, My"; 8. "Little Red Corvette"; 9. "Ragtop Day"; 10. "Wild Life"					—	—	—	—	—	—	^{—}	MCA
1985	The Slugger's Wife	Various artists	MCAC-5578		10	CD	Soundtrack	—	—	—	—	—	—	^{—}	MCA

=== Tribute albums ===
==== Tributes ====
Year	Recording		Production information					Charts, Awards & Certifications							Label
Year	Recording		Production information					Album				Singles		^{A}&_{C}	Label
Year	Title	Artist	Catalog#	Time	Songs	Format	Genre	US TCA	US 200	Top HSA	Top PCA	Yes^{&no.}	Yes^{if}^{charted}	^{—}	Label
1991	Tribute	Roy Rogers & The Sons of the Pioneers	Landis' credits Executive producer, producer Full list: Clint Black; Performer; Michael Black; Vocals (background); Charles Calello; Arranger; Jim Cottonl Engineer, mixing Glen Duncan; Fiddle; Dale Evans; Performer; Rob Feaster; Engineer; Robert Fletcher; Composer; Paul Franklin; Guitar (steel), lap steel guitar, pedabro Steve Gibson; Guitar (acoustic), guitar (electric); Emmylou Harris; Performer; Mitch Humphriesl Keyboards; David Hungate; Bass; The Kentucky Headhunters; Performer; Jana King; Vocals (background); Richard Landis; Executive producer, producer Paul Leim; Drums; Carl Marshl Synthesizer; Kathy Mattea; Performer; Mike McCarthy; Assistant engineer Joey Miskulin; Accordion; Lorrie Morgan; Performer; Willie Nelson; Performer; The Oak Ridge Boys; Performer; Cole Porter; Composer; Restless Heart; Performer; Dusty Rogers; Performer; Roy Rogers; Composer, guitar, vocals Brent Rowan; Guitar (electric); Rick Ruggieri; Engineer; Randee Saint Nicholas; Photography; Joe Scaife; Mixing; Lisa Silver; Vocals (background); Grahame Smith; Assistant engineer Ellis Tarrant; Composer; Karen Taylor-Good; Vocals (background); Randy Travis; Performer; Ricky Van Shelton; Performer; Hank Williams; Mastering; Marc Williams; Composer; Dennis Wilson; Vocals (background); Curtis Young; Vocals (background) Track listing: 1. "That's How the West Was Swung" (Pistilli, Seals) 3:10; 2. "Here's Hopin'" (Regan, Sanders) 2:56; 3. "Hold on Partner" (Paine, Paine) 2:00; 4. "Tumbling Tumbleweeds" (Nolan) 4:26; 5. "Little Joe, the Wrangler" (Tarrant, Williams) 2:45; 6. "When Payday Rolls Around" (Nolan) 2:17; 7. "Final Frontier" (Baird, DeVasure, Jones, Paul) 2:25; 8. "Don't Fence Me In" (Fletcher, Porter) 2:44; 9. "Rodeo Road" (Cannon, Shamblin) 2:21; 10. "Alive and Kickin'" (Rogers) 2:20; 11. "King of the Cowboys" (Carney, Rogers) 3:39; 12. "Happy Trails" (Evans) 3:21					17	113	—	—	Yes; 1	Yes; HCS	^{—}	RCA
1991	Tribute	Roy Rogers & The Sons of the Pioneers	3024-2-R	34:24	12	CD	Country	17	113	—	—	Yes; 1	Yes; HCS	^{—}	RCA
1994	Mama's Hungry Eyes: A Tribute to Merle Haggard	Various artists	Landis' credits Full list: Track listing					52	—	—	—	—	—	^{—}	Arista
1994	Mama's Hungry Eyes: A Tribute to Merle Haggard	Various artists	18760	50:17	13	CD	Country	52	—	—	—	—	—	^{—}	Arista

==== Tribute covers ====
Year	Recording		Production information					Charts, Awards & Certifications							Label
Year	Recording		Production information					Album				Singles		^{A}&_{C}	Label
Year	Title	Artist	Catalog#	Time	Songs	Format	Genre	US TCA	US 200	Top HSA	Top PCA	Yes^{&no.}	Yes^{if}^{charted}	^{—}	Label
1994	Common Thread: The Songs of the Eagles	Various artists	Landis' credits Full list: Track listing					1	3	—	—	Yes; 3	Yes; HCS	CMA	Warner Bros.
1994	Common Thread: The Songs of the Eagles	Various artists	24531	56:46	13	CD	Country	1	3	—	—	Yes; 3	Yes; HCS	CMA	Warner Bros.
1998	Double Barrel Country: The Legends of Country Music	Vince Gill	Landis' credits Full list: Track listing					—	—	—	—	—	—	^{—}	Madacy
1998	Double Barrel Country: The Legends of Country Music	Vince Gill	5336	34:06	10	CD	Country	—	—	—	—	—	—	^{—}	Madacy

=== Karaoke ===
Year	Recording		Production information					Charts, Awards & Certifications							Label
Year	Recording		Production information					Album				Singles		^{A}&_{C}	Label
Year	Title	Artist	Catalog#	Time	Songs	Format	Genre	US TCA	US 200	Top HSA	Top PCA	Yes^{&no.}	Yes^{if}^{charted}	^{—}	Label
2002	Sing Women of Country	Various artists	Landis' credits Composer Full list: Michael Anderson; Composer; Bert Berns; Composer; Gary Burr; Composer; Doug Crider; Composer; Chapin Hartford; Composer; Harlan Howard; Composer; Marry Anne Kennedy; Composer; Kostas; Composer; Richard Landis; Composer; Paul McCartney; Composer; Lorrie Morgan; Composer; Reed Nielsen; Composer; Gretchen Peters; Composer; Jerry Ragovoy; Composer; Matt Rollings; Composer; Pamela Rose; Composer; Bert Russell; Composer; Randy Sharp; Composer; Frank Wildhorn; Composer Track listing: 1. "Independence Day" 3:36; 2. "My Baby Loves Me" 2:45; 3. "Safe in the Arms of Love" 3:17; 4. "Except For Monday" 3:05; 5. "Letting Go" 4:16; 6. "Shake the Sugar Tree" 3:30; 7. "Maybe It Was Memphis" 3:50; 8. "Not Too Much to Ask" 3:42; 9. "If You Came Back From Heaven" 3:45; 10. "Piece of My Heart" 4:13; 11. "Standing Right Next to Me" 3:55; 12. "If I'm Not in Love" 3:53; 13. "I Try to Think About Elvis" 3:01; 14. "You Will" 3:27; 15. "Blame It on Your Heart" 3:41					—	—	—	—	—	—	^{—}	Priddis
2002	Sing Women of Country	Various artists	9018	53:56	15	LP	Karaoke	—	—	—	—	—	—	^{—}	Priddis
2004	Chartbuster Karaoke: Lorrie Morgan, Vol. 1	Various artists	Landis' credits Composer Full list: Michael Anderson; Composer; Bert Berns; Composer; Gary Burr; Composer; Doug Crider; Composer; Chapin Hartford; Composer; Harlan Howard; Composer; Marry Anne Kennedy; Composer; Kostas; Composer; Richard Landis; Composer; Paul McCartney; Composer; Lorrie Morgan; Composer; Reed Nielsen; Composer; Gretchen Peters; Composer; Jerry Ragovoy; Composer; Matt Rollings; Composer; Pamela Rose; Composer; Bert Russell; Composer; Randy Sharp; Composer; Frank Wildhorn; Composer Track listing: 1. "Independence Day" 3:36; 2. "My Baby Loves Me" 2:45; 3. "Safe in the Arms of Love" 3:17; 4. "Except For Monday" 3:05; 5. "Letting Go" 4:16; 6. "Shake the Sugar Tree" 3:30; 7. "Maybe It Was Memphis" 3:50; 8. "Not Too Much to Ask" 3:42; 9. "If You Came Back From Heaven" 3:45; 10. "Piece of My Heart" 4:13; 11. "Standing Right Next to Me" 3:55; 12. "If I'm Not in Love" 3:53; 13. "I Try to Think About Elvis" 3:01; 14. "You Will" 3:27; 15. "Blame It on Your Heart" 3:41					—	—	—	—	—	—	^{—}	Chartbuster; Karaoke
2004	Chartbuster Karaoke: Lorrie Morgan, Vol. 1	Various artists	90023	53:01	15	CD	Country	—	—	—	—	—	—	^{—}	Chartbuster; Karaoke

=== Holiday albums ===
Year	Recording		Production information					Charts, Awards & Certifications							Label
Year	Recording		Production information					Album				Singles		^{A}&_{C}	Label
Year	Title	Artist	Catalog#	Time	Songs	Format	Genre	US TCA	US 200	Top HSA	Top PCA	Yes^{&no.}	Yes^{if}^{charted}	^{—}	Label
1993	Merry Christmas from London	Lorrie Morgan	Landis' credits Producer Full list: Adolphe Adam; Composer; Ruven Afanador; Photography; Robert Arthur; Composer; Allison Brown; Production assistant Charles Calello; Arranger, conductor, orchestration Joe Chiccarelli; Engineer; Katherine DeVault; Art direction, design John Sullivan Dwight; Composer; David Hall; Mixing assistant David Katz; Musical director, violin Richard Landis; Producer; Richard Lousey; Engineer; Carl Marsh; Fairlight; Johnny Mathis; Performer; Johnny "Country" Mathis; Guest appearance, vocals Lorrie Morgan; Vocals; New World Philharmonic; Orchestra; P.D.; Composer; Csaba Petocz; Engineer, mixing Franz Schubert; Composer; Patrick Swan; Hair stylist, make-up Traditional; Composer; Craig White; Assistant Engineer; Andy Williams; Performer; Hank Williams; Mastering; Tammy Wynette; Guest appearance, performer, vocals Track listing: 1. "My Favorite Things" (Hammerstein, Rodgers) 3:46; 2. "A Christmas Festival Medley: Jingle Bells/God Rest Ye Merry Gentlemen" 8:52; 3. "Little Snow Girl" (Arthur) 3:54; 4. "Up on Santa Claus Mountain" (Morgan) 4:12; 5. "O Holy Night" (Adam, Dwight) 3:14; 6. "Let It Snow| Let It Snow| LetIt Snow|" (Cahn, Styne) 2:33; 7. "Blue Snowfall" (Colman) 3:55; 8. "Toyland" (Traditional) 3:30; 9. "Sleigh Ride" (Anderson, Parish) 3:08; 10. "Ave Maria" (PD, Schubert) 4:57					26	115	—	—	Yes; 2	Yes; HCS	^{—}	BMG
1993	Merry Christmas from London	Lorrie Morgan	66282-2	41:45	10	CD	Country	26	115	—	—	Yes; 2	Yes; HCS	^{—}	BMG
1995	Country Christmas Eve	The Oak Ridge Boys	Landis' credits Full list: Track listing					—	—	—	—	—	—	^{—}	Capitol
1995	Country Christmas Eve	The Oak Ridge Boys	32585		10	CD	Country	—	—	—	—	—	—	^{—}	Capitol
1995	The Best of Country Christmas, Vol. 5	Various artists	Landis' credits Full list: Track listing					—	—	—	—	—	—	^{—}	RCA
1995	The Best of Country Christmas, Vol. 5	Various artists	66753	34:56	11	CD	Country	—	—	—	—	—	—	^{—}	RCA
1996	Holiday Belles	Various artists	Landis' credits Full list: Track listing					—	—	—	—	—	—	^{—}	St. Clair
1996	Holiday Belles	Various artists	35712		10	CD	Holiday	—	—	—	—	—	—	^{—}	St. Clair
1998	Country Christmas Classics	Various artists	Landis' credits Full list: Track listing					50	—	—	—	—	—	^{—}	RCA
1998	Country Christmas Classics	Various artists	07863676982	35:31	11	CD	Country	50	—	—	—	—	—	^{—}	RCA
2004	Country Christmas: A Christmas Welcome Thomas Kinkade	Thomas Kinkade	Landis' credits Producer Full list: Adolphe Adam; Composer; Ruven Afanador; Photography; Robert Arthur; Composer; Allison Brown; Production assistant Charles Calello; Arranger, conductor, orchestration Joe Chiccarelli; Engineer; Katherine DeVault; Art direction, design John Sullivan Dwight; Composer; David Hall; Mixing assistant David Katz; Musical director, violin Richard Landis; Producer; Richard Lousey; Engineer; Carl Marsh; Fairlight; Johnny Mathis; Performer; Johnny "Country" Mathis; Guest appearance, vocals Lorrie Morgan; Vocals; New World Philharmonic; Orchestra; P.D.; Composer; Csaba Petocz; Engineer, mixing Franz Schubert; Composer; Patrick Swan; Hair stylist, make-up Traditional; Composer; Craig White; Assistant Engineer; Andy Williams; Performer; Hank Williams; Mastering; Tammy Wynette; Guest appearance, performer, vocals Track listing: 1. "My Favorite Things" (Hammerstein, Rodgers) 3:46; 2. "A Christmas Festival Medley: Jingle Bells/God Rest Ye Merry Gentlemen" 8:52; 3. "Little Snow Girl" (Arthur) 3:54; 4. "Up on Santa Claus Mountain" (Morgan) 4:12; 5. "O Holy Night" (Adam, Dwight) 3:14; 6. "Let It Snow| Let It Snow| LetIt Snow|" (Cahn, Styne) 2:33; 7. "Blue Snowfall" (Colman) 3:55; 8. "Toyland" (Traditional) 3:30; 9. "Sleigh Ride" (Anderson, Parish) 3:08; 10. "Ave Maria" (PD, Schubert) 4:57					43 (Note: Album reached #23 on the "Top Christian Albums" and #21 on the "Top Independent Albums" charts.)	—	—	—	—	—	^{—}	Madacy Entertainment
2004	Country Christmas: A Christmas Welcome Thomas Kinkade	Thomas Kinkade	50357		10	CD	Holiday/religious	43	—	—	—	—	—	^{—}	Madacy Entertainment
2005	Holiday Cheer	North Star Artists	Landis' credits Full list: Track listing					—	—	—	—	—	—	^{—}	St. Clair
2005	Holiday Cheer	North Star Artists	45846		10	CD	Holiday	—	—	—	—	—	—	^{—}	St. Clair
2007	Home for the Holidays	Various artists	Landis' credits Full list: Track listing					—	—	—	—	—	—	^{—}	St. Clair
2007	Home for the Holidays	Various artists	35702		10	CD	Holiday	—	—	—	—	—	—	^{—}	St. Clair
2007	Christmas with Carnie	Carnie Wilson	Landis' credits Full list: Track listing					—	—	—	—	—	—	^{—}	B3E
2007	Christmas with Carnie	Carnie Wilson	368112		12	CD	Holiday	—	—	—	—	—	—	^{—}	B3E

=== Box sets ===
Year	Recording		Production information					Charts, Awards & Certifications							Label
Year	Recording		Production information					Album				Singles		^{A}&_{C}	Label
Year	Title	Artist	Catalog#	Time	Songs	Format	Genre	US TCA	US 200	Top HSA	Top PCA	Yes^{&no.}	Yes^{if}^{charted}	^{—}	Label
1995	Ghost Town/Inamorata	Poco	Landis' credits Full list: Track listing					—	—	—	—	—	—	^{—}	Rhino
1995	Ghost Town/Inamorata	Poco	66282-2		21	CD	Pop/Rock	—	—	—	—	—	—	^{—}	Rhino
2006	Juice/Quiet Lies	Juice Newton	Landis' credits Full list: Track listing					—	—	—	—	—	—	^{—}	Collectables
2006	Juice/Quiet Lies	Juice Newton	2918		20	CD	Country	—	—	—	—	—	—	^{—}	Collectables
2007	Old Flame/Dirty Looks	Juice Newton	Landis' credits Full list: Track listing					—	—	—	—	—	—	^{—}	Raven
2007	Old Flame/Dirty Looks	Juice Newton	256	76:34	21	CD	Country	—	—	—	—	—	—	^{—}	Raven
2010	The Music of Ronnie Milsap	Ronnie Milsap	Landis' credits Full list: Track listing					—	—	—	—	—	—	^{—}	RCA
2010	The Music of Ronnie Milsap	Ronnie Milsap	76096	161:45	45	CD	Country	—	—	—	—	—	—	^{—}	RCA
2011	Juice/Quiet Lies/Dirty Looks	Juice Newton	Landis' credits Full list: Track listing					—	—	—	—	—	—	^{—}	Beat Goes On
2011	Juice/Quiet Lies/Dirty Looks	Juice Newton	BGO999	109:58	30	CD	Country	—	—	—	—	—	—	^{—}	Beat Goes On

=== Gospel ===
Year	Recording		Production information					Charts, Awards & Certifications							Label
Year	Recording		Production information					Album				Singles		^{A}&_{C}	Label
Year	Title	Artist	Catalog#	Time	Songs	Format	Genre	US TCA	US 200	Top HSA	Top PCA	Yes^{&no.}	Yes^{if}^{charted}	^{—}	Label
2006	Old Time Gospel Favorites	Various artists	Landis' credits Full list: Track listing					—	—	—	—	—	—	^{—}	Madacy
2006	Old Time Gospel Favorites	Various artists	52104	140:26	50	CD	Religious	—	—	—	—	—	—	^{—}	Madacy
