= Two Souls =

Two Souls may refer to:

== Culture ==
- Two-Spirits, an umbrella term sometimes used for what was once commonly known as berdaches
- The Two Souls of Socialism, a socialist pamphlet that posits a fundamental division in socialist thought and action

== Media ==
- Two Souls in One, a debut album by American saxophonist George Braith recorded in 1963
- Beyond: Two Souls, a 2013 interactive drama action-adventure video game

== See also ==
- Iruvar Ullam (disambiguation), title of various Indian films, literally Two Souls
