= Knave of Hearts =

Knave of Hearts may refer to:

- The Jack of Hearts in a deck of playing cards
- The Knave of Hearts, a recurring character in the American television show Once Upon a Time in Wonderland
- Knave of Hearts (Alice's Adventures in Wonderland), a character in Lewis Carroll's Alice's Adventures in Wonderland
- The Knave of Hearts (1925 book), a 1925 illustrated children's book by Louise Saunders with pictures by Maxfield Parrish
- The Knave of Hearts (1950 novel), a 1950 novel by Barbara Cartland, see Barbara Cartland bibliography
- The Knave of Hearts (1962 novel), a 1962 novel by Elizabeth Linington
- "Knave of Hearts" (novello), a music composition by Arthur Somervell
- The Knave of Hearts (1919 film), a 1919 British silent romance film
- Knave of Hearts (film), a 1954 film directed by René Clément
- Knave of Hearts (Martian area), an informal name for the area of Mars being explored by the spacecraft Phoenix

== See also ==
- Jack of Hearts (disambiguation)
- Queen of Hearts (disambiguation)
- King of Hearts (disambiguation)
- Hearts (disambiguation)
- Knave (disambiguation)
