= Lalita Iyer =

Indian author, journalist, and columnist

- Occupations: Author, journalist, columnist
- Writing career
- Language: English
- Notable works: I'm Pregnant, Not Terminally Ill, You Idiot! The Whole Shebang: Sticky Bits of Being a Woman; Sridevi: Queen of Hearts

Lalita Iyer is an Indian author, journalist, and columnist based in Mumbai, India. She has written several books, including I'm Pregnant, Not Terminally Ill, You Idiot!, The Whole Shebang: Sticky Bits of Being a Woman, and Sridevi: Queen of Hearts. She has also written children's literature and is the author of the blogs Chickwit and Mommygolightly.

== Early life and education ==
She graduated from the Institute of Chemical Technology, Mumbai (formerly, UDCT Mumbai), with an M.Pharm in Medicinal and Natural Products (pharmacognosy). By 2019, she completed a post-graduate diploma in Dance Movement Therapy from the Tata Institute of Social Sciences.

== Career ==
Iyer began her career as a pharmacist. Her work as a journalist includes writing about parenting as a columnist for the Indian Express, working as a Deputy Editor at the Hindustan Times, and serving as Managing Editor of Filmfare magazine. She also authored two blogs. Chickwit began as a column in the Hindustan Times and Mommygolightly related to motherhood. She has also been an educator at the Sahyadri School in Pune and the Akshara School in Mumbai.

Her first book, I’m Pregnant, Not Terminally Ill, You Idiot! (2013) and The Whole Shebang: Sticky Bits of Being a Woman (2017), both offer advice based on her personal experience. Her biography of Sridevi, titled Sridevi: Queen of Hearts, was released in 2018. She has also written two books for children: The Boy Who Swallowed a Nail and Other Stories (2016) and Thatha's Pumpkin (2020).

In 2018, she wrote a post for the "Happily Unmarried" awareness campaign on social media by the Majlis Legal Centre, describing an overview of her career, dating, marriage, and single motherhood.

== Critical reception ==
=== I’m Pregnant, Not Terminally Ill, You Idiot! ===
Shriya Mohan writes for The Hindustan Times that the book "feels like a gush of fresh air inside a vacuum of Indian books on pregnancy" and "Iyer tells you the inside stuff nobody is willing to reveal, shocking you, making you laugh and preparing you for the tough battles ahead — the pregnancy fellowship programme, the birth mutiny, work bitches, the myth of the hands-on-daddy, boob wars and the total loss of privacy, the sisterhood of over competitive mommies, and most important of all, how to keep your head above water amidst all this madness." In The Indian Express, Lehar Kala writes, "Read I'm Pregnant, Not Terminally Ill, You Idiot! for a lark, as long as you remember that focusing entirely on pregnancy and birth still doesn't prepare you for the arrival of the infant, which is when the real work begins." In The Hindu, Julie Merin Varughese describes the book as "a laugh-fest that bailed me out of some particularly turbulent times in my own pregnancy."

=== The Whole Shebang: Sticky Bits of Being a Woman ===
In ThePrint, Sabah K writes, "Setting off on a conversational tone, the book makes the reader see themselves through the life journey of the author (and society's constructs of "womanhood") – as she navigates periods, work, friendships, sex, marriage and motherhood", and "the chapters on friendships, finance, and sex make for good standalone reads, with their lucid and honest advice and pointers that hit home." Neha Bhatt writes in Scroll.in, "Having struck out on her own decades ago, gone job-hopping every few years, dating both kinds of men – shampoos and conditioners (read the book to find out what that means!) – finding "the one" later than most others around her and then losing him to find herself while making solo parenting work, gives her story many layers with rough edges, never really treading the conventional line." According to Julie Merin Varughese in The Hindu, "it seems a little counter-productive to hear a strong, modern woman like Iyer go on and on about breasts and waist and a** even though her point finally may be that she has made peace with her body issues."

=== Sridevi: Queen of Hearts ===
According to Latha Venkatraman of The Deccan Herald, this biography of Indian actress Sridevi "gently tracks Sridevi’s journey through her film career in a journalistic way, basically encapsulating the events in the actor's life as they unfolded." In Firstpost, Gautam Chintamani writes, "Iyer does bring out the socio-political scenario both within the country as well as the industry that helped in creating the aura surrounding Sridevi" and "There is definitely more to Sridevi both professionally as well as personally than what met the eye, and even though Iyer more than hints at that, the latter more than the former, one wished the book scratched a little more." Lamat R Hasan, writing for The Hindustan Times, states, "Iyer's done a good job, but someone needs to take off from here as Sridevi deserves a richer tribute, one that helps understand the iconic Miss Hawa Hawai's pan-India appeal, one that decodes the real Sridevi, the scars of a childhood denied, of body shaming, and the obsession to stay fit and beautiful well after she had stepped into her 50s."

== Selected works ==
- I’m Pregnant, Not Terminally Ill, You Idiot!, Manjul Publishing, 2013, ISBN 9789381506301
- The Boy Who Swallowed a Nail and Other Stories, Scholastic India, 2016, ISBN 9789385887260
- The Whole Shebang: Sticky Bits of Being a Woman, Bloomsbury Publishing, 2017, ISBN 9789386432278
- Sridevi: Queen of Hearts, Westland Publications, 2018, ISBN 9789387578593
- Thatha's Pumpkin, Karadi Tales, 2020, ISBN 9788193903377
