= Iruvar Ullam =

Iruvar Ullam (lit. 'Two Souls' or 'Two Hearts') may refer to:

- Iruvar Ullam (1963 film), an Indian Tamil-language romance film by L. V. Prasad
- Iruvar Ullam (2021 film), an Indian Tamil-language family drama film

== See also ==
- Two Souls (disambiguation)
- Two Hearts (disambiguation)
