= Lisa Stewart (album) =

Studio album by Lisa Stewart
- Released: January 1993
- Genre: Country
- Length: 33:38 (CD); 30:10 (cassette)
- Label: BNA
- Producer: Richard Landis

Lisa Stewart is the only album by American country music artist Lisa Stewart. It was released in January 1993 via BNA Records. The album includes the singles "Somebody's in Love", "Under the Light of the Texaco" and "Drive Time".

== Critical reception ==
Entertainment Weekly critic Alanna Nash gave the album a C− rating, referring to it as the "Crystal Gayle brand of gooey ear candy." Neil Pond of Country America magazine gave a favorable review, saying that the album's production recalled the Nashville sound of the 1960s, and that Stewart "is one talented singer who knows how to reconcile the anchor of tradition with the tide of progress."

== Track listing ==
1. "Somebody's in Love" (Steve Bogard, Michael Clark) – 3:31
2. "Drive Time" (Annette Cotter, Kim Tribble) – 3:35
3. "Don't Touch Me" (Hank Cochran) – 3:02
4. "Under the Light of the Texaco" (Kye Fleming, Janis Ian) – 3:42
5. "Old-Fashioned Broken Heart" (Donny Kees, Terri Sharp) – 3:32
6. "If I Was Her" (Lisa Angelle) – 3:29
7. "Forgive and Forget" (Angelle, Reed Nielsen) – 3:11
8. "That Makes One of Us" (Rick Bowles, Barbara Wyrick) – 3:17
9. "There Goes the Neighborhood" (Ron Hellard, Tom Shapiro) – 2:51
10. "Is It Love" (Gidget Baird, Byron Gallimore, Don Pfrimmer) – 3:28

"Is It Love" is omitted from the cassette version.

== Personnel ==
As listed in liner notes.

- Glen Duncan – fiddle
- Jim Ferguson – background vocals
- Sonny Garrish – pedal steel guitar
- Steve Gibson – electric guitar
- Sherri Huffman – background vocals
- Mitch Humphries – keyboards
- John Barlow Jarvis – keyboards
- Jana King – background vocals
- Mike Lawler – synthesizer
- Paul Leim – drums, percussion
- Craig Nelson – acoustic bass guitar
- Brent Rowan – electric guitar
- Lisa Silver – background vocals
- Lisa Stewart – lead vocals
- Diane Vanette – background vocals
- Billy Joe Walker, Jr. – acoustic guitar
- Bergen White – background vocals
- Dennis Wilson – background vocals
- Glenn Worf – bass guitar
- Curtis Young – background vocals

Strings performed by the Nashville String Machine, conducted by Carl Gorodetzky and arranged by Charles Calello.

== Singles ==
Year	Single	Peak chart positions	
Year	Single	US Country	CAN Country
1992	"Somebody's in Love"	61	—
1993	"Under the Light of the Texaco"	—	—
1993	"Drive Time"	72	60
"—" denotes releases that did not chart
