= Sridevi: Queen of Hearts =

2018 biography of Sridevi

- Author: Lalita Iyer
- Language: English
- Subject: Biography
- Genre: Nonfiction
- Published: 22 October 2018
- Publisher: Westland Books
- Publication place: India
- Media type: Hardcover
- Pages: 184
- ISBN: 978-9387578593

Sridevi: Queen of Hearts is an unofficial biography of Sridevi by Lalita Iyer.

== Background ==
In a journalistic manner, the book follows Sridevi's path through her cinematic career. It does so in a way that encapsulates the events in the actor's life as they transpired. As the story progresses, it jumps back and forth in time to examine various aspects of her life.

== Reception ==
Gautam Chintamani, a film historian, writes in his review at Firstpost; "[The book] manages to steer clear of maintaining this balance and wonderful as that is, the book ends up being about what Sridevi means to most of her fans than what it meant to be Sridevi."

In a review for The Times of India, Rachana Dubey writes, "The author has approached the book as an unauthorised biography that analyses and underlines the contribution Sridevi made to cinema across languages."
