= St. Clair Entertainment Group =

Discount music distributor

The St. Clair Entertainment Group is a discount distributor of music and entertainment CDs and DVDs.

== History ==
St. Clair Entertainment Group was founded in 1985 as a distributor of music special products in Canada. It has corporate offices and representation in Atlanta, Dallas, Detroit, Los Angeles, Miami, Minneapolis, Montreal, New York, Seattle, Toronto and Vancouver. While the company's corporate head office is located in the Woodland Hills district of Los Angeles, its principal operations are in Montreal, Quebec, Canada.

St. Clair Entertainment is a significant distributor of films and television series for which copyright has expired or which was imperfected, resulting in the film or television series being in the public domain. Recent releases by St. Clair Entertainment include Quicksand (1950; released in 2007), D.O.A. (1950; released in 2008) and The Lucy Show (1962; released in 2008).

St. Clair Entertainment also has released a number of CDs of artists where the recordings have been acquired under license or are in the public domain. Recent releases include collections by John Lee Hooker, Bob Marley and Ray Charles, as well as country artists Patsy Cline, Roger Miller and Waylon Jennings. In the late 1990s, through licenses from such blues labels as Alligator Records, St. Clair Entertainment released a Celebration of the Blues series of CDs, which included such performers as Johnny Winter, Amos Garrett, Norton Buffalo, Buddy Guy, Charlie Musselwhite, Freddie King, James Cotton, King Biscuit Boy, Junior Wells and Katie Webster. The company also has released a number of live performance DVDs, including artists James Brown, Level 42 and Luciano Pavarotti.

The company is also involved in the direct distribution of new music. For example, in 2006, St. Clair Entertainment became the exclusive distributor for Aura Records, the record label owned by Tommy James. Through this agreement, St. Clair Entertainment distributed James' Hold the Fire album, released in 2006.

== Celebration of the Blues ==
This series of albums included:

- A Celebration of The Blues: Great Blues Harp
- A Celebration of The Blues: Great Blues Piano
- A Celebration of The Blues: Great Slide Guitar
- A Celebration of The Blues: Great Party Blues
- A Celebration of The Blues: Great Blues Ballads

== Copyright issues ==
St. Clair has been accused of violating copyrights related to Alvin and the Chipmunks (Bagdasarian Productions, LLC v. St. Clair Entertainment Group, Inc., CV 08-07525 FMC (C.D. Cal. 2008)), Sonia Smith (Sonia Smith v. St. Clair Entertainment Group, Inc and ARC Music Inc. (E.D. Tex. 2005–06)), and Willie Nelson and others (Kenneth R. Bennett v. St. Clair Entertainment Group Inc. (M.D. Tenn, filed 2008)). In the case of Melanie O'Reilly versus St Clair, St Clair failed even to show up in court in repeated hearings, and thus conceded a default judgment.
