= Lisa Stewart =

American singer-songwriter

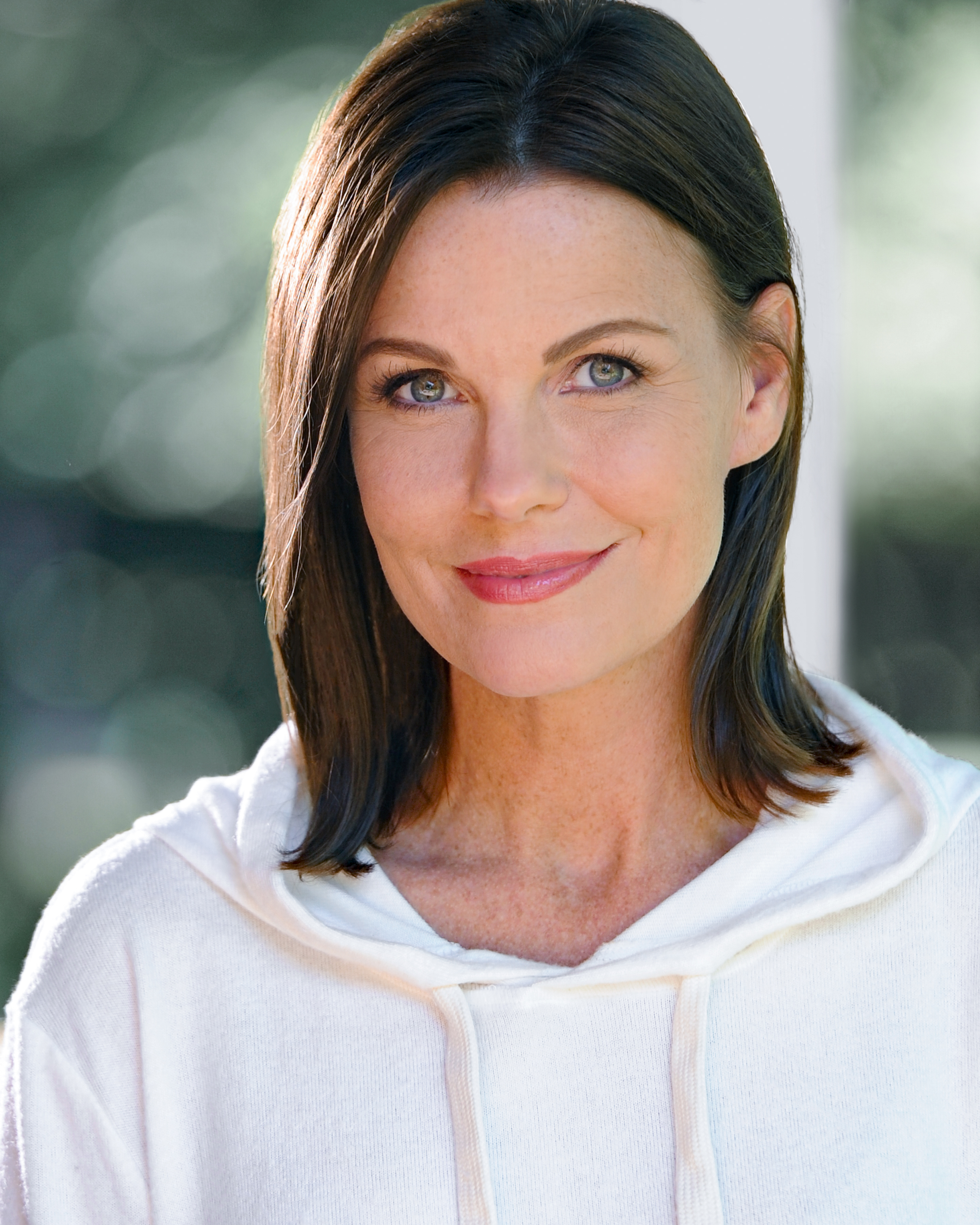
- Photo: Barb Jones

Background information
- Born: August 6, 1968 (age 57)
- Origin: Louisville, Mississippi, United States
- Genres: Country, Blues, Jazz
- Occupation: Singer
- Instrument: Vocals
- Years active: 1993
- Label: BNA

Lisa Stewart (born August 6, 1968) is an American country music and jazz artist, actress, and television host. In 1991, she signed to BNA Records (then known as BNA Entertainment), releasing her self-titled debut album that year. This album produced two singles for her on the Billboard Hot Country Songs chart. Stewart is a BMI Award winning songwriter and has appeared in films alongside Oscar winners Gwynneth Paltrow and Melissa Leo. She currently tours with her jazz combo.

== Life and career ==
Stewart was born August 6, 1968, in Louisville, Mississippi. She first sang in public at age six in her church. Five years later, she attended a Tent Show at the Nashville Fan Fair, where she gave her first country performance. By 1987, Stewart had moved to Nashville, Tennessee, where she won the Roy Acuff scholarship at Belmont University and found work as a studio singer.

While performing at a wedding reception in 1991, Stewart was noticed by Mark Thompson, Wynonna Judd's bandleader, who asked Stewart to sing demos for him. After recording the demos, Stewart signed to a recording contract with BNA Entertainment (now known as BNA Records), releasing her debut single "Somebody's in Love" in late 1992. This song was the first of three singles from her self-titled debut album — which was released in January 1993 — followed by "Under the Light of the Texaco" and "Drive Time". Also included on the album was a cover of Jeannie Seely's 1966 single "Don't Touch Me".

In addition to promoting her album on radio tours, Stewart hosted the nationally syndicated entertainment news show #1 Country. She also made appearances on The Nashville Network, hosting their programs Yesteryear and This Week in Country Music and was a featured performer on "Music City Tonight".

In 1994, she recorded her second album for BNA. Produced by Barry Beckett, the album was entitled Solitary Heart, and the first single was set to be "Let's Go to Vegas" (later a Top 5 hit for Faith Hill), but after a shakeup at the label, Stewart was dropped and the album was shelved.

From 1997-1999, she co-hosted This Week in Country Music with Steve Phillips on TNN. She also continued to tour throughout the late 1990s.

Stewart began acting in the 21st century under her married name of Lisa Stewart Seals, but is currently known as Lisa Stewart.

She is now making a mark in the jazz world and performs with her combo, often featuring Chester Thompson on drums (Genesis, Weather Report, Frank Zappa and The Mothers of Invention).

== Discography ==
=== Albums ===
Title	Album details
Lisa Stewart	Release date: January 1993; Label: BNA Records; Format: CD, cassette

=== Singles ===
Year	Single	Peak chart positions	
Year	Single	US Country	CAN Country
1992	"Somebody's in Love"	61	—
1993	"Under the Light of the Texaco"	—	—
1993	"Drive Time"	72	60
"—" denotes releases that did not chart

=== Music videos ===
Year	Video	Director
1993	"Somebody's in Love"	
1993	"Under the Light of the Texaco"	Steven Goldmann
1993	"Drive Time"	
