= Four Hearts =

Four Hearts may refer to:

- Four Hearts (1939 film), a 1939 Argentine film
- Four Hearts (1941 film), a 1941 Soviet film
- 4 Hearts, a 2009 Portuguese film
