= Two Hearts =

Two Hearts or 2 Hearts may refer to:

== Albums ==
- Two Hearts (Dave Mason album) or the title song, 1987
- Two Hearts (Jackie Evancho album), 2017
- Two Hearts (Men at Work album), 1985
- Two Hearts (Mary Hopkin album), 2023

== Songs ==
- "Two Hearts" (The Charms song), or "Two Hearts, Two Kisses (Make One Love)", 1954
- "Two Hearts" (Cliff Richard song), 1988
- "Two Hearts" (John Parr song), 1986
- "Two Hearts" (Kish Mauve song), 2005; covered as "2 Hearts" by Kylie Minogue, 2007
- "Two Hearts" (Phil Collins song), 1988
- "Two Hearts" (Stephanie Mills song), 1981
- "Two Hearts" (Tohoshinki song), 2008
- "2 Hearts", by Digitalism from I Love You Dude, 2011
- "2 Hearts", by Sam Feldt and Sigma, 2020
- "2 Hearts", by Sugababes from Taller in More Ways, 2005
- "2 Hearts", by Toto from Kingdom of Desire, 1992
- "Two Hearts", by Anika Moa from Love in Motion, 2010
- "Two Hearts", by Bruce Springsteen from The River, 1980
- "Two Hearts", by Chris Isaak from San Francisco Days, 1993
- "Two Hearts", by Mango Groove from Mango Groove, 1989
- "Two Hearts," by Post Malone from F-1 Trillion, 2024
- "Two Hearts", by Ryan Adams from Easy Tiger, 2007

== Other uses ==
- Two Hearts (film), a 1943 Italian film directed by Carlo Borghesio
- 2 Hearts (film), a 2020 American film directed by Lance Hool
- Two Hearts (story), a 2005 novelette by Peter S. Beagle

== See also ==
- Two of Hearts (disambiguation)
- Iruvar Ullam (disambiguation), title of various Indian films, literally Two Hearts
- Time Lords, a fictional extraterrestrial race with two hearts in the TV series Doctor Who
