= King of Hearts =

The king of hearts is a playing card in the standard 52-card deck.

King of Hearts may also refer to:

== Games ==
- The king of hearts has five sons, card game that may have been a precursor to Cluedo

== Books ==
- King of Hearts (Alice's Adventures in Wonderland), a character from Lewis Carroll's book Alice's Adventures in Wonderland
- King of Hearts, a biography by G. Wayne Miller

== Film and television ==
- King of Hearts (1936 film), UK, by Oswald Mitchell and Walter Tennyson
- King of Hearts (1947 film)
- King of Hearts (1966 film) or Le Roi de coeur, France, by Philippe de Broca
- King of Hearts (1968 film), Iran
- King of Hearts, member of the Shuffle Alliance in Mobile Fighter G Gundam
- Jamai Raja (TV series), India, named King of Hearts in English
- Dil Ka Raja (1972 film), India, lit. 'King of Hearts'
- Kalavani (2010 film), India, released as Dil Ka Raja in Hindi

== Music ==
- King of Hearts (French band), a French rock band

=== Albums ===
- King of Hearts (Engelbert Humperdinck album), 1973
- King of Hearts (Rick Vito album), 1992
- King of Hearts (Roy Orbison album), 1992
- King of Hearts (King Ernest Baker album), 1998
- King of Hearts (Camu Tao album), 2010
- King of Hearts (Lloyd album), 2011
- King of Hearts, the soundtrack for the 1966 film composed by Georges Delerue
- King of Hearts (Brandon Lake album), 2025

=== Songs ===
- "King of Hearts" (Cassie song), 2012, by Cassie
- King of Hearts (Brandon Lake song), 2025
- "King of Hearts", a song by Kim Petras from the 2023 album Feed the Beast

== Theater ==
- King of Hearts (musical), a 1978 Broadway musical with music by Peter Link
- King of Hearts (1954 play), a play by Jean Kerr and Eleanor Brooke
- King of Hearts (2007 play), a satire by Alistair Beaton

== See also ==
- or
- King of Clubs (disambiguation)
- King of Diamonds (disambiguation)
- King of Spades (disambiguation)
- Knave of Hearts (disambiguation)
- Jack of Hearts (disambiguation)
- Queen of Hearts (disambiguation)
- Ace of Hearts (disambiguation)
- Kingdom of Hearts, a video game series
