= Queen of Hearts =

The queen of hearts is a playing card in the standard 52-card deck.

Queen of Hearts or The Queen of Hearts may refer to:

== Books ==
- "The Queen of Hearts" (poem), anonymous nursery rhyme published 1782
- The Queen of Hearts, an 1859 novel by Wilkie Collins
- The Queen of Hearts (1881), a picture book by Randolph Caldecott
- Queen of Hearts (Alice's Adventures in Wonderland), a character from Alice's Adventures in Wonderland
  - Queen of Hearts (Disney), Disney's adaptation of the character

== Film and television ==
- Queen of Hearts (1936 film), a British musical starring Gracie Fields
- Queen of Hearts (1989 film), a comedy by Jon Amiel
- Queen of Hearts (2004 film), an Australian drama film written and directed by Danielle MacLean
- The Queen of Hearts (2009 film), a French film
- Queen of Hearts (2019 film), a Danish film
- Queen of Hearts (TV play), a 1985 BBC TV play
- Queen of Hearts (D:TNG episode), an episode of Degrassi: The Next Generation
- "Queen of Hearts" (Merlin), a 2010 episode of Merlin
- "Queen of Hearts" (Once Upon a Time), a 2012 episode of Once Upon a Time
  - Cora Mills, a character from the episode

== Music ==
- Queen of Hearts (musician), English electronic music artist

=== Albums ===
- The Queen of Hearts (album), by Offa Rex (Olivia Chaney and the Decemberists), 2017
- Queen of Hearts, a 2011 album by Jai Uttal

=== Songs ===
- "Queen of Hearts" (Joan Baez song), a 1965 traditional song
- "Queen of Hearts" (Hank DeVito song), a 1979 song written by Hank DeVito and performed by Dave Edmunds and later by Juice Newton
- "The Queen of Hearts" (song), a 1998 song by Agnetha Fältskog
- "Queen of Hearts", a 1973 song by Gregg Allman from Laid Back
- "Queen of Hearts", a 1990 song by Bad Boys Blue from Game of Love
- "Queen of Hearts", a 1978 song by David Coverdale from Northwinds
- "Queen of Hearts", a 2010 song by Jason Derülo from Jason Derulo
- "Queen of Hearts," a 2011 song by Fucked Up from David Comes to Life
- "Queen of Hearts," a 2022 song by Twice from Between 1&2
- "Queen of Hearts", a 2013 song by We the Kings from Somewhere Somehow

== Podcasts ==
- Queen of Hearts, a 2022 dating game show podcast hosted by Jujubee

== Buildings ==
- Queen of Hearts, Balchik or Dama Kupa, a historic hotel building in Balchik, Bulgaria
- Queen of Hearts, Manchester, a listed former public house in Manchester, Greater Manchester, England

== See also ==
- or
- Queen of Clubs (disambiguation)
- Queen of Diamonds (disambiguation)
- Queen of Spades (disambiguation)
- Knave of Hearts (disambiguation)
- Jack of Hearts (disambiguation)
- King of Hearts (disambiguation)
- Ace of Hearts (disambiguation)
- Barzan Abd al-Ghafur Sulayman Majid al-Tikrit, a Republican Guard commander under Saddam Hussein, the queen of hearts in the US deck of most-wanted Iraqi playing cards
- Diana, Princess of Wales (1961–1997), nicknamed Queen of people's Hearts
- The Looking Glass Wars, a series of novels by Frank Beddor featuring Queen Redd, an amalgamation of the Queen of Hearts and the Red Queen
- "Queen of the Broken Hearts", a 1983 song by Loverboy
- Red Queen (Through the Looking-Glass), a character in Lewis Carroll's Through the Looking-Glass
- Ispade Rajavum Idhaya Raniyum (English : King of Spades & Queen of Hearts), a 2019 Indian Tamil language romantic thriller film
- Sridevi: Queen of Hearts, a 2019 biography of Indian actress Sridevi by Lalita Iyer
