= Jack of Hearts =

The jack of hearts is a playing card in the standard 52-card deck.

Jack of Hearts may also refer to:

- Jack of Hearts (Marvel Comics) (Jack Hart), a fictional superhero appearing in Marvel Comics
- Jack of Hearts, a member of the Royal Flush Gang in DC Comics
- Jack of Hearts (TV series), a 1999 six-part British television crime drama series
- Jack of Hearts (play), an Australian comedy play by David Williamson
- Jack of Hearts (1950 film), a 1950 Swedish film directed by Hasse Ekman
- Jack of Hearts (1986 film), a 1986 Canadian short film based on a story by Isabel Huggan
- Jack of Hearts (1999 film), a 1999 American film directed by Serge Rodnunsky and starring Nick Mancuso
- The Jack of Hearts, a 1919 American short Western film directed by B. Reeves Eason

== See also ==
- Jack of the Red Hearts, a 2015 film
- "Lily, Rosemary and the Jack of Hearts", a song by Bob Dylan released on the 1975 album Blood on the Tracks
- or
- Knave of Hearts (disambiguation)
- Jack of Clubs (disambiguation)
- Jack of Diamonds (disambiguation)
- Jack of Spades (disambiguation)
- Queen of Hearts (disambiguation)
- King of Hearts (disambiguation)
- Ace of Hearts (disambiguation)
- Jack Hart (disambiguation)
