= Ace of Hearts =

The ace of hearts is a playing card in the standard 52-card deck.

Ace of Hearts may also refer to:

- The Ace of Hearts (1921 film), a silent film starring Lon Chaney, Sr.
- Ace of Hearts (2008 film), directed by David Mackay
- Ace of Hearts Records, a budget record label owned by Decca records
- Ace of Hearts Records (Boston), a Boston-based record label started in 1978
- "Ace of Hearts" (Chris Rea song), 1984
- Ace of Hz, a song and EP by Ladytron
- Ace of Hearts, a band created by Jacob Rabon IV

== See also ==
- or
- Ace of Clubs (disambiguation)
- Ace of Diamonds (disambiguation)
- Ace of Spades (disambiguation)
- Jack of Hearts (disambiguation)
- Queen of Hearts (disambiguation)
- King of Hearts (disambiguation)
