= Forty-fives =

Trick-taking card game

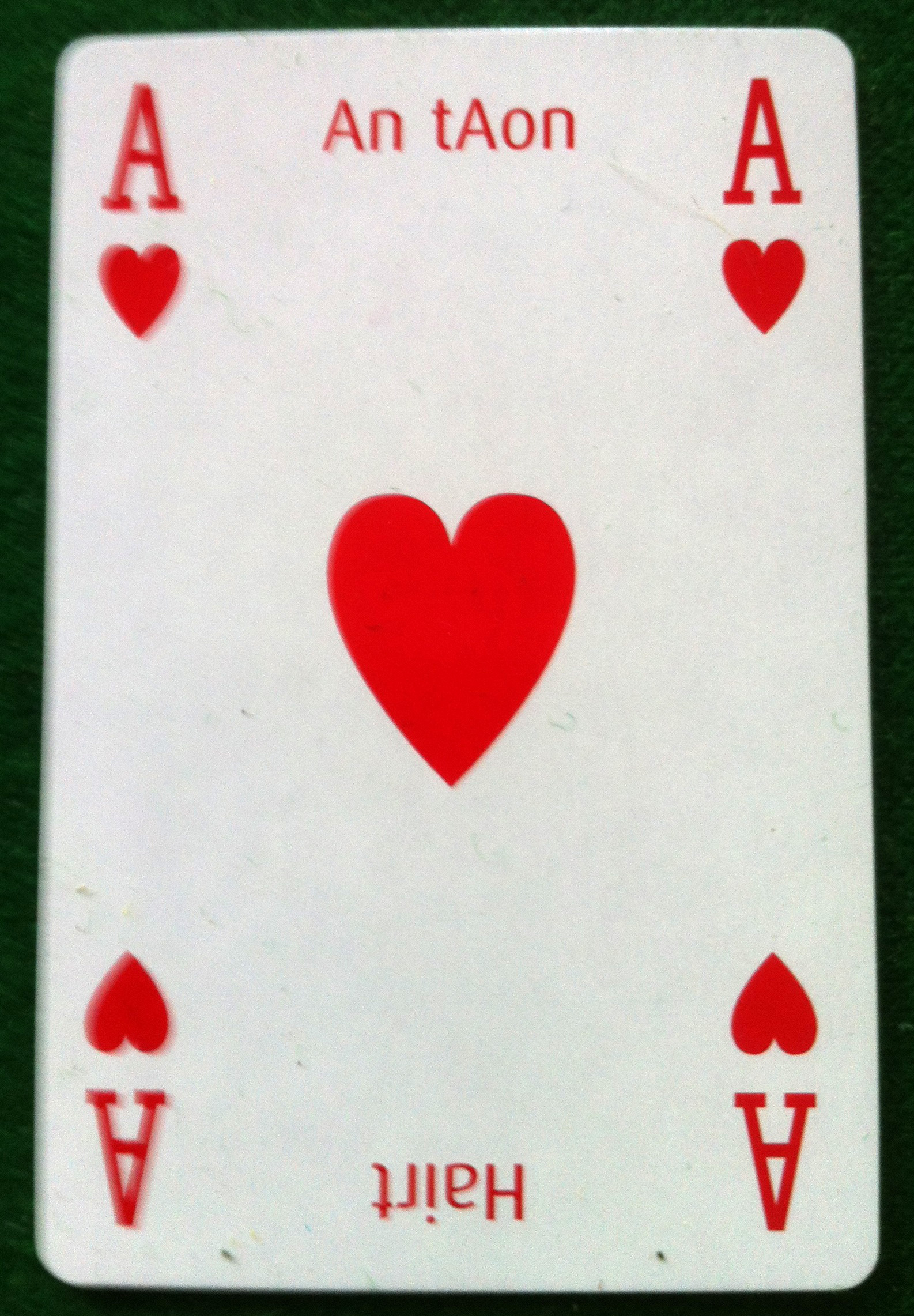
- Ace of Hearts (Irish language deck), always a trump in forty-fives
- Origin: Ireland
- Alternative names: Forty-five, forte fives, auction forty-fives, 45 à bitter, auction 120s, 120, growl, spoil five, maw, strong fives
- Type: trick-taking
- Family: Trick-taking
- Players: 2–6
- Skills: Strategy
- Age range: 7+
- Cards: 52
- Deck: French
- Rank (high→low): See below
- Play: Clockwise
- Playing time: 20 min.
- Chance: Medium

Related games
- Spoil Five, Maw

Forty-fives (also known as auction forty-fives, auction 120s, 120, and growl) is a trick-taking card game that originated in Ireland. The game is popular in many communities throughout Atlantic Canada (New Brunswick, Newfoundland and Labrador, Nova Scotia, Prince Edward Island) as well as the Gaspé Coast in Québec. Forty-fives is also played in parts of Massachusetts (Note: For example, in the Merrimack Valley.) and southern New Hampshire in New England, United States, as well as in the South Island of New Zealand. Some other very small populations of players also seem to reside in Seattle, Washington and Los Angeles, California by way of traveling from the east and spreading the game.

There are several regional variations. Traditional Forty Fives goes to a score of 45 points, hence the name of the game. In the Auction Forty Fives variant the score goes to 120 points and requires bidding. In many areas outside of Canada, Auction Forty Fives is simply referred to as Forty Fives. Although the number 45 has no relevance to Auction Forty Fives, the name persisted. Auction Forty Fives is closely related to the game One-hundred and ten.

== History ==
=== Early history ===
Forty-fives is a descendant of the Irish game, Twenty-five, a variant of Spoilt Five, which in turn is a descendant of a game that King James VI of Scotland popularized in the 17th century called Maw. Scottish emigrants to Atlantic Canada may explain the reason for the popularity of the game there. Maw dates to at least 1548 and is regularly reported up to around 1650 and the earliest written rules of 1576, the incomplete "Groom Porter's lawes at Mawe," may have originated from Scotland. James VI was recorded playing "Maye" at Kinneil House at Christmas 1588. The daughters of Elizabeth Kitson, Meg and Mary played Maw at Hengrave Hall at Christmas 1572.

=== 19th century ===
By 1831, the game had reached America because Eliza Leslie records a simple version that year of what she calls Five and Forty in a book for American girls. A full pack is used. Any number may play and the first dealer is chosen by cutting; highest deals (Aces high). The cards are shuffled and cut before the dealer deals 5 cards each before turning the next for trump. Eldest hand leads to the first trick and players may always play any card. The trick is won by the highest trump or the highest card of the led suit if no trumps are played. The trick winner places the trick beside her and leads to the next trick. Each trick taken scores 5 points and 45 is game.

=== Recent history ===
In the 1920s, French Canadian economic migrants who moved south into Massachusetts and New Hampshire in New England introduced the game, where it continues to be popular, sometimes under the French name quarante-cinq. In this region the game is most popular in the Merrimack Valley region of southern New Hampshire and northeastern Massachusetts. Forty fives tournaments are becoming increasingly popular there. For example, the New England Academy of Forty-Fives holds occasional tournaments in Plaistow, New Hampshire, and Methuen, located in the Merrimack Valley, recently held a Forty-Fives tournament. At the community level a popular pastime on Dog Beach in Newbury, Massachusetts, is to play auction Forty-Fives at low tide during green head season. A growing concern however is the decreasing amount of knowledgeable players in the area as many current enjoyers of the game are older. It is encouraged to teach others to play in order to spread the game and keep the spirit alive.

In New Brunswick Forty-Fives was a popular evening pastime at lumber camps during the late 19th and early 20th centuries, as well as with men congregating at general stores. The Auction Forty-Fives variant is popular through the province at community "card parties". For example, in the greater Harvey Station, New Brunswick area (GHA) biweekly card parties are popular with cottagers and local residents alike during the Spring-Fall months at the Lodges of the Ladies' Orange Benevolent Association (L.O.B.A) Tweedside. In the GHA there are also weekly gatherings at the 50+ Hall, Prince William.

On Cape Breton Island, Nova Scotia, notably in Richmond County, there are 45-Card-Games in almost all communities. This may involve tens or hundreds of people depending on the size of the jackpot. Generally 25 games are played in an evening, couples only, usually lasting about two hours. Winning teams rotate around the room, while the losers remain stationary. Winners always deal first. Each couple has a small cue card with the numbers 1 through 25, wins are punched out with a hole punch. Usually there are three winners for the evening, the teams with the highest number of games. Ties may be broken by splitting the prize, cutting the deck for low card win, or playing off. If one party wants to play-off, others either do so or forfeit; splitting must be unanimous. Thus, if two couples have 18 games, a third couple 16 games and a fourth and fifth couple 15 games, then the third couple is automatically the second-place winner. First and third place prizes are either split, or the deck is cut, or there is a play-off. Sometimes there is a cookie jar, where a couple can attempt to win eight or ten randomly chosen games. Sometimes there is a consolation-like boobie prize for the team with the fewest games.

Forty-fives is popularly played on the West Coast of the South Island of New Zealand. Regular 45's Tournaments are held as a fun night out in locations like Workingman's clubs and RSA buildings. Serious competition tournaments are held yearly. There was a large percentage of Irish immigrants on the West Coast, normally around a third of immigrants to this region of New Zealand in colonial times, and the game of 45s originated from among these immigrants.

Forty-five is still played in many places in Ireland, with tournaments called 45 Card Drives being played.

== Card ranks ==
The ranking of cards depends on which suit is the trump suit. The trump suit follows a trump suit ranking, beginning with the 5, J, and A♥. The A♥ is always considered part of the trump suit, even if the trump suit is not hearts. Cards from the non-trump suits, known as "off-suits", follow off-suit rankings beginning with the K, Q and J.

Any card from the trump suit beats any cards from an off-suit. In the absence of a trump card, the best card from the off-suit that was led wins the trick.

There are unique rankings to remember for number cards and for off-suit Aces. In red suits, 10 is best and 2 is worst; but in black suits, 2 is best and 10 is worst. A simple way to remember this is "red is high, black is low." Another is "Black is Black-wards; Red is Red-gular." The ranking of off-suit Aces also depends on the suit. In black off-suits, the A is stronger than number cards but weaker than face cards, while in diamonds the A is the weakest card.

Trump diamonds	5♦	J♦	A♥	A♦	K♦	Q♦		10♦	9♦	8♦	7♦	6♦		4♦	3♦	2♦
Trump hearts	5♥	J♥	A♥		K♥	Q♥		10♥	9♥	8♥	7♥	6♥		4♥	3♥	2♥
Off-suit diamonds					K♦	Q♦	J♦	10♦	9♦	8♦	7♦	6♦	5♦	4♦	3♦	2♦	A♦
Off-suit hearts					K♥	Q♥	J♥	10♥	9♥	8♥	7♥	6♥	5♥	4♥	3♥	2♥
Trump clubs	5♣	J♣	A♥	A♣	K♣	Q♣			2♣	3♣	4♣		6♣	7♣	8♣	9♣	10♣
Trump spades	5♠	J♠	A♥	A♠	K♠	Q♠			2♠	3♠	4♠		6♠	7♠	8♠	9♠	10♠
Off-suit clubs					K♣	Q♣	J♣	A♣	2♣	3♣	4♣	5♣	6♣	7♣	8♣	9♣	10♣
Off-suit spades					K♠	Q♠	J♠	A♠	2♠	3♠	4♠	5♠	6♠	7♠	8♠	9♠	10♠

== Rules ==
=== Traditional forty-fives (45 point) ===
The game is played with a regular deck of 52 cards. One joker is used also. Players are dealt 5 cards each. Each player is dealt three cards at once, starting with eldest hand, the player left of the dealer, and continuing in a clockwise-direction, then each player is dealt two cards at once in the same order. The dealer never deals more than three cards at a time.

The top card of the deck is turned face up. The card that is shown determines the trump suit and that card is left on top of the deck. If an ace is turned up, that is the trump suit but the dealer must immediately claim the ace by discarding one of his dealt cards. If any of the players is dealt the ace of the trump suit, then he may claim the card that was turned up by discarding one of his other cards. This must be done before he plays his first card.

Each stage, where every player plays a card, is called a trick. As there are 5 cards in a hand, there will be 5 tricks played and won. One card is played by each player, in turn, starting with the player to the left of the dealer. The winner of the trick is determined by who played the highest card. The winner gets five points (on his way to 45). A bonus trick worth ten points rather than five points is awarded for the best card played during the round. This is determined at the end of the round.

Rule for which card may be played:

- Players must always follow the suit of the led card.
- The led card can only be beaten by a higher card in the same suit or with a trump.
- Any trump suit card beats every non-trump suit card.
- The only time in which a player may choose not to follow trump suit is when the only trump card he has is the five, jack, joker or ace of hearts or if he does not have any cards of the trump suit. A player might wish to save the most powerful cards if he believes that another player is saving another strong card, or until he believes the other trump cards have been exhausted so that he can have the advantage of leading the remaining tricks. The action of holding a card in this fashion is known as reneging.
- If the ace of hearts is led, players must always play a trump card to follow suit. If they have no trump (and trump is not hearts) they must play a heart if there is one in hand. If they have no trump or heart they may play any other card.

Once a player has revealed his card to players, that card is deemed to be played.

Points are added up based on tricks won and the bonus trick at the end of the round. Scores after the first round are full 30, 25–5, 20–10 or two 15s (note that the total must be 30). Scores after the second round are win, 40–20, 35–25 or two 30s (totalling 60). The score of the game is not written down, simply remembered by the players. If many games are played one should keep track of the number of games won. If it happens that all players have no trump, hence no best trump then the score after a round will only add up to 25.

If a player reached 45 points or more (including points earned in previous rounds), that player wins. If more than one player reaches at least 45 points in the same round, the player with more points is the winner. If no player reaches 45 points, the deal is given to the player to the left of the last dealer and a new round begins.

If playing in a fire house and you get a call mid game and do not flow water the game continues.

=== 120 point ===
In the 120-point version, the game goes to 120 points.

=== Auction Forty-Fives ===
There are four styles of play for auction forty-fives:

- Heads up: two players, one on one.
- Three-way cut-throat: In this game after a player wins the bid and calls the Trump, the other two players form a temporary unspoken truce to try to 'shoot' the bidder. Players who do not honor this truce are seen as selfish and called nickel grabbers (each trick is worth 5 points).
- Five-way cut-throat: Similar to normal 3-man cut throat. In this game it is much harder to make your bid as it tends to be 4 vs. 1 and the bidder is often shot.
- Partners/teams: Either four or six players (two teams of 2, or two teams of 3), with teammates sitting in every other position. Points are pooled towards the overall team score, and towards bid.

Cards are dealt the same as in forty-fives except that three cards are dealt to the kitty after each player has their first three cards. Games are often played 'no kitty' and are considered to be more legitimate.

Instead of the top card being turned over after the deal and determining trump, players bid based on the strength of their hand. Bidding is done before a trump suit is declared. Players bid 15, 20, 25, or 30 points based on how many points they think they can earn with their hand if they get to call the trump suit. (In some versions, if a player bids 30 a following bidder can go “30 for 60." If they win all five tricks, they earn 30 points. If they are set, they lose 60.) Bidding goes in the same order as the deal. If no one bids, choosing instead to pass, then the dealer automatically bids 15 and play resumes as normal. When this happens the dealer is said to have been "bagged".

The player who wins the bid announces the trump suit and they must have at least one card of that suit in their hand. After trump is called (it is important for trump to be called prior to this step), the person who called trump adds the kitty to their hand. Players then discard any unwanted cards (usually non-trump suited cards except for the ace of hearts). If it is a six player game, then each player must keep a minimum of two cards to ensure cards do not run out. In a five player game they must keep at least one card. The winning bidder may not keep more than five cards.

In the same order as the original deal, the dealer replenishes each player's hand so that all players have five cards. In some versions, if a player chooses to discard all five of their cards, the dealer will replenish their hand with "four and a flip" placing the fifth card face-up for all players to see.

The winning bidder plays first. The first card thrown is said to have been "led". If the card led is in the trump suit, then each player must play a card of the trump suit if possible. If a player breaks this rule they are said to have "reneged". The ace of hearts is always considered part of the trump suit. There is one legal circumstance where a trump card does not have to follow suit. If you have one of the three major cards, i.e. the 5 of trump, the jack of trump or the ace of hearts, you may "renege" the card(s) and not play a trump card. This only works with the three top cards, any other cards in hand must follow suit. Reneging is very powerful in playing partners or trying to take the last two tricks of a hand. The winning bidder does not have to lead play with trump suit nor do players have to lead with trump suit when they lead a trick but players must play trump suit if a trump suit card is played in the trick and they have a trump suit card remaining in their hand. One version of the game also states that if you do not trump into an off-trump hand, you are supposed to follow the suit of the card being led. In this version, if the ace of hearts is led and a following player has no trump cards, they must then play a heart should they have one.

When points are counted at the end of the round, the winning bidder adds their point total only if it equals or beats their bid. If they do not "meet their bid" they instead subtract their bid amount. This is known as being "set", "shot", or "setting the bidder" The object for the players that did not win the bid, therefore, is to make as many points as possible while at the same time preventing the bidder from making their bid.

The trick with the highest ranked card of the hand is the bonus trick, and is worth 5 extra points, or 10 points total. One trick of 10 and the remaining 4 tricks of 5 points make up the 30 points possible with each hand.

Points are added from round to round until a player or team reaches 120 and wins. Winning the game is referred to as "going out", and a player who is within 30 points of 120 is said to be "on the green" or "on deck". (This means they are theoretically one hand away from winning the game.) If multiple players go out on the same hand, then the player who bid that hand wins. This is referred to as "bidder goes out”. In three-way cut-throat, if the two non-bidders go out on the same hand and the bidder does not, the player with the most points after the hand is finished, wins. If these two players are tied after this hand, the game (and dealing order) continues as normal. The next player to have more points than both other players, wins.

In some versions, once any player or team reaches 100 points or more, they must win the bid to receive points. They are locked in at that score unless they are the bidder, and they win they will either win the game or their score will go down depending on if they make the bid or not. This encourages the remaining players to bid against a player who is approaching 120, so that he will rarely be able to win the bid cheaply.

=== One-hundred and ten ===
One-hundred and ten (110) is similar to the Merrimack Valley variant of forty-fives. In it, an extra hand is dealt, face down, by the dealer into the centre of the table. No trump card is turned. Once all hands have been dealt the "bidding" begins with the player to the dealer's left, and proceeds in turn around the table. Each player must bid a minimum of fifteen points and five more points than the previous highest bidder, or pass. An exception to this rule is the dealer, who can appropriate (match) the highest bid and force the other players to either raise his bid or pass. Bidding continues to circulate around the table until all players have "passed" (i.e. the same player can bid, be raised, and raise again in turn).

When bidding has concluded the highest bidder declares which suit will be trumps. He then takes the hand dealt face down in the centre of the table and chooses his best five cards from the combination of the two hands. Meanwhile, the remaining players are entitled to draw up to three cards from the deck, first discarding from their own hand. When all players have obtained their hand the winning bidder has the option of playing first or requiring the player to his left to play first. If a player has the ace of trumps the player may turn over the cards remaining in the deck stub, one at a time, until a trump card is turned, then he may discard his weakest card in favour of the trump card, or choose not to.

A bonus of five points (bonus trick) is awarded to the player who plays the highest card during the course of the round, thus the maximum amount that can be bid or obtained in 30. If the bidder obtains or exceeds his bid his score increases by that amount, if he fails to reach his bid his score is reduced by the amount of the bid. All other players often co-operate (without collusion) to prevent the bidder from reaching his bid, though selfish interests can supersede this.

A player cannot progress beyond 105 unless he is the bidder. If a player wins tricks during another players bid, which would otherwise increase his score beyond 105, those scores do not count, nor are they assigned to any of the other players. This encourages the remaining players to bid against a player who is approaching one hundred and ten, so that he will rarely be able to win the bid cheaply. Scores can reduce below zero, it is common to set a cut off point (often minus 80) at which a player is removed from the game.

The first player to reach 110 wins the game.

Several variations of 110 exist. These include the removal of the ace of trumps rule, the use of jokers (usually valued just below the jack (knave) of trumps), the bell rule (where a successful call of 30 yields 60 points) and various reneging variations.

=== Variations ===
- If you prevent the winning bidder from winning enough tricks to score by only using non-trump cards you get 30 points.
- Dealer cannot hold until the bid is at least 20.
- Non-trump aces are the highest ranking non-trump cards regardless of the colour of the suit (common rule in New Brunswick/Nova Scotia).
- Before the deal, the player to the right of the dealer must cut the deck. For the next round the deal passes to the dealer's left, so the dealer of one round always cuts in the next round, should there be one.
- In the Merrimack Valley variant of Auction Forty-Fives, the winning bidder plays first.
- One may deal two cards to all players and then three cards to all players if desired. This is the dealer's choice. Two cards first is sometimes called the "Newfoundland Deal," the "Rocky Bay Deal," or the "Dog Beach Deal."
- The bidder may discard their hand and "go on the kitty". This means they can choose the trump only from the cards in the kitty. A variation on this is to even reject going on the kitty and instead "go on the top card". This means that a player discards the kitty and is dealt a single card which they must declare as trump.
- Players may discard all five cards, but when being replenished, the fifth card is dealt face-up. This is known as "four and a flip".
- In most games, it is considered appropriate to ask if a player is "booked." To be "booked" is to have only cards of the trump suit. In this case, the asking player may then choose to fold or stay in the game.
- If a player or team wins when the opponents start the round with 40 points, it is called hanging a 40.
- Someone leading the Ace of Hearts might say "Hearts on Hearts" so that no one reneges.
- No reneging allowed or only the 5 of trump may be reneged.
- Any player whose score hits exactly "45" is set back to Zero—The dreaded Forty-Five Rule.
- Only the 5 is worth 10 points. If the 5 is not dealt and played, then the hand only has a total of 25 points.
- Scores below zero are called "in the hole" or "in the box". A player cannot be removed from the game for having a score that is too low (i.e., there is hope for everyone...even the player at -80); the reason for this is due to the bonus points described below.
- A player can outbid a 30-point bid by bidding '30 for 60'. This means that if the player does not make 30 points, they lose 60 points. Depending on the rules, they could stand to win 60 points if they make their 30-point bid. Some variations also allow a '60 for 120' bid. Even if this rule is respected, it is still very uncommon.
- 30-for-60: Without looking at one's cards one must call 30-for-60. It is the same as bidding 30 regularly but a player bidding 30-for-60 would get 60 points should they win all the tricks and drop 60 points should they lose any tricks.
- A 30 bid is always called 30 for 60, which means that if the player or team gets all 30 points in the hand they get a bonus of an extra 30 points. If they do not win the bid they only go down 30 points. Thus a team at 65 points that bids 30 for 60 will either win the game or go down to 35 points.
- Slam: Basically the same as 30-for-60, but the player would get 120 points for winning all tricks and lose 60 if they fail to win all the tricks. A player may Slam at any time after looking at their five cards.
- "5 players, call for your partner": Before looking at the kitty, the winning bidder calls for a card. The player who has the called card is the winning bidder's partner for that hand. The player with the called card does not announce that they have it. The called card must be played on the second trick. If no one has the called card, then it's 4 against 1.
- A common variation found in Nova Scotia does not use the joker, and uses the same card values as the traditional Irish game Twenty-five.

== Cultural depictions ==
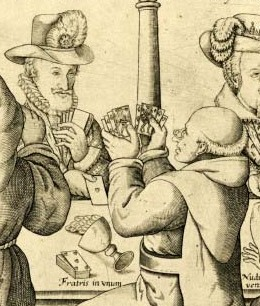
Detail of the game of maw in Cockson's The Revells of Christendome

Thomas Cockson's 1609 engraving The Revells of Christendome includes a description of the game maw being played:

Hopes to winn something too, Maw is the game
at which hee playes, & Challengeth at the same
A Monk, who stakes a Challice : France setts gould,
& shuffles: the Monk cutts: but France (being bould)
Deales freely: Rubs : and the first card hee showes,
is the Five Finger, which being tourn’d up, goes
Cold to the Moncks hart : the next card, France sees
in his owne hand, is the Ace of hartes, "I Leeze"
Cryes out the Monck; sayes France, "Show what you have,"
the Monck could show France nothing but the Knave.

In Herminie Templeton Kavanagh's tale Darby O'Gill and the Good People, the hero Darby plays forty-fives with the King of the Fairies, Brian Connors.

Forty-fives appears in Thomas Head Raddall's 1950 novel The Nymph and the Lamp, where it is described as "practically the national game of Nova Scotia."

Alice Taylor mentions the game in her memoir Do You Remember?, and Alden Nowlan makes reference to the game in his story The Glass Roses. In an episode of Bob and Margaret, a passing motorcyclist strikes up a game while characters are stuck in traffic.

The narrator Noe plays a game of Forty-Five with his grandparents Ganga and Doady, and with Christy, in This Is Happiness, the 2019 novel by Irish writer Niall Williams.

== Bibliography ==
- Leslie, Eliza (1831). The American Girl's Book. Boston: Munroe & Francis; NY: C.S. Francis.
