= Jack of Clubs =

Jack of Clubs may refer to:

- Jack of clubs (playing card)
- Jack of Clubs (album), an album by Paul Motian
- Jack of Clubs Creek, a creek in British Columbia, Canada
- Jack O'Clubs, a 1924 American silent crime film directed by Robert F. Hill

== See also ==
- or
- Ace of Clubs (disambiguation)
- Jack of Diamonds (disambiguation)
- Jack of Hearts (disambiguation)
- Jack of Spades (disambiguation)
- Queen of Clubs (disambiguation)
- King of Clubs (disambiguation)
- Knave (disambiguation)
- Knave of Clubs, a former pub in London
