= Twenty-five (card game) =

Irish card game

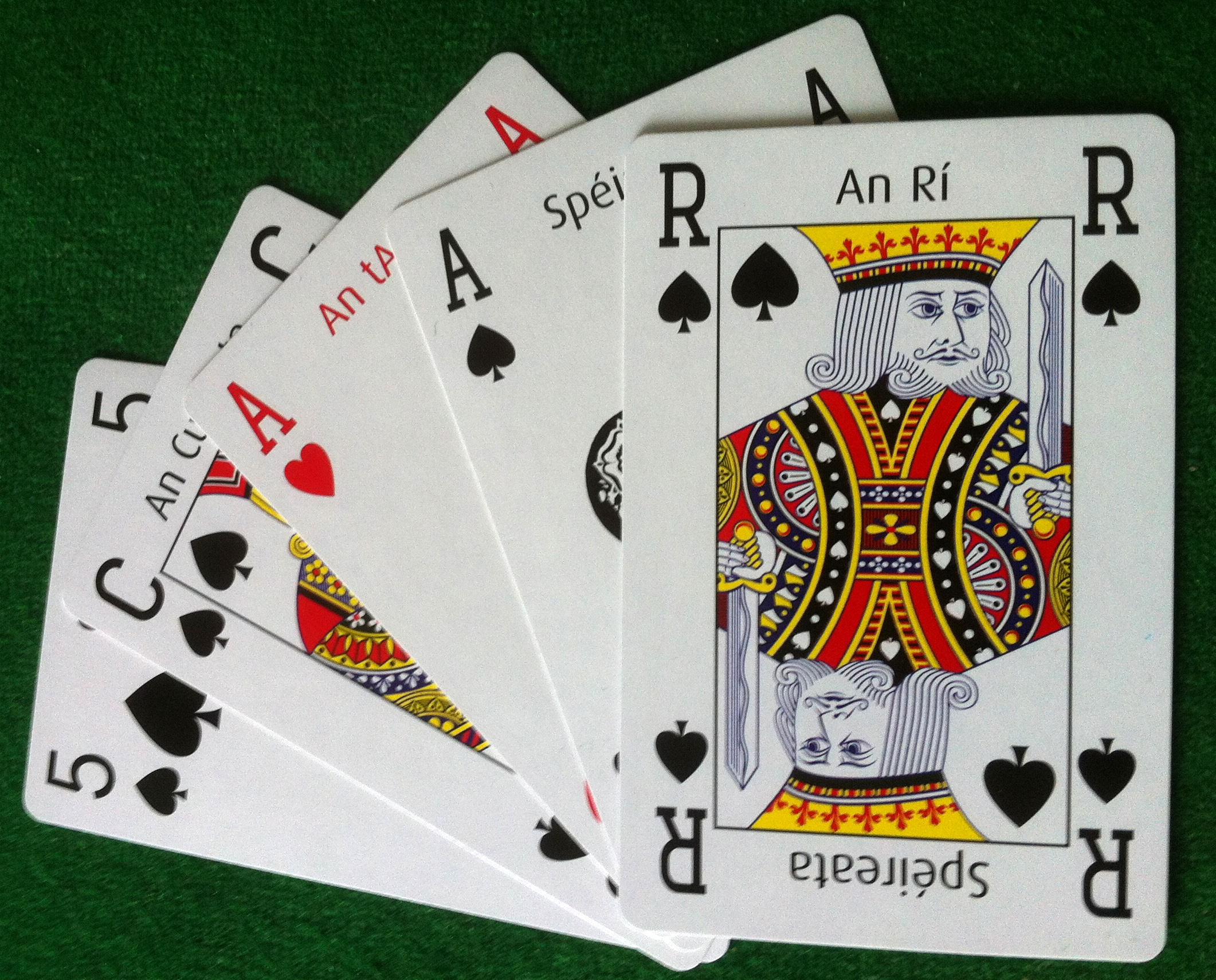
- A hand of five cards from an Irish deck
- Origin: Ireland
- Type: Trick-taking
- Players: 3–8
- Skills: Tactics & Strategy
- Cards: 52
- Deck: French
- Play: Clockwise
- Playing time: 25 min.
- Chance: Medium

Related games
- Forty-five

Twenty-five is the Irish national card game, which also underlies the Canadian game of Forty-fives. Charles Cotton describes its ancestor in 1674 as "Five Cards", and gives the nickname five fingers to the Five of Trumps extracted from the fact that the Irish word cúig means both 'five' and 'trick'. It is supposed to be of great antiquity, and widely believed to have originated in Ireland, although "its venerable ancestor", Maw, of which James I of England was very fond, is a Scottish game.

== Family ==
The game is a 19th century member of the Maw family of games that also includes the round game of Spoil Five (also called Spoil-Five, or Spoilt Five), the older games of Five Cards and Five and Ten and the extension of Twenty-Five called Forty-Five.

== History ==
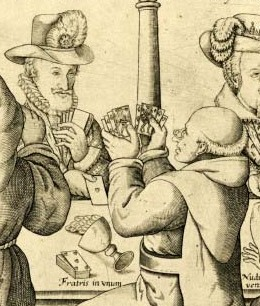
The game of Maw depicted in Thomas Cockson's 1609 engraving The Revells of Christendome

Twenty-five is descended from the old Scottish game of Maw, which dates to at least 1548 and is mentioned frequently up to about 1650. Maw was fashionable during the reign of James I and became the chief game of the English court. However, it died out during the time of the English Commonwealth (1649–1660) only to appear in Charles Cotton's The Compleat Gamester of 1674 as Five Cards, in which the trump 5, known as five fingers is the highest card, followed by the ace of hearts, trump ace and trump knave, an earlier order different from later members of the family.

Thereafter the game disappears again from the literature until the early 19th century where it resurfaces under the names of various descendants including Five and Ten, Spoil Five and Forty-five.

Twenty-five itself, also called five-and-twenty, emerged alongside these other variants and is mentioned as early as 1833 in the Dublin Penny Journal in an article against gambling: "...rustic gambling is conducted on the plan of a lottery. The woman of the house has generally one or more of such articles [a turkey, goose, herrings or mutton] as those above mentioned, which are purchased by the party to play at a price far above their intrinsic value; each purchase is paid for in equal shares, and the winner of one or more games, at five and twenty, or first fifteen... carries off the prize..." It is probably much older for, in 1858, an Irish periodical describes Twenty-Five and Forty-Five as "our own old games" in which the five of trumps, called five fingers, was the best card, followed by the Ace of Hearts.

However, the first detailed rules do not appear until 1876, when H.E. Heather describes it as a variant of Forty-Five. Any number could play and the cards ranked as described below with the five fingers (trump 5) as the commanding card and, unlike modern rules, the only one that could renege in the sense of being withheld when trumps were led, even if its holder had no other trump. Players cut for first deal (highest or lowest winning it as agreed); the cards were shuffled and cut before being dealt in threes and twos so that each player had five. The next was turned for trump. A player with the trump ace could rob the trump upcard. Whist rules of play were followed i.e. players had to follow suit if able (with the exception of the privilege associated with the five fingers); only if void in the led suit could they trump – this is unlike modern rules in which, as in all fours, players may trump even if they can follow. Each trick was worth five and twenty-five was game. Unlike Heather's rules for Forty-five, there was no jinking (winning the game on taking all five tricks) and no score of 5 for best trump.

Twenty-five eventually emerged to become the national card game of Ireland.

== Overview ==
Twenty-five may be played by 2–9 persons, six being the best number. A standard pack is used and each player receives five cards. The dealer shuffles the deck, and then offers the player to his right the option of cutting the deck, before the dealing begins.

Dealing is not done sequentially with one card per player, as in poker for example. Instead, players receive two cards per each, and then three cards each to make up their total of five cards each. The dealer may reverse that order (three then two). When all players have received 5 cards, the deck is positioned centrally and one last card is turned up to fix the trump suit.

The object of the play is to win tricks. Each trick one being worth 5 points. When a player reaches 25 points (5 tricks) they win the game. Winning the game may require multiple hands (rounds) of dealing. The position of the dealer shifts one person to the left for each new hand.

== Preliminaries ==
A full pack of 52 cards is used and each player receives five cards, dealt in pairs and triplets, being the next card on the top of the pack turned up for trump.

The turn to deal and play always passes to the left, and after the first hand, each player deals in rotation. Where the game is strictly played, the person who misdeals, or who departs from the order with which the game began, of dealing either the three or the two cards first, forfeits his deal. After all players have received their 5 cards, the deck is placed centrally face down, turning the topmost card for trump.

=== Robbing ===
If the turn-up is an ace, the dealer may "rob the trump" by putting out, face downwards, any card from his hand and take in the ace, but the trump suit remains unaltered. Similarly, a player who holds the ace of trumps may himself rob the trump at any time before playing to the first trick, putting out any card and taking in the turn-up, but need not disclose the fact until it is his turn to play. If the holder of the trump ace does not wish to rob, and does not announce the fact that he holds it before playing to the first trick, then, whenever he does play it, it counts as the lowest trump (note: this is not a rule in the Irish midlands). A player who fails to rob cannot go out that hand (note: this is not a rule in the Irish midlands; failing to rob is merely your personal loss of the trump on the deck). The card put out may not be seen. Most hosts of hames make "robbing" optional but it’s always best to check and align with any local rules.

=== Ranking of cards ===
| Trump diamonds | 5♦ | J♦ | A♥ | A♦ | K♦ | Q♦ | | 10♦ | 9♦ | 8♦ | 7♦ | 6♦ | | 4♦ | 3♦ | 2♦ |
| Trump hearts | 5♥ | J♥ | A♥ | | K♥ | Q♥ | | 10♥ | 9♥ | 8♥ | 7♥ | 6♥ | | 4♥ | 3♥ | 2♥ |
| Off-suit diamonds | | | | | K♦ | Q♦ | J♦ | 10♦ | 9♦ | 8♦ | 7♦ | 6♦ | 5♦ | 4♦ | 3♦ | 2♦ | A♦ |
| Off-suit hearts | | | | | K♥ | Q♥ | J♥ | 10♥ | 9♥ | 8♥ | 7♥ | 6♥ | 5♥ | 4♥ | 3♥ | 2♥ |
| Trump clubs | 5♣ | J♣ | A♥ | A♣ | K♣ | Q♣ | | | 2♣ | 3♣ | 4♣ | | 6♣ | 7♣ | 8♣ | 9♣ | 10♣ |
| Trump spades | 5♠ | J♠ | A♥ | A♠ | K♠ | Q♠ | | | 2♠ | 3♠ | 4♠ | | 6♠ | 7♠ | 8♠ | 9♠ | 10♠ |
| Off-suit clubs | | | | | K♣ | Q♣ | J♣ | A♣ | 2♣ | 3♣ | 4♣ | 5♣ | 6♣ | 7♣ | 8♣ | 9♣ | 10♣ |
| Off-suit spades | | | | | K♠ | Q♠ | J♠ | A♠ | 2♠ | 3♠ | 4♠ | 5♠ | 6♠ | 7♠ | 8♠ | 9♠ | 10♠ |

So it will be seen that when diamonds are not trump (also known as off-suit), the A♦ is the worst card in the pack; when diamonds are trump it is the fourth best card in the game. When hearts are trumps, there is no second ace in the trump ranking, and whether trumps or not, the 2♣ or 2♠ is better than all plain cards in their respective suit.

== The play ==
The player on the dealer's left leads first. Players must follow suit whenever possible, and the highest card of the suit led or, if a trump is played, the highest trump wins the trick. Each player must follow suit when trump is led, under the penalty of forfeiting his stake, except in the case of the three best trump cards, the 5 and J of trumps and the A♥, each of which is privileged to renege. Each trick one is worth 5 points to the winner. The object of the game is to reach 25 points first, that being 5 tricks won.

=== Reneging ===
When trumps are led, the 5 and J of trumps, and the A♥, need not be played. This is called reneging (colloquially, "rejigging"). The 5 may always renege: if it is led, no card can renege. The J may renege if the 5 is played, not led. Only the 5 can renege to the J led. The A♥ can renege to any inferior card. If hearts are not trumps and the A♥ is led, a trump must be played if possible; if not, it is not necessary to play a heart.

== Strategy ==
If the elder hand has a certain five, that is to say, if he holds three cards which will each take a trick, he ought to play them, as there is a great probability, if his two remaining cards are strong non trumps, that he may get the whole five, and thus win a double stake (note: there is no double stake in the Irish midlands). But if he holds only indifferent cards, the best method is to throw the lead into his opponent's hand by playing an inferior card, in the hope of regaining it at the third trick, which is the critical stage of the game; and as three tricks constitute a five equally as four, it is reckoned better play to reserve the best cards till the third trick, than to risk the game by eagerness to secure the first two.

== Variants ==
Twenty-five and Forty-five are varieties of Spoil-five and they are played for either of these numbers. The main feature between these two varieties and the game of Spoil Five is that there is no Spoil. Each trick counts five to the maker and the trick made by the highest trump out scores ten. If a player gets out before that trump is played, he wins the game all the same. The winning of all five tricks is called a jink and the player who jinks wins the game whether played for twenty-five or forty-five points.

== See also ==
- Ombre, related Spanish card game
- The Revells of Christendome

== Literature ==
- Brownsmith, Telemachus [pseud.] (1869). "Spoil Five" in The Westminster Chess Club Papers. Vols. 1–3. London: W. Kent; Edinburgh: J. Menzies; Dublin: McGlashan. pp. 108–110.
- Brownsmith, Telemachus [pseud.] (1869). "Five and Ten" in The Westminster Chess Club Papers. Vols. 1–3. London: W. Kent; Edinburgh: J. Menzies; Dublin: McGlashan. p. 109.
- "Trumps" [William Brisbane Dick] (1864). The American Hoyle. NY: Dick & Fitzgerald.
- Heather, H.E. (1876). Cards and Card Tricks. London: The Bazaar Office.
- Lover, Samuel (1837). Rory O'More. London: Bentley.
- Maxwell, William hamilton (1837). The Bivouac, Or, Stories of the Peninsular War. London, New York: George Routledge.
- Trebor, Eidrah (pseud. Robert Hardie) (1860). "Five and Ten" in Hoyle’s Games made Familiar. London: Ward & Lock. pp. 66–67.
- "W." (1833). "Andrew Murray, or the Effects of Gambling" in The Dublin Penny Journal, 5 October 1833. Dublin: P.D. Hardy.
