= King of Clubs =

The king of clubs is a playing card in the standard 52-card deck.

King of Clubs may also refer to:

- King of Clubs (Whig club), a Whig conversation club, founded in 1798
- King of Clubs (album), the debut solo album by Paul Gilbert
- King of Clubs (video game), a video game for the Nintendo Wii, DS, PSP, and PC
- King of Clubs (TV series), an adult reality series that aired on Playboy TV
- "The King of Clubs", a short story by Agatha Christie included in Poirot's Early Cases

== See also ==
- or
- King of Diamonds (disambiguation)
- King of Hearts (disambiguation)
- King of Spades (disambiguation)
- Jack of Clubs (disambiguation)
- Queen of Clubs (disambiguation)
- Ace of Clubs (disambiguation)
