= Jack of Spades =

Jack of Spades may refer to:

- Jack of spades (playing card)
- Jack of Spades (1960 film), a French drama directed by Yves Allégret
- Jack of Spades (2027 film), an American Gothic mystery film directed by Joel Coen
- Jack of Spades, a fictional character, a member of the villainous Royal Flush Gang in DC Comics
- Jack of Spades: A Tale of Suspense, a 2015 book by Joyce Carol Oates
- "The Jack of Spades", a historical novella in the 2007 book Special Assignments: The Further Adventures of Erast Fandorin by Boris Akunin

== See also ==
- Knave (disambiguation)
- Jack of Clubs (disambiguation)
- Jack of Diamonds (disambiguation)
- Jack of Hearts (disambiguation)
- Queen of Spades (disambiguation)
- King of Spades (disambiguation)
- Ace of Spades (disambiguation)
