= Jack of Diamonds =

Jack of Diamonds may refer to:

- Jack of diamonds (playing card)
- Jack of Diamonds (artists), Russian school
- The Jack of Diamonds, a 1949 film directed by Vernon Sewell
- Jack of Diamonds (1967 film), a film directed by Don Taylor
- Jack of Diamonds (TV series), a 1983 British comedy series featuring Dick Emery
- "Jack of Diamonds" (song), a traditional folk song
- Jack of Diamonds (novel), a 2012 novel by Bryce Courtenay

== See also ==
- or
- Jack of Clubs (disambiguation)
- Jack of Hearts (disambiguation)
- Jack of Spades (disambiguation)
- Queen of Diamonds (disambiguation)
- King of Diamonds (disambiguation)
- Ace of Diamonds (disambiguation)
- Knave (disambiguation)
- Diamond Jack (disambiguation)
- Jack Diamond (disambiguation)
