= King of Spades =

The king of spades is a playing card in the standard 52-card deck.

King of Spades may also refer to:

- King of Spades (novel), a 1966 novel by Frederick Manfred, the fourth book in The Buckskin Man Tales series
- King of Spades, a fictional character, a member of the villainous Royal Flush Gang in DC Comics

== See also ==
- or
- King of Clubs (disambiguation)
- King of Diamonds (disambiguation)
- King of Hearts (disambiguation)
- Jack of Spades (disambiguation)
- Queen of Spades (disambiguation)
- Ace of Spades (disambiguation)
- Ispade Rajavum Idhaya Raniyum (English : King of Spades & Queen of Hearts), a 2019 Indian Tamil language romantic thriller film
