= King of Diamonds =

The king of diamonds is a playing card in the standard 52-card deck.

King of Diamonds may also refer to:

- King of Diamonds (film), a 1936 Italian comedy film directed by Enrico Guazzoni
- King of Diamonds (TV series), a 1961–62 American TV series starring Broderick Crawford
- King of Diamonds, a fictional character, a member of the villainous Royal Flush Gang in DC Comics
- Harry Winston, an American jeweler.
- Lev Avnerovich Leviev, an Israeli businessman, philanthropist and investor.

== See also ==
- or
- King of Clubs (disambiguation)
- King of Hearts (disambiguation)
- King of Spades (disambiguation)
- Jack of Diamonds (disambiguation)
- Queen of Diamonds (disambiguation)
- Ace of Diamonds (disambiguation)
