= King of hearts =

Playing card

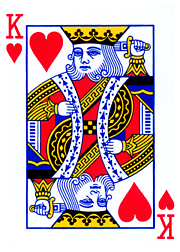
K♥ in a standard deck

Charles, K♥ in the Paris pattern

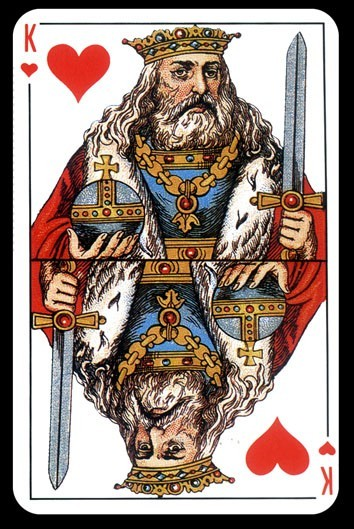
K♥ in a Russian deck

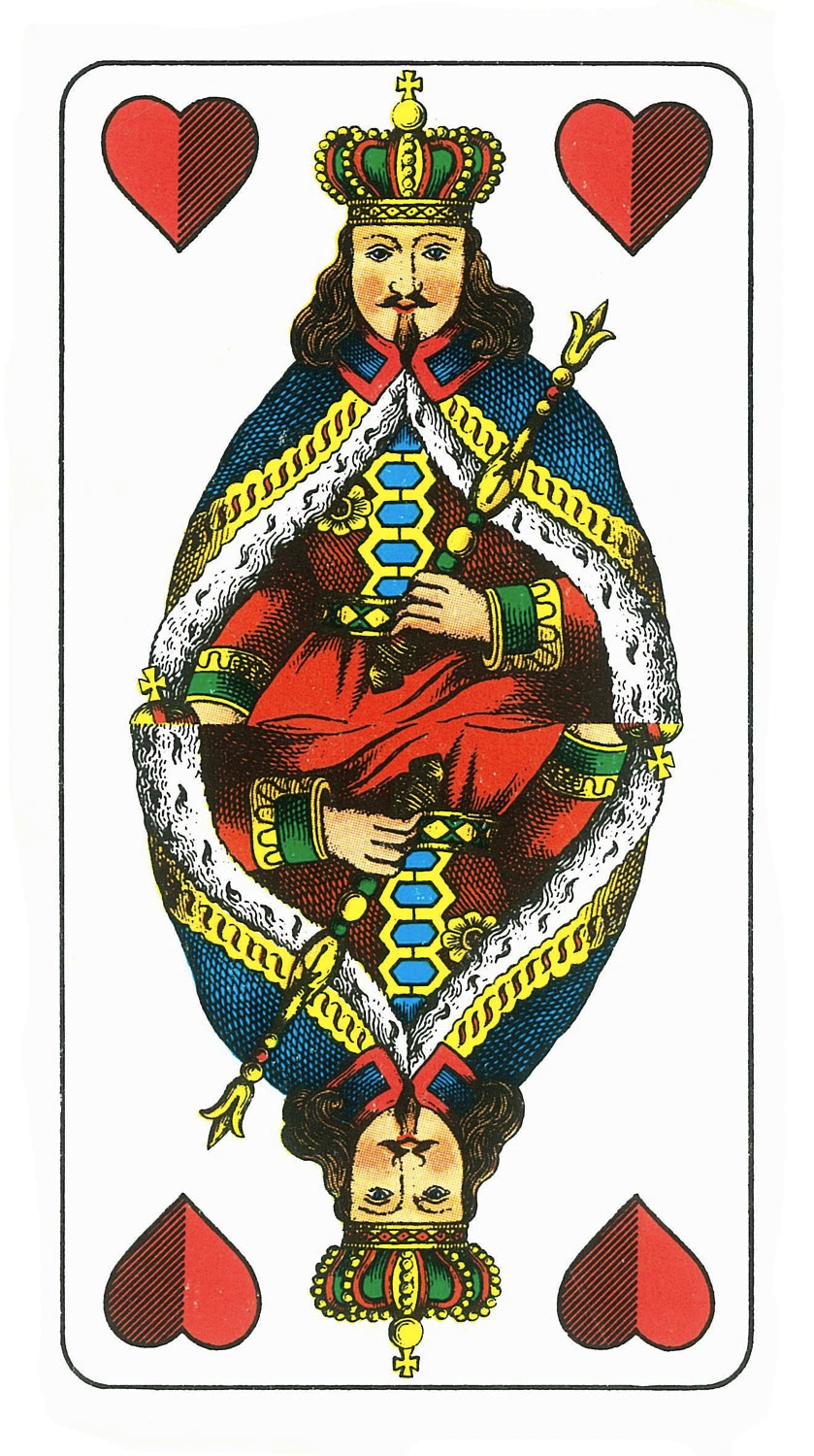
K♥ in a German deck

The king of hearts is a face card in decks of French-suited playing cards, depicting a king of the hearts (♥) suit and associated with the King of Franks Charlemagne. The card is also sometimes called the "Suicide King" due to an optical illusion where it appears the king is stabbing himself with a sword, leading to interpretations of sacrifice or the end of old orders. The king of hearts is also the only king without a mustache. This was due to the fact it was lost during the reproduction of the original design due to the wear and tear on the original wooden printing blocks used for mass production.

== Features ==
The king of hearts is one of the card games using the French and German suits (or it is called Herzkönig). In France, it is found in 32-card, 52-card and tarot decks.

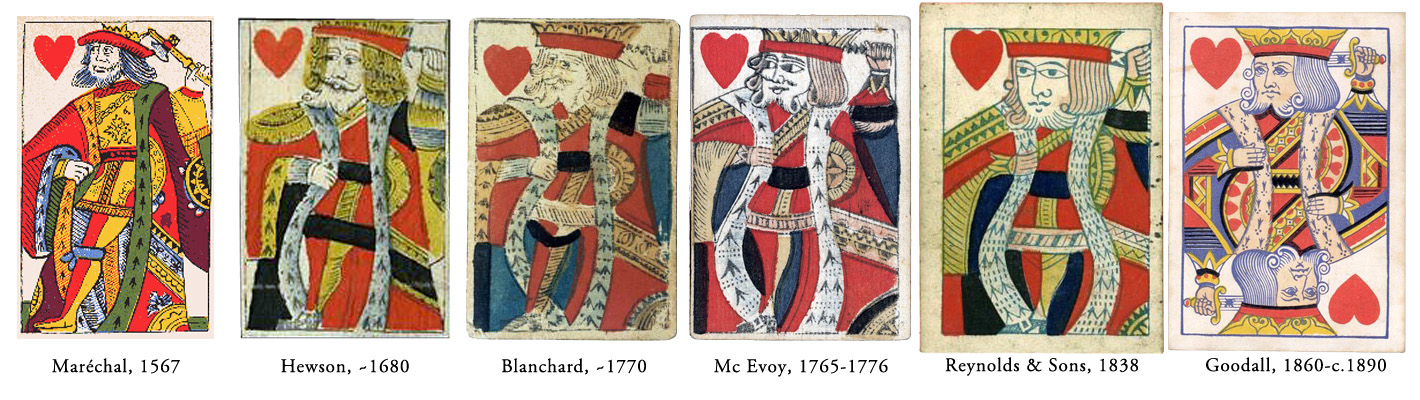
Evolution of the king of hearts from the Rouennais pattern to the English pattern

Generally speaking, the king of hearts is the highest card of hearts or immediately follows the ace of hearts; in belote, pinochle, soixante-six and other similar games, the ace and ten of hearts are higher than the king. The card precedes the queen of hearts in French-suited games, the Ober of hearts in German-suited games.

In other regional varieties of card games, the equivalent of the king of hearts is the king of cups (Latin suits) or roses (Swiss suits, Rosenkönig).

The king of hearts is called "bearded" in the game of the same name, an older version of the game of the Queen of Spades. In Nain Jaune, the king of hearts is one of the five cards for which a bet is allocated (along with the seven of diamonds, the ten of diamonds, the jack of clubs and the queen of spades).

== Card reading ==
In cartomancy, the king of hearts symbolizing a kind, spiritual, and honest man, or it can symbolize leadership and emotional intelligence, often associated with compassion and wisdom.

== Encoding ==
The king of hearts is encoded into Unicode with the code point U+1F0BE, as part of the playing cards Unicode block.

Character information
Preview	🂾	
Unicode name	PLAYING CARD KING OF HEARTS	
Encodings	decimal	hex
Unicode	127166	U+1F0BE
UTF-8	240 159 130 190	F0 9F 82 BE
UTF-16	55356 56510	D83C DCBE
Numeric character reference	&#127166;	&#x1F0BE;

== See also ==
- King (playing card)
- Standard 52-card deck
