= Maw (card game) =

Scottish and Irish card game

- Origin: Scotland
- Type: Trick-taking
- Players: 2
- Skills: Tactics & Strategy
- Cards: 52
- Deck: French
- Play: Clockwise
- Chance: Medium

Related games
- Twenty-five

Maw, formerly also mawe, was a Scottish card game for two players, popularised by James I, which is ancestral to the Irish national game of Twenty-five as well as the Canadian game of Forty-fives. Maw appears to be the same as five cards, a game described by Charles Cotton in the 17th century. The game disappeared from the literature after the period of the English Commonwealth, only to emerge in Ireland in the 19th century in new forms for two or more players and known as five and ten, spoil five and forty-five. These new variants are still played today, the latter has evolved into the Canadian game of forty-fives.

== History ==
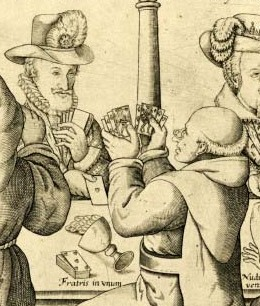
The game of maw depicted in Thomas Cockson's 1609 engraving The Revells of Christendome

The earliest records of the Scottish game of maw date to around 1550. James VI and I played maw, and it is frequently mentioned up to about 1650. Maw was played at Hengrave Hall at Christmas 1572. In 1580 it was described as "a playe at cardes grown out of the country, from the meanest, into credit at court with the greatest." On 14 December 1594 a lost play called The Set at Maw premiered at The Rose.

The game is mentioned in a 1608 play by Thomas Middleton in which a character replies: "Then I hope, you will be as good to us as the five-finger at maw," and in another in 1611 written by George Chapman and called May Day in which Lodovico rues his loss in a game of Maw against Lucretia: "You will the more muse at my fortune, or my oversights. For the game [at maw] stood, methought, upon my last two tricks, when I made sure of the set, and yet lost it, having the varlet [Jack] and the five finger to make two tricks." Thomas Cockson's 1609 engraving The Revells of Christendome includes a description of maw being played:

Hopes to winn something too, Maw is the game
at which hee playes, & Challengeth at the same
A Monk, who stakes a Challice : France setts gould,
& shuffles: the Monk cutts: but France (being bould)
Deales freely: Rubs : and the first card hee showes,
is the Five Finger, which being tourn’d up, goes
Cold to the Moncks hart : the next card, France sees
in his owne hand, is the Ace of hartes, "I Leeze"
Cryes out the Monck; sayes France, "Show what you have,"
the Monck could show France nothing but the Knave.

The former peasant's game became fashionable in court circles by the reign of James I and the king himself was a card player, a 1622 pamphlet alluded to this:

Ever in the very gaming Ordinaries, where men have scarce leisure to say grace, yet they take a tyme to censure your Majesties actions and that in their oulde school Termes. They say you have lost the fairest game at Maw that ever King had, for want of making the best advantage of the five finger, and playing the other helpes in time. That your owne Carde-holders play bootye, and give the signe out of your owne hande. That he you played withall hath ever been knowne for the greatest cheater in Christendome.

"Five finger" was the name of the trump 5 in the game. The Duke of Buckingham mentioned playing six sets of maw with Sir John Ayres in a letter to King James.

Along with many other old card games, maw died out in England during the time of the English Commonwealth (1649–1660). These games were succeeded by new ones primarily from Europe.

Charles Cotton calls its descendant in 1674 "five-cards", and gives the nickname five fingers to the five of trumps, extracted from the fact that the Irish word cúig means both 'five' and 'trick'. Others equated maw with five cards. Either way, A win at five-cards was worth five and a slam, ten.

By the early 19th century, two new variants of the two-hand game of maw or five cards had emerged. First was a version in which four played in two teams of two players that was called five and ten after the rewards for winning singly and double respectively. This name was also now applied to the old two-hand game. Second, the first round game version emerged with the inevitable consequence that there might not now be a winner if the hand was "spoilt" by no-one being able to take 3 tricks. As Samuel Lover explained in 1837, "The game they played was one which has long been a favourite in Ireland, and still continues to be so amongst the peasantry. It is called five and ten when played between two persons, or four engaged as partners; but when a larger number is enlisted, it is called spoil five, and a poule is played for. The same cards are influential in both games, though a totally different play is required... for in the former, the object is to win as many tricks as you can, while in the latter your own hand, if not sufficiently strong... is always sacrificed to the common good of "spoiling" the endeavours of a more fortunate holder of cards, and thereby increasing the poule... But in either form, this game is a great favourite with the peasantry, and is played by them with considerable skill..." Spoiled five is recorded as being played in the Peninsula War (1807–1814) by Irish troops.

Forty-five or five and forty had emerged by the early 19th century as a popular Irish variant in which each trick scored 5 points and game was 45. In 1837, in an article describing the atmosphere of the Fermoy racecourse, the reader is told that "if you prefer a stroll through the crowd to the music on the stands, where a couple of military bands are always stationed, or to seeing the horses rubbed down, you will see parties of four or six engaged at innumerable tables, playing, with what they are pleased to call cards, at the Irish game of forty-five. ...to your astonishment, the players throw [the cards] down as quick as thought, hitting the table a blow with the knuckles, whenever they play a good trump, that would peel the skin off any fists not as hard as horn. You will also perceive that they never take up a trick (or a lift as they call it) when won, but go on flinging down card after card, until the end of the deal, when they count the game, and if there should be any difference, the odds are, that five out of the six players are able to tell the order in which every card was played; but then they are all crack carroochs [gamblers], if you see silver on the table, for none else would venture so high in public. Sometimes they are so engrossed with the game, that they will not stop to look at a race on the flat, but nothing will keep them from a "go" over a country, and the stiffer the better."

Forty-five is already described as "old fashioned" by 1834. And in 1858, an Irish periodical describes twenty-five and forty-five as "our own old games" in which the five of trumps, called five fingers, was the best card, followed by the ace of hearts. Twenty-five eventually emerged to become the national card game of Ireland.

In the 20th century, forty-fives became popular in Canada along with a variant called auction forty-five, in which players bid in multiples of 5 up to 30 and game is 120. French Canadians took the game south into Massachusetts and New Hampshire in New England, where it continues to be popular, sometimes under the French name quarante-cinq.

Forty-fives is popularly played on the South Island of New Zealand, especially on the west coast which had a large number of Irish immigrants in the past who brought the game with them. Meanwhile forty-five is still played in many places in Ireland, where there are tournaments called 45 card drives.

== Rules ==
=== Maw ===
No detailed description of the rules for maw has survived, but a document published c. 1600 lists the "lawes at Mawe", in reality penalties for infractions. The Groom Porter was the officer responsible for games at the royal court of James I.

What is known is that it was a two-player game in which there were five tricks, the aim being to win at least three.

The text of the 1600 document containing the laws of maw follows:

The Groome-porters lawes at Mawe, to be obserued in fulfilling the due orders of the Game.

1. IF you chaunge hands, it is the losse of the Set,
2. If you renounce, it is the losse of the Set.
3. If you leade when your Mate shoulde, it is the losse of that game and vied cardes.
4. If you lose dealing, it is the losse of fower cardes, but if the loser of the dealing deale not againe, you acquite the fower, and no gaine to either of both parties.
5. If you looke either on ye asked carde, or the bottome carde, it is the losse of that game and vied cardes, in whom the fault is found.
6. If you roub (not hauing the Ace) you lose fower, & al the vied cards although you lay downe the same carde which you tooke vp.
7. If you make out the carde when your Mate rubbeth it is the losse of fower, for the roubber must make out the carde himselfe.
8. If you turne vp the Ace of Hartes you gaine fower thereby.
9. If you turne vp the Ace of Hartes, and thereby make either partie aboue xxvi [points] the contrary part must haue Liuings, but if the contrary parte bee xxv, by meanes whereof Liuings sets them out, then is he who turned vp the Ace of Hartes to make for the Set, so that he make not one Game nor the first Tricke, without the consent of both parties.
10. The partie that asketh a carde, may not vie any carde, before the first tricke be played.
11. You may not vie it after your card is led, but the contrary part may.
12. Three cardes crossed, no carde by any meanes giuen backe.
13. Neither partie may giue backe his owne vied card, though none be crossed.
14. You may not aske a carde to set the contrary parte or your selfe at Liuings or out.
15. Prouided alwaies, that if the contrary parte bee xxiii or aboue, by reason that fower sets the other partie behinde the Liuinges, it shalbe lawfull for the partie which is behinde to aske a carde, although the carde so asked put the other to Liuings.
16. Prouided also that if you meane to lead a helpe, you may vie it vpon your owne asked carde, so as it be done before the helpe be out of your hand, the contrary part may pledge you a card after he seeth your helpe vpon the boord, so as it be done before his owne card be played.

From these "laws", it can be deduced that:

- There were two players.
- A hand was called a "game" and several games made a "set"
- After the deal and before play, players could either "ask for" a card from stock or vie but not both.
- A player who folds before play, loses 4 points, unless that player hands over the deal in which case no points are won or lost.
- A player with the ace of hearts could "rob" the upcard
- Turning up the ace of hearts scored 4 points
- During play, players had to follow suit and could vie before playing a card, but not once it was played
- Game was 26 points

=== Five cards (1674) ===
Five cards may have been the same as maw. It is described by Charles Cotton in 1674 as an Irish game, played "in that Kingdom... for considerable sums of money". A summary of his rules is as follows:

Two players are dealt five cards each and turns the next for trump. The top three trumps are:

- Trump 5 – five fingers
- ♥A
- Trump Kn

Otherwise, red suits rank in their natural order, aces low, while the pip cards in the black suits rank inversely as in ombre i.e. K > Q > (J) > (A) > 2 > 3 > 4 > 5 > 6 > 7 > 8 > 9 > 10. Dealer asks if non-dealer will "five it"; if the latter agrees, the next card is turned for trump; otherwise they play with the first trump.

There are five tricks and the winner is the player to take at least 3 trumps, scoring 5 points for a normal win and 10 if all tricks were taken. Whist rules of play are assumed, but not stated.

=== Five and ten (1830) ===
This "favourite game of the Irish" for two to four players is first described in 1830 in a Scottish publication by Robert Hardie. Four play as two teams of two. A full pack is used in which the order of the top trumps has changed slightly. In detail the cards rank (high to low) as follows when the respective suits are trumps:

- Hearts: 5♥ Kn♥ A♥ K♥ Q♥ 10♥ 9♥ 8♥ 7♥ 6♥ 4♥ 3♥ 2♥
- Diamonds: 5♦ Kn♦ A♥ A♦ K♦ Q♦ 10♦ 9♦ 8♦ 7♦ 6♦ 4♦ 3♦ 2♦
- Spades: 5♠ Kn♠ A♥ A♠ K♠ Q♠ 2♠ 3♠ 4♠ 6♠ 7♠ 8♠ 9♠ 10♠
- Clubs: 5♣ Kn♣ A♥ A♣ K♣ Q♣ 2♣ 3♣ 4♣ 6♣ 7♣ 8♣ 9♣ 10♣

When not trumps the cards rank in their side suits as follows:

- Hearts: K♥ Q♥ Kn♥ 10♥ 9♥ 8♥ 7♥ 6♥ 5♥ 4♥ 3♥ 2♥
- Diamonds: K♦ Q♦ Kn♦ 10♦ 9♦ 8♦ 7♦ 6♦ 5♦ 4♦ 3♦ 2♦ A♦
- Spades: A♠ K♠ Q♠ Kn♠ 2♠ 3♠ 4♠ 5♠ 6♠ 7♠ 8♠ 9♠ 10♠
- Clubs: A♣ K♣ Q♣ Kn♣ 2♣ 3♣ 4♣ 5♣ 6♣ 7♣ 8♣ 9♣ 10♣

Each hand is a complete game in itself and the aim is to win the majority of the 5 tricks, called a Five and earning a single stake for the winner. Taking all 5 tricks is a Ten and earns double stakes i.e. the loser pays a second stake directly to the winner. (Note: In the four-hand game, each loser pays one of the winners.)

If four play, they cut for partnerships, the two lowest playing the two highest. Players ante equal stakes and cut for deal, lowest wins. The cards are cut again and 5 dealt to each player in twos and threes, the next being turned for trump. If the turnup is an Ace, the dealer takes it and discards another card in exchange. A player holding the trump Ace either picks up the turnup or turns it over. (Note: Presumably discarding a card in exchange for the turnup.) Players must follow suit, except that a player holding any of the top three cards may renounce it unless a higher trump is played.

Hardie mentions a three-hand game in passing in which, if no-one takes 3 tricks, the hands is 'spoilt' and the stakes carried forward and increased. This is the variant usually known as Spoil Five, q.v. His description is reprinted in the 1845 and 1857 American Hoyles as well as Hardie's 1860 edition of his book.

=== Spoil five (1863) ===
Mentioned as early as in 1829 in Ireland, the first rules were published by George Pardon who says that this "thoroughly Irish game [is] very little known out of the Emerald Isle." The key difference is that this is a round game in which players play for themselves. As a result, there may be no winner of the five-trick hand, in which case it is said to be "spoilt" or "spoiled"; the stakes are left in place and played for in the next hand along with any new stakes. Another apparent change was to the rules of play which were as in all fours, not whist, although this interpretation was not initially adopted by other authors.

Four or five may play but five are best. Players ante an agreed stake into the pool prior to each hand and after each spoil (or only the dealer does so, as agreed at the start). A full pack of 52 cards is used. The cards are dealt and the first to receive a knave becomes the first dealer. The pack is shuffled and cut; then five cards each are dealt; first two cards and then three. The next is turned for trump and placed on top of the stock. A player with the ♥A may rob the upcard, exchanging it for a card of his choice which is laid away, face down. If the dealer turns an ace, he may rob it likewise. Robbing is optional.

Cards rank as in five and ten above. If trumps are led, a player with any of the top three trumps need not play it even if it is the only trump held, but may legally renounce; this privilege is forfeited if a higher trump has been led. "When a card, not a trump, is led, a similar card must be played if in hand, unless the player trumps it." This implies that a player may always play a trump to a side suit lead as an alternative to following suit. (Note: If this interpretation is right, it is the first time that all four rules appear for any game of this family since, in five cards and five and ten, whist rules applied; i.e. players had to follow suit if able. Subsequent mid-19th century authors tend to equate spoil(t) five with five and ten and simply reprint Hardie's whist rules. This begins to change with Heather in 1876 who clear gives all fours rules for all spoil five, but whist rules for twenty-five and forty-five. The 1885 American Hoyle applies all four rules to forty-five as well as spoilt five and the 1887 edition assumes all fours rules for twenty-five as well. Thereafter the new rule appears to become embedded, see e.g. Hoffmann (1891) and Foster (1897).) Lacking a card of the led suit, a player may play any card.

A player must take at least 3 tricks to win, otherwise it is a spoil. A player making the first 3 tricks may go for a jink i.e. attempt to take the remaining 2 tricks. If successful, the player sweeps the pool and, in addition, is paid the basic stake by each player. If unsuccessful, the player loses and it is considered a spoil.

=== Forty-five (1864) ===
American author and card player William Brisbane Dick reprinted Pardon's rules in 1864. But for the first time rules for the variant forty-five are given. Again the game "is a great favorite with the Irish." It is described as a four-hand game, played to the left. All is as in Pardon with the following exceptions:

- If the dealer turns up a King of Ace it scores 5.
- A player holding the trump King must, when due to play, "lay out a card for it" and, if the trump Ace is not in play, that player picks up the turnup. If the Ace is in play its holder 'robs the trump' instead.
- Each trick scores 5 and the best trump played also scores 5
- There is thus no 'spoiling'
- Game is 45
- The winner of the game takes the stakes.
- Players may agree that only the trump Ace may rob the upcard and that the dealer may take the Ace if it is turned up.
- Whist (not All Fours) rules of play are followed.

Under the name five and forty a rudimentary form of the game is described as early as 1831 by Eliza Leslie in a book for American girls. Each trick is worth 5 points and forty-five is game. However, she makes no mention of the three top trumps, players need not follow suit and there is no robbing.

== Bibliography ==
- _ (c. 1600). "Lawes at Mawe" in Ancient Ballads and Broadsides published in England in the sixteenth Century... as preserved in the Library of Henry Huth, London, 1867. Online version by the University of Michigan.
- "Ranger" of Ballyhooly (1837). "Irish Country Racing" in The New Sporting Magazine. Vol. 13, No. 75. July 1837. London: Walter Spiers. pp. 143–156.
- _ (1858). The Irish Quarterly Review, No 29, Vol. 8. April 1858. Dublin: W.B. Kelly.
- Cotton, Charles (1674). The Compleat Gamester. A.M, London.
- "Trumps" (William Brisbane Dick) (1864). The American Hoyle. NY: Dick & Fitzgerald.
- Dilke, Charles Wentworth (1815). "May Day: A Comedy by George Chapman" in Old English Plays, Vol. 4. London: Whittingham & Rowland. pp. 1–114.
- Dyce, Revd. Alexander (1840). The Works of Thomas Middleton, Vol. 2. London: Edward Lumley.
- Hall, Arthur (c. 1580). Letter preserved in the British Museum. Cited by Singer, Samuel Weller (1816). Researches into the History of Playing Cards. London: Bensley & Son. p. 258.
- Henslowe (c. 1600). Henslowe's Diary, 10^{v}, 2nd edn, ed. by R.A. Foakes. Cambridge: CUP.
- Johnson, Mr. (1829). "The Agriculture of Ireland" in The Journal of Agriculture, Vol. 1. pp.
- Leslie, Eliza (1831). The American Girl's Book. Boston: Munroe & Francis; NY: C.S. Francis.
- Johnston, Edward (1829). "On the Agriculture of Ireland" in The Journal of Agriculture. Vol. 1. pp. 442–454.
- Lover, Samuel (1837). Rory O'More. London: Bentley.
- Maxwell, William Hamilton (1837). The Bivouac, Or, Stories of the Peninsular War. London, New York: George Routledge.
- Morgan, Lady (1834). "Obsoletisms" in The Literary Journal, and Weekly Register of Science and the Arts ed. by Albert G. Green. 22 February 1834. Providence: Joseph Knowles. p. 298.
- Pardon, George Frederick (1863). The Card-Player. London: Routledge, Warne & Routledge.
- Parlett, David (1996). Oxford Dictionary of Card Games. Oxford: Oxford University Press. ISBN 0-19-869173-4
- Pennycook, Andrew (1982). The Book of Card Games. St. Albans: Grenada. ISBN 0-583-12910-2.
- Strutt, Joseph (1801). The Sports and Pastimes of the People of England. London: Methuen.
- Trebor, E. [Robert Hardie] (1830). Hoyle Made Familiar. Edinburgh: Stirling & Kenney.
- Troath, Tom Tell (1622). Tom Tell Troath or a Free Discourse touching the Manners of the Tyme.
- "Trumps" (William Brisbane Dick) (1864). The American Hoyle. NY: Dick & Fitzgerald.
