= Diamond Jack =

Diamond Jack may refer to:

- Diamond Jack, a Michigan car ferry
- "Diamond Jack", a song by Wishbone Ash from the 1977 album Front Page News
- "Diamond Jack", an episode from the 1982–83 season of Three's Company
- Diamond Jack and the Queen of Pain, a 1983 album by Kevin Ayers
- Diamond Jack Duggan, a henchman of The Joker in Batman comics
- Louis Alterie (1886–1935), American gangster

== See also ==
- Jack Diamond (disambiguation)
- Jack of Diamonds (disambiguation)
- John Diamond (disambiguation)
