= Ace of hearts =

Playing card

Ace of hearts

The ace of hearts (A♥) is a card in a deck of playing cards: the ace in the suit of hearts (♥). There is one ace of hearts in a standard deck of 52 cards.

== Gameplay ==
In the 17th century French game Le Jeu de la Guerre, the ace of hearts represented the cavalry.

In the game Bankafalet, the second best card in the deck is the ace of hearts.

In the Irish game Five Cards, the ace of hearts is the second highest card in the pack, below the five fingers (aka five of trumps).

== Symbolism ==
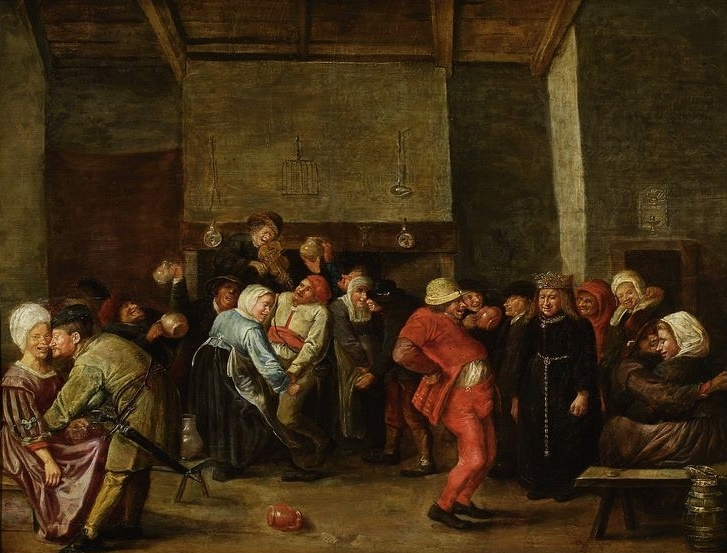
Objects used in a 17th-century painting in the National Museum in Warsaw depicting a wedding in a peasant house are allusion to indecent final of the feast - pitcher symbolizing a woman and playing cards, a symbol of a man with ace of hearts having a clear erotic meaning and nine of club a symbolic of troubles and mental frustration.

=== Literature ===
American author Zane Grey used the cartomantic meaning of playing cards in his novels. For example, in his book The Border Legion, he describes the character Joan Randle as an Ace of Hearts, after she "outwit[s] and outtalk[s] her would-be-seducer, outlaw Kells". The very same card is pinned by Kells to a tree, where he shoots at with many bullets, "every one of which touch[ing] the red heart and one of them...obliterat[ing] it", and then signs his name below. This foreshadows the climax described above. These uses of the ace of hearts by Grey utilize the many symbolic meanings of the card including intimidation, eroticism, and death.

Referring to the Jesuits, the author of The true history of Pope Joan says: "a certain prince of ours did compare unto them a game of cardes, in which the gamesters like loadem play and bring them forth last that are of most price, to beat downe the adverse play: or like the ace of hearts at Mawe (the game which is with us called Rumstich)". This is said to provide the answer to the origin of the card game Mawe.

In Tess of the D'Urbervilles by Thomas Hardy, the murder of the main villain is given away by a spot on the ceiling that "speedily grew as large as the palm of [Mrs. Brooks'] hand" and "[Mrs. Brooks] could perceive that it was red". The narrative goes on to say: "the oblong white ceiling, with this scarlet blot in the midst, had the appearance of a gigantic ace of hearts".

=== Asexuality ===
Ace cards are used to symbolise asexuality, in reference the phonetic shortening of that word. The ace of hearts symbolises romantic asexuality; those who are both asexual and aromantic use the ace of spades as a symbol.

== Encoding ==
The ace of hearts is encoded into Unicode with the code point U+1F0B1, as part of the playing cards Unicode block.

Character information
Preview	🂱	
Unicode name	PLAYING CARD ACE OF HEARTS	
Encodings	decimal	hex
Unicode	127153	U+1F0B1
UTF-8	240 159 130 177	F0 9F 82 B1
UTF-16	55356 56497	D83C DCB1
Numeric character reference	&#127153;	&#x1F0B1;

== See also ==
- Ace of Spades
