= Jack Diamond =

Jack Diamond may refer to:

- Jack Diamond (architect) (1932–2022), Canadian architect
- Jack Diamond (Canadian businessman) (1909–2001), Canadian businessman and philanthropist
- Jack Diamond, better known as Legs Diamond (1897–1931), Irish-American gangster in Philadelphia and New York City during the Prohibition era
- Jack Diamond (radio personality) (born 1954), American radio personality
- Jack Diamond (comedian) (1941–2016), British comedy entertainer
- Jack Diamond, Baron Diamond (1907–2004), British politician and peer
- Jack Diamond (footballer, born 1910) (1910–1961), English footballer
- Jack Diamond (footballer, born 2000), English footballer

== See also ==
- Diamond Jack (disambiguation)
- Jack of Diamonds (disambiguation)
- John Diamond (disambiguation)
