= Ace of Diamonds =

The ace of diamonds is a playing card in the standard 52-card deck.

Ace of Diamonds may also refer to:

- El as de oros (English: The Ace of Diamonds), a 1968 Mexican film, directed by Chano Urueta
- Ace of Diamond, a Japanese baseball manga and anime series

== See also ==
- or
- Ace of Clubs (disambiguation)
- Ace of Hearts (disambiguation)
- Ace of Spades (disambiguation)
- Jack of Diamonds (disambiguation)
- Queen of Diamonds (disambiguation)
- King of Diamonds (disambiguation)
- The Card Sharp with the Ace of Diamonds, a painting produced around 1636-1638 by Georges de La Tour
