= The Diamond Queen =

The Diamond Queen may refer to:

- The Diamond Queen (1921 film)
- Diamond Queen (1940 film)
- The Diamond Queen (1953 film)
- The Diamond Queen (TV programme)

== See also ==
- Queen of Diamonds (disambiguation)
