= Queen of Diamonds =

The queen of diamonds is a playing card in the standard 52-card deck.

Queen of Diamonds may also refer to:

== Arts and entertainment ==
- Karyssia: Queen of Diamonds, a 1987 graphic adventure game
- the title character of "Marsha, Queen of Diamonds", a Batman TV series episode
- Queen of Diamonds, a 1991 American independent film by Nina Menkes
- "Queen of Diamonds", an episode of Laramie
- "The Queen of Diamonds", a story arc in Pep Comics

== People ==
- Mabel Boll (1893–1923), American socialite nicknamed the "Queen of Diamonds" for the amount of jewelry she wore

== See also ==
- or
- Queen of Clubs (disambiguation)
- Queen of Hearts (disambiguation)
- Queen of Spades (disambiguation)
- Jack of Diamonds (disambiguation)
- King of Diamonds (disambiguation)
- Ace of Diamonds (disambiguation)
- Muzahim Sa'b Hassan al-Tikriti, Air Defense Forces Commander of Iraq (1999-2003) under Saddam Hussein, the queen of diamonds in the US deck of most-wanted Iraqi playing cards
- Diamond Queen (disambiguation)
