= Queen of Spades =

The queen of spades is a playing card in the standard 52-card deck.

Queen of Spades may also refer to:

- "The Queen of Spades" (story), an 1833 short story by Alexander Pushkin
  - The Queen of Spades (opera), an 1890 opera by Tchaikovsky
  - The Queen of Spades (1910 film), a Russian short film
  - The Queen of Spades (1916 film), a Russian adaptation by Yakov Protazanov
  - The Queen of Spades (1927 film), a German silent film
  - The Queen of Spades (Prokofiev), a score by Sergei Prokofiev for the 1937 film La dame de pique
  - The Queen of Spades (1949 film), a British film by Thorold Dickinson
  - The Queen of Spades (1960 film), a Russian adaptation of Tchaikovsky's opera
  - The Queen of Spades (1982 film), a Russian adaptation by Igor Maslennikov
  - The Queen of Spades (2016 film), a Russian thriller film by Pavel Lungin
- The Queen of Spades (novel), a 1956 novel by Oiva Paloheimo
  - The Queen of Spades (1959 film), a Finnish film by Maunu Kurkvaara
- Natalya Golitsyna (1741–1838), Russian princess nicknamed the "Queen of Spades" because she was the inspiration of Pushkin's short story
- Shayna Baszler (born 1980), mixed martial artist and professional wrestler nicknamed the Queen of Spades
- "Queen of Spades" (song), a 1978 song by Styx
- Pique Dame (Suppé) (Queen of Spades), an 1864 opera by Suppé
- La Dame de pique (opera) (Queen of Spades), an 1850 opera by Fromental Halévy
- Queen of Spades, a racist term describing white women who fetishize Black men: see Race and sexuality#Black men

== See also ==
- or
- Queen of Clubs (disambiguation)
- Queen of Diamonds (disambiguation)
- Queen of Hearts (disambiguation)
- Jack of Spades (disambiguation)
- King of Spades (disambiguation)
- Ace of Spades (disambiguation)
- Mohammed Hamza Zubeidi (1938–2005), Prime Minister of Iraq from 1991 to 1993, the queen of spades in the US deck of most-wanted Iraqi playing cards
