= Varlet (disambiguation) =

Varlet (/ˈvɑːrlət/) can refer to:

- Valet
- Varlet (video game)
- Knight's squire
- Valet de chambre, a court appointment introduced in the late Middle Ages
- Rogue (vagrant) or unprincipled person

== Surname ==
- Dominique Marie Varlet (1678–1742), Roman Catholic bishop during the church's Post Reformation Netherlands period
- Jean-François Varlet (1764–1837), leader of the Enragé faction in the French Revolution
- Charles Varlet (1635–1692), real name of La Grange (actor), member of the troupe of Molière
- Antoine Varlet (1893–1940), Belgian architect

== See also ==
- Knave (disambiguation)
