= Ace of Clubs =

The ace of clubs is a playing card in the standard 52-card deck.

Ace of Clubs may also refer to:

- Ace of Clubs (comics), a DC Comics supervillain
- Ace o' Clubs, a DC Comics bar owned by Bibbo Bibbowski
- Ace of Clubs (musical), a 1949 musical by Noël Coward
- Ace of Clubs Records, a British record label owned by Decca Records
- The Ace of Clubs, an alias used by British recording artist Luke Vibert
- Ace of Clubs (film), a 1925 silent Western film by J. P. McGowan
- L'As de trèfle (The Ace of Clubs) for Sarah Bernhardt Pierre Decourcelle 1882

== See also ==
- or
- Ace of Diamonds (disambiguation)
- Ace of Hearts (disambiguation)
- Ace of Spades (disambiguation)
- Jack of Clubs (disambiguation)
- Queen of Clubs (disambiguation)
- King of Clubs (disambiguation)
