= John Dimond =

John Dimond may refer to:

- John Dimond (fencer) (1892–1968), American fencer who competed in the 1920 Summer Olympics
- John H. Dimond (1918–1985), Justice of the Alaska Supreme Court

== See also ==
- John Diamond (disambiguation)
