= Queen of Clubs =

The queen of clubs is a playing card in the standard 52-card deck.

Queen of Clubs may also refer to:

== Film ==
- Queen of Clubs (film), a 1966 Greek film, directed by George Skalenakis
- La dame de trèfle, a 2009 French film; se Laure Gardette

== Music ==
- Queen of Clubs Trilogy: Ruby Edition, an album by Nadia Ali
- Queen of Clubs Trilogy: Onyx Edition, an album by Nadia Ali
- Queen of Clubs Trilogy: Diamond Edition, an album by Nadia Ali
- "Queen of Clubs", a 1974 song by KC and the Sunshine Band from Do It Good
- "Queen of Clubs", a 2016 song by Azealia Banks from Slay-Z

== See also ==
- or
- Queen of Diamonds (disambiguation)
- Queen of Hearts (disambiguation)
- Queen of Spades (disambiguation)
- Jack of Clubs (disambiguation)
- King of Clubs (disambiguation)
- Ace of Clubs (disambiguation)
