= Knave =

Knave may refer to:

- A rogue (vagrant), a rascal, deceitful fellow, a dishonest man
- Knave (playing card), another name for the jack in card games
- Knave (British magazine), a British softcore pornographic magazine published 1968–2015
- Knave (American magazine), a short-lived American men's magazine published in 1959
- The Knave, the codename of Arlecchino, a character in 2020 video game Genshin Impact
- The Knave, a Welsh hillfort also known as Deborah's Hole Camp
- In Knights and Knaves logic puzzles, a person who always lies
- A male domestic worker, a person who works within the employer's household (kitchen boy in Middle English)

== See also ==
- Jack (playing card)
- Knave of Hearts (disambiguation)
- Varlet (disambiguation)
