= Knave of Clubs =

Former pub in Shoreditch, London

Coordinates: 51.523987°N 0.0742545°W

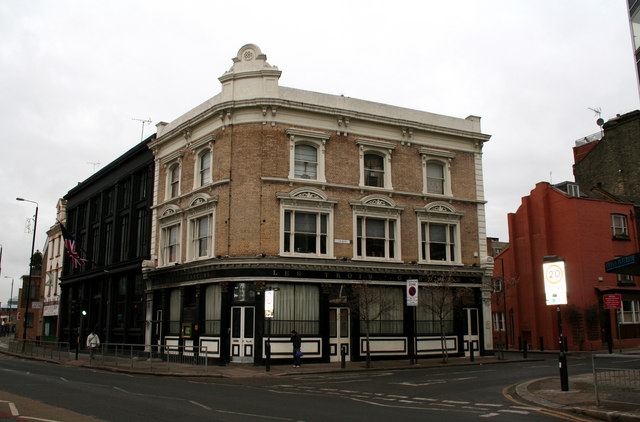
The Knave of Clubs

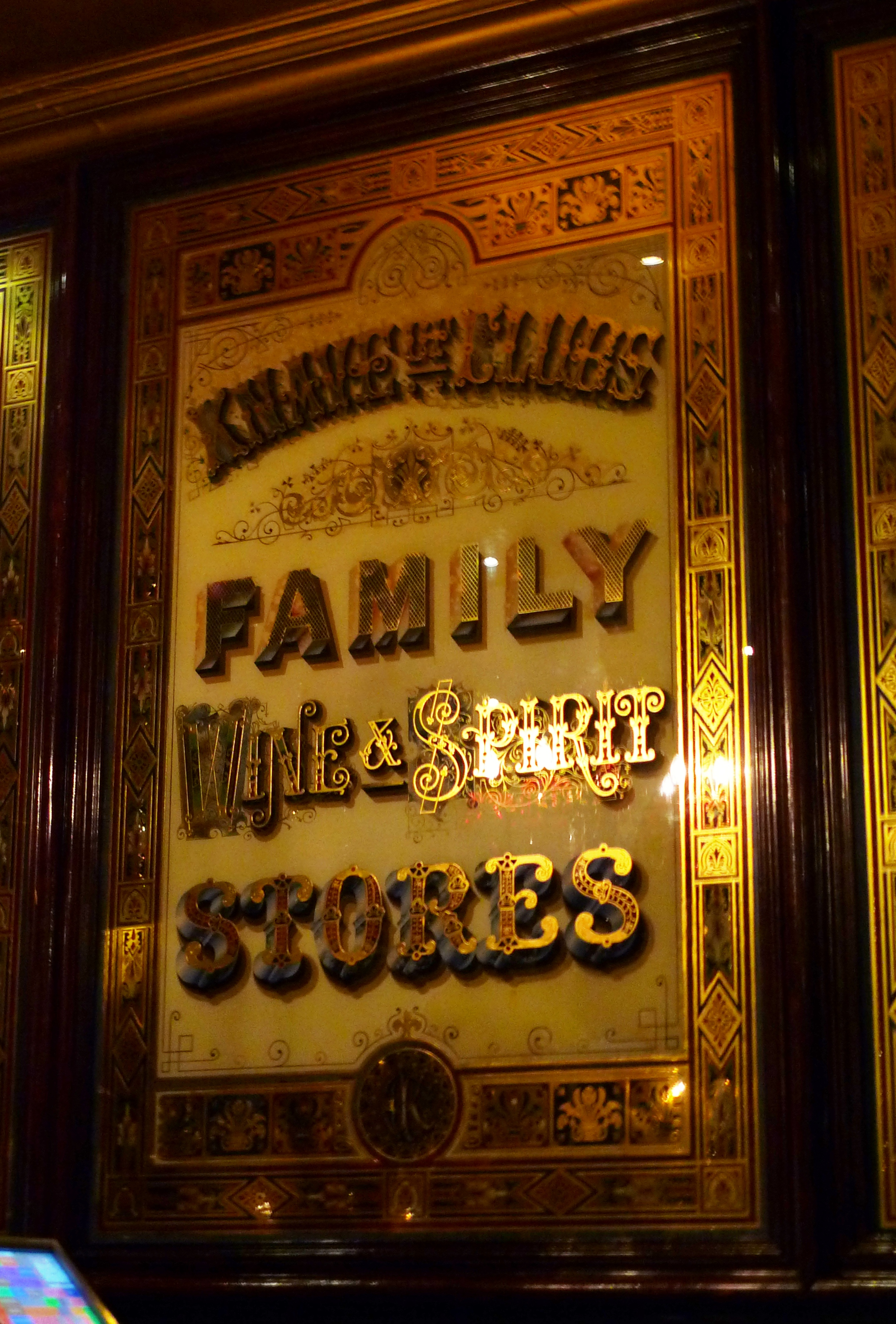
Knave of Clubs etched glass in the pub's interior

The Knave of Clubs is a former pub at 25 Bethnal Green Road, Shoreditch, London E1. It closed in July 1994, later re-opening as Les Trois Garçons, a restaurant. The pub is due to re-open under its original name in February 2025.

It is a Grade II listed building, built in dating as far back as 1735.
