= John Diamond =

John Diamond may refer to:

- John Diamond (bridge), American bridge player
- John Diamond (dancer) (1823–1857), Irish-American dancer
- John Diamond (journalist) (1953–2001), British broadcaster and journalist
- John Diamond, Baron Diamond (1907–2004), British Labour politician
- Jon P. Diamond (born 1957), American entrepreneur
- John T. Diamond (1912–2001), New Zealand historian
- John Diamond (doctor) (1934–2021), American doctor
- John Diamond, 1980 children's novel by author Leon Garfield

== See also ==
- Jack Diamond (disambiguation)
- John Dimond (disambiguation)
- Jonny Dymond (born 1970), British journalist
