= Deborah's Hole Camp =

Iron Age fort in Wales

Coordinates: 51.5545°N 4.2635°W

Deborah's Hole Camp (also known as The Knave) is an Iron Age hillfort situated atop the cliff above Deborah's Hole cave in the unitary authority of Swansea, Wales. It is crossed by the Wales Coast Path.
