= Knave (American magazine) =

1950s American men's magazine

- Knave magazine, January 1959
- Categories: Men's magazine
- First issue: 1959; 67 years ago
- Final issue: 1959
- Company: Loki publishing
- Country: United States

Knave was a short-lived American men's magazine which was published in 1959 in White Plains, New York by Loki Publishing. Edited by Harvey Willig and appearing on a bimonthly schedule commencing January 1959, Knave is noted for including stories by the American science fiction writer Harlan Ellison. Ellison's short story "The Pied Piper of Love" was first published in the March 1959 issue, whilst "The Man with the Green Nose", also known as "Survivor No. 1", and co-written with Henry Slesar, first appeared in the September 1959 issue.
