= Ace =

Playing card

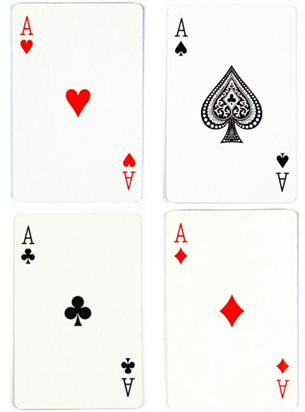
Four aces from a standard 52-card deck

An ace is a playing card, die or domino with a single pip. In the standard French deck, an ace has a single suit symbol (a heart, diamond, spade, or a club) located in the middle of the card, sometimes large and decorated, especially in the case of the ace of spades. This embellishment on the ace of spades started when King James VI of Scotland and I of England required an insignia of the printing house to be printed on the ace of spades. The mark served to identify the printing house and to confirm payment of a stamp tax. Although this legal requirement ended in 1960, many card manufacturers have continued the custom. In other countries the stamp and embellishments are usually found on ace cards; clubs in France, diamonds in Russia, and hearts in Genoa because they have the most blank space.

== Etymology ==
The word "ace" (/ˈeɪs/, EYSS) comes from the Old French word as (from Latin 'as') meaning 'a unit', from the name of a small Roman coin. It originally meant the side of a die with only one pip, before it was a term for a playing card. Since this was the lowest roll of the die, it traditionally meant 'bad luck' in Middle English, but as the ace is often the highest playing card, its meaning has since changed to mean 'high-quality, excellence'.

== Ace promotion ==
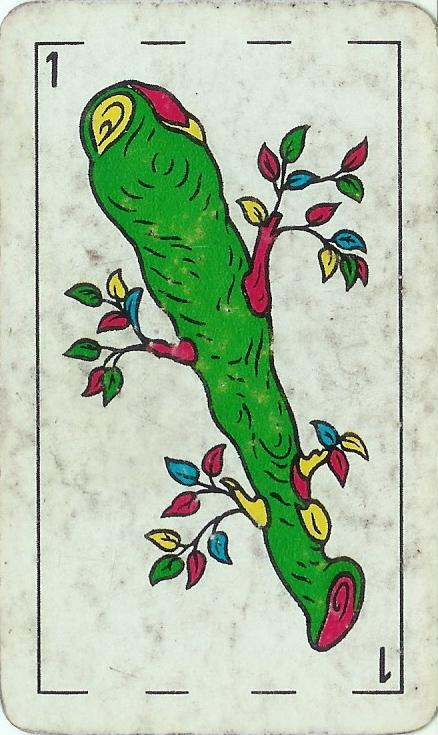
Ace of batons ("bastos") from a Spanish deck

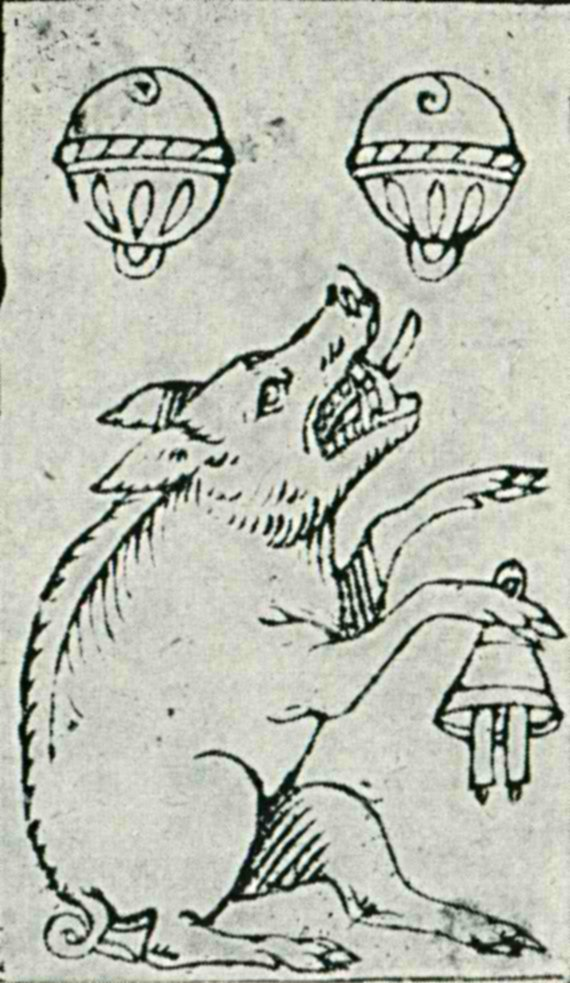
Sau (Vienna, 1573)

Historically, the ace had a low value and this still holds in many popular European games (in fact many European decks, including the French- and Latin-suited decks, do not use the "A" index, instead keeping the numeral "1"). The modern convention of "ace high", in which the ace is the highest card of the house, seemed to have happened in stages. Card games, before they arrived in Europe, had suits that were in reverse ranking. In the Chinese game of Mǎ diào, which lacked court cards, the suit of coins was inverted so the 1 of Coins was the highest in its suit. In the Ganjifa games of Persia, India, and Arabia, only the pip cards of half the suits were reversed so the 1 ranked just below the lowest court card. This convention carried over to early European games like Ombre, Maw, and Trionfi (Tarot). During the 15th and 16th centuries, the ranking of all suits were becoming progressive. A few games from this period like Triomphe, has the ace between the ten and the jack. The earliest known game in which the ace is the highest card of its suit is Trappola. In ace–ten games like brusquembille, pinochle and sixty-six, the ace dragged the 10 along with it to the top so the ranking became A-10-K. Some games promoted the deuces and treys too like Put, Truc, and Tressette. "King high" games were still being made in the 17th century, for example cribbage. Many games, such as poker and blackjack, allow the player to choose whether the ace is used as a high or low card. This duality allows players in some other games to use it as both at once; some variants of Rummy allow players to form melds, of rank K-A-2 or similar. This is known as "going around the corner".

It was not only the French deck which experienced this promotion, but some games involving the Swiss and German deck also evolved into using the Daus (deuce) as the highest card. The ace had disappeared during the 15th century, so the deuce took its place. The Ass (ace) and Daus (deuce) were conflated into a single card and the names are used interchangeably along with Sau (sow) as early cards of that rank depicted a pig. Some decks in southern Germany use "A" for the index because "D" is reserved for Dame (Queen) in French-suited decks. Confusion is also avoided as German-suited decks lack numbered cards below "7" or "6". Despite using French-suited cards, Russians call the Ace a Deuce (tuz), a vestige of a period when German cards were predominant in central and eastern Europe.

== In Unicode ==
The aces are included in the Playing Cards:

- U+1F0A1 🂡 PLAYING CARD ACE OF SPADES
- U+1F0B1 🂱 PLAYING CARD ACE OF HEARTS
- U+1F0C1 🃁 PLAYING CARD ACE OF DIAMONDS
- U+1F0D1 🃑 PLAYING CARD ACE OF CLUBS

== See also ==
- Ace of Clubs (disambiguation)
- Ace of Diamonds (disambiguation)
- Ace of Hearts (disambiguation)
- Ace of Spades (disambiguation)
