= Ace of Spades =

The ace of spades is commonly thought of as the highest-ranking playing card in the standard 52-card deck.

Ace of Spades may also refer to:

== Music ==
- Ace of Spades (Motörhead album), 1980
  - "Ace of Spades" (song), title song from the album
- Ace of Spades (De Mthuda and Ntokzin album), 2020
- "Ace of Spades", a 1966 instrumental by Link Wray, released as a single on the Swan Records label
- Ace of Spades (band), a Japanese band

== Other uses ==
- Ace of Spades (comics), characters from DC Comics
- Ace of Spades (novel), 2021 novel by Faridah Àbíké-Íyímídé
- Ace of Spades (junction), a junction of the A3 road southwest of central London
- Ace of Spades (serial), a 1925 film serial
- Ace of Spades (video game), a sandbox building and FPS game
- Ace of Spades HQ, a conservative weblog
- The Ace of Spades, a 1935 British film
- Armand de Brignac or Ace of Spades, a champagne
- Ace of Spades, a non-culinary variety of the Ipomoea batatas ornamental plant
- VMA-231, US Marine Attack Squadron 231 called the "Ace of Spades"
- Saddam Hussein, the ace of spades in the Most-wanted Iraqi playing cards

== See also ==
- or
- Ace of Clubs (disambiguation)
- Ace of Diamonds (disambiguation)
- Ace of Hearts (disambiguation)
- Jack of Spades (disambiguation)
- Queen of Spades (disambiguation)
- King of Spades (disambiguation)
