= King (playing card) =

Playing card

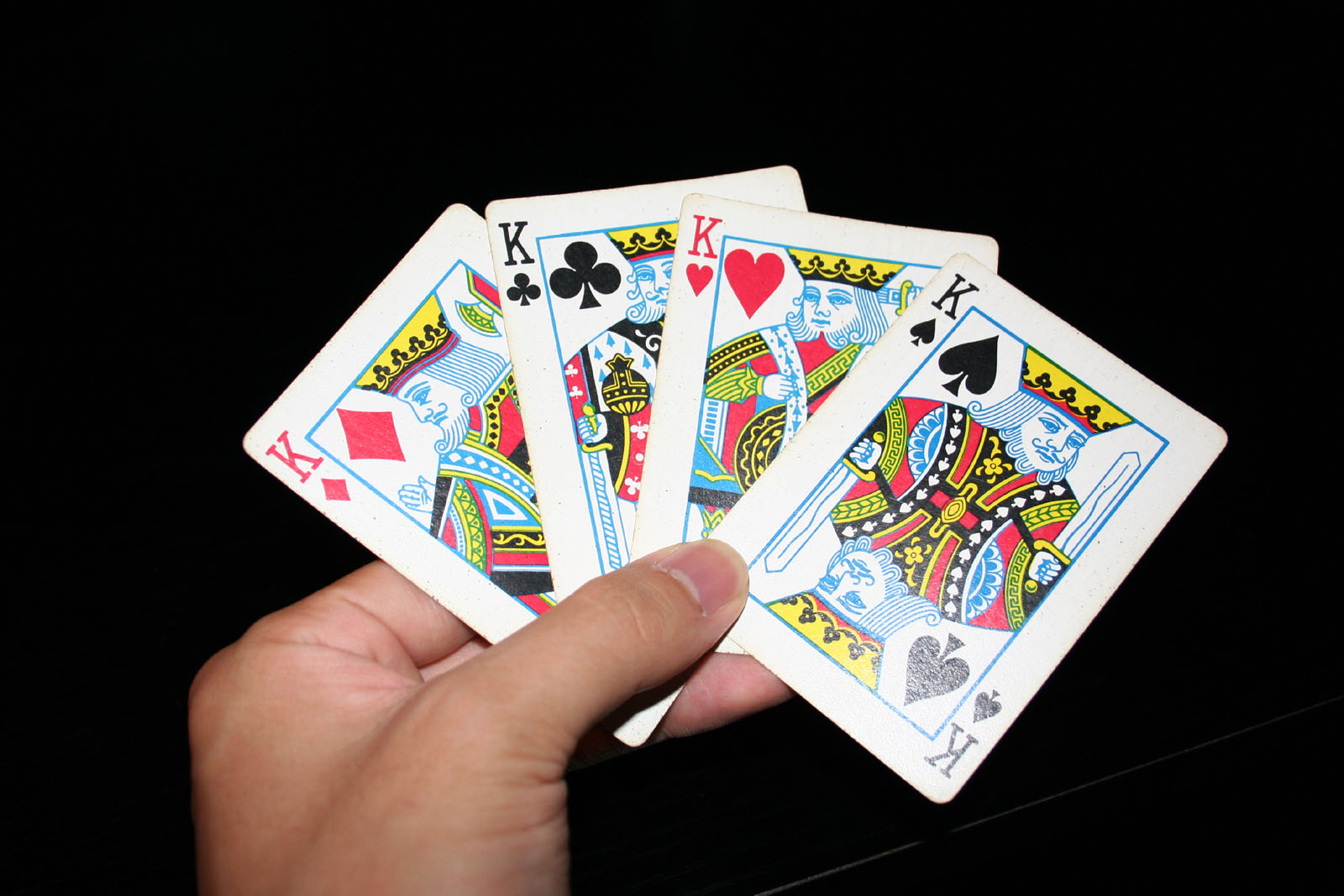
King cards of all four suits in the English pattern

The king is a playing card with a picture of a king displayed on it. The king is usually the highest-ranking face card. In the French version of playing cards and tarot decks, the king immediately outranks the queen. In Italian and Spanish playing cards, the king immediately outranks the knight. In German and Swiss playing cards, the king immediately outranks the Ober. In some games, the king is the highest-ranked card; in others, the Ace is higher. Aces began outranking kings around 1500 with Trappola being the earliest known game in which the aces were highest in all four suits. In the ace–ten family of games such as pinochle and Schnapsen, both the ace and the 10 rank higher than the king.

== History ==
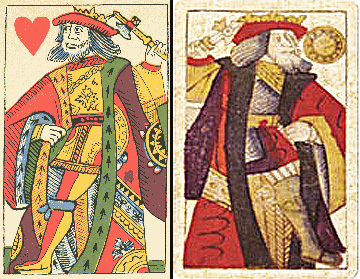
French Rouen pattern on the left, Spanish Toledo pattern on the right

The king card is the oldest and most universal court card. It most likely originated in Persian Ganjifeh where kings are depicted as seated on thrones and outranking the viceroy cards which are mounted on horses. Playing cards were transmitted to Italy and Spain via the Mamluks and Moors. The best preserved and most complete deck of Mamluk cards, the Topkapı pack, did not display human figures but just listed their rank most likely due to religious prohibition. It is not entirely sure if the Topkapı pack was representative of all Mamluk decks as it was a custom-made luxury item used for display. A fragment of what may be a seated king card was recovered in Egypt which may explain why the poses of court cards in Europe resemble those in Persia and India.

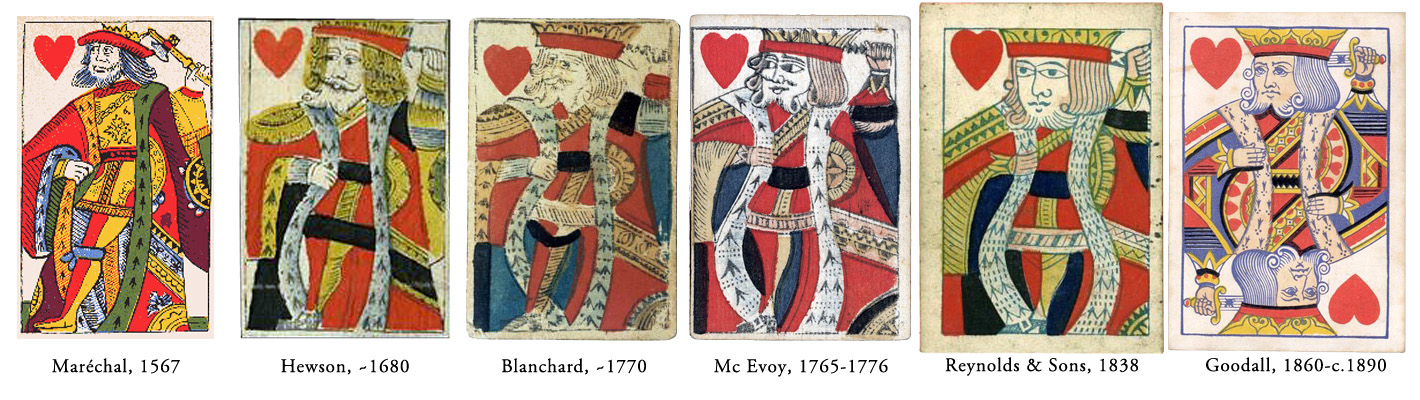
Evolution of the king of hearts from the Rouennais pattern to the English pattern

Seated kings were generally common throughout Europe. During the 15th century, the Spanish started producing standing kings. The French originally used Spanish cards before developing their regional deck patterns. Many Spanish court designs were simply reused when the French invented their own suit-system around 1480. The English imported their cards from Rouen until the early 17th century when foreign card imports were banned. The king of hearts is sometimes called the "suicide king" because he appears to be sticking his sword into his head. This is a result of centuries of bad copying by English card makers where the king's axe head has disappeared.

Starting in the 15th century, French manufacturers assigned to each of the court cards names taken from history or mythology. This practice survives only in the Paris pattern which ousted all its rivals, including the Rouen pattern around 1780. The names for the kings in the Paris pattern (portrait officiel) are:

David

Charlemagne

Julius Caesar

Alexander the Great

Most French-suited continental European patterns are descended from the Paris pattern but they have dropped the names associated with each card.

== Example cards ==
Kings from Russian playing cards:

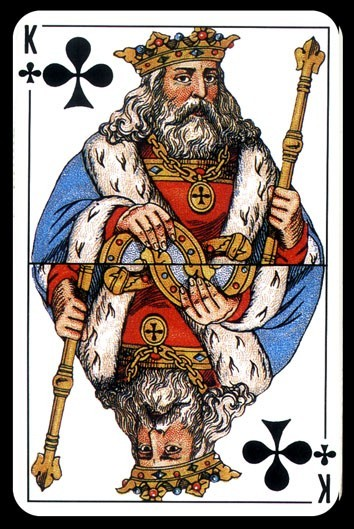
King of Clubs (Russian pattern)

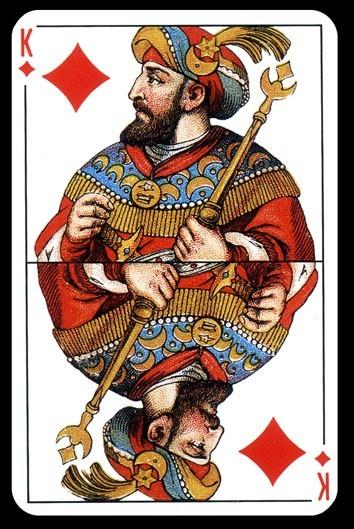
King of Diamonds (Russian pattern)

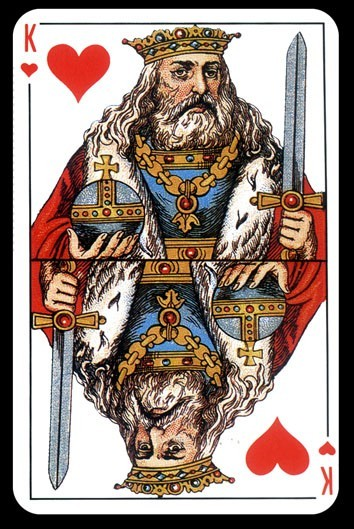
King of Hearts (Russian pattern)

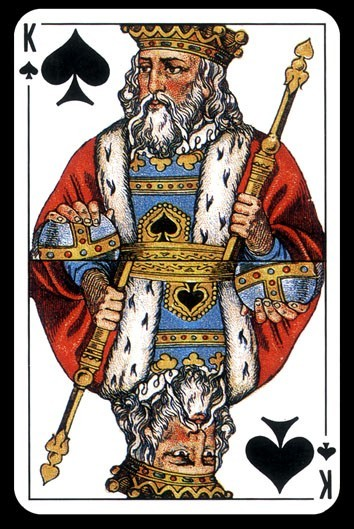
King of Spades (Russian pattern)

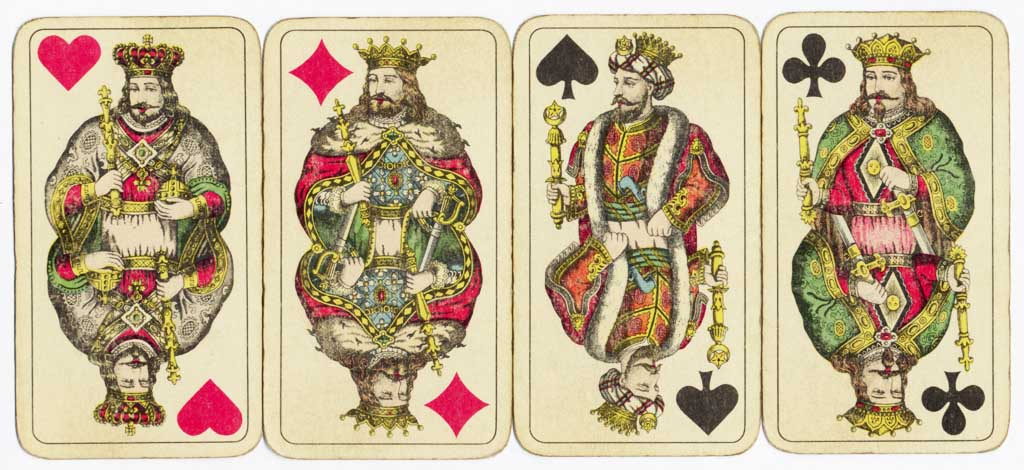
Industrie und Glück pattern

Kings from Italian playing cards:

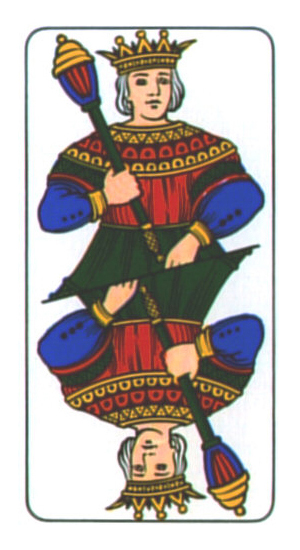
King of clubs (Bergamo pattern)

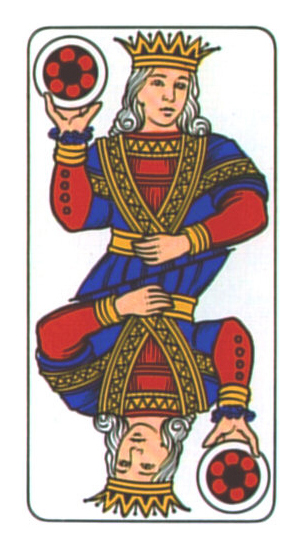
King of coins (Bergamo pattern)

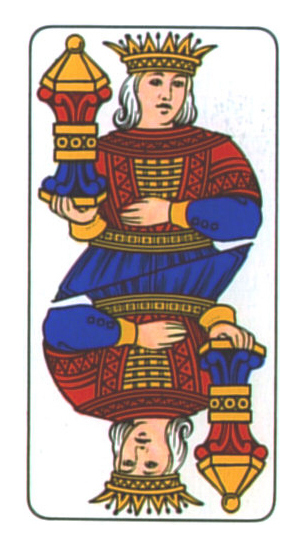
King of cups (Bergamo pattern)

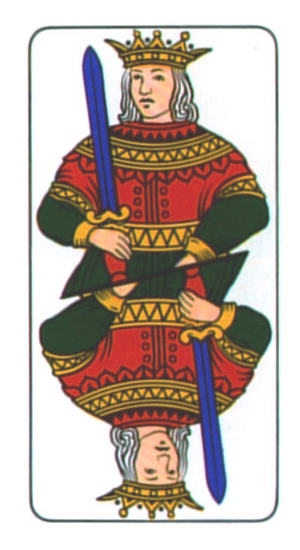
King of swords (Bergamo pattern)

Kings from Spanish playing cards:

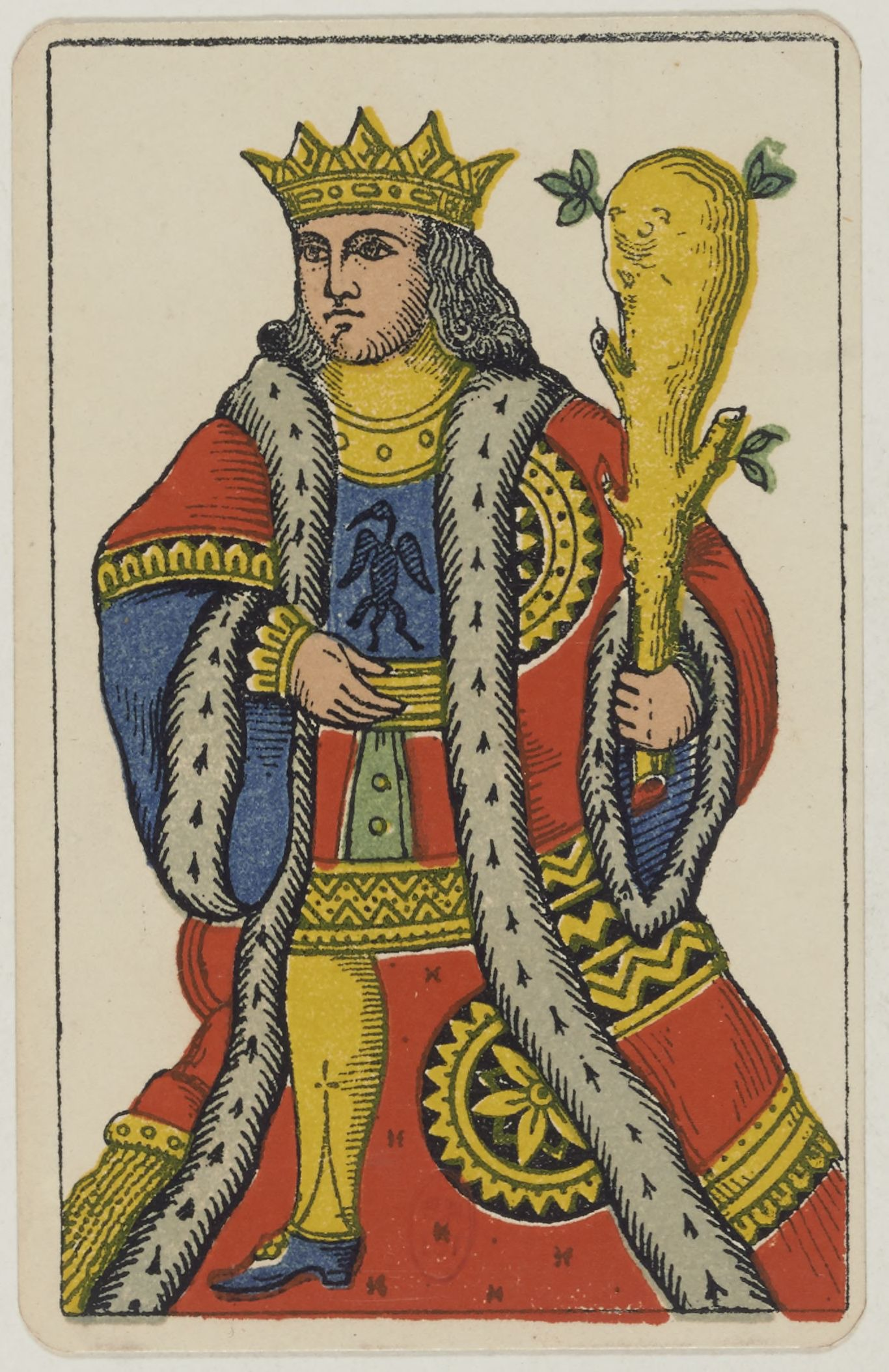
King of clubs (Aluette)

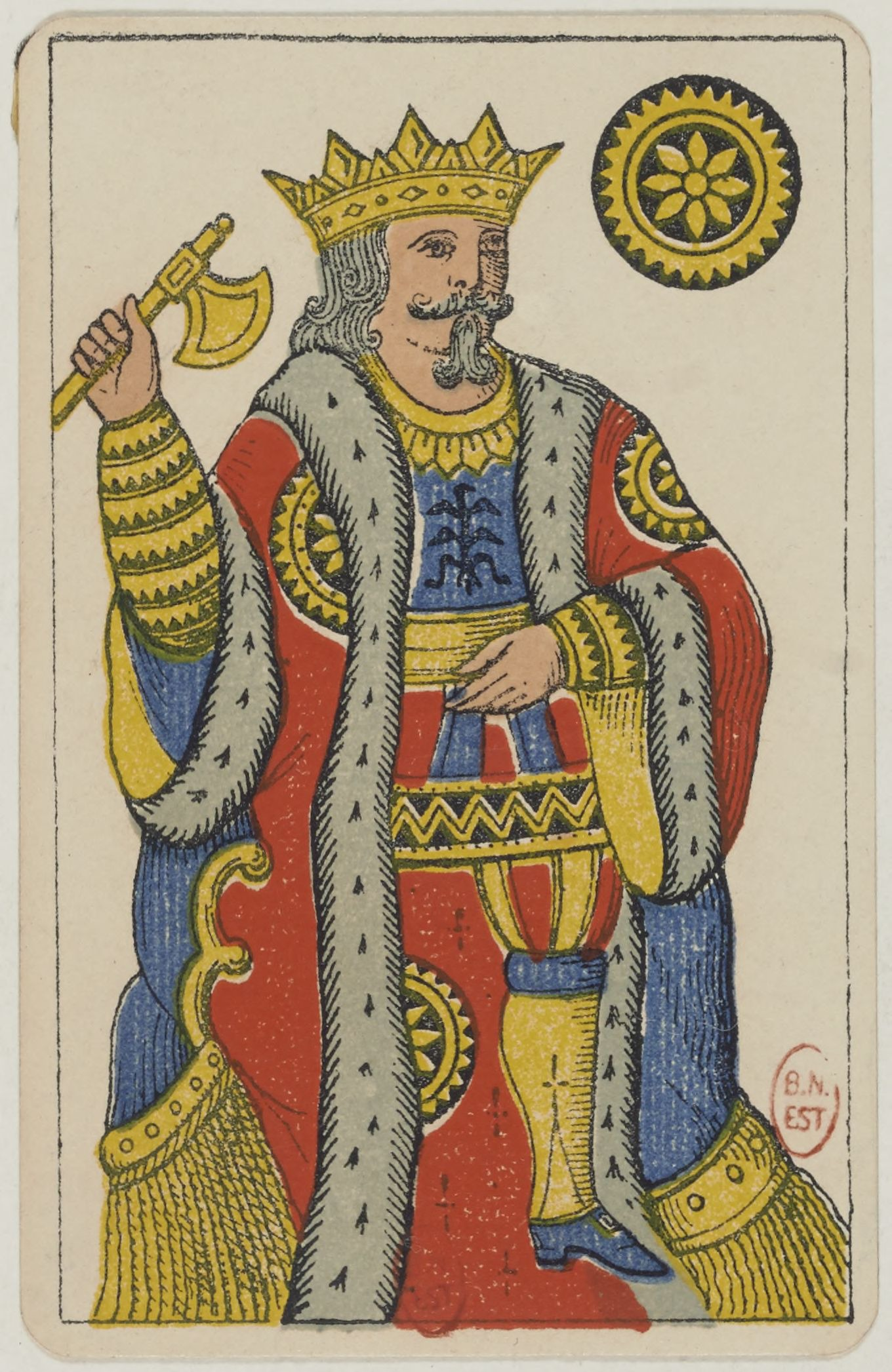
King of coins (Aluette)

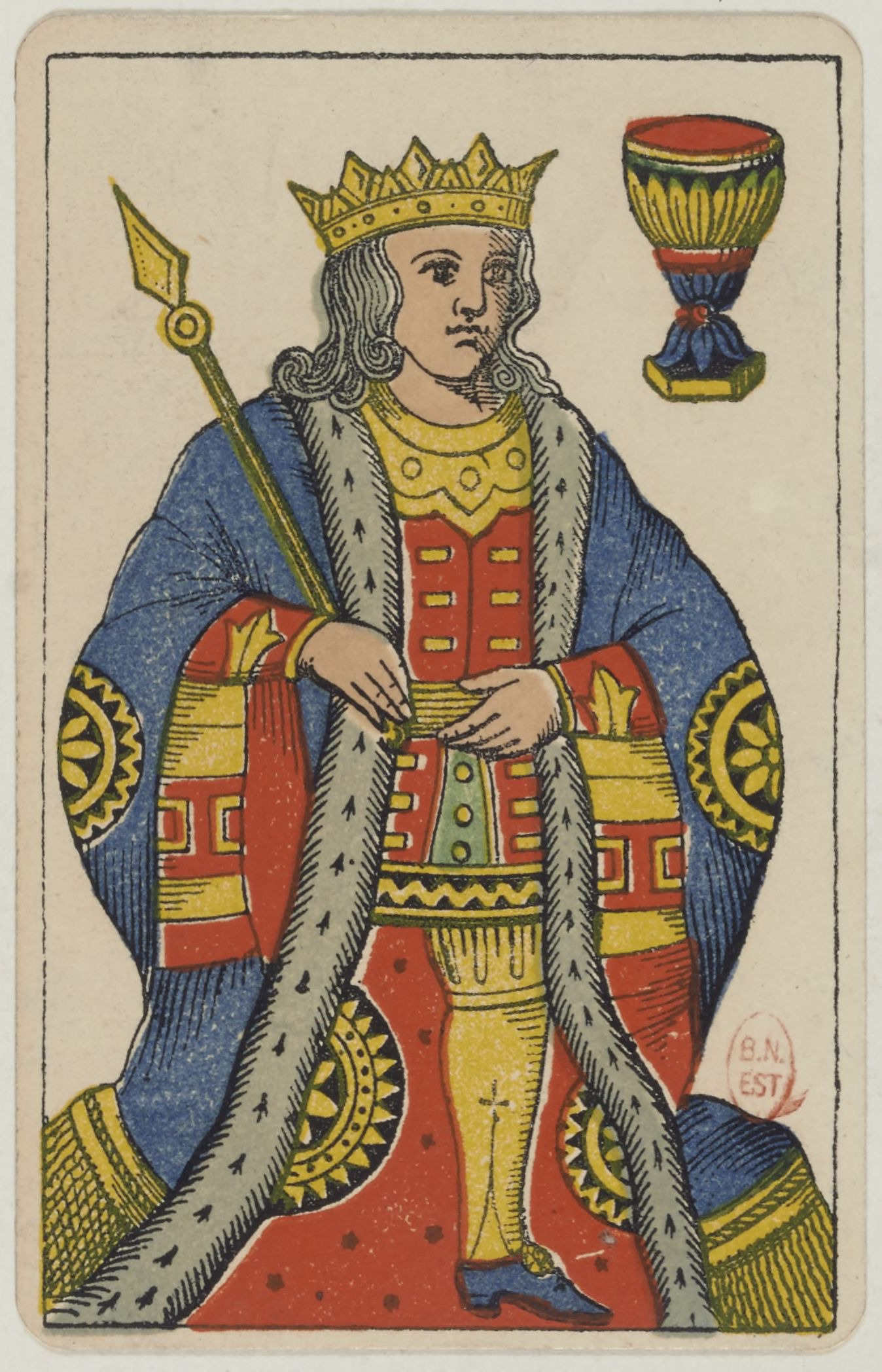
King of cups (Aluette)

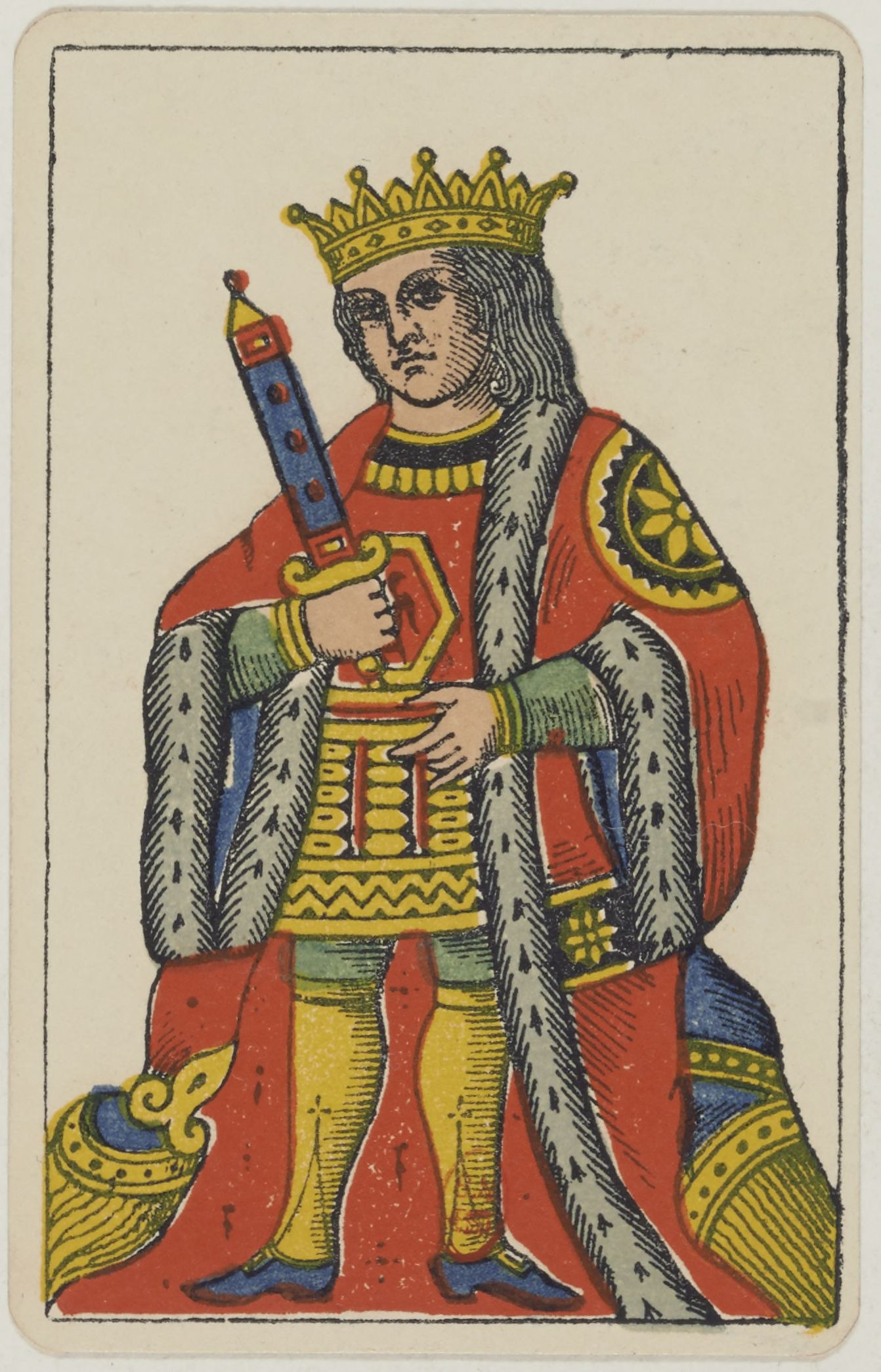
King of swords (Aluette)

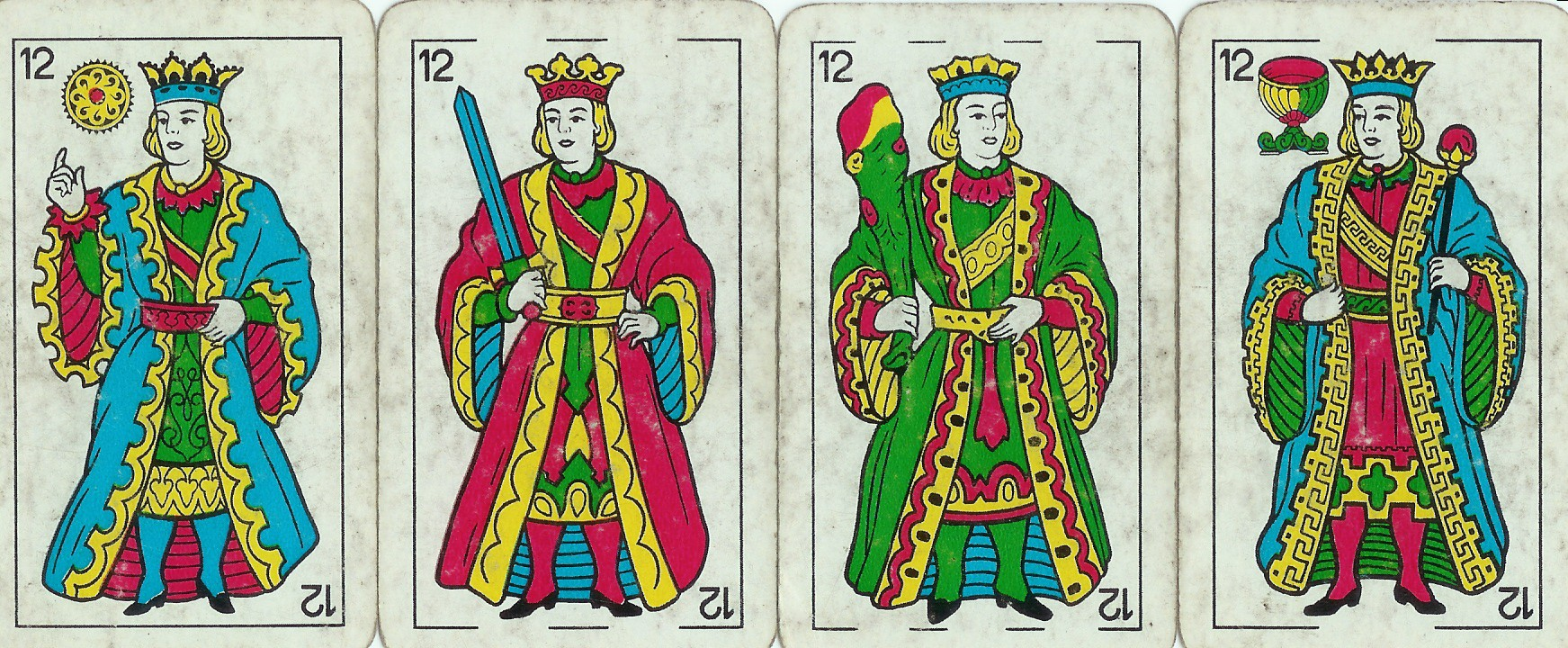
Catalan / Argentine pattern

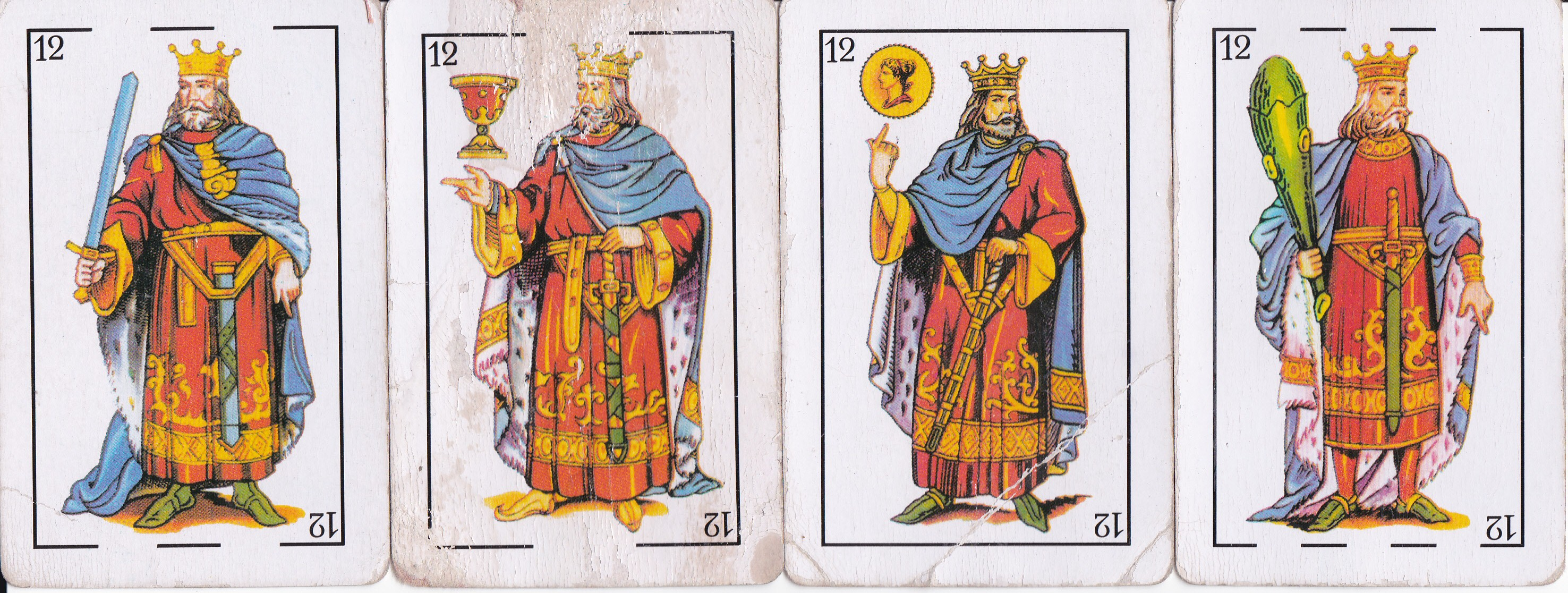
Castilian pattern

Kings from German playing cards:

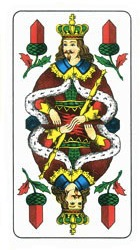
King of acorns (Saxon pattern)

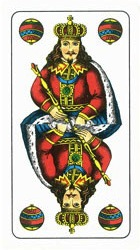
King of bells (Saxon pattern)

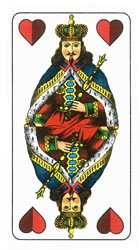
King of hearts (Saxon pattern)

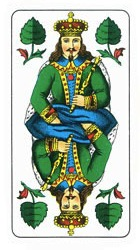
King of leaves (Saxon pattern)

== In Unicode ==
The kings are included in the Playing Cards:

- U+1F0AE 🂮 PLAYING CARD KING OF SPADES
- U+1F0BE 🂾 PLAYING CARD KING OF HEARTS
- U+1F0CE 🃎 PLAYING CARD KING OF DIAMONDS
- U+1F0DE 🃞 PLAYING CARD KING OF CLUBS

== See also ==
- List of poker hand nicknames
