= The Revells of Christendome =

Coordinates: 51°31′10.0″N 0°7′36.9″W

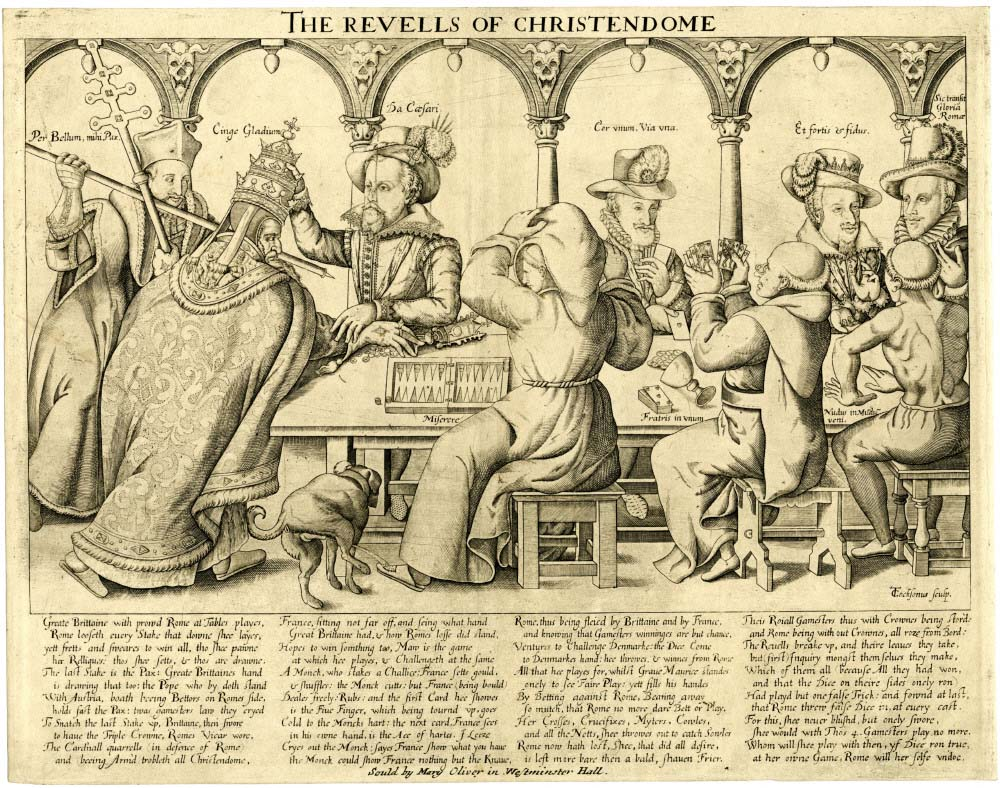
- Artist: Thomas Cockson
- Year: 1609
- Type: Engraving
- Location: London

The Revells of Christendome is an engraving by English engraver Thomas Cockson. With image size of 21.6 x 35.5 cm and overall measure of 29.2 x 37.2 cm, A copy is in the collection of the Department of Prints and Drawings of the British Museum.

== Description ==
In this satirical print, which ridicules the political condition in Europe and the efforts of England and France to negotiate cessation of hostilities between Spain and the Dutch Republic shortly after the Twelve Years' Truce, James I of England, Henri IV of France, Christian IV of Denmark and Maurice of Nassau are seen playing several gambling games such as backgammon, the card game Maw, and dice. They are accompanied by three friars and a dog which urinates on the foot of one of them, while the pope and a cleric are somewhat trying to cheat James I and his fellow European comrades.

== Original text ==
Greate Brittaine with proud Rome at Tables playes,
Rome looseth every Stake that downe shee layes,
yett fretts and sweares to win all, tho’ shee pawne
her Relliques. thos shee setts, & thos are drawne.
The last Stake is the Pax : Greate Brittaines hand
is drawing that too: the Pope who by doth stand
With Austria, boath being Bettors on Romes side,
holds fast the Pax: twas gamesters law they cryed
To Snatch the last Stake up, Brittaine, then swore
to have the Triple Crowne, Romes Vicar wore,
The Card’nall quarrells (in defence of Rome)
and (being Arm’d) trobleth all Christendome.

France, sitting not far off, and seeing what hand
Great Brittaine had, & how Romes losse did stand,
Hopes to winn something too, Maw is the game
at which hee playes, & Challengeth at the same
A Monk, who stakes a Challice : France setts gould,
& shuffles: the Monk cutts: but France (being bould)
Deales freely: Rubs : and the first card hee showes,
is the Five Finger, which being tourn’d up, goes
Cold to the Moncks hart : the next card, France sees
in his owne hand, is the Ace of hartes, "I Leeze"
Cryes out the Monck; sayes France, "Show what you have,"
the Monck could show France nothing but the Knave.

Rome, thus being fleied by Brittaine and by France,
and knowing that Gamesters winninges are but chance,
Ventures to Challenge Denmark : the Dice Come
to Denmarkes hand; hee throwes & winnes from Rome
All that he playes for; whilst Graue Maurice standes
onely to see Faire Play: yett fills his handes
By Betting against Rome, Bearing away
so mutch, that Rome no more dare Bett or Play.
Her Crosses, Crucifixes, Myters, Cowles,
and all the Netts, shee throwes out to catch Sowles
Rome now hath lost, Shee, that did all desire,
is left more bare, then a bald, shaven Frier.

Theis Roiall Gamesters thus with Crownes being stor’de
and Rome being without Crownes, all roze from Bord:
The Reuells breake up, and theire leaves they take,
but (first) Inquiry mongst themselues they make,
Which of them all, (because All they had won
and that the Dice on theire sides onely ron)
Had played but one false Trick; and found at last
that Rome threw false Dice in, at every cast,
For this, shee never blushd, but onely swore,
shee would with Thos 4 Gamesters play no more.
Whom will shee play with then, yf Dice ron true,
at her owne Game, Rome will her selfe undoe.
