= Thomas Cockson =

English engraver

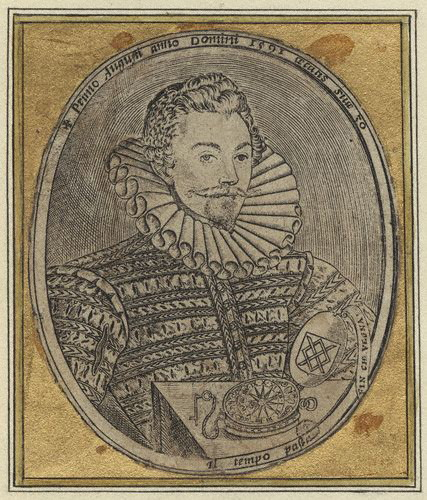
- Sir John Harington, possibly engraved by Thomas Cockson in 1591.
- Born: Thomas Cockson
- Other names: Thomas Coxson
- Occupation: Engraver
- Known for: John Harrington's translation of Ariosto's Orlando Furioso.

Thomas Cockson, or Coxon (bap. 1569 – fl. 1609-30 or 1636 – 1641), was one of the earliest English engravers. He left a large number of portraits engraved entirely with the graver in a neatly and finished manner. His first and most recognizable work is one for John Harington's version of Ariosto's Orlando Furioso and his latest, one depicting musketeers and pike men, which depicts on either side the coats of arms of various captains of the time.

== Engravings ==
Among his works are James I, sitting in parliament, Princess Elizabeth, daughter of James I, Charles I sitting in parliament, Charles Howard, Earl of Nottingham, on horseback, George Clifford, Earl of Cumberland, on horseback, Louis XIII, Marie de Médicis, Mathias I, Emperor of Germany, Demetrius, Emperor of Russia, Concini, Marquis d'Ancre (1617), Henri Bourbon, Prince de Condé, Francis White, Dean of Carlisle (1624), Samuel Daniel, the Court Poet (1609), John Taylor, the Water Poet (title-page to his poems, 1630), Thomas Coryat, and many others.

He also engraved the frontispiece to John Harington's translation of Ariosto's Orlando Furioso in 1591, a plate called The Revells of Christendome of 1609, which is a satirical print representing James I, Henry IV of France, Prince Maurice (Stadholder), and Christian IV of Denmark playing cards and backgammon against the Pope and his ecclesiastical brethren, some sea pieces with shipping, and in 1636 a large folding plate with explanatory letterpress of various postures for musketeers and pike men, invented by a certain Lieutenant Clarke.

Thomas Cockson often signed his prints with his initials interlaced; hence it is difficult to distinguish them from those of Thomas Cross or Thomas Cecil (1630), who each used a similar monogram.

== See also ==
- Intaglio
- Old master print
