= YOW (disambiguation) =

YOW is the IATA code for Ottawa Macdonald–Cartier International Airport.

Yow may also refer to:

== People with the surname ==
- Kay Yow (1942–2009), American basketball coach
- David Yow (born 1960), American vocalist and musician
- Debbie Yow (born 1950), Director of Athletics at North Carolina State University

== See also ==
- Jeme Tien Yow, Chinese railroad engineer
- Yowie (disambiguation)
