= Ian D. Clark (actor) =

British-Canadian actor

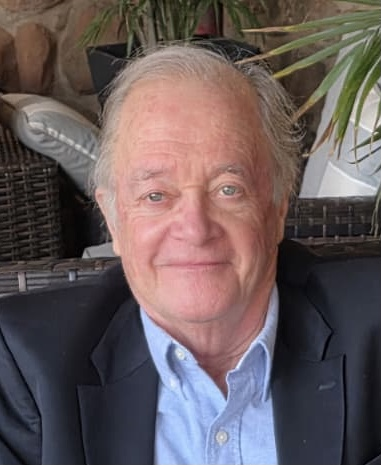
Clark in 2026

Ian Douglas Clark (born 7 April 1950) is a British-born Canadian stage and screen actor who works under the name of Ian D. Clark.

Best known for playing Simon Tremayne in the CBC Television series Road to Avonlea in the 1990s, Clark has worked mostly on stage and television, but also in films. He won a Toronto Theatre Critics Award in 2014.

== Early life ==
Clark was born in 1950 in Sheffield, Yorkshire, England, but both of his parents were Scots. His father, Dr Douglas Clark, originally from Clarkston, East Renfrewshire, was a recently-arrived general practitioner in nearby Conisbrough, while his mother, Beatrice Kenny, was a nursing sister from Dumfries. He had one younger brother, and until 1966 was educated as a boarder at Gresham's School in Norfolk, then headed by another Scot, Logie Bruce Lockhart.

In October 1966, after a farewell party, the family visited Scotland, immediately before emigrating from Conisbrough to Oshawa in Ontario, Canada, about 35 miles from downtown Toronto. Even before that, Clark had begun to think about acting as a career, after seeing the film Becket (1964), starring Richard Burton and Peter O'Toole. He continued his education at the R. S. McLaughlin Institute, Oshawa, and then at McGill University, Montreal, where he took a bachelor's degree in English and French and an MA in English literature, intended as a first step towards an academic career. While there, with Fiona Reid and Guy Sprung he acted on stage with a student troupe called Theatre Encounter in Montreal. His MA thesis was deferred for several years, while his acting career began to take off, but it was eventually completed.

In 1977, Clark was given a very small part in Peter Shaffer's film Equus, but he was also hired as stand-in to Richard Burton, taking his place during set-ups. He spent every day for six weeks in studios at Kleinburg, with Sidney Lumet directing a cast which included Burton, Joan Plowright, Peter Firth, Harry Andrews, and Jenny Agutter. Clark has said of this "Acting schools weren’t common then, and I had no formal acting training. I learned on the job, by doing, by watching people who were better than me. And those six weeks on Equus were like a master class with the masters – Burton and Lumet."

== Stage ==
Clark's early stage career was with the Shaw Festival repertory company, in Niagara-on-the-Lake. In 1982, he played Antipholus of Ephesis in A Comedy of Errors at the Citadel Theatre, Edmonton. In 1986, he had the title role in Larry Shue's play The Foreigner at the Royal Alexandra Theatre, Toronto. At the Shaw Festival of 1988, he was noticed in The Voysey Inheritance.

Clark has appeared many times at the Walnut Street Theatre, Philadelphia. In 2001, he was there playing Inspector Rough in Gaslight. In 2003, he was back at the theatre as Peacey in The Voysey Inheritance, and in 2004 played Sandy Lord in The Philadelphia Story. In 2005, he was there again to star as Finian in a production of the musical Finian's Rainbow. In 2007, he played Frederick Arnott, a comic turn, in Enchanted April, and in 2011 was back as Baron von Swieten in Peter Shaffer's Amadeus. In 2013 he played the Earl of Caversham in a Walnut Street production of Oscar Wilde's An Ideal Husband.

In 2006, at the Tarragon Theatre, Toronto, Clark appeared as Jim the Gardener in Charlotte Jones's Humble Boy. In 2008 and 2009, he played David Manning and other parts in David Hare’s Stuff Happens at the Royal Alexandra Theatre, Toronto. From April to October, 2011, at the Stratford Festival in Stratford, Ontario, he played Grampa Joad in The Grapes of Wrath and was also understudy for the part of Sam in Harold Pinter's The Homecoming.

In 2014, Clark was on stage as both butlers in a Thousand Islands Playhouse revival of The Importance of Being Earnest, with one review calling him "the cast stand-out". Also in 2014, after he had appeared as F in the first Canadian production of Mike Bartlett's play Cock, at the Theatre Centre, Toronto, the part won him the Toronto Theatre Critics Award for Best Supporting Actor in a Play. In 2015, he played the title role in Tuesdays with Morrie at the Thousand Islands Playhouse. In October of the same year, he stepped in at short notice to replace Jamie Farr in Jack of Diamonds at Theatre Aquarius, in Hamilton, Ontario, after Farr had collapsed during a rehearsal. A review noted that the director "had the irrepressible Ian D. Clark waiting in the wings, ready to unleash his own brand of hokum."

In 2020, Clark was at the Ed Mirvish Theatre, Toronto, appearing in Jack Thorne's Harry Potter and the Cursed Child.

== Screen ==
An early television role for Clark came in The Newcomers: 1847, filmed in 1977.

After performing many parts in television movies and shows, from 1993 to 1996 Clark appeared as a leading character in Road to Avonlea , playing Simon Tremayne, the disinherited son of a British duke and the owner of the White Sands Hotel. The location for this was Dalvay-by-the-Sea, and by chance Clark and his family had taken a holiday at the real hotel before emigrating to Canada. After that, Clark had lead roles on other television shows, The Arrow (1997), Little Men (1998), and The Associates (2001).

In the vampire web series Carmilla, Clark plays Baron von Vordenberg.

In 2024, Clark appeared in The Apprentice, a biopic film of the early career of Donald Trump, playing Mayor Ed Koch.

== Films ==
- Equus (1977), uncredited
- Murder by Phone (1982) as First Cop
- The Boy in Blue (1986) as Aussie
- A Nest of Singing Birds (1988), as David Gore
- Last Wish (1992) as Dr Kevin Burns
- Treacherous Beauties (1994) as Barry
- Thirty Two Short Films About Glenn Gould (1993) as Phillip Brennan
- Bach's Fight for Freedom (1995) as Josef Muller
- The Michelle Apartments (1995), as Abernathy
- Lilies (1996) as Father Saint Michel, prison chaplain
- That Old Feeling (1997), as Rufus
- The Wishing Tree (1999) as Davies
- The Hunt for the Unicorn Killer (1999) as Denis Weaire
- The Chippendales Murder (2000) as Russell Liggott–Jones
- Cruel Intentions 2 (2000) as Principal Ed Freeman
- Laughter on the 23rd Floor (2001) as Max's doctor
- The Piano Man's Daughter (2003) as Coroner's Counsel
- The Reagans (2003) as Dr. John E. Hutton Jr.
- Black Widow (2005) as Minister
- Maneater (2007) as Colonel James Livingston Graham
- Georgetown (2019) as Carl Mattingly
- The Apprentice (2024) as Ed Koch

== Personal life ==
Clark met his future wife, Beverly, at the R. S. McLaughlin school in Oshawa, and from there they both went on to McGill University. They were married in 1984 and since then have lived in Kingston, Ontario, where Mrs Clark was a teacher. This is about a three-hour drive from Toronto, which is the main centre for Canadian theatres and auditions. They have one daughter.

Clark's father died in Oshawa in December 1999, aged 78, and his funeral was at St. George's. His mother died in April 2012, aged 89.
