= Tim the Yowie Man =

Australian writer, author and cryptonaturalist

- Born: Timothy Bull; Australia
- Occupation: Cryptonaturalist
- Children: 2 daughters
- Website: Yowieman.com; Tim the Yowie Man on Twitter

Tim the Yowie Man is an Australian writer, author and cryptonaturalist who was born in Canberra, Australian Capital Territory.

== Life and career ==
Born Timothy Bull, TYM has changed his name by deed poll. He is an Australian National University graduate.

Tim the Yowie Man claims to have seen a yowie, an entity from Australian folklore that supposedly resides in the nation’s outback. He saw it while bushwalking at Mount Franklin in the Brindabella National Park in 1994. Since then, Tim the Yowie Man has investigated yowie sightings and other paranormal phenomena across Australia and internationally. He also writes regular columns various newspapers including The Canberra Times and The Sydney Morning Herald.

In 2004, Tim the Yowie Man won a legal case against Cadbury, a popular British confectionery company. Cadbury had claimed that his moniker was too similar to their range of Yowie confectionery. In deciding the case, a Trade Mark Oppositions Hearing Officer ruled that she was "satisfied that a substantial portion of the Australian public would know of the dictionary meaning of yowie and be able to distinguish between use of the term in this sense, and use of the term by (Cadbury)."

In 2012, artist Barbara van der Linden painted Tim's portrait as part of her Faces of Canberra series, for exhibition during Canberra's centenary year in 2013. He continues to live in Canberra with his family.

He has acted as a location and historical advisor for international television programs on unusual phenomena and has featured in documentaries about Australian and international mysteries. He was even an informant for foreign press when Survivor was filming in the Australian outback. He is a member of the Australian Society of Travel Writers, and has hosted a national travel radio show and is a ghost-tour guide. He also has his own YouTube channel that covers mysteries, cryptids, and urban legends.

== Publications ==
- Haunted and Mysterious Australia - Bunyips, yowies, phantoms and other strange phenomena, New Holland, 2006, ISBN 978-1741108279
- The Adventures of Tim the Yowie Man, cryptonaturalist, Sydney: Random House Australia, 2001, ISBN 174051078X
- It's Alive!, Canberra: National Museum of Australia, 2003, ISBN 187694422-6 (Contributed to.)
- In the Spirit of Banjo, Canberra: Pendragon Publishing and Design Australia, 2014, ISBN 978-0-9925061-2-4

== Short films / documentaries ==
- The Roaring Bunyip with Tim the Yowie man. (Documentary. Carillion Pictures 2013)
- TYM The Series - Haunted Tales of Burnima Homestead. (Documentary. Austography 2017)
- TYM The Series - The Mysteries of Lake George. (Documentary. Austography 2017)
- TYM The Series - The Great Aussie Pie Challenge. (Documentary. Austography 2017)
