= Three Fires =

Three Fires may refer to:

- Three fires (Buddhism), the three primary causes of unskillful action in Buddhism

== See also ==
- Council of Three Fires, a long-standing Anishinaabe alliance of the Ojibwe, Ottawa, and Potawatomi North American Native tribes
- Three Fires Council, Boy Scouts of America, St. Charles Illinois
- Three Fires District, part of the Southern Shores Field Service Council of the Boy Scouts of America
- Two Fires
- Four Fires
- Seven fires
