= Mortein =

Australian pesticide brand

- Type: Insecticide
- Industry: Household goods
- Founder: J. Hagemann
- Headquarters: Sydney, Australia
- Area served: Australia, New Zealand, South Africa, Fiji, Bangladesh, India, Pakistan, Sri Lanka, Philippines, Morocco, Algeria, Tunisia, Kenya, Libya, Egypt, Mauritania and Papua New Guinea
- Products: Insecticides, mosquito repellents, fly sprays
- Owner: Reckitt

Mortein is an Australian brand of household insecticide owned by the British company Reckitt. Together with its sister product Aerogard, a popular insect repellent, Mortein is widely used in Australia and is marketed internationally. It is also available in New Zealand, India, Pakistan, Fiji, and the Comoros. The brand has been represented in television commercials by cartoon villain Louie the Fly.

In 1969, the Samuel Taylor company was bought by the British company Reckitt & Colman.

== Creation ==
Mortein was made its first appearance as an insecticidal powder in the 1870s by J. Hagemann, a German immigrant to Australia. It is believed that Hagemann himself came up with the name Mortein, with a little help from his French wife. The word "Mortein" is a combination of the French word "mort" (dead) and the German word "ein" (one).

Hagemann used crushed chrysanthemum flowers to produce a pyrethrum extract powder. In the 1920s a squeeze puffer was developed. Hagemann introduced a liquid version in 1928, combining this with kerosene and had a flit gun designed which allowed the insecticide to be sprayed into the air or onto the pests themselves.

== Slogan ==
Mortein's slogan is "More smart, more safe, Mortein". The brand's previous long time slogan and logo was "When you're on a good thing stick to it", accompanied by an illustration of a running dog with an insect attached to the tip of its tail.

== Formula ==
Mortein "Insect Seeking Fly Spray" uses the active ingredients allethrin (2.09 g/kg) and resmethrin (0.39 g/kg), both pyrethroid neuro-toxins. One study found an association between exposure to pyrethroids and attention-deficit/hyperactivity disorder (ADHD) in male, but not female, children. Another study found an association between exposure to pyrethroids and the prevalence of biochemical markers for ADHD in developing mice. There is evidence that continuous exposure to pyrethroid-based mosquito repellents can lead to adverse health effects. Studies have shown significant increase in the levels of plasma glucose, phospholipids, nitrite and nitrate, and lipidperoxides with a decrease in plasma cholesterol. It is also shown that inhaling d-trans-allethrin can irritate the nose, throat and lungs. High exposure may cause headache, dizziness, irritability, seizures, and a loss of consciousness. Exposure may also cause a skin allergy or asthma-like allergy, and damage the liver and kidneys.

Pyrethroids break down in the environment after one or two days.

== Louie the Fly ==
The company is well known for its popular animated villainous mascot "Louie the Fly", who has been drawn and animated by Geoffry Morgan Pike since 1957. The concept was the brainchild of the late author Bryce Courtenay. Paired with a jingle created by James Joseph ("Jimmy") White and used in animated TV commercials since 1962, he proudly sings of his own dirtiness, claiming to be afraid of no-one except "the man with the can of Mortein". The character and ditty was sung by Sydney singer Neil Williams, and later actor and comedian Ross Higgins, best known as Ted Bullpitt in Kingswood Country, and voice actor Lee Perry.

The music and lyrics for the jingle were written by James Joseph White and the copyright of the music and lyrics was held by him until his death. The copyright then was inherited by his relatives. The copyright of the jingle is registered with the Australasian Performing Right Association.

In 2017, the National Film and Sound Archive added the Louie the Fly Mortein jingle to the Sounds of Australia register for songs of "cultural, historical and aesthetic significance and relevance".
