= Yowie (disambiguation) =

The Yowie is a creature from Australian folklore.

Yowie may also refer to:

- Yowie (band), experimental math rock trio from St. Louis, Missouri
- Yowie (chocolate), confectionery from the Cadbury-Schweppes company

== See also ==
- Yowie Bay, New South Wales, a suburb of Sydney, Australia
- Yaoi, a form of slash fiction
