= Roy Kyle =

Roy Kyle (1897–1996) was an Australian soldier who fought in World War I. He is known for his diary of his war experiences that was edited by the noted novelist Bryce Courtenay and subsequently published.

Kyle was born on 9 November 1897 in Corowa, New South Wales, Australia and died in October 1996. He fought in both Gallipoli and on the Western Front. At age 92, he returned to Gallipoli in 1990 for the 75th anniversary of the ANZAC landings. He died six years later.
