= April Fool's Day (novel) =

1993 novel by Bryce Courtenay

- First edition
- Author: Bryce Courtenay
- Language: English
- Publisher: Random House Australia
- Publication date: 1993
- Publication place: Australia
- Media type: Print (Hardback & Paperback)
- Preceded by: Tandia
- Followed by: Recipe for Dreaming

April Fool's Day is a 1993 book by Australian author Bryce Courtenay. The book is a biography of and tribute to the author's son, Damon Courtenay, a haemophiliac who contracted HIV/AIDS through an infected blood transfusion. The title refers to the date of Damon's death, 1 April 1991 (April Fools' Day).

Damon was a classic haemophiliac all his life. He attempted to write this book himself but did not have much success. On his death bed, he asked his father to write it for him. Damon talked a lot about love; he believed it was important that everybody knew how to love. Evidence of this is his attitude towards people who treated people with AIDS unfairly. Not much was known about AIDS back then and those affected were stigmatized.

== Sources ==
- Official website
