= The Power of One (novel) =

1989 novel by Bryce Courtenay

- First Edition (Australia)
- Author: Bryce Courtenay
- Language: English
- Genre: Bildungsroman, Historical novel
- Publisher: Heinemann (Australia); Random House (US)
- Publication date: 21 February 1989
- Publication place: Australia
- Media type: Print (Hardback & Paperback)
- Pages: 576 pp (UK hardback edition) & 518 pp (US paperback edition)
- ISBN: 0-434-14612-9 (UK hardback edition), ISBN 0-345-35992-5 (US paperback edition) & ISBN 0-14-130489-8 (children's adaptation)
- OCLC: 59213894
- Followed by: Tandia

The Power of One is a novel by South African born, Australian author Bryce Courtenay, first published in 1989. Set in the Union of South Africa during the 1930s and 1940s, it tells the story of an Anglo-South African boy, who through the course of the story, acquires the name of Peekay. In the film version, the protagonist's given name is Peter Phillip Kenneth Keith. The author identifies "Peekay" as a reference to his earlier nickname "Piskop": Afrikaans for "Pisshead."

It is written from the first person perspective, with Peekay narrating (as an adult, looking back) and trusting the reader with his thoughts and feelings, as opposed to a detailed description of places and account of actions.

A film adaptation was released in 1992.

== Plot summary ==
The Power of One follows an English-speaking South African boy named Peekay from 1939 to 1951. The story begins when Peekay's mother has a nervous breakdown, and Peekay ends up being raised by a Zulu wet nurse, Mary Mandoma, who eventually becomes his nanny. At a young age, Peekay is sent to a boarding school. As the youngest student attending the school, he is frequently harassed. The students call him Piskop (meaning piss-head) and rooinek (redneck—a name given to the British soldiers during the Second Boer War as a result of the helmets and short hair cuts leaving their necks exposed, resulting in severe sunburn) among other names. This continues with an older boy, the Judge, and his partners who further punish him for his frequent bedwetting with verbal and physical abuse. The Judge is a Nazi sympathizer, and he has a hatred for the British, proclaiming that Hitler will march the British out to sea. The Afrikaans woman who runs the boarding school does not console him and walks around threateningly with a whip.

When Peekay returns home after his first year at the boarding school, his nanny calls a medicine man called Inkosi-Inkosikazi to cure his bedwetting. Inkosi-Inkosikazi not only succeeds, but also leads Peekay's mind to a place where there are three waterfalls and ten stepping stones, where Peekay can always "find" him. The next school year, Peekay returns with a magic chicken of Inkosi-Inkosikazi's and a different paradigm, called "the power of one". Peekay is excellent in his studies, but maintains a camouflage to hide it from his fellow students and teachers. He finds that this is a good way to beat the system and avoid unnecessary abuse. As the punishments from the Judge continue to get worse, Peekay ends up doing the Judge's math homework. At the end of the year, the Judge forces Peekay to eat feces, and kills his beloved chicken. He looks forward to arriving home to his nanny, but has been informed there has been a change in plans. He will be travelling to a town called Barberton, where he will meet his grandfather.

On the train ride to Barberton, Peekay meets Hoppie Groenewald, who shows Peekay his boxing gloves. Hoppie is a boxing champion, and he invites Peekay to watch him box during a stop in the ride. It is there that Peekay is inspired to be the welterweight champion of the world. Hoppie teaches Peekay the phrase "First with your head, then with the heart," a phrase which Peekay commits to memory. At Barberton, Peekay sees his mother again. She has returned from the mental institution and converted to being a born again Christian. He learns that his mother had left his nanny because she refused to convert. His mother also tries to convert him, but he tells his mother that the Lord is a "shithead." Retreating to the hills behind his home, Peekay meets a German professor, Karl von Vollensteen, whom Peekay calls "Doc." Doc is a music professor and botanist who collects cacti and has his own cactus garden. Doc and Peekay become close friends, and he offers Peekay piano lessons. When World War II breaks out, Doc is taken into the Barberton prison for being an unregistered alien. Peekay visits him every day for piano lessons, and attends the prison's boxing squad. A prisoner with whom Peekay becomes friends, Geel Piet, teaches him to box, and Peekay leads the team to a victory. Later, Peekay develops great sympathy for the prisoners and arranges Doc and Geel Piet a letter-writing service and a tobacco distribution service. This makes Peekay very famous among the prisoners, and they call him the great chief "Tadpole Angel" (a reference to Doc being the "Frog" for his nightly piano playing). One of the warders discovers that some suspicious activity has been going on, and one night, Geel Piet is murdered in the gym.

The war ends, and Doc finds himself free again. Ms. Boxhall, the local librarian, and a Jewish schoolteacher, Miss Bornstein, work with Doc to further encourage the blossoming of Peekay's intellect with activities such as science, literature and chess. He passes his Royal College of Music exams and earns the title of best under-twelve boxer in the region. With the help of his guides, Peekay is accepted into the prestigious Prince of Wales school in Johannesburg.

At the Prince of Wales, Peekay partners with the son of a Jewish millionaire, Hymie (Morrie in American versions) Levy. They pull off many "scams" to earn money and Peekay joins the school's failing boxing team. Hymie becomes Peekay's manager and they pull off the school's first win in many years. Peekay starts boxing lessons with South Africa's famous Solly Goldman. He then faces Gideon Mandoma, the son of his beloved Nanny, and defeats him, cementing the title of "great chief". Peekay grows to be a stranger to failure, excelling at academics, boxing and rugby. Near the end of his last year of school, he must face the death of Doc and not earning a Rhodes scholarship, therefore missing his chance to join Hymie at Oxford to study law.

As a result, Peekay takes a year off of boxing and academics and goes to work in Northern Rhodesia's copper mines to "find himself" and build up the muscle to become a welterweight. He takes on the dangerous work of a "grizzly man" as required by all new miners, but continues on to earn double wages, thereby saving enough to attend Oxford. At the mines, he meets a Georgian called Rasputin and they become close friends. When Peekay has an accident in his shaft, Rasputin saves Peekay, but gives his own life up instead. Rasputin names Peekay as his beneficiary; that and his own insurance payout gives him enough to be able to attend Oxford. One night before Peekay leaves the mining camp, Peekay meets his old nemesis, the Judge, in a bar at the mines. The Judge is in an insane rage due to handling mine explosives and tries to kill Peekay. A fight ensues and Peekay puts all he has learned in his life to destroy the Judge. After defeating the Judge, Peekay carves a Union Jack and the initials "PK" over the Swastika on the Judge's arm. He then walks into the night.

== Reception ==
The Power of One is Bryce Courtenay's best-known book. It has been translated into 18 languages, has sold more than 8 million copies, and has been made into a Hollywood film.

Reviewing the novel for The Sydney Morning Herald Peter Pierce noted that, for all its faults, the novel is "improbably likeable", allowing "readers to ignore carping highbrows and immerse themselves in a yarn much of which its author has lived and dreamed."

In The Age newspaper David Owen called the book "formula fiction with the extra dimension of real-life racism and brutality."

== Notes ==
- Dedication: For Maude Jasmine Greer and Enda Murphy. Here is the book I promised you so long ago.
- Selected in December 2004 by the Australian public in an ABC poll as Australia's joint 36th favourite book.
- The novel ranked #5 in ABC1's First Tuesday Book Club '10 Aussie Books to Read Before You Die' 2012 voting ballot
- In a May 2010 episode of ABC TV's The Book Club Bryce Courtenay discussed the novel with the show's host Jennifer Byrne
