= Sylvia (novel) =

Novel by Bryce Courtenay

- First edition
- Author: Bryce Courtenay
- Language: English
- Genre: Historical novel
- Publisher: Viking Press
- Publication date: 16 November 2006
- Publication place: Australia
- Media type: Print (Hardback)
- Pages: 503 pp
- ISBN: 0-670-07026-2
- OCLC: 86110767
- Dewey Decimal: 823/.914 22
- LC Class: PR9619.3.C5964 S95 2006

Sylvia is a 2006 novel by Australian author Bryce Courtenay.

== Synopsis ==
It is written as the memoir of a teenage girl, Sylvia Honeyeater, during the Children's Crusade of the 13th century. She encounters several historical figures such as the Pied Piper of Hamelin and Francis of Assisi. It explores themes of religious intolerance, womanhood, abuse and childhood.

== Critical reception ==
Sophie Masson, writing in the Sydney Morning Herald was not impressed with the novel: "Courtenay is clearly fascinated by the swirl of the Middle Ages. But he cannot resist the preacherly tone, in which awkward dialogue imparts too much instruction. This may be exactly what his many readers seek – to be educated as well as entertained. But for this reader, the action and interest of the novel was soon buried under a weight of preaching."
