= Throwback (2014 film) =

Australian horror film by Travis Bain

- Film poster
- Directed by: Travis Bain
- Written by: Travis Bain
- Produced by: Travis Bain
- Starring: Shawn Brack; Anthony Ring
- Music by: Richard Band; Amotz Plessner
- Production company: Sapphire Pictures
- Release date: 2014
- Country: Australia
- Budget: $4,000

Throwback (Das Biest lebt! in Germany) is a 2014 Australian independent horror film directed by Travis Bain. The film centres on two would-be treasure hunters in search of an outlaw's fabled hoard in remote Australia and their subsequent encounter with a yowie.

== Plot ==
The film opens in 1825 in "north eastern Australia," with a lone Chinese man panning for gold by a river. Almost immediately after finding a sizable nugget, he is robbed at gunpoint by an unnamed man who subsequently flees into the bush. Shortly after, the unnamed man is himself held at gunpoint by legendary outlaw "Thunderclap" Newman, who claims the nugget. However, their exchange is cut short by the screams of the Chinese man (who is killed offscreen) followed by inhuman roars. Newman shoots the unnamed man in the leg to incapacitate him, intending to distract the approaching threat while he escapes. The creature—a large, hairy, ape-like animal—quickly kills the unnamed man and then chases down and kills Newman.

In the present day, two exterminators-cum-treasure-hunters, Jack and Kent, paddle up the same river from the film's opening, intending to find Newman's gold. They enter the bush, camp for the night, and, the next day, navigate via GPS to a system of lava tubes, where they quickly find Newman's gold. Upon returning to their kayak with the gold in a bag, Kent attempts to murder Jack but is distracted by movement on the far riverbank. Thinking this to be a potential witness, Kent goes after the individual and leaves both Jack's body and the gold.

Meanwhile, park ranger Rhiannon spots the smoke from Jack and Kent's campfire from the previous night and investigates. She soon encounters Jack, who had merely blacked out during Kent's attack and now has the bag of gold. Spotting Kent, Jack hides the bag of gold in the river and urges Rhiannon to call the police. Kent spots them before Rhiannon can radio for assistance and holds them at gunpoint, ordering Rhiannon to throw her radio into the river and threatening to kill them both unless Jack reveals where he hid the gold. Jack lies as to the location of the gold and proceeds to lead Kent on a trek through the bush, during which the three come across a makeshift sleeping area and a large footprint. Kent dismisses this but, when distracted by the creature's roar, is overpowered by Jack, who steals his gun and flees with Rhiannon. Kent is left to face the creature but manages to shelter in a hollowed-out tree truck too small for the creature to enter and scares the creature off by stabbing its hand with a pocketknife. While running from the creature, Jack and Rhiannon discover that it will not cross water.

Upon returning to the river, Kent is confronted by a man in a ghillie suit, Detective McNab (played by Vernon Wells), who is investigating the series of disappearances in the area and suspects it to be the work of a serial killer. McNab is unconvinced by Kent's explanations as to why he is in the remote area and, noting Kent's blood-covered pocketknife, handcuffs him to a large tree root. Kent then tries to claim the presence of an "evolutionary throwback ... a yowie," which McNab ignores. However, while attempting to phone the local police station, McNab (who is revealed to be on suspension) spots the yowie. McNab's phone rings while he is attempting to take a photograph of the yowie, which then brutally dismembers him. Kent resorts to breaking his hand with a rock in order to escape the handcuffs.

While Rhiannon is asleep, Jack attempts to recover the gold and is confronted by Kent on one side of the river (wielding the deceased McNab's gun) and the yowie on the other. Kent, satisfied that the yowie has killed Jack, chases down Rhiannon, shoots her through the leg and uses her as bait to lure the yowie into an ambush. The yowie, having impaled Jack through the leg but stopped short of killing him, flees with Rhiannon back to its lair while Kent is distracted by a snake.

Kent then confronts Jack, having deduced that Jack hid the gold in the river. Jack, who by now considers the gold to be cursed, urges Kent to focus on the yowie. Kent refuses and Jack later kills him after a brief but intense struggle. Jack then tracks the yowie to its lair, coming across an unconscious Rhiannon and a collection of items taken by the yowie from its victims over the years.

Jack attempts to battle the yowie but is clearly outmatched and resolves to flee with Rhiannon. Coming up to a sheer cliff and with the yowie pursuing them, Jack reveals that he took a stick of dynamite from the yowie's collection. He throws the lit dynamite stick at the yowie's feet and the explosion blows the yowie to pieces. Locating a dirt road, Jack and Rhiannon begin to make their way back to civilization.

== Cast ==
- Shawn Brack as Jack
- Anthony Ring as Kent
- Melanie Serafin as Rhiannon
- Vernon Wells as Detective McNab
- Warren Clements as The Yowie

== Production ==
The film was shot over three years and was filmed in several areas of North Queensland, including Cairns, the Undara Lava Tubes, and the Crystal Cascades.

== Reception ==
Throwback won Best Foreign Film at Famous Monsters Film Fest 2014, Best Feature at Tri-Cities Fantastic Film Festival 2014, and Best Aussie Film at the 2014 GLENN Awards.
