= Alois Moyo =

Zimbabwean actor

- Born: Alois Moyo; 28 October 1966 (age 59); Bulawayo, Matabeleland, Rhodesia
- Occupations: Actor, director
- Years active: 1986–present
- Height: 5 ft 10 in (1.78 m)
- Website: http://aloismoyo.com/en/

Alois Moyo (born 28 October 1966), is a Rhodesian-born Zimbabwean–German actor and producer. He is best known for his roles in the films The Power of One and Iron Sky as well as the TV series Tatort.

== Personal life ==
He was born on 28 October 1966 in Bulawayo, Rhodesia. He currently lives in Minden in Northern Germany.

== Career ==
He started his career as an actor in theatre in 1986 with the play Citizen Mind. In 1980, Moyo co-founded the first African Theater called 'Amakhosi Township Square Cultural Center' (ATSCC) in Zimbabwe which was initially used as a karate-club and turned into a cultural institution in Zimbabwe. Since 2005, he has been living in Germany and working as an actor for theatre, film and TV. He made his cinema debut with 1992 with the film Power of One directed by John Avildsen where he played the role of an African boxer and freedom fighter.

When living in Germany, he made his first production in German called Die Zofen in 2005, and then Afrika Montage in 2007. After the success of that, he made the second German production Steinstunde der Menschheit in 2008.

== Filmography ==
Year	Film	Role	Genre	Ref.
1986	Cry Freedom		film	
1992	The Power of One	Gideon Duma	film	
2000	Stitsha		TV series	
2002	Sinjalo		TV series	
2005	Amakorokoza	Spider	TV series	
2008	Traces		TV series	
2009	Spuren	Will	Short film	
2009	The Thick	Mbege	TV series	
2009	Der Dicke	Noahs Vater	TV series	
2010	Rausch	Laye Nawesi	Short film	
2010	Die Käserei in Goldingen	Rashid Mamadou	TV movie	
2010	Verbotene Liebe	Fritz Sambu	film	
2012	Heiter bis tödlich	Souleyman Kone	TV series	
2012	Iron Sky	NYC Taxi Driver	film	
2012	Ein starkes Team	Laurent Soré	TV series	
2013	Heiter bis tödlich	Oba Obasiri	TV series	
2013	Der Bestatter	Jaja	TV series	
2015	Blindgänger	Kamali	TV movie	
2015	Großstadtrevier	Charles Gyan	TV series	
2015	Tatort: Verbrannt	Bashiir	TV series	
2015	Dahoam is Dahoam	Adunbi Guambo	TV series	
2023	Tatort: Verborgen	Jon Makoni	TV series	
