= Whitethorn (novel) =

Novel by Bryce Courtenay

Whitethorn is a 2005 novel by South Africa-born Australian author Bryce Courtenay.

== Synopsis ==
The book follows the life of Tom Fitzsaxby, an English orphan on The Boys' Farm in rural South Africa. It covers the period from 1939, when he was six years old, until he turns 30. The hardships of life in South Africa, the Boer Wars, and the Second World War are explored.

== Reception and themes ==
The book was well received. Cath Keannelly praised the book, especially the detail put into recreating the customs and places from Courtenay's early life. Dianne Dempsey noted how the book contained autobiographical elements taken from Courtenay's upbringing in South Africa. These include the deprivations faced by Tom at his boarding school and the environment of early 20th-century South Africa.
