= Brother Fish =

Novel by Bryce Courtenay

- First edition
- Author: Bryce Courtenay
- Cover artist: Nikki Townsend
- Language: English
- Publisher: Viking
- Publication date: 2004
- Publication place: Australia
- Media type: Print (hardback & paperback)
- Pages: 842 (first edition)
- ISBN: 0-670-04208-0
- OCLC: 224184876
- Dewey Decimal: 823/.914 22
- LC Class: PR9619.3.C5964 B76 2004

Brother Fish is a novel written by Bryce Courtenay that was published in 2004.

== Plot summary ==
Brother Fish is a story spanning four continents and eighty years, though the bulk of the narrative takes place in Australia and Korea. The book deals with the friendship of Jacko McKenzie, a native of the (fictional) Queen's Island in the Bass Strait, and James ‘Jimmy’ Pentecost Oldcorn, an orphaned American ex-soldier. The two have been meeting at the Gallipoli Bar of the ANZAC Hotel, Launceston, Tasmania, for 33 years, ever since their release from a prisoner of war camp in Korea.

A key feature of the novel is Jacko's recounting of his army days, first as an infantryman who enlisted too late to see any service in World War II and then as an infantryman in Korea. It was during this time that Jacko met Jimmy, an American soldier, and the book delves into the background of the latter.

== Major themes ==
The Korean War is a major theme of the first third of the book - in particular, its status as "the forgotten war", the poor performance of American troops, the brutality of the South Korean regime of Syngman Rhee, and the crimes against POWs.

Another common theme throughout the novel is music, specifically the mouth organ, which Jacko and his family are rather adept at playing. Jimmy repeatedly reminds Jacko that this music possibly saved both of them from near-certain death in Korea.

The novel explores the White Australia policy by way of the obstacles Jimmy encounters trying to secure permanent residency in Australia. In a similar vein, references appear throughout the book to Australia's racist history and its treatment of the aboriginal population as second-class citizens.

== Dedication ==
- Dedication: "For Owen Denmeade and Geoff and Phyllis Pike. Also, all the veterans of the Korean War"

== Critical reception ==
Writing in Australian Book Review Gillina Dooley noted: "Jacko, of course, is the narrator. A first-person narrator can express all sorts of views that are ironically undercut by the author's implied values. But I can see no sign of this in Brother Fish. Perhaps this is, finally, the secret of Courtenay's success. He doesn't bother his readers with any of that liberal stuff about what you can and can't say. He takes us back to a time when nobody would object if you labelled all women as manipulative and all Asians as inscrutable. As long as you say you're not racist, or sexist, then you're not. The very language is nostalgic, full of old-fashioned Australian colloquialisms and what present-day television authorities would call 'medium level coarse language'."

== Publication history ==
After the novel's initial publication by Viking in Australia in 2004 it was reprinted as follows:

- 2005 Penguin, Australia
- 2007 Michael Joseph, UK
- 2008 Penguin, Australia

== See also ==
- 2004 in Australian literature
