= Tandia =

1991 novel by Bryce Courtenay

- First edition cover
- Author: Bryce Courtenay
- Language: English
- Genre: Novel
- Publisher: Heinemann
- Publication date: May 1991
- Publication place: Australia
- Media type: Print (Hardback & Paperback)
- Pages: 900 pp (hardback edition)
- ISBN: 0-434-14614-5 (hardback edition)
- OCLC: 22665527
- Preceded by: The Power of One
- Followed by: April Fool's Day

Tandia is Bryce Courtenay's 1991 sequel to his own best-selling novel The Power of One. It follows the story of a young woman, Tandia, who was brutally raped and then banished from her own home. Tandia later meets up with Peekay, the protagonist from The Power of One and their stories continue on together.

== Plot introduction ==
In South Africa, during a time when apartheid was at its worst, Courtenay tells a story of how oppressed people worked together with those who sought justice against the inhumane dictators of the country and those who supported it. There are also storylines and themes involving boxing, which was predominant in Courtenay's earlier novel, The Power Of One.

== Plot summary ==
Tandia, whose parents were a South African Indian man (Mr. Patel) and his house worker (a black woman), is raped by a police officer at her father's grave the day after his funeral. With Mr. Patel's death, Tandia knew things were going to be very hard for her. But after his wife (Mrs. Patel) kicks her out of the dark corrugated-iron shed in the back yard, her only house, her situation has been changed more drastically than she expected. She is arrested by the police and meets the policeman who witnessed the rape on her father's grave and becomes her lifelong enemy, Jannie Geldenhuis.

Tandia finds a home in the brothel where Geldenhuis drops her. The brothel's owner and the other residents adopt her and she learns a lot of life lessons. Some of the clients of the brothel end up becoming her sponsors for her ambition to enter law school.

While Peekay and Hymie (Morrie in the American version) go to Britain to read law at Oxford University, they want to conquer the world boxing field, Peekay as world welterweight champion and Hymie as Peekay's manager. They also want to pursue justice for the country they love, South Africa. When they arrive back in South Africa, their rivalry with Jannie Geldenhuis, which began in the school where they first met, extends to both boxing and politics.

Tandia grows up to be an intelligent and very beautiful lawyer. She joins the law firm formed by Peekay and Hymie and is dedicated to providing counsel to the under-represented black and coloured population of South Africa. Her defense of a black terrorist causes her to again confront her lifelong enemy Jannie Geldenhuis who is now a powerful officer in the police force.

Tandia and Peekay develop a romantic relationship, in a country where mixed relationships are outlawed. Their growing love is very dangerous and it leads them into the most fearful consequences.

== See also ==
- List of books
