= Yowie =

Cryptid from Australian folklore

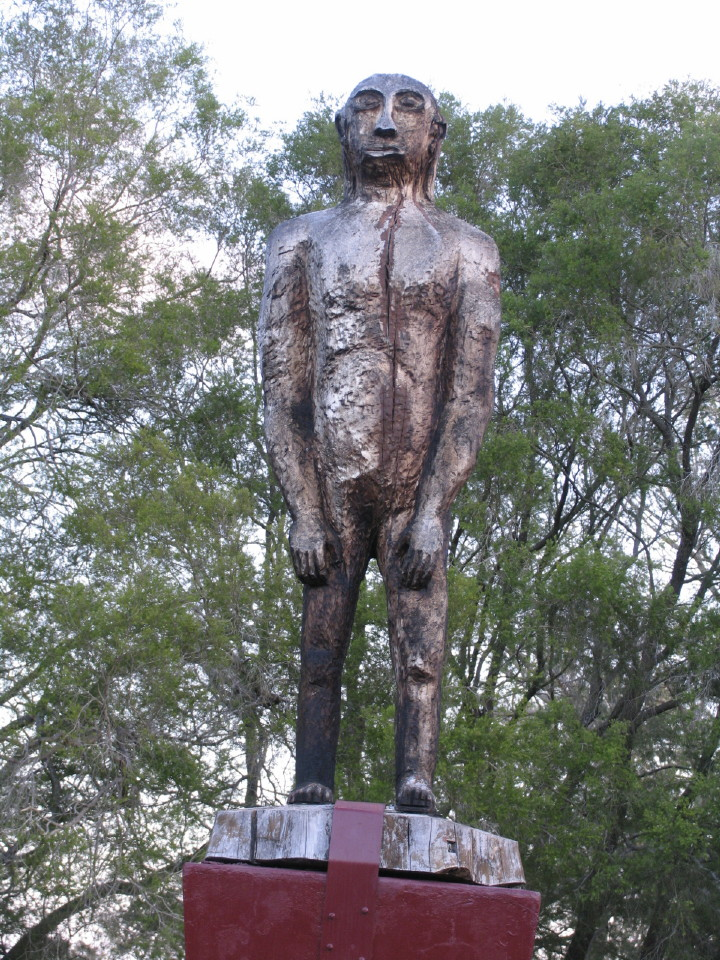
- Statue of a yowie in Kilcoy, Queensland, Australia

Origin
- Country: Australia
- Region: Great Dividing Range; Northern Territory; Australian Capital Territory; South Australia; Western Australia; New South Wales; Queensland; Victoria

The Yowie is one of several names for an Australian folklore entity that is reputed to live in the Outback. The creature has origins in Aboriginal oral history.

== Etymology and regional names ==
- In parts of Queensland, it is known as a Quinkin (or as a type of Quinkin), and as joogabinna.
- In parts of New South Wales, it is referred to by various names, including Ghindaring, Jurrawarra, Myngawin, Puttikan, Doolaga, Gulaga and Thoolagal.
- Other recorded names for similar entities include, Noocoonah, Wawee, Pangkarlangu, Jimbra and Tjangara. Legends of Yowie-type creatures appear in Aboriginal Australian legends, particularly in the eastern Australian states.

== Description and reported characteristics ==
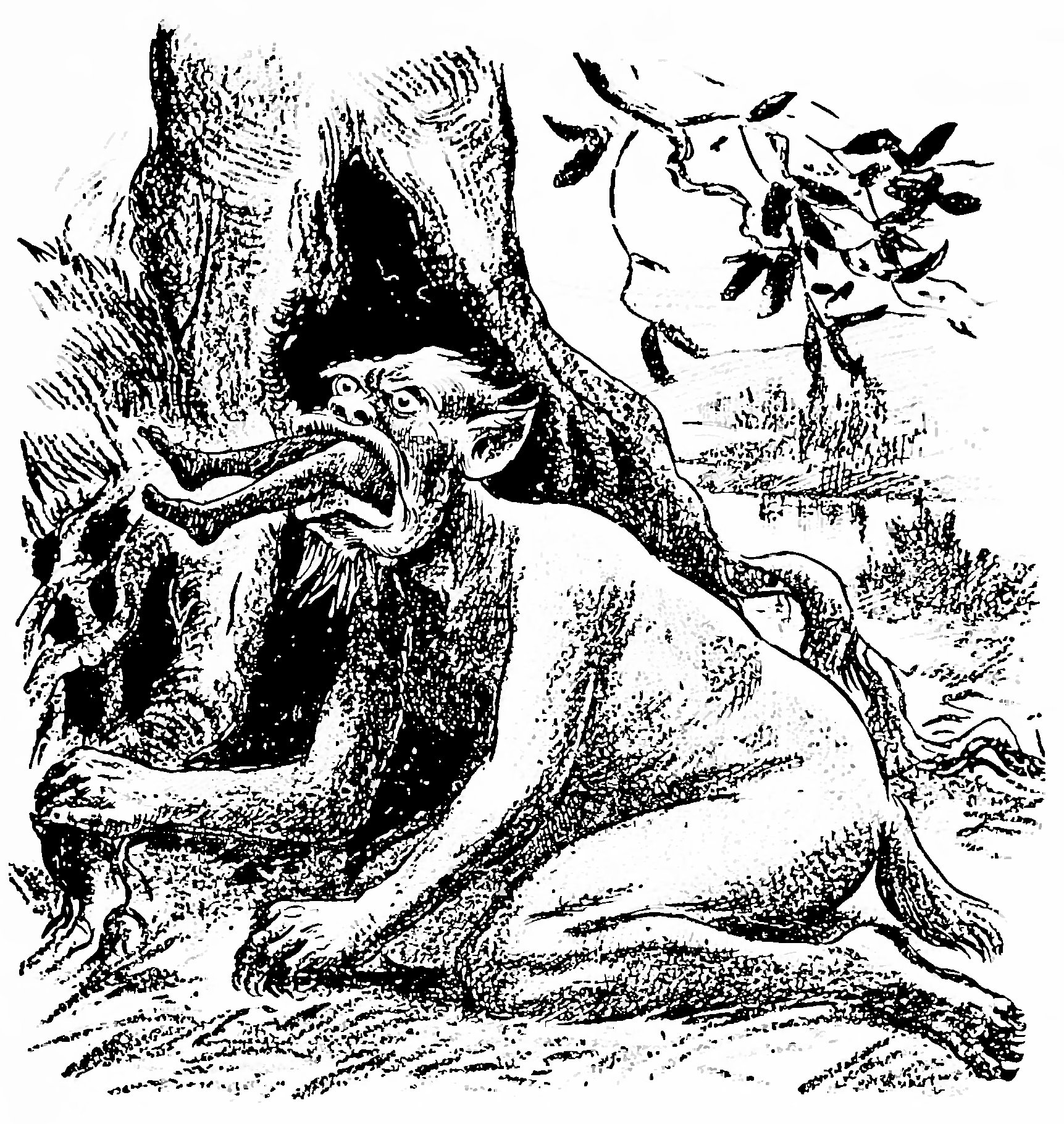
Yaroma swallowing a man (1907 drawing)

The Yowie is typically described as a bipedal, hairy, and ape-like creature, standing upright at between 2.1 m (6 ft 11 in) and 3.6 m (12 ft). Reports of Yowie footprints describe them as significantly larger than a human's, but alleged Yowie tracks are inconsistent in shape and toe number. The Yowie's nose is described as wide and flat.

Descriptions of the Yowie's behavior vary; some accounts depict the Yowie as timid and reclusive, while others suggest it can be violent or aggressive.

== Origins of the term ==
The exact origin of the name "Yowie" in reference to Australian hominid legends is uncertain. The term was documented in 1875 among the Gamilaraay people by Rev. William Ridley in Kámilarói and Other Australian Languages, where "Yō-wī" (Note: yawi in modern orthography) was described as a spirit that roams the earth at night.

Some researchers suggest that the term arose through Aboriginal legends of the "Yahoo". Nineteenth century European accounts describe the creature and deem it the Yahoo, specifically the entry of Robert Holden, who described it saying "The natives of Australia... believe in... [the] Yahoo."

Another story about the term's origins come from an Aboriginal source. One account from Old Bungaree, a Gunedah elder, stating that the Yahoo was an ancient race that once inhabited Australia. He describes conflicts between Yahoos and Aboriginal people in an event called Dreamtime, claiming that the latter usually overpowered them, although the Yahoo is said to be a fast runner.

Additionally, some scholars propose that the Yowie legend may have been influenced by European folklore. Possible sources for this claim include:

- Jonathan Swift's yahoos from Gulliver's Travels, depicted as primitive, bestial humanoids
- European myths of hairy wild men, describing hairy, ape-like beings
- Early 19th century public excitement with captive orangutans for display, which sparked curiosity about large primates

== Historical sightings ==
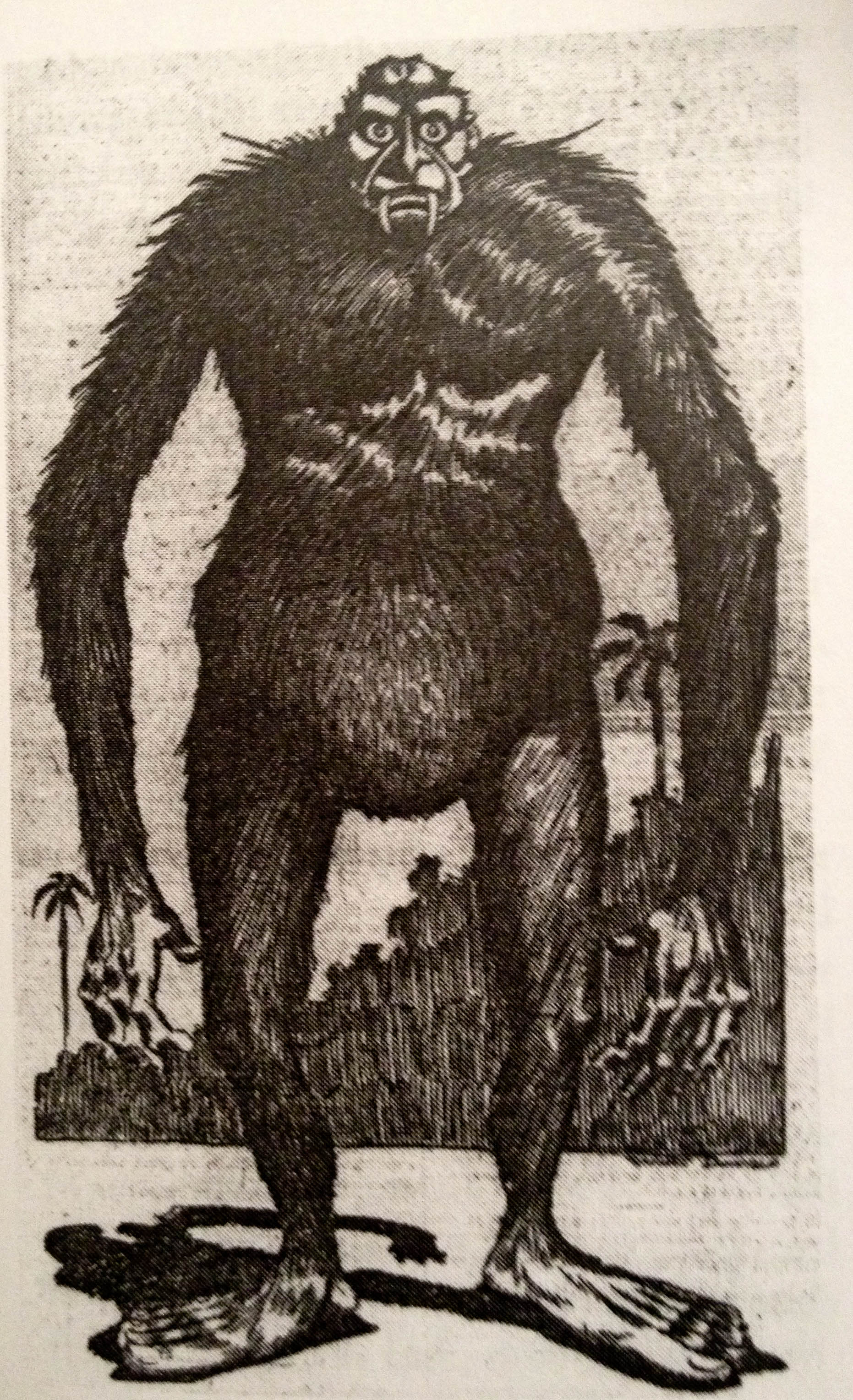
The "Bombala Anthropoid", seen by Charles Harper in southeast Australia in 1912. This fanciful drawing is based on his description in an interview in the Sidney Sun: "A huge man-like animal stood erect not 20 yards from the fire, growling, grimacing, and thumping his breast with his huge hand-like paws."

=== Early reports (19th century) ===
In a 1987 column in The Sydney Morning Herald, columnist Margaret Jones suggested that the first reported Yowie sighting in Australia occurred as early as 1795.

By the 1850s, accounts of "indigenous apes" appeared in the Australian Town and Country Journal. The earliest account in November 1876 alluded to reports of Aboriginal peoples recounting "some unearthly animal or inhuman creature ... namely the Yahoo-Devil Devil, or hairy man of the wood."

In 1882, amateur naturalist Henry James McCooey claimed to have seen an "indigenous ape" on the New South Wales south coast, between Batemans Bay and Ulladulla. He described the creature as tailless, covered in long black hair, with reddish fur around the throat and chest. He estimated its height at nearly five feet tall when standing upright and noted that its small, restless eyes were partially obscured by matted hair. McCooey claimed to have thrown a stone at the creature, prompting it to flee.

McCooey offered to capture an ape for the Australian Museum for a reward of £40. According to researcher Robert Holden, a second outbreak of reported ape sightings appeared in 1912.

The Yowie also appeared in Australian folklore and literature, including Donald Friend's Hillendiana, a collection of writings about the goldfields near Hill End, New South Wales, where it was described as a species of bunyip. Holden also cites the appearance of the Yowie's presence in a number of Australian tall stories in the late 19th and early 20th centuries.

=== Modern sightings ===
Modern reports of the Yowie continue, often associated with cryptozoology investigations.

One such case involved "Top End Yowie investigator" Andrew McGinn who claimed the death and mutilation of a pet dog near Darwin could have been the result of an attack by a Yowie.

== Regional sightings ==
=== Northern Territory ===
In the late 1990s, several reports of Yowie sightings emerged in the area around Acacia Hills.

- 1997: Mango farmer Katrina Tucker claimed she had been just metres away from a hairy humanoid creature on her property. Photographs of the large footprint were collected at the time.

=== New South Wales ===
Accounts of Yowie sightings in New South Wales include:

- 1977: The Sydney Morning Herald reported that residents on Oxley Island, near Taree, recently heard unexplained screaming noises at night. Cryptozoologist Rex Gilroy planned to search for the mythological Yowie.
- 1994: Tim the Yowie Man claimed to have seen a Yowie in the Brindabella Ranges.
- 1996: A couple from Newcastle, while driving on a holiday, claim to have seen a shaggy, upright creature between Braidwood and the coast, describing it as at least 2.1 metres tall, with disproportionately long arms and no neck.
- 2000: a Canberra bushwalker, Steve Piper, filmed an unknown bipedal beast in the Brindabella Mountains. This footage is known as the 'Piper Film'.
- 2011: a witness reported to NSW National Parks and Wildlife Service seeing a Yowie in the Blue Mountains at Springwood. The witness had filmed the creature, and taken photographs of its footprints.
- 2012: an American television crew claimed to have recorded audio of a Yowie in a remote region on the NSW–Queensland border.
- 2013: a Lismore resident and music videographer claimed to have seen a Yowie just north of Bexhill.

In the mid-1970s, the Queanbeyan Festival Board and 2CA offered a AU$200,000 reward for the capture and presentation of a Yowie. The reward remains unclaimed.

=== Queensland ===
The Springbrook region in south-east Queensland has had more Yowie reports than anywhere else in Australia.

- 1977: Former Queensland Senator Bill O'Chee reported to the Gold Coast Bulletin that he had seen a Yowie while on a school trip in Springbrook. O'Chee compared the creature to Chewbacca from Star Wars. He told reporters that the creature he saw had been over three metres tall.
- 1979: Two students camping in bushland near Kilcoy encountered a "two to three-metre brown hairy creature". The town embraced this association and the tourism it brings, and in the following decade erected a yowie statue, and named a park 'Yowie Park', and gave the local rugby team the nickname "The Yowies".
- 2001: The Mulgowie Yowie was last reported as having been seen.
- 2014: Two Yowie researchers claimed to have filmed a Yowie in South Queensland using an infrared tree camera. They also collected fur samples and found large footprints. Later that year, a Gympie man told media he had encountered Yowies on several occasions, including conversing with, and teaching some English to, a very large male Yowie in the bush north-east of Gympie, and several people in Port Douglas claimed to have seen Yowies, near Mowbray and at the Rocky Point range.

=== Australian Capital Territory ===
- 2010: A Canberra man said he saw a "juvenile covered in hair, with long arms trying to steal his car" in his garage.

== Prominent Yowie researchers and enthusiasts ==
=== Rex Gilroy ===
Since the mid-1970s, paranormal enthusiast and self-described cryptozoologist Rex Gilroy attempted to popularize the Yowie legend. He claimed to have collected over 3,000 reports of Yowie encounters and theorized that they represented a relict population of extinct apes or early Homo species.

Rex Gilroy believed that the Yowie is related to the North American Bigfoot. Along with his partner Heather Gilroy, he spent fifty years amassing his Yowie collection.

Rex Gilroy died in April 2023.

=== Tim the Yowie Man ===
Tim the Yowie Man is a published author who claims to have seen a Yowie in the Brindabella Ranges in 1994. Since then, Tim the Yowie Man has investigated Yowie sightings and other paranormal phenomena.

In 2004, Tim the Yowie Man won a legal case against Cadbury, a popular British confectionery company. Cadbury had claimed that his moniker was too similar to their range of Yowie confectionery.

=== Gary Opit ===
Gary Opit is an ABC Local Radio wildlife presenter with an interest in cryptozoology.

== Skepticism and alternate theories ==
=== Graham Joyner's perspective ===
Australian historian Graham Joyner has extensively researched the "yahoo", also referred to as the hairy man, Australian ape, or Australian gorilla, which was a subject of various reports in the nineteenth century. Joyner compiled these accounts in his 1977 publication, The Hairy Man of South Eastern Australia, aiming to shed light on this phenomenon.

In his research, Joyner suggests that the contemporary concept of the Yowie may have emerged from a misunderstanding or conflation with earlier "yahoo" reports. He posits that the Yowie was relatively unknown before the mid-1970s and that its rise in popular culture could be linked to misinterpretations of historical accounts.

== In popular culture ==
- Terror Australis: Call of Cthulhu in the Land Down Under, first published in 1987 as a supplement to the role-playing game Call of Cthulhu, includes the Yowie as one of several mythical monsters of Australia.
- Season eight of the soap opera A Country Practice (1988) features a suspected Yowie sighting.
- English-born writer Geoffry Morgan Pike devised the name and fictitious background for the Yowie brand of chocolates, launched in 1995.
- An experimental rock band by the name of Yowie formed in St. Louis, Missouri in the year 2000. A Yowie is depicted on the cover art of their debut album Cryptooology.
- In the 2001 video game Final Fantasy X, the Yowie appears as a reptilian enemy.
- The main monster in the 2003 animated film Scooby-Doo! and the Legend of the Vampire is the Yowie Yahoo, which is depicted as a vampire living in the Australian desert under the name the "Yowie Yahoo", rather than a Sasquatch-like monster simply called the Yowie.
- Yowies appear as Australian magical creatures in the 2010 book Fablehaven: Keys to the Demon Prison.
- The 2014 action-horror film Throwback centres on the discovery of, and battle with, a Yowie.
- In season four of the animated series We Bare Bears (2018), the Booby Trapper (voiced by Jemaine Clement) confuses Charlie (voiced by Jason Lee) for a Yowie.
- In the animated YouTube series The Big Lez Show, the titular character hangs out with Yowies named Sassy and Donny.
- The children's fiction book "Yowie Dreaming: A Tale of Friendship and Adventure" (2025) is about the discovery of a baby Yowie. It is set in Kilcoy which is known for its Yowie statue.

== See also ==
- List of monotremes and marsupials of Australia
- Orang Mawas
- Orang Pendek
- Ebu gogo
- Bukit Timah Monkey Man
- Yeti
- Yara-ma-yha-who, a creature from Australian Aboriginal mythology
- Dulagal, the Yuin equivalent of the Yowie
- Yeren
