= Solomon's Song =

Book by Bryce Courtenay

- First edition
- Author: Bryce Courtenay
- Language: English
- Series: Australian Trilogy
- Subject: Australian fiction, families
- Genre: Adult fiction
- Publisher: Viking Books
- Publication date: 1999
- Publication place: Australia
- Pages: 657
- ISBN: 978-0-670-87878-9
- Dewey Decimal: 823/.914 A823.3
- Preceded by: Tommo & Hawk

Solomon's Song is the final novel in the Australian Trilogy by author Bryce Courtenay. It follows the novels The Potato Factory and Tommo & Hawk, and was first published in 1999.
