= Hall Cemetery =

Cemetery in the Australian Capital Territory

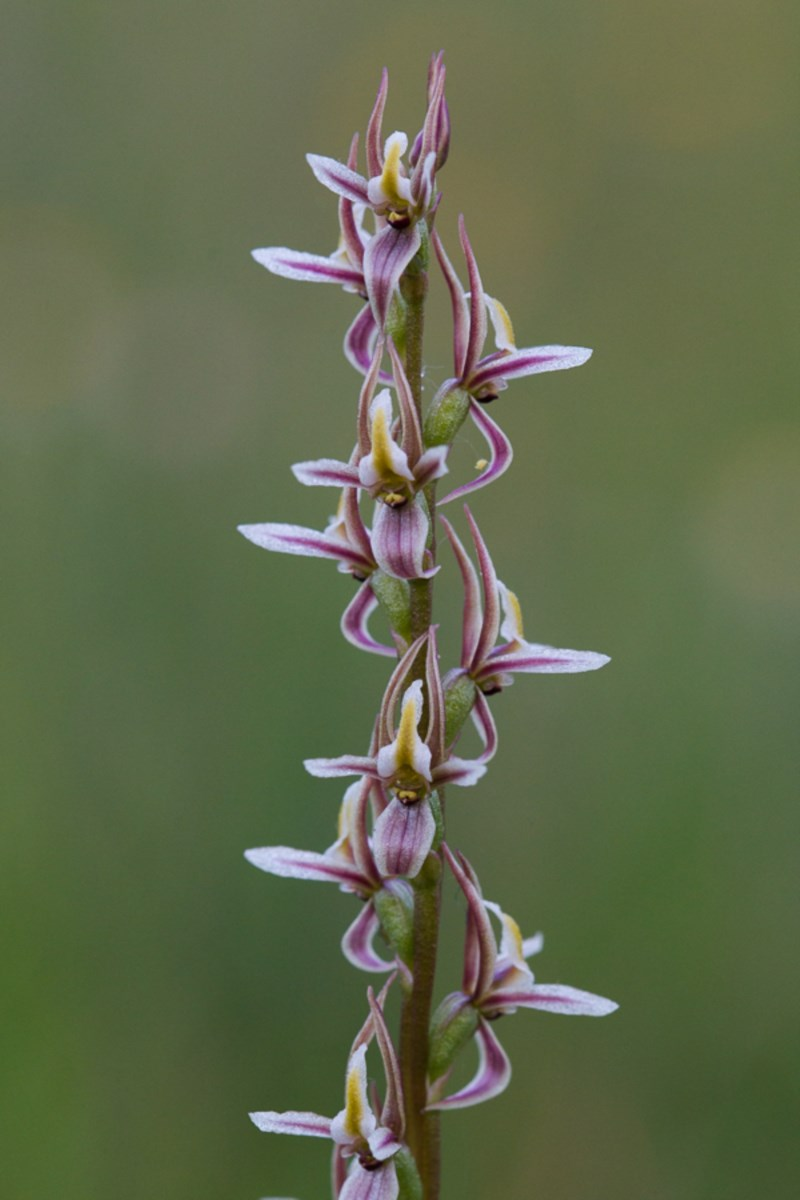
- Tarengo leek orchid
- Interactive map of Hall Cemetery

Details
- Location: Hall, Australian Capital Territory
- Country: Australia
- Coordinates: 35.172°S 149.057°E
- Owned by: ACT Public Cemeteries Authority
- Website: Hall Cemetery
- Find a Grave: Hall Cemetery

The Hall Cemetery is a small rural cemetery in Canberra, the capital of Australia. It is located in Wallaroo Road, Hall, Australian Capital Territory.

The Cemetery contains some rare and endangered plants, such as the Tarengo leek orchid.

== Notable burials ==
- Bryce Courtenay AM
