= The Family Frying Pan =

Novel by Bryce Courtenay

First (1997) edition (publ Heinemann Australia)

The Family Frying Pan is a fixup novel written by Bryce Courtenay. It was first published in 1997, then re-written and reissued in 2001.

== Background to the novel ==
The novel was originally published as a series of semi-linked short stories. It received various changes and a back story and was re-published as such.

The author claims that the main character is heavily based on his first wife's grandmother.

== Plot ==
Set initially in Tsarist Russia, the novel tells of Sara Moses, always known as 'Mrs Moses'. She is a sixteen-year-old servant girl who is the sole survivor of a pogrom in her shtetl. She manages to escape and is able to bring with her only a heavy frying pan found in the ruins of the Rabbi's house.

She travels across Russia, hoping to find freedom and safety, utilising the pan to cook what food she is able to find. As she travels, she is joined by various fellow-escapees from Russia. Every night, around the cooking fire, each traveller tells a tale from his or her life.

Mrs Moses eventually finds sanctuary in Australia and marries a fellow (non-Jewish) Russian refugee. Their great-granddaughter, the narrator, continues to cook fish every Friday evening for shabbat dinner, using the frying pan, which is possessed of a Russian Soul.

== See also ==
- Geoffrey Chaucer
- The Canterbury Tales
