= The Potato Factory =

1995 novel by Bryce Courtenay

First edition (publ. Heinemann Australia)

The Potato Factory is a 1995 fictionalised historical novel by Bryce Courtenay, which was made into a four-part miniseries in Australia in 2000. The book is the first in a three-part series, followed by Tommo & Hawk and Solomon's Song. The Potato Factory has been the subject of some controversy regarding its historical accuracy and its portrayal of Jewish characters.

The book is based on Ikey Solomon, known as the "Prince of Fences" and the basis of the Fagin character in the Charles Dickens novel Oliver Twist. Courtenay states that it is a fictional historical novel based on extensive research, but it depicts fictionalised versions of the characters. Author Judith Sackville-O'Donnell, who wrote another book on Solomon, claimed that the book was inaccurate and antisemitic.

The book's other main characters are Solomon's wife, Hannah, and his (fictional) mistress, Mary Abacus. Abacus goes from serving girl, to prostitute, to high-class madam, to prisoner transported to Tasmania, to successful businesswoman. She gets her name for her outstanding ability to use an abacus.

The story starts in London in the early 19th century. Abacus and Ikey Solomon start working together as business partners. It follows them as they are separately sent to Tasmania, a penal colony at the time.

Abacus takes up the art of brewing and establishes a pub called The Potato Factory while raising her children by Solomon. Meanwhile, Hannah, who also has children, views Abacus as her bitter rival. The book tells of Hannah's attempts to destroy Abacus.

== Television miniseries ==
A four-part miniseries filmed in New South Wales, Australia, first aired in July 2000.

=== Cast ===
- Ben Cross as Ikey Solomon / Reuban Reuban
- Lisa McCune as Mary Abacus
- Sonia Todd as Helen Solomon
- Robert Grubb as Mr Emmett
- David Ngoombujarra as Billy Gonequeer
- Di Smith as Margaret Keating
- Linal Haft as George Madden
- Firass Dirani as David Soloman
