= Geoffry Morgan Pike =

Australian writer and cartoonist (1929-2018)

Geoff Pike
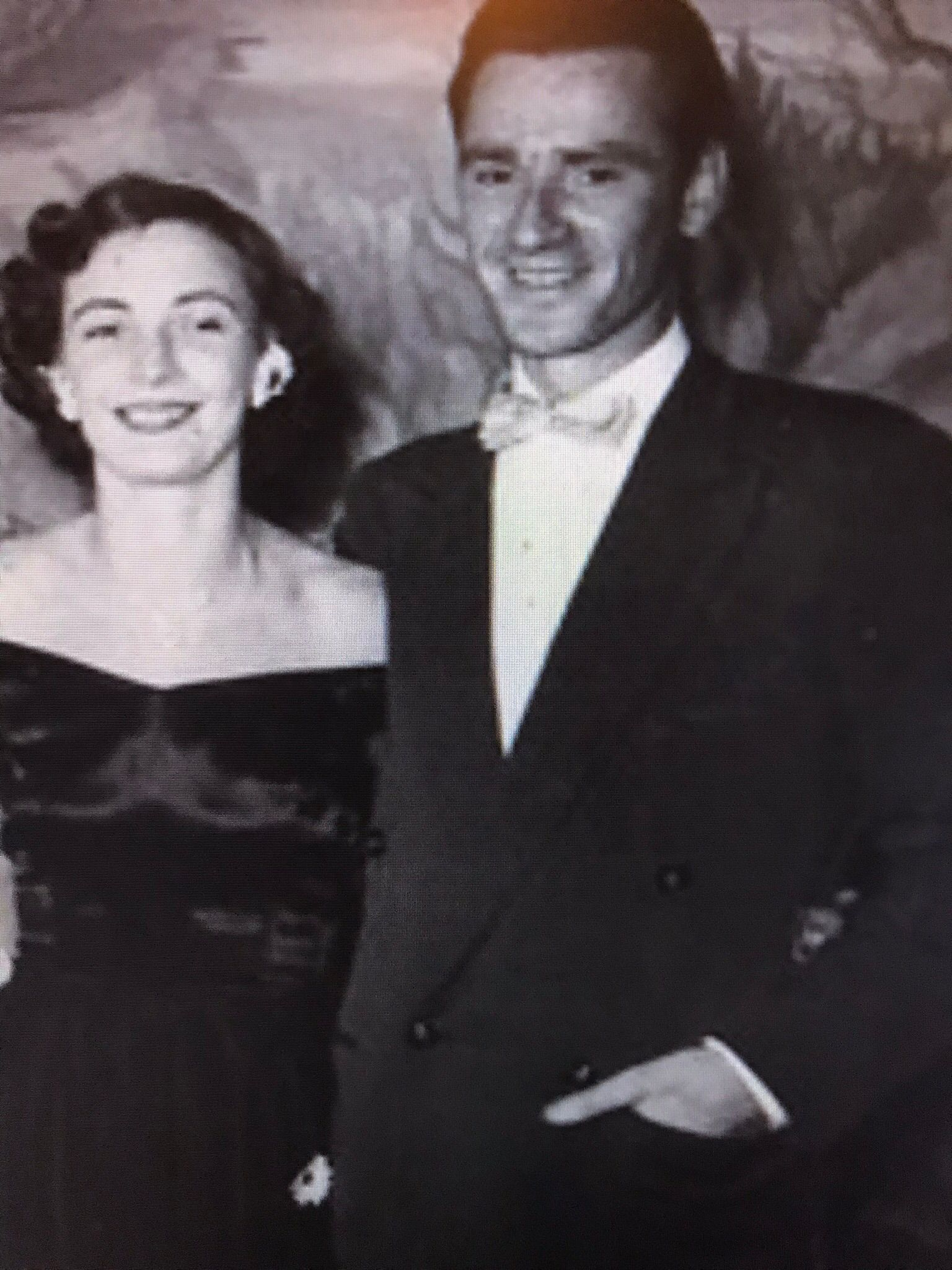
- Geoff Pike, pictured with wife Glenys (née Evans)
- Born: 17 October 1929; Tottenham, Middlesex, England
- Died: 8 March 2018 (aged 88); Sydney, NSW, Australia
- Occupations: Novelist and Cartoonist
- Spouse: Glenys Evans
- Writing career
- Period: 1974–2010
- Genres: Adventure novel, Historical novel
- Notable work: Red Lotus
- Website: paikitfai.com

Geoffry Morgan Pike (17 October 1929 – 8 March 2018), (known under the pen names Geoff Pike and Pai Kit Fai, was an English-born, naturalized Australian writer and cartoonist.

== Early years ==
Geoffry Morgan Pike was born in Tottenham, Middlesex on 17 October 1929, to parents Mildred and Robert Pike. He has two siblings Anthony J. Pike and Peter Robert Pike. At age 14 he entered training on the Navy ship HMS Indefatigable, and went to sea in 1945 aged 15. In 1949, Pike emigrated to Australia where he worked in the outback breaking horses, felling trees and sailing aboard deep-sea trawlers before he signed on as an artistic director on many popular cartoons such as Beetle Bailey and Krazy Kat with American Paramount Studios. Unbearable Bear in T.V. Tours, an animated cartoon series for Artransa Park Television, featured a globe trotting koala with itchy feet.

Pike worked with Bryce Courtenay at McCann Erickson advertising agency, most notably on the Mortein advertisement, "Louie the Fly". Bryce wrote the jingle and Geoff created the cartoon and animation. He also created the animation for the McWilliam's monk advertisement and the popular Yowie characters featured in children's picture books and Cadbury's line of confectionery containing small plastic toys.

In 1977 Pike was diagnosed with throat cancer and learned the art of qigong and traditional Oriental medicine rather than surgery, beating cancer and becoming a master of qigong, creating books and videos teaching others the philosophy and practice of aligning breath, physical activity and awareness for mental, spiritual and corporeal health.

He died in March 2018 at the age of 89 after many years of ill health.

Pike's brother, Anthony (better known as Tony Pike), opened Pikes Hotel in Ibiza, famous for its lavish celebrity parties during the 1980s.

== Writing ==
In 1974 he published the first of many books, Henry Golightly: a novel of the sea. Published by Angus and Robertson, it was the story of a Gweilo (caucasian foreigner) living in Macau and building a boat amongst the locals; a youthful search for adventure and love among the post-war wreckage of 1945 and the horror that was Hiroshima.

Pike also wrote under the name Pai Kit Fai, which was given to him by his Chinese in-laws. Loosely translated, it means "White Person of Letters and Grand Ambition'. He wrote two books under this pen name, The Concubine's Daughter and Red Lotus.

== Bibliography ==
Fiction:

- Red Lotus (2010 – pseudonym – Pai Kit Fai)
- The Concubine’s Daughter (2009 – pseudonym – Pai Kit Fai)
- Tiger dawn (1997)
- The Second Sunrise (1995)
- Golightly Outback (1978)
- Golightly Adrift (1976)
- Henry Golightly: a novel of the sea (1974)

Non Fiction:

- Ch’i: The Power Within. (1985)
- Ch’i:The Power is You (1985)
- Youth and Beauty Secrets of the Orient (1982)
- The Power of Ch’i (1980)

Animated scripts:

- Princess Serena and the Magic Crystal
- Unbearable Bear in T.V. Tours, 13 episodes

Children's books, 1995–2001:

- Rumble the redgum Yowie
- Crag the mangrove Yowie
- Boof the bottlebrush Yowie
- Ditty the lillipilli Yowie
- Squish the fiddlewood Yowie
- Nap the honeygum Yowie

Children's books, 1964: Around the world with Unbearable Bear series (adapted by Laurie Sharpe):

- Unbearable Bear in Boy Meets Bear
- Unbearable Bear in London
- Unbearable Bear in Ireland
- Unbearable bear in Scotland

== Awards and honours ==
- The Times Book of the Week: Red Lotus
- A&R Writer's Fellowship
