= Bryce Courtenay =

South African–Australian writer (1933–2012)

Bryce Courtenay AM
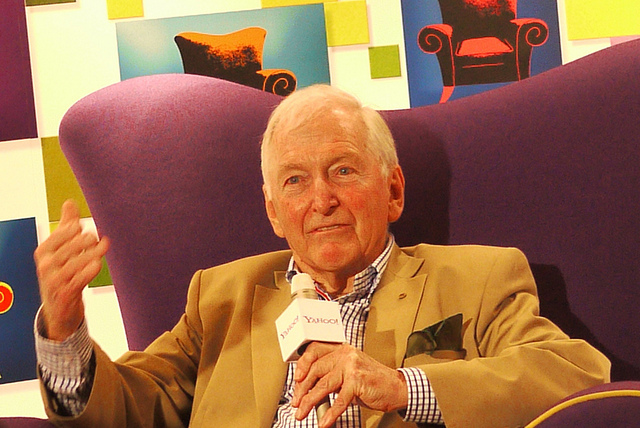
- Born: Arthur Bryce Courtenay; 14 August 1933; Lebombo Mountains, South Africa
- Died: 22 November 2012 (aged 79); Canberra, Australian Capital Territory
- Resting place: Hall Cemetery, Canberra
- Occupation: Novelist
- Writing career
- Period: 1989–2012
- Genres: Bildungsroman, historical novel
- Notable awards: British Book Awards; 1990 The Power of One

Arthur Bryce Courtenay, AM (14 August 1933 – 22 November 2012) was a South African-Australian advertising director and novelist. He is one of Australia's best-selling authors, notable for his book The Power of One.

== Background and early years ==
Arthur Bryce Courtenay was born in the Lebombo Mountains in what was then the Union of South Africa, the son of Maude Greer and Arthur Ryder. Ryder was married with six children, and lived with his family, but also maintained a relationship with Greer, with whom he already had a daughter, Rosemary. Maude Greer gave the surname Courtenay to both her children. Bryce Courtenay spent most of his early years in a small village in the Lebombo Mountains in the Northern Transvaal province (present-day Limpopo). He later attended King Edward VII School, Johannesburg.

In 1955, while studying journalism in London, Courtenay met Benita Solomon. They emigrated to Sydney in 1958, married in 1959 and had three sons – Brett, Adam and Damon.

Courtenay entered the advertising industry and, over a career spanning 34 years, was the Creative Director of McCann Erickson, J. Walter Thompson and George Patterson Advertising. His award-winning campaigns included the original Milkybar Kid commercial.

Along with Geoff Pike, Courtenay developed the concept behind the Cadbury Yowie, a chocolate that contained a children's toy, typically an Australian or New Zealand native animal.

On 1 April 1991, Courtenay's son Damon (who was born with haemophilia) died at age 24 from AIDS-related complications, contracted through a blood transfusion.

Courtenay divorced Benita in 2000 and acknowledged sexual relationships with other women during their 42-year marriage. Benita Courtenay died on 11 March 2007, at the age of 72, four months after being diagnosed with acute myeloid leukaemia. He later lived in Canberra with his second wife, Christine Gee.

== Writing ==
Courtenay's novels are primarily set in South Africa, the country of his birth, or Australia, his adopted country. His first book, The Power of One, was published in 1989 and, despite Courtenay's fears that it would never sell, quickly became one of Australia's best-selling books by any living author. The story was made into a film, as well as being re-released in an edition for children.

Courtenay was one of Australia's most commercially successful authors. He built up this success over the long term by promoting himself and developing a relationship with readers as much as marketing his books; for instance, he gave away up to 2,500 books free each year to readers he met in the street. However, only The Power of One has been published in the United States. Courtenay claimed that this was because "American publishers for the most part have difficulties about Australia[;] they are interested in books in their own country first and foremost. However, we receive many e-mails and letters from Americans who have read my books and I am hoping in the future that publishers will recognize that there is a market for all my books in the U.S."

Courtenay had a very strong work ethic, often writing 12 hours a day, and he normally wrote a book each year during his writing career. He turned to writing in the late 1980s after a 30-year career in advertising. In his lifetime, he sold more than 20 million copies of his books worldwide.

== Death ==
In September 2012, Courtenay announced that he was suffering from terminal gastric cancer and that his last book would be Jack of Diamonds. He died from cancer at age 79 on 22 November at his Canberra home, two weeks after the release of Jack of Diamonds.

== Awards and honours ==
- Member of the Order of Australia (AM): 1995; in recognition of service to advertising and marketing to the community and as an author
- Doctor of Letters (D.Litt.) (honoris causa): 2005; from the University of Newcastle
- Doctor of the University (D.Univ.) (honoris causa): 2012; from the University of Canberra
- Australia Post Literary Legend: 2010; honoured on an Australian postage stamp

== Bibliography ==
=== African books ===
- The Power of One (1989)
- The Power of One: Young Readers Edition (1999)
- Tandia (1992)
- The Night Country (1998)
- Whitethorn (2005)

=== Australian trilogy ===
- The Potato Factory (1995)
- Tommo & Hawk (1997)
- Solomon's Song (1999)

=== Nick Duncan Saga ===
- The Persimmon Tree (2007)
- Fishing for Stars (2008)

=== Poetry ===
- A Recipe for Dreaming (1994)

=== Other fiction ===
- The Family Frying Pan (1997)
- Jessica (1998)
- Smoky Joe's Cafe (2001)
- Four Fires (2001)
- Matthew Flinders' Cat (2002)
- Brother Fish (2004)
- Sylvia (2006)
- The Story of Danny Dunn (2009)
- Fortune Cookie (2010)
- Jack of Diamonds (2012)

=== Non-fiction ===
- April Fool's Day (1993)
- Kyle, Roy. Edited by Courtenay, Bryce. (2003). An Anzac's Story. Penguin Books, Victoria. ISBN 0-14-300187-6.
- The Silver Moon (2015)
