= Four Fires =

2001 novel by Bryce Courtenay

- First edition (publ. Viking Australia)]
- Author: Bryce Courtenay
- Language: English
- Genre: Novel
- Publisher: Viking
- Publication date: 2001
- Publication place: Australia
- Media type: Print
- Pages: 777 pp.
- ISBN: 0670910627

Four Fires is a 2001 novel written by Bryce Courtenay.

== Plot ==
The Maloney family live in a Victorian town, Yankalillee, in the Wangaratta-Wodonga area. The family is in many ways dysfunctional, but they are also fiercely loyal to each other and their friends and supporters. They start the novel far down the social ladder, but strive to rise up it, in spite of those who seek to keep them down.

== Characters ==
=== The Maloney family ===
Tommy; a descendant of Irish Catholic convicts, he is technically the head of the family, although only two of the children were fathered by him. A born "bushie" who fights in World War II as a corporal in the Australian army, he is captured after the fall of Singapore. He survives years of hell as a POW and barely survives the Death Marches from Sandakan to Ranau. Back home, physically and psychologically damaged, he alternates between bouts of alcoholism, prison terms for petty theft and "going bush". He is a respected bushfire fighter. He tells his horrific wartime story, which he has never told before, to his son Mole.

Nancy is the mother of the family, physically and mentally strong and unafraid to stand up to anyone, even her social "betters". In Tommy's (frequent) absences, she runs a garbage business under contract to the shire council. Her children regard her as a "collapsed catholic" (from Nancy's term: "Lapsed Catholic").

Sarah is the oldest child. A brilliant student, she is accepted into medical school, but becomes pregnant and has to fight to be admitted. She graduates with honours.

Michael aka Mike, has artistic talents and learns the fashion trade in Melbourne. Unable to find a way to promote his unorthodox designs, he moves to London.

Bozonik aka Bozo, has boxing talent and, as a protégé of the town police sergeant, wins a bronze medal at the Rome Olympics. He joins Nancy in the garbage collecting business, expanding it eventually into a major trucking and passenger transport concern.

Peter aka Mole is the narrator of the novel. He is Tommy's favourite child and learns bush lore and bush fire fighting from him. He joins the army and serves in Vietnam as a sergeant/warrant officer. He is decorated for saving an office from certain death under heavy fire. A brilliant student, he obtains a degree and a doctorate and becomes a university lecturer. He is reunited with his childhood sweetheart, Anna Dumbrowski, now a respected psychiatrist.

The fifth child is "Little" Colleen, Tommy's second biological child.

=== Supporters and friends of the Maloney family ===
"Big Jack" Donovan, local police sergeant.

Morrie and Sophie Suckfizzle, aka Moishe and Zofia Zuckfizzleski, a Jewish couple who survived the concentration camps in Poland and Germany. Morrie is a former surgeon who requalifies and becomes a respected gynaecologist.

Father Crosby, the local Catholic minister, who goes head to head with Nancy regarding her family morals, but is ultimately reconciled with the family.

Karpurika Raychaundhuri aka Mrs. Rika Ray, an Indian-born herbalist, ayurvedic healer and midwife who delivers Sarah's daughter, Lucy Tempelton Moloney. She joins Bozo in the family business.

John Crowe, a childhood friend of Tommy and shire mechanic. He becomes a business partner of Bozo. He is killed in a horrific bushfire.

Lucy Barrington-Stone, wife of a wealthy grazier and pillar of the Country Women's Association. She makes it her personal mission to get Sarah admitted to university.

The novel takes place throughout Australia and in Vietnam, Thailand, Fiji, America, Poland and Italy. Real life figures such as Dawn Fraser, Muhammad Ali and Josef Mengele appear in the novel.

== Background ==
The title is derived from a quote (unspecified, but possibly of Indigenous Australian origin):

There are four fires of our dreaming
The bushfire of our land's renewal
The war fire of good men killing
The soul fire of a different God
The fires of a consuming love

The novel focuses on the Maloney family, who live in country Victoria. It also deals with many major events and issues in Australian history, as seen through the eyes of, or experienced by, the Maloneys. These include feminism, bushfires and PTSD. The story covers a time period from the late 1940s to 1999.

== Notes ==
- Dedication: This book is dedicated to all the soldiers of the 8th Australian Division, especially those who were sent to Borneo and did not come home.

== Critical reception ==
Writing in The Canberra Times a reviewer noted: "Courtenay has once again proved himself a master of picturesque Australian speech, including a generous sprinkling of vulgarisms...Not only Aussie English can be learnt from this novel. The author offers expert advice on how to cope with a bushfire threatening your home, how to recognise Australian birds and plants, how to fix a damaged TV set or a broken-down truck, how to win a boxing bout, not forgetting how to enrol in a medical course during pregnancy, and especially, as all the Maloneys were well aware, to take the spoon out of the sink before turning on the tap. For an explanation of this helpful family proverb, turn to page 255. Despite its almost 800 pages, this is a hard-to-put-down novel that invites a re-reading at leisure and with a deeper understanding of the fires of passion, of religion, of war, and of love the four fires of the book's title. It is a remarkable achievement."

In The Advertiser a review of the book ends with: "Four Fires is unashamedly a story of the power of love and the triumph of the human spirit against the odds. Not since writing The Power of One have I felt this close to a book."
