= Jack of Diamonds (novel) =

First edition (publ. Viking Australia)

Jack of Diamonds is a 2012 novel by Australian author Bryce Courtenay.

It is Courtenay's final novel, finished shortly before his death from stomach cancer.
