= Yowie (chocolate) =

Chocolate

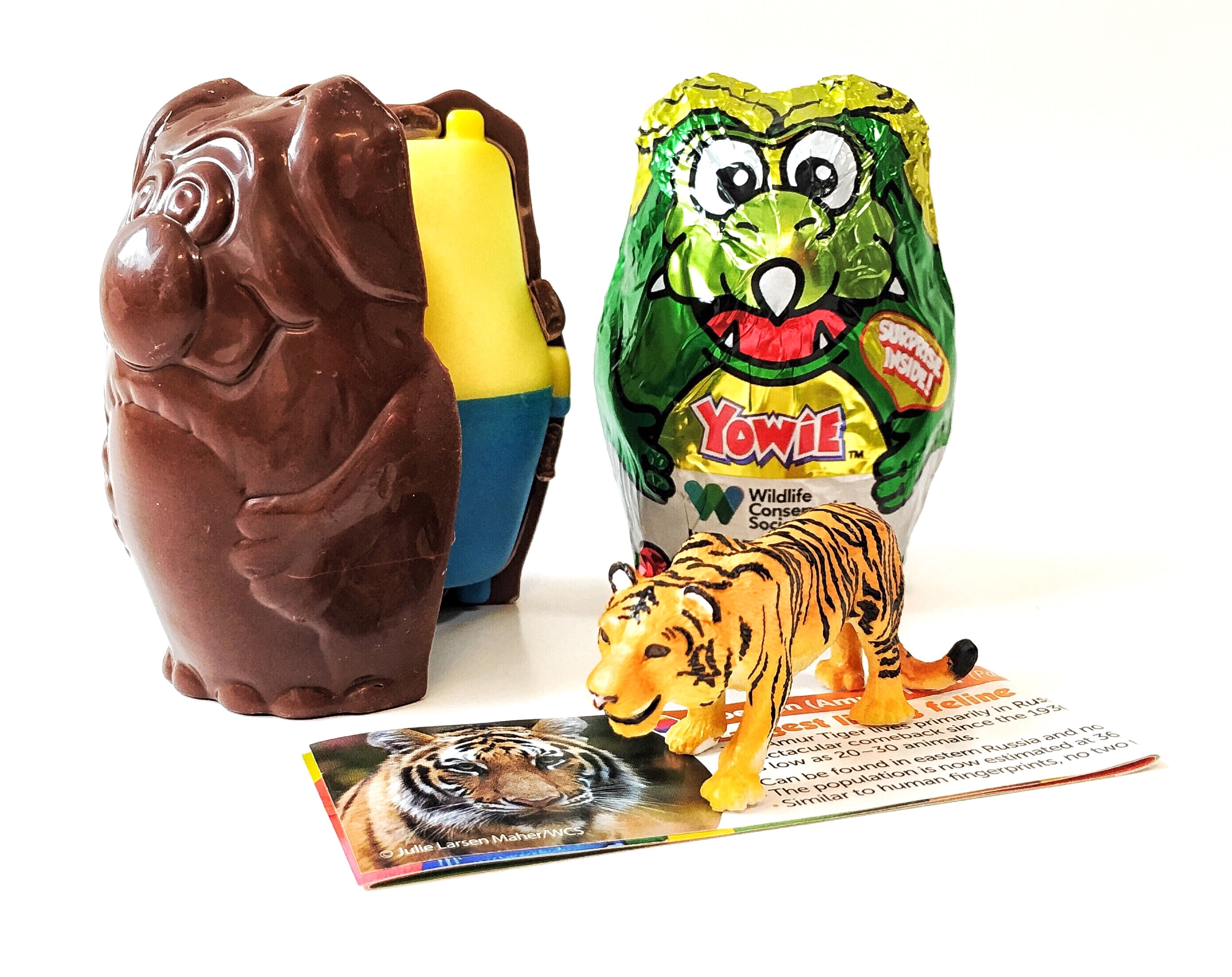
- Website: Yowie World website

Yowie is a confectionery brand originating in Australia in 1995. First produced by Cadbury under licence from Kidcorp, it was one of the top selling chocolates in Australia in the late 1990s and early 2000s, selling over a million units a week. After a break of nearly a decade, Yowie was relaunched in 2014 for US markets. The brand had been acquired by a Perth based Australian company, the Yowie Group, in 2012. The chocolates reemerged in the Australian and New Zealand markets in 2017.

== History ==
=== Development ===
The English-born advertising man, illustrator and author Geoff Pike and South African-Australian advertising director and novelist Bryce Courtenay originated the Yowie concept. Serving in the Royal Navy, Pike jumped ship in Australia, finding work as a jackaroo on remote cattle stations. He became enchanted by Australia's outback and its unique wildlife, and devoted his free time to nursing injured and orphaned animals back to health.

Decades later, after a successful career in advertising, Pike drew on these early bush experiences and his love of wild places to create the Yowie Kingdom, a fictional magical realm free of the destructive influence of humanity, where threatened wildlife finds a safe haven. Inspired by Australian folklore, Pike borrowed the mythical man-like creature, the Yowie, reputed to roam the Australian bush. To watch over the fictional Yowie Kingdom and its animals and plants, Pike created six Yowie characters, each related to a well-known Australian animal, and each one guardian of key wild habitats:

- Boof the Bottlebrush Yowie, cousin of the bandicoot, protector of rainforests and mountains
- Crag the Mangrove Yowie: cousin of the Saltwater crocodile, protector of swamps and wetlands
- Ditty the Lillipilli Yowie: cousin of the wombat, protector of woodlands and meadows
- Nap the Honeygum Yowie: cousin of the koala, protector of forests and bushland
- Rumble the Redgum Yowie: cousin of the red kangaroo, protector of deserts and plains
- Squish the Fiddlewood Yowie: cousin of the platypus, protector of rivers and streams

Additional characters included animal companions for each of the six Yowies, and Balthizar the Bunyip, ruler of the Yowie Kingdom. To represent the threats facing the world's natural habitats and threatened species, Pike created the Grumkin, careless creatures constantly seeking to destroy the harmony of the Yowie Kingdom. The Grumkins were: Munch (careless building, enemy of Rumble), Blob (pollution, enemy of Crag), Ooz (also pollution, enemy of Squish), Spark (careless firelighting, enemy of Nap), Slob (littering, enemy of Ditty) and Chomp the Tiger Toothed Tree Chomper (deforestation, enemy of Boof).

Pike enlisted the aid of long-time friend, fellow advertising man and best-selling author Bryce Courtenay. They hit upon the idea of a confectionery product as a vehicle for Yowie, and in 1994 pitched the concept to confectionery giant Cadbury.

== Initial launch ==
After three years developing the characters and the manufacturing process, in 1997 Cadbury launched Yowie as a foil-wrapped character-shaped milk chocolate shell containing a plastic capsule. Within the capsule was a multi-part collectable model of a native Australian or New Zealand animal, together with a leaflet featuring information, a photo of the animal and assembly instructions for the collectable. The first series featured 50 animals, plus figurines of each of the six Yowie characters. Pike and Courtney retained the intellectual property rights in the Yowie concept, which was licensed to Cadbury by Kidcorp.

Cadbury Yowie was selling over one million units weekly and in its first year sold 2.5 Yowies for every man, woman and child in Australia. The brand won multiple industry awards in Australia and internationally, including Best Global Supermarket Product and Best Global Confectionery Product at the 1997 Sial international food industry awards in Paris.

Cadbury Yowie was also released in Singapore, Japan and the United Kingdom.

=== Publishing and merchandising ===
To coincide with the release of the Cadbury Yowie, a series of books was released, telling the stories of the Yowie characters as they protect their domains from the threat of the Grumkin. Written by Geoff Pike and Bryce Courtenay and illustrated by award-winning artists Christopher Minos and Helen Steele, the series sold more than 2 million copies, topping the Australian best-seller lists for children's books.

Numerous lines of Yowie merchandise were produced, including soft toys, clothing, games, activity books, and Yowie music CDs.

A Yowie collector scene soon emerged with collector clubs forming across Australia and New Zealand and websites devoted to displaying and swapping Yowie collectables.

== Further Yowie series ==
Following the success of the first series of Yowie collectables, a second series was released in 1998, this time featuring fifty new animals.

The third series of Yowie, released in early 1999, was composed of fifty figurines and six limited edition mini Grumkins. This series remained the most common of all the series, extending into 2002, with further scattered releases until the series ended in 2005.

The fourth series was released in late 1999 and featured "Yowie World" collectables, with animals from beyond Australia and New Zealand, as well as six limited edition crystal Yowies, six "Yowie playmates" and a Lord Balthizzar figurine. It extended until 2005.

=== Yowie and the Lost Kingdoms ===
In 2000, Yowie partnered with the Australian Museum to create Yowie and the Lost Kingdoms, a series of collectables featuring extinct animals from around the world and across the geological ages, including dinosaurs and other reptiles as well as extinct Australian megafauna. The Lost Kingdoms series was based on illustrations by Dr Anne Musser of the Australian Museum and was overseen by the director of the museum, Dr Michael Archer. The packaging was overhauled so that the wrappers of the Lost Kingdoms Yowies could be distinguished by the sign and shovel being held in their paws. The museum presented an exhibition of fossils and reconstructions linking to the series.

Series A had fifty prehistoric figurines and six limited edition skulls. It was later replaced by Series B, released in 2001, which had thirty figurines and six limited edition glow-in-the-dark dinosaurs. In 2002 the third and final series, Series C, was released, with thirty figurines and six limited edition "dazzling dinosaurs".

=== Yowie Adventures ===
In 2001, Yowie Adventures was released, based around comic-strip stories in which the Yowie and their friends save endangered animals from the onslaught of the Grumkin. The series had thirty figurines, and was often regarded as the rarest series; supplies of this series were perceived as limited. The series consisted of model figurines in five categories: animals, enemies, "yurts", helpers and transports, with six of each kind. The series was updated in 2002 with a second release of thirty figurines. This series was similar to its predecessor, except it had a higher number of animal figurines, while the Yowie and helpers were replaced with Grumkins and helpers.

=== Yowie Forgotten Friends ===
In 2003 and 2004, the Yowie Forgotten Friends series was released. Featuring recently extinct animals, the series highlighted the increasing levels of species extinction and the importance of protecting threatened wildlife and habitats. The Forgotten Friends "Series A" comprised thirty figurines, with six glow-in-the-dark Yowies. In 2004, "Series B" of the Forgotten Friends range was released, this time with five limited edition glow-in-the-dark Grumkins. Spark was left out as it was regarded as a bad message to children.

== Relaunch ==
Production of Cadbury Yowie was discontinued in 2005 following a dispute between Cadbury and the Yowie creators. In 2012 a new company, Yowie Group, was formed to relaunch the brand. A series of 24 solid one-piece collectables, including 18 animals and six Yowie character models, was designed and manufactured. The one-piece format enabled more lifelike collectables and improved product safety.

The first series features the following animals:

- African Grass Owl
- Alpaca
- American Bison
- Brown Bear
- Caracal
- Common Clownfish
- Emperor Penguin
- European Rabbit
- Fennec Fox
- Galapagos Tortoise
- Giant Anteater
- Giant Panda
- Gray Wolf
- North American Beaver
- Platypus
- Polar Bear
- Red Kangaroo
- Southern Hairy-nosed Wombat

In July 2014, the first new Yowie products went on sale in the US. Production of the chocolate and final assembly was undertaken by Whetstone Chocolates, based in Florida. There was strong initial growth with sales reaching one percent of total "front end" (at the cash register) confectionery sales in the US. Deals for product placement in Walmart in 2015, and other major retailers followed. The Yowie Group's revenue rose from a base of nil to $17 million (AUD) in its first two years.

Its early success in the US was partly attributed to being the only novelty-containing confectionery permitted for sale in the United States at the time. A longstanding ban in the US on such "surprise inside" chocolates as choking hazards meant direct competitor products were absent from the marketplace. Yowies were granted an exemption, as the chocolates with their internal capsules were made using a patented process; the process reduced the risks by making the inserts easily visible even with the chocolate still intact. Sales growth later slowed, with Kinder Surprise was allowed to enter the US in 2018, outperforming Yowie. Disputes with its contract manufacturer, Whetstone Chocolates and the Atlantic Candy Company resulted in litigation. Listed on the Australian Securities Exchange, Yowie Group' share price declined precipitously after making several revised revenue forecasts in 2018 and 2019, which predicted lowered earnings. From 2016, Yowie products were manufactured by Madelaine Chocolate Company of New York state.

Yowie products returned to Australian and New Zealand retail shelves in April 2017.

In 2018, Yowie had an animated series Yowasis narrated by Mel Gibson. It ran for seven episodes.

In 2020 two new series had been announced, one series containing mini chocolate with a toy in a polybag. Also released a Gummy line called "Yowie gummies" which had a plastic animal resembling a Popular pet in the real world.

Both Yowie Bites and Gummies were announced to be discontinued in 2022 for an unspecified reason.
