= Uno =

Uno or UNO may refer to:

== Arts, entertainment, and media ==
=== Films ===
- Uno (2004 film), a Norwegian drama
- Uno (2005 film), a Philippine action thriller

=== Games ===
- Uno (card game), a 1971 card game created by Merle Robbins
  - Uno (1999 video game), a 1999 digital adaptation for the Game Boy Color
  - Uno (video game), a 2006 digital adaptation

=== Music albums ===
- Uno (La Ley album), 2000
- Uno (Malpaís album), 2003
- Uno (Uno Svenningsson album), 1994
- Uno (ThisGirl album), 2004
- Uno (Panna Fredda album), 1971
- ¡Uno!, 2012, by Green Day

=== Songs ===
- "Uno" (Ambjaay song), a 2019 rap
- "Uno" (Little Big song), a 2020 Russian Spanglish song
- "Uno" (Muse song), 1999
- "Uno" (Enrique Santos Discépolo and Mariano Mores song), a 1943 tango popularized by Carlos Gardel
- "Uno Song", by Self from the 1999 album Breakfast with Girls

=== Television episodes ===
- "Uno" (Better Call Saul), 2015, the American crime drama's premiere episode

=== Television channels and stations ===
- Rai Uno, an Italian TV channel
  - Telegiornale Uno, a news program
- Sky Uno, another Italian TV channel
- Italia Uno, another Italian TV channel
- Azteca Uno, a Mexican TV channel
- Red Uno de Bolivia, a Bolivian television network
- Tele Uno (Austria), a defunct Austrian television channel

== Organizations ==
=== Political organizations ===
- United Nations Organization, a regional misnomer for the United Nations
- A New Option or Una Nueva Opción (UNO), non-profit organization in Ecuador
- National Opposition Union or Unión Nacional Opositora (UNO), Nicaraguan political organization from the 1960s
- National Opposition Union or Unión Nacional Opositora (UNO), Salvadoran political organization from the 1970s
- National Opposition Union or Unión Nacional Opositora (UNO), Nicaraguan political organization from the 1990s
- United Nations-Oceans, mechanism of the United Nations system
- United Nicaraguan Opposition, Nicaraguan political organization 1985–2000
- United Opposition (Philippines) (UNO) now Genuine Opposition, Philippine umbrella political coalition
- Ukrainian National Union or Ukrayins'ke Natsional'ne Ob'yednannya (UNO), Carpatho-Ukrainian political party in 1939

=== Academic organizations ===
- National University of the West (Universidad Nacional del Oeste), Argentine national university
- University of Nebraska Omaha, Omaha, Nebraska, United States
  - Omaha Mavericks, also called UNO Mavericks, the athletic program of the above school
- University of Negros Occidental - Recoletos (UNO-Recoletos or UNO-R), Bacolod City, Negros Occidental, Philippines
- University of New Orleans, New Orleans, Louisiana, United States
  - New Orleans Privateers, also called UNO Privateers, the athletic program of the above school
- UNO Charter Schools, a branch of United Neighborhood Organization

=== Brands and enterprises ===
- Uno (bus company), bus service operated by the University of Hertfordshire, England, United Kingdom
- Uno Pizzeria & Grill, a restaurant franchise, also known as Pizzeria Uno or Uno's
- Gasolineras Uno, a multinational gas stations company based in Honduras

== People ==
- Uno (given name)
- Uno (surname)

== Places ==
=== United States ===
- Uno, Arkansas, an unincorporated community
- Uno, Kentucky, a small town
- Uno, Ohio, an unincorporated community
- Uno, West Virginia, an unincorporated community

=== Elsewhere ===
- Uno (Guinea-Bissau), an island in the Bissagos Islands of Guinea-Bissau
- Uno Station, a train station in Tamano, Okayama Prefecture, Japan

== Science and technology ==
- Uno (software), an open source cross-platform graphical user interface
- Uno (unit) (symbol: U), an IUPAP unit proposal for dimensionless numbers and parts-per notation
- Universal Network Objects, or UNO, a component model used in OpenOffice.org and derivatives
- Unniloctium (chemical symbol: Uno), former temporary name of the chemical element Hassium
- Arduino Uno, open-source microcontroller board

== Vehicles ==
- Uno (dicycle), an electric vehicle sometimes described as a motorcycle
- Fiat Uno, a supermini car
- UNO 001, a Swedish sports car

== Other uses ==
- Uno (dog) or K-Run's Park Me In First, a beagle, 2008 "Best in Show" winner of the Westminster Kennel Club Dog Show
- Uno, a type of single point score in indoor American football
- Upazila Nirbahi Officer, or UNO, an officer who administers an Upazila in Bangladesh

== See also ==
- One (disambiguation)
- Uno, dos, tres (disambiguation)
