= UNOS (disambiguation) =

UNOS, Unos or unos may refer to:

- United Network for Organ Sharing, a non-profit, scientific and educational United States-based organization dedicated to organ donation and transplant
- UNOS (operating system), a discontinued 32-bit Unix-like real-time operating system
- Uno Pizzeria & Grill, a United States-origin franchised pizzeria restaurant chain

== See also ==
- UNO (card game)
- Uno (disambiguation)
- ¡Uno!
