= Uno (surname) =

Uno (written: 宇野), is a Japanese surname. People with this surname include:

- Edison Tomimaro Uno (1929–1976), Asian American and Japanese American civil rights activist
- Caol Uno (born 1975), Japanese mixed martial arts fighter
- Kozo Uno (1897–1977), Japanese economist
- Masami Uno (born 1942), Japanese anti-Semitism propagandist
- Michael Toshiyuki Uno, film and television director
- Raymond Uno (1930–2024), state district court judge
- Sandiaga Uno (born 1969), Indonesian businessman and politician
- Sōsuke Uno (1922–1998), 75th Prime Minister of Japan
- Shoma Uno, Figure Skater
- Tab Uno (born 1955), Salt Lake City board of education member

== See also ==
- Uno (given name)
- Uno (disambiguation)
