= Kanagawa 2nd district =

Kanagawa 2nd district, Diet of Japan lower house

- Parliamentary constituency for the House of Representatives
- A map of the House of Representatives constituencies in Yokohama
- Prefecture: Kanagawa
- Proportional District: Southern Kanto
- Electorate: 435,659 (2020)

Current constituency
- Created: 1994
- Seats: One
- Party: Liberal Democratic
- Representative: Shōbun Nitta
- Created from: Kanagawa 1st district (1947–1993); Kanagawa 4th district (1975–1993)
- Municipalities: Nishi-ku, Minami-ku and Kōnan-ku in Yokohama

Kanagawa 2nd district (神奈川県第2区, Kanagawa-ken dai-niku or 神奈川2区, Kanagawa niku) is a single-member constituency of the House of Representatives, the lower house of the national Diet of Japan. It is located in eastern Kanagawa Prefecture and consists of Yokohama city's Nishi (West), Minami (South) and Kōnan wards. As of December 1, 2020, 435,659 eligible voters were registered in the district.

Before the electoral reform of the 1990s, the area had been split between the former four-member 1st district and the former five-member 4th district.

The 2nd district's longest-serving representative since the electoral reform has been Liberal Democrat Yoshihide Suga (without factional affiliation), the former Prime Minister of Japan, and a former member of the Yokohama city council who entered the Diet as a newcomer in 1996. He was able to beat Akihiro Ueda (New Frontier Party, ex-Kōmeitō), one of the incumbents for the pre-reform 4th district. In subsequent elections, he defended the seat against Democrats Akira Ōide and Kazuya Miura. Suga was Internal Affairs Minister in the First Abe cabinet and Chief Cabinet Secretary in the Second Abe Cabinet. Shōbun Nitta succeeded Suga in 2026 following his retirement.

== List of members representing the district ==
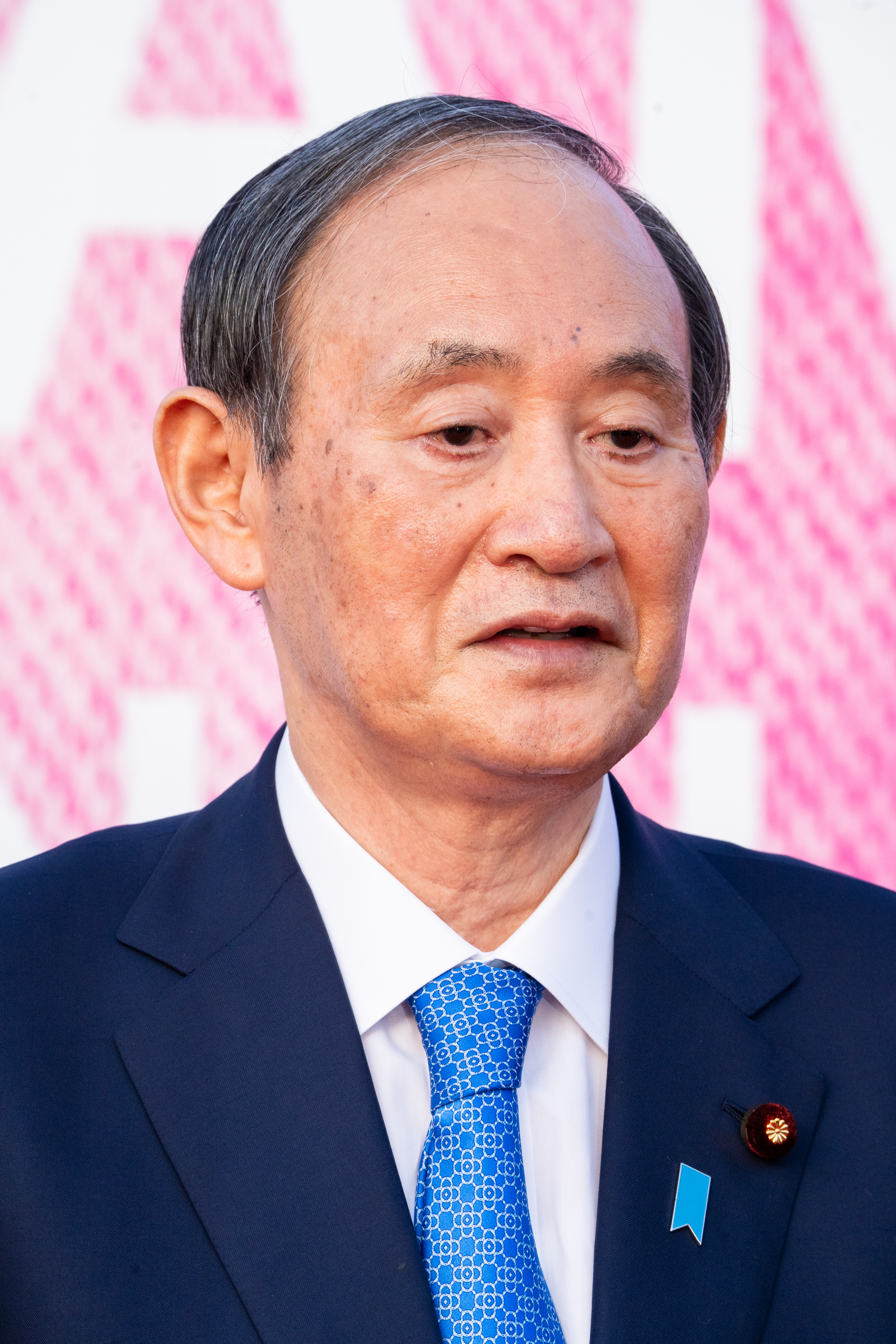
Yoshihide Suga represented the constituency from its inception in 1996 until 2026.

Election	Member	Party	Notes
1996	Yoshihide Suga	Liberal Democratic	Minister for Internal Affairs and Communications (2006–2007); Chief Cabinet Secretary (2012–2020); President of the Liberal Democratic Party (2020–2021); Prime Minister of Japan (2020–2021); Vice President of the Liberal Democratic Party (2024–2025)
2026	Shōbun Nitta	Liberal Democratic	

== Election results ==
=== 1996 ===
General election 1996: Kanagawa's 2nd
Party	Candidate	Votes	%
LDP	Yoshihide Suga	70,459	32.2
New Frontier	Akihiro Ueda	65,905	30.2
Democratic	Akira Ohide	44,184	20.2
JCP	Chiemi Miwa	30,550	14.0
New Socialist	Yasuhiko Matsunaga	5,855	2.7
Liberal League	Tomoki Kanoya	1,555	0.7
Total votes		218,508	100.0
LDP win (new seat)			

=== 2000 ===
General election 2000: Kanagawa's 2nd
Party	Candidate	Votes	%
LDP	Yoshihide Suga	95,960	42.3
Democratic	Akira Ohide (elected by PR)	93,434	41.2
JCP	Miwako Yukawa	37,485	16.5
Total votes		226,879	100.0
LDP hold			

=== 2003 ===
General election 2003: Kanagawa's 2nd
Party	Candidate	Votes	%
LDP	Yoshihide Suga	115,495	49.8
Democratic	Akira Ohide (re-elected by PR)	93,406	40.3
JCP	Miwako Yukawa	22,997	9.9
Total votes		231,898	100.0
LDP hold			

=== 2005 ===
General election 2005: Kanagawa's 2nd
Party	Candidate	Votes	%
LDP	Yoshihide Suga	160,111	58.4
Democratic	Akira Ohide	91,723	33.5
JCP	Miyako Itaya	22,284	8.1
Total votes		274,118	100.0
LDP hold			

=== 2009 ===
General election 2009: Kanagawa's 2nd
Party	Candidate	Votes	%
LDP	Yoshihide Suga	132,270	46.5
Democratic	Kazuya Mimura (elected by PR)	131,722	46.3
JCP	Osamu Takayama	20,366	7.1
Total votes		284,358	100.0
LDP hold			

=== 2012 ===
General election 2012: Kanagawa's 2nd
Party	Candidate	Votes	%
LDP	Yoshihide Suga	138,040	57.9
Democratic	Kazuya Mimura	71,302	29.9
JCP	Toshiaki Kodama	28,947	12.1
Total votes		238,289	100.0
LDP hold			

=== 2014 ===
General election 2014: Kanagawa's 2nd
Party	Candidate	Votes	%
LDP	Yoshihide Suga	147,084	67.7
JCP	Chiemi Miwa	47,119	21.7
People's Life	Kōzō Okamoto	23,011	10.6
Total votes		217,214	100.0
LDP hold			

=== 2017 ===
General election 2017: Kanagawa's 2nd
Party	Candidate	Votes	%
LDP	Yoshihide Suga	123,218	57.1
CDP	Noe Takahashi	47,191	21.9
Kibō no Tō	Kumi Hashimoto	28,635	13.3
JCP	Kiyofumi Ohnuki	16,699	7.7
Total votes		215,743	100.0
LDP hold			

=== 2021 ===
General election 2021: Kanagawa's 2nd
Party	Candidate	Votes	%
LDP	Yoshihide Suga	146,166	61.1
CDP	Eiko Okamoto	92,880	38.9
Total votes		239,046	100.0
LDP hold			

=== 2024 ===
2024
Party	Candidate	Votes	%	±%
Liberal Democratic (endorsed by Komeito)	Yoshihide Suga (incumbent)	119,548	52.27	▼4.84
CDP	Tōzaburō Yanagiya	47,222	20.61	▼18.24
Reiwa	Ryō Miyoshi	27,535	12.02	New
Communist	Mariko Namiki	19,538	8.53	New
Sanseitō	Kōjirō Hiramoto	15,315	6.68	New
Majority		152,326	31.66	▲9.36
Registered electors		435,540		
Turnout		229,158	54.33	▼1.67
LDP hold				

=== 2026 ===
2026
Party	Candidate	Votes	%	±%
Liberal Democratic	Shōbun Nitta	112,930	47.9	▼4.37
DPP	Chie Katayama	45,947	19.5	
Centrist Reform	Tōzaburō Yanagiya	42,309	18.0	▼2.65
Sanseitō	Kōjirō Hiramoto	19,222	8.2	▲1.52
Communist	Mariko Namiki	15,150	6.4	▼2.13
Majority		66,983	28.4	▼3.26
Registered electors		434,633		
Turnout		235,558	55.23	▲0.90
LDP hold				

House of Representatives (Japan)
Preceded by Yamaguchi 4th district	Constituency represented by the prime minister 2020 – 2021	Succeeded by Hiroshima 1st district
