= Hachiro Okonogi =

Japanese politician

- 小此木 八郎
- Official portrait, 2008

Chairman of the National Public Safety Commission
- In office 16 September 2020 – 25 June 2021
- Prime Minister: Yoshihide Suga
- Preceded by: Ryota Takeda
- Succeeded by: Yasufumi Tanahashi
- In office 3 August 2017 – 2 October 2018
- Prime Minister: Shinzo Abe
- Preceded by: Jun Matsumoto
- Succeeded by: Junzo Yamamoto

Member of the House of Representatives; from Southern Kanto
- In office 16 December 2012 – 18 July 2021
- Preceded by: Eiko Okamoto
- Succeeded by: Kenji Nakanishi
- Constituency: Kanagawa 3rd
- In office 19 July 1993 – 16 July 2009
- Preceded by: Hikosaburo Okonogi
- Succeeded by: Eiko Okamoto
- Constituency: Kanagawa 1st (1993–1996); PR block (1996–2000); Kanagawa 3rd (2000–2009)

Personal details
- Born: 22 January 1965 (age 61) Naka, Yokohama, Japan
- Party: Liberal Democratic
- Parent: Hikosaburo Okonogi (father)
- Relatives: Utaji Okonogi (grandfather)
- Education: Tamagawa University

Hachiro Okonogi (小此木 八郎, Okonogi Hachirō; born 22 June 1965) is a former Japanese politician who has served in the House of Representatives representing Kanagawa Prefecture. He also served in the Cabinet as Chairperson of the National Public Safety Commission, Minister in charge of Building National Resilience, and Minister of State for Disaster Management from 2017 to 2018. He is a member of the Liberal Democratic Party.

== Early life ==
Okonogi was born in Yokohama, Kanagawa. His father, Hikosaburo Okonogi, served in the House of Representatives from 1969 to 1991.

Okonogi graduated from Tamagawa University in 1989 and worked as his father's assistant. Following his father's death in 1991, he was hired as secretary to Foreign Minister Michio Watanabe in 1992.

== Political career ==
Okonogi was elected for the first time in the 1993 general election, and was re-elected in the 1996 general election. In August 1998, he was appointed Director of the LDP Youth Division, and in October 1999, he was appointed Parliamentary Vice-Minister of Education, Science, Sports and Culture. After holding his seat in the 2000 general election and 2003 general election, he became the youngest Vice Minister in Japanese history in 2004 with his appointment as Senior Vice Minister of Economy, Trade and Industry under Prime Minister Junichiro Koizumi. After holding his seat in the 2005 general election, he served as LDP Deputy Secretary-General starting in November 2005, and as Deputy Chairman of the Diet Affairs Committee starting in September 2006.

Okonogi was voted out of office in the 2009 general election. While the LDP was in the opposition, he was appointed Chairman of the Commission for Research on the Government for the Federation of Kanagawa Prefecture LDP Branches in April 2010.

Okonogi returned to office in the 2012 general election. He was appointed LDP Chief Deputy Secretary-General in December 2012, Acting Chairman of the Diet Affairs Committee in October 2013, and Chairman of the Federation of Kanagawa Prefecture LDP Branches in April 2014.

As disaster management minister under Prime Minister Shinzo Abe, Okonogi oversaw the government's response in 2018 to Typhoon Jebi, which resulted in the flooding of Kansai International Airport and extensive damage throughout the surrounding Kansai region. He left the Cabinet following a reshuffle in October 2018.

Okonogi has been close to Yoshihide Suga for many years, having known Suga since elementary school, when Suga was in his 20s and serving as an aide to Okonogi's father. Suga mentored Okonogi in his first political campaign, and Okonogi served as Suga's campaign director during the 2020 LDP leadership election.
