= Yoshihide Suga =

Prime Minister of Japan from 2020 to 2021

- 菅 義偉
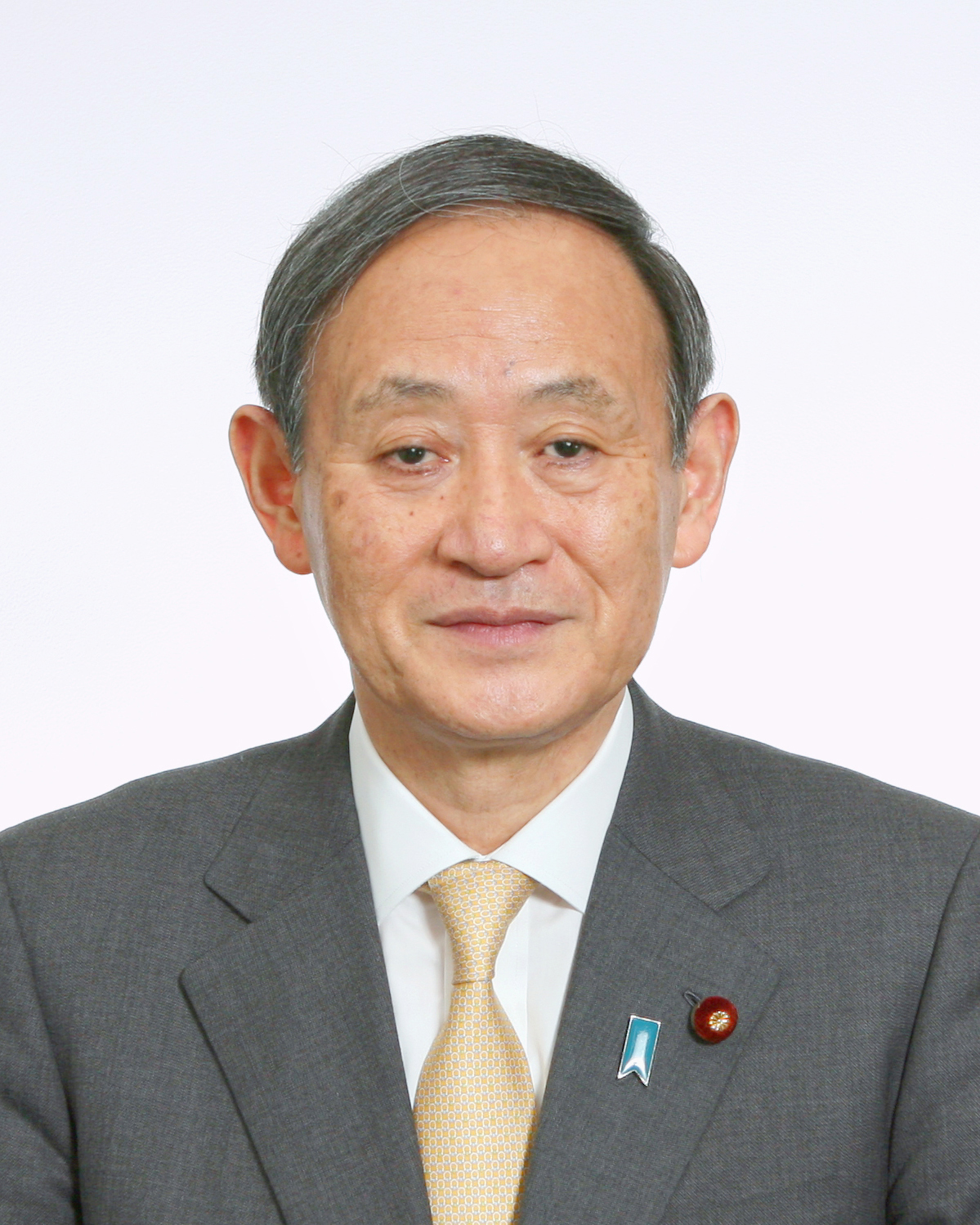
- Official portrait, 2020

Prime Minister of Japan
- In office 16 September 2020 – 4 October 2021
- Monarch: Naruhito
- Deputy: Tarō Asō
- Preceded by: Shinzo Abe
- Succeeded by: Fumio Kishida

President of the Liberal Democratic Party
- In office 14 September 2020 – 29 September 2021
- Secretary-General: Toshihiro Nikai
- Preceded by: Shinzo Abe
- Succeeded by: Fumio Kishida

Vice President of the Liberal Democratic Party
- In office 30 September 2024 – 7 October 2025
- President: Shigeru Ishiba
- Secretary-General: Hiroshi Moriyama
- Preceded by: Tarō Asō
- Succeeded by: Tarō Asō
Ministerial offices
Chief Cabinet Secretary
In office 26 December 2012 – 16 September 2020
Prime Minister	Shinzo Abe
Preceded by	Osamu Fujimura
Succeeded by	Katsunobu Katō
Minister for Internal Affairs and Communications
In office 26 September 2006 – 27 August 2007
Prime Minister	Shinzo Abe
Preceded by	Heizō Takenaka
Succeeded by	Hiroya Masuda

Member of the House of Representatives
- In office 20 October 1996 – 23 January 2026
- Preceded by: Constituency established
- Succeeded by: Shōbun Nitta
- Constituency: Kanagawa 2nd

Personal details
- Born: 6 December 1948 (age 77) Yuzawa, Akita, Japan
- Party: Liberal Democratic
- Spouse: Mariko Suga
- Children: 3
- Education: Hosei University (LLB)
- Website: Official website

Yoshihide Suga (菅 義偉, Suga Yoshihide; born 6 December 1948) is a Japanese former politician who served as Prime Minister of Japan from 2020 to 2021. A member of the Liberal Democratic Party (LDP), he was the party's president from 2020 to 2021 and also represented Kanagawa 2nd in the House of Representatives from 1996 to 2026. Before his premiership, he was the Minister for Internal Affairs and Communications from 2006 to 2007, and the longest serving Chief Cabinet Secretary during the second administration of Prime Minister Shinzo Abe from 2012 to 2020.

Born to a family of strawberry farmers in rural Akita Prefecture, Suga moved to Tokyo after graduating from high school, where he enrolled in Hosei University. Shortly after graduating, Suga became an aide to Representative Hikosaburo Okonogi in 1975, before entering politics himself when he was elected to the Yokohama Municipal Assembly in 1987. In the 1996 election, Suga was elected to the House of Representatives, representing Kanagawa's 2nd district as a member of the Liberal Democratic Party (LDP).

During his time in the Diet, Suga became a close ally of Chief Cabinet Secretary Shinzo Abe. When Abe first became prime minister in 2006, he appointed Suga to the Cabinet as Minister for Internal Affairs and Communications. Suga left the Cabinet a year later, but after the LDP won the 2012 election, Suga was appointed Chief Cabinet Secretary, a role he would hold throughout Abe's second term as prime minister. This made him the longest-serving Chief Cabinet Secretary in Japanese history. In September 2020, after Abe announced that he would resign due to health concerns, Suga was elected to succeed him in the LDP presidential election and was subsequently elected prime minister by the Diet and appointed by Emperor Naruhito.

Suga's premiership focused primarily on responding to the COVID-19 pandemic, including overseeing the rollout of vaccines in the country. Suga's time in office also saw the holding of the delayed 2020 Summer Olympics and Paralympics in Tokyo and the announcement of a plan for Japan to reach carbon neutrality by 2050. While Suga began his time in office relatively popular, his approval ratings fell due to public dissatisfaction with the government's handling of the pandemic and the Olympic Games. Facing hesitancy from his party amid preparation for the upcoming 2021 general election, Suga announced on 3 September 2021 that he would not seek reelection in the 2021 LDP presidential election, effectively resigning as party president and prime minister. His tenure officially ended on 4 October 2021 after he was succeeded by Fumio Kishida. From 2024 to 2025, he served as the LDP's vice president. Suga retired from public office in February 2026 following that month's lower house election.

== Early life and education ==
Yoshihide Suga was born on 6 December 1948, to a family of strawberry farmers in Ogachi (now Yuzawa), a rural area in Akita Prefecture, and moved to Tokyo after graduation from Yuzawa High School. He attended night school to earn a Bachelor of Laws from Hosei University in 1973. Suga chose Hosei "because it was the cheapest option available" and he "worked in a cardboard factory in Tokyo to pay his tuition".

== Political career ==
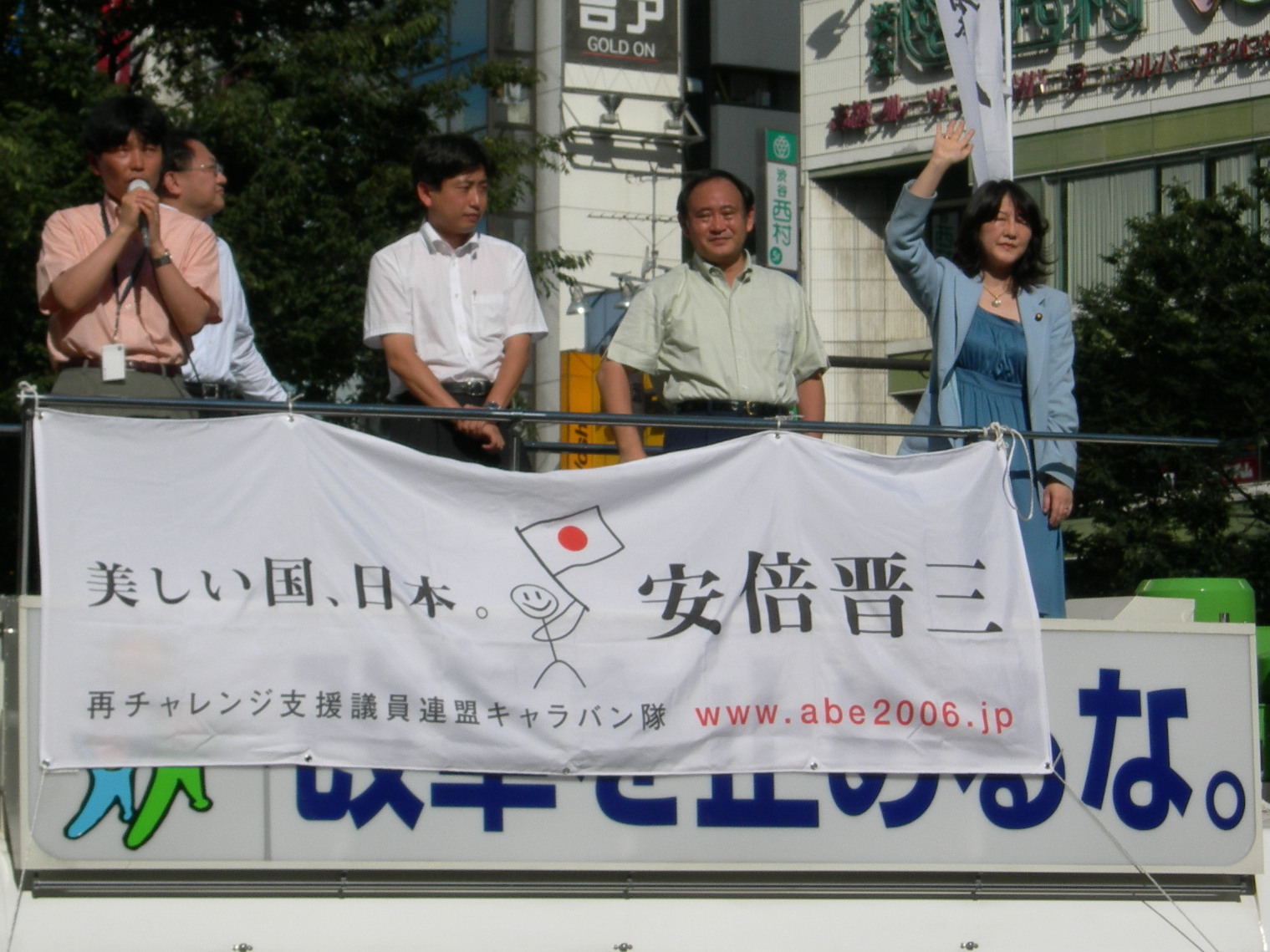
Suga with Ichita Yamamoto and Satsuki Katayama (19 September 2006)

After graduating from university, Suga worked on a House of Councillors (upper house) election campaign, and thereafter worked as secretary to LDP Diet Member Hikosaburo Okonogi, father of LDP politician Hachiro Okonogi, for eleven years. Suga resigned from this position in October 1986 to pursue his own career in politics. He was elected to the Yokohama City Council in April 1987, campaigning door-to-door on foot, visiting as many as 30,000 houses and wearing through six pairs of shoes. He pioneered the practice of giving campaign speeches in front of busy train stations, which is now common among Japanese political candidates. Despite being a young councilor, Suga presided over the highest levels of government, which earned him the nickname "the shadow mayor".

=== Representative ===
Suga was elected to the Diet of Japan in the 1996 general election, representing the Kanagawa 2nd district. In his third year in the Diet, he shifted his support from Prime Minister Keizo Obuchi to former LDP Secretary-General Seiroku Kajiyama, an unusual move for a junior legislator. He was re-elected in the 2000 general election, 2003 general election, and 2005 general election.

Suga was appointed Senior Vice Minister for Internal Affairs and Communications in November 2005 under Prime Minister Junichiro Koizumi. He was promoted to Minister of Internal Affairs and Communications and Minister for Privatization of the Postal Services in the first Shinzo Abe cabinet in September 2006, and added the portfolio of Minister of State for Decentralization Reform in December 2006. He was instrumental in the development of Japan's "hometown donation" (ふるさと納税, furusato nōzei) system, which allowed taxpayers to obtain deductions by donating money to local governments. He was replaced by Hiroya Masuda in a cabinet reshuffle in August 2007.

His "street-corner" campaigning style was credited with holding his seat in the 2009 general election, when many other LDP lawmakers lost their seats amid a surge in support for the Democratic Party of Japan.

In October 2011, he was appointed Chairman of the LDP Party of Organization and Movement Headquarters. In September 2012, he was appointed Executive Acting Secretary-General of the LDP.

As a Diet member, Suga built a power base among legislators not affiliated with the party's factions, particularly a group of young first-generation lawmakers known as the "Ganesha group".

=== Chief Cabinet Secretary ===
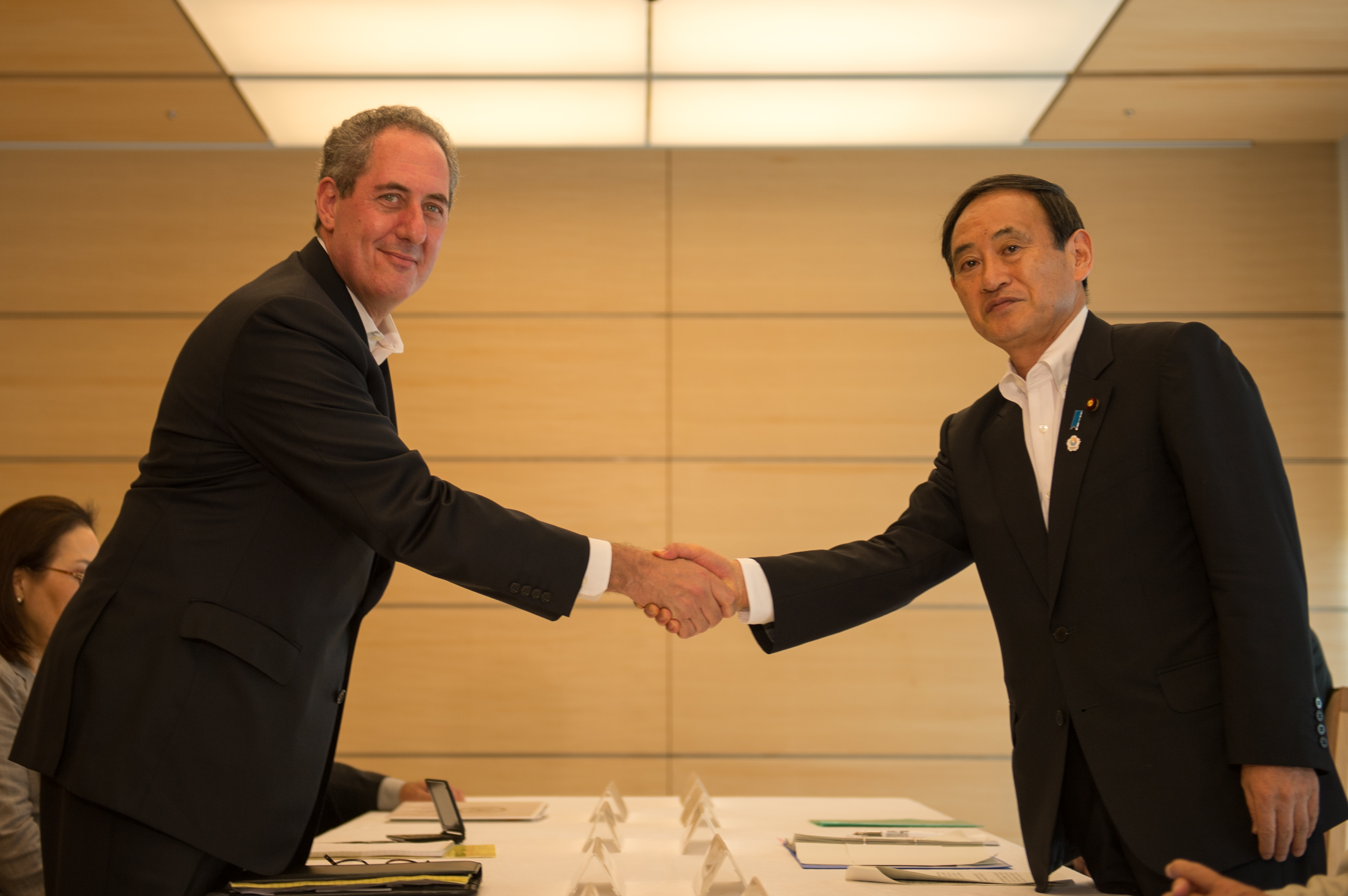
Suga (right) shaking hands with U.S. Trade Representative Michael Froman in 2013

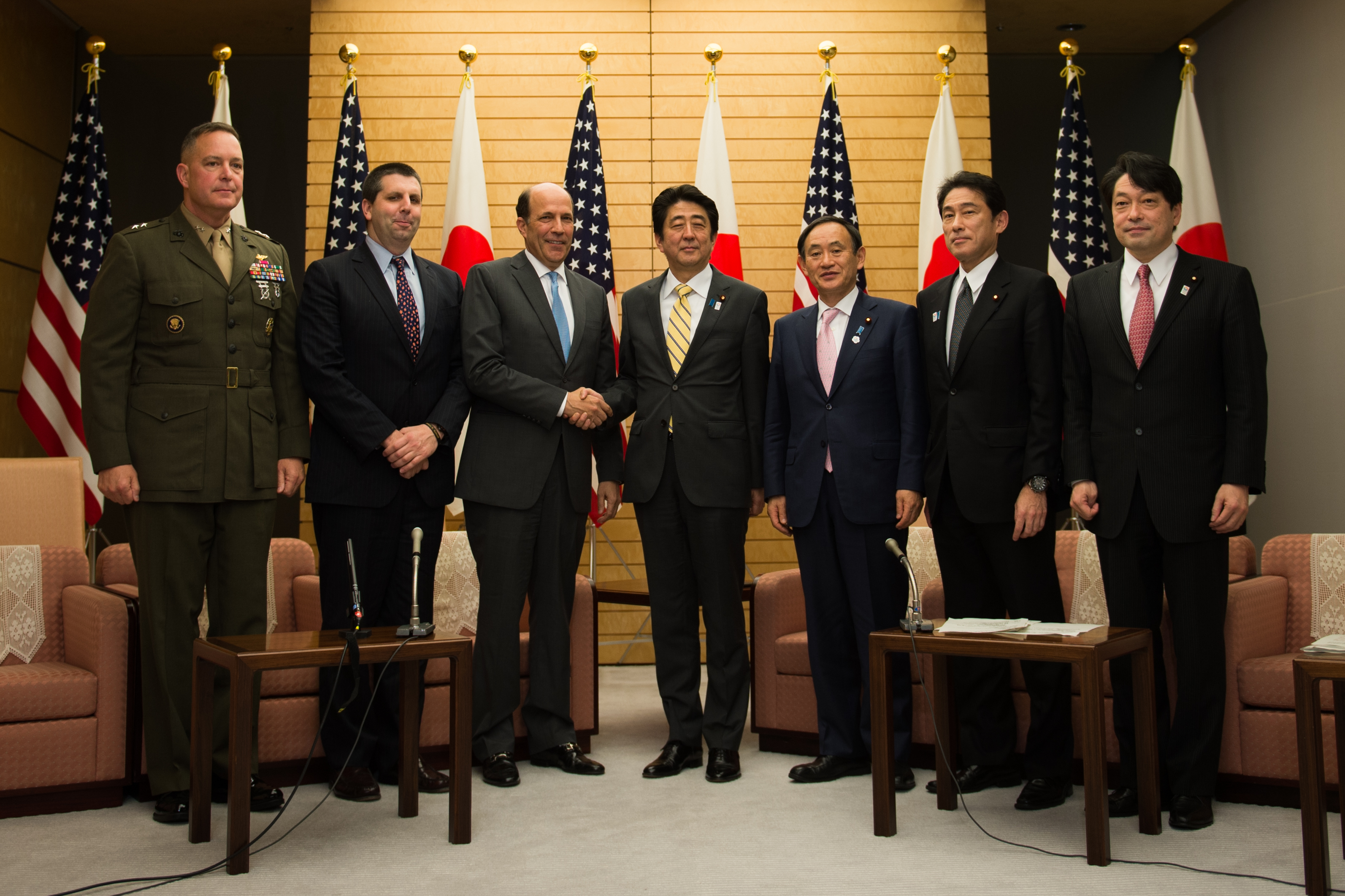
Suga (third from right) at the announcement of the Okinawa Consolidation Plan in 2013

Suga remained close to Shinzo Abe during the late 2000s and early 2010s, and urged Abe to run for the LDP presidency in 2012. Unlike many of Abe's other allies, Suga pushed Abe to focus on the economy rather than Abe's long-standing ambition to revise Article 9 of the Constitution, which prohibits Japan from using a military as means of settling international disputes.

Following Abe's victory in the 2012 general election, Suga was appointed Chief Cabinet Secretary in the second Abe cabinet in December 2012. In September 2014, he was given the additional portfolio of Minister in charge of Alleviating the Burden of the Bases in Okinawa. Suga and Tarō Asō were the only members of the December 2012 cabinet who remained in the cabinet as of November 2019. Suga is by far the longest-serving Chief Cabinet Secretary in Japanese history, serving his post for a total of 2,820 days; the second longest-serving Chief Cabinet Secretary, Yasuo Fukuda, served for a total of 1,289 days, less than half as long as Suga.

As Chief Cabinet Secretary, Suga served as an aide and advisor to Abe, and took an active managerial role in the government. He had a key role in the government's initiatives to attract tourists and foreign workers and reduce mobile telephone rates. He formed a team to reexamine the lead-up to the Kono Statement of 1993 but the group was soon after disbanded without ever reaching a consensus. He was affiliated with ultranationalist and far-right organisation, Nippon Kaigi. Under Abe, Suga overcame party resistance to implement a visa program that opened the doors for unskilled foreign workers, a shift from the previous policy, which centered on internship programs that often confined foreign workers to low-paying jobs. He was also supportive of the aggressive measures by the Bank of Japan to counter deflation. In 2015, he was criticized for publicly encouraging Japanese women to "contribute to their country by feeling like they want to have more children". He continued to hold his seat in the 2014 general election and 2017 general election.

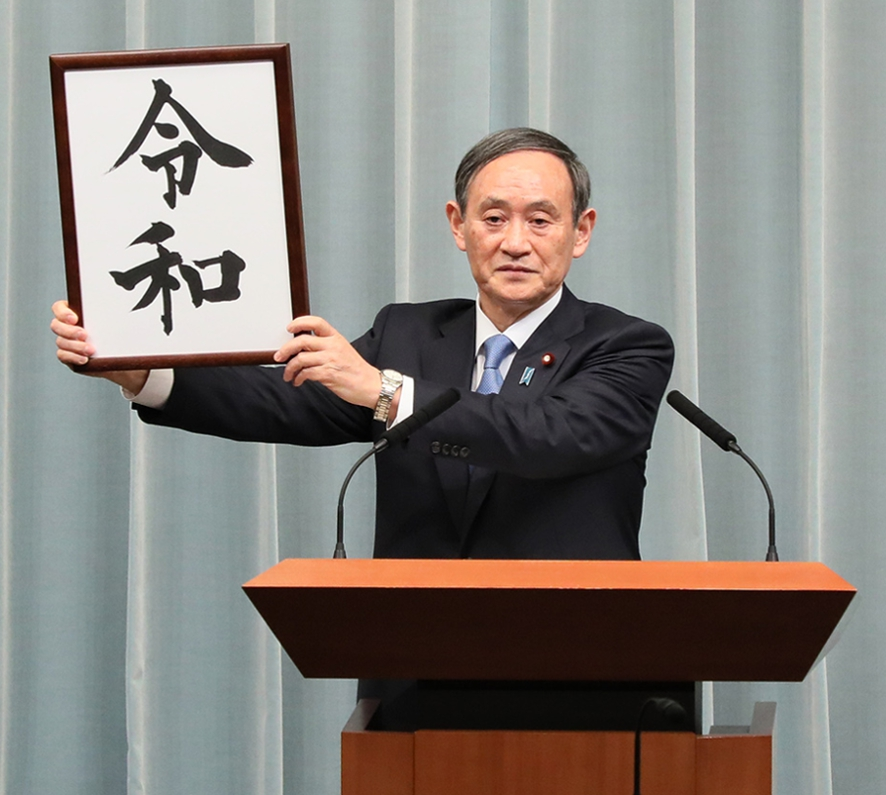
Suga announcing the new Japanese era name "Reiwa" on 1 April 2019

Suga gained domestic and international fame when he announced the name of the new imperial era, Reiwa, on 1 April 2019, earning him the nickname "Uncle Reiwa" (Reiwa Ojisan). While he had previously been a low-profile member of the government, this honor gave him an instant surge in name recognition and led more LDP lawmakers to view him as a viable candidate for party leadership. He was sent to Washington in May 2019 for a meeting with U.S. Vice President Mike Pence and other senior officials, fueling speculation that he was being groomed to serve as Abe's successor. Suga faced scrutiny later that year due to the resignations of Cabinet ministers Katsuyuki Kawai and Isshu Sugawara, both of whom had been close associates of Suga and were accused of campaign financing violations. Suga also remained politically active during this time, coordinating support for the LDP candidate in the 2019 Hokkaido gubernatorial election, a role typically reserved for top LDP officials. Suga served as a key Abe deputy during the country's response to the COVID-19 pandemic in 2020. He criticized the structure of the Japanese bureaucracy, with deep divisions between ministries, as stalling coordination to stop the spread of the virus.

== Premiership (2020–2021) ==
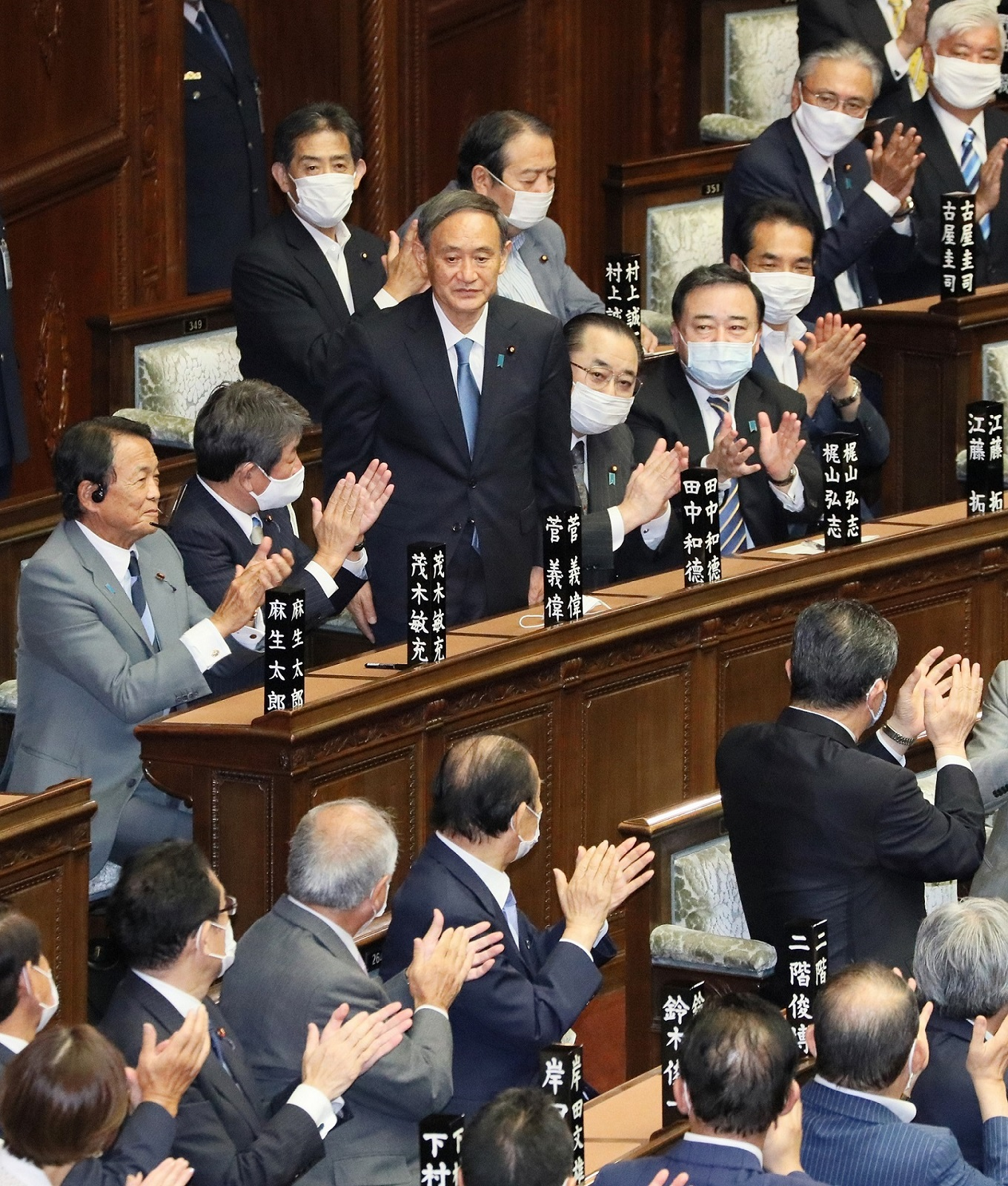
Suga is elected by the Diet, 16 September 2020.

Following Shinzo Abe's resignation announcement in August 2020 due to his ulcerative colitis, Suga emerged as the leading contender to replace Abe on the leadership election, having gained the support of Deputy Prime Minister Tarō Asō and LDP Secretary-General Toshihiro Nikai, as well as the two largest factions in the LDP and supposedly even Abe himself. Suga's main competitors in the LDP leadership race were longtime Abe rival Shigeru Ishiba and LDP policy chief Fumio Kishida.

Suga was elected to the presidency of the Liberal Democratic Party on 14 September 2020, with 377 votes out of a total of 534.

Upon his election, Suga outlined a policy agenda that included tackling the ongoing pandemic and implementing further deregulation to revitalize the economy. He reiterated his past interest in consolidating regional banks and lowering mobile phone charges in Japan. Suga vowed to continue the economic policies of his predecessor, known as Abenomics, and to continue the path of Shinzo Abe in terms of foreign policy, making his "top priority" the issue of Japanese citizens abducted by North Korea, as well as continuing to seek constitutional revision, including a new clause to Article 9 of the Japanese Constitution legitimizing the existence of Japan Self-Defense Forces. He and his cabinet were sworn in on 16 September 2020.

At the first press conference as the prime minister, Suga officially stated that his premiership will focus first on responding to the COVID-19 pandemic, the second on protecting employment and ensuring businesses in savior economic conditions, the third on continuing the Abenomics for economic revival, and the fourth on digital transformation and the review of supply chains.

=== Foreign policy ===
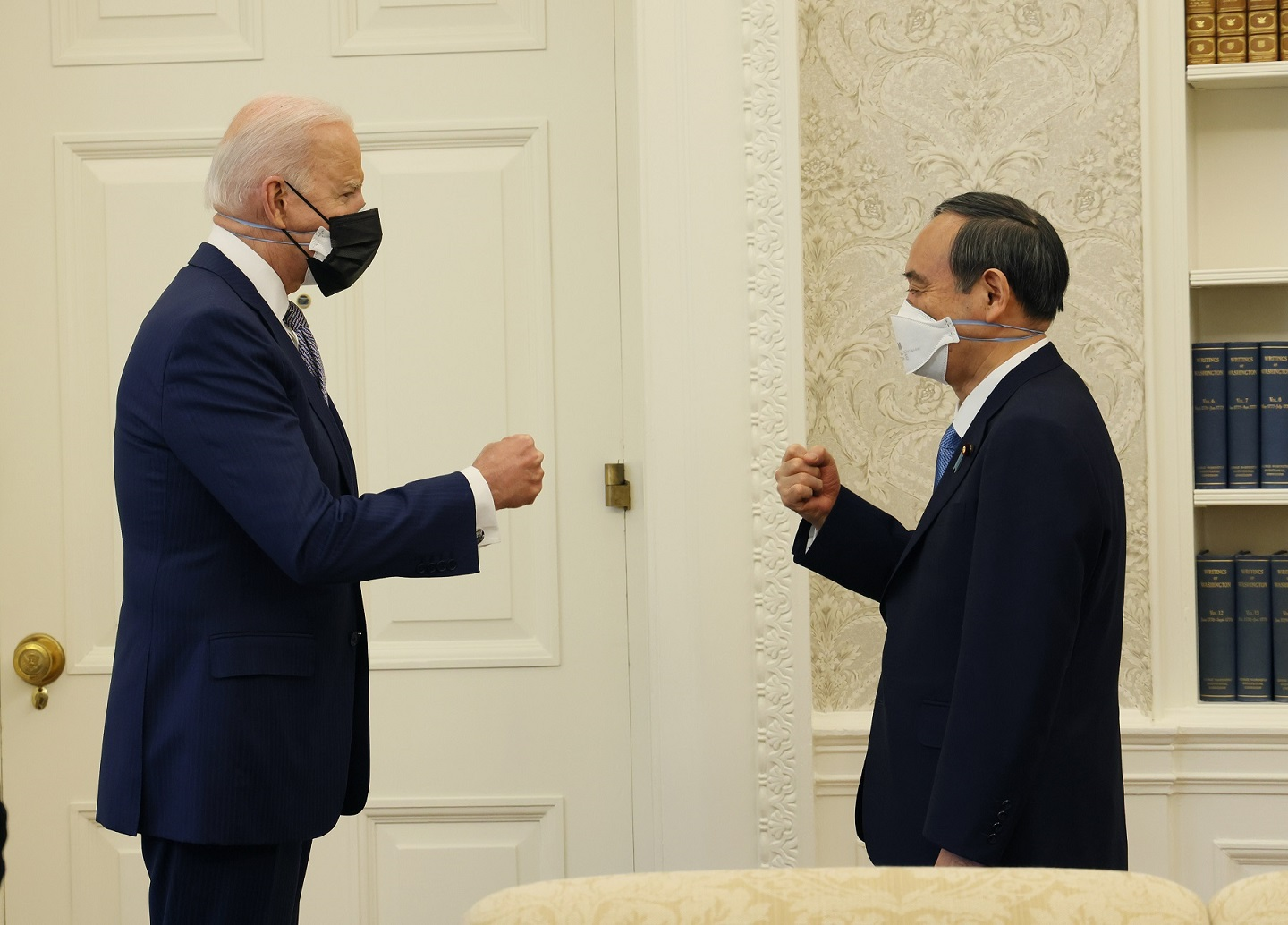
Suga meets with U.S. President Joe Biden at the Oval Office of the White House during Suga's visit to Washington D.C., 16 April 2021

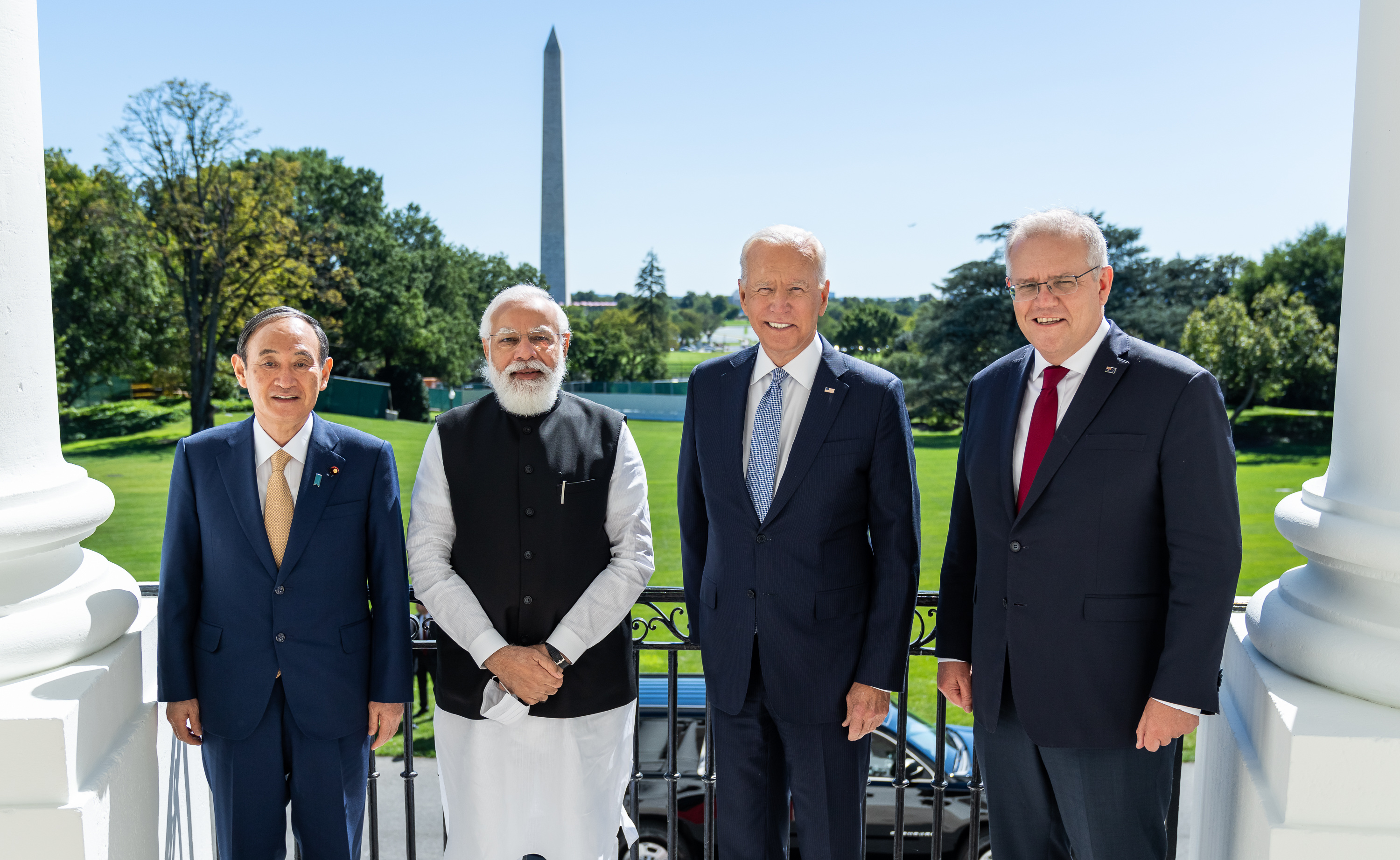
Suga with Quad leaders in September 2021

In October 2020, Suga made his first trips abroad to Vietnam and Indonesia, with analysts saying that he chose those two countries amid the growing tensions between one of its closest allies, the United States, and China. Suga has also committed to stronger ties with US President Joe Biden to discuss the US-Japan security alliance, the COVID-19 pandemic and climate change. In particular, Suga considered attending a global climate summit proposed by Biden in a push to bring nations in line with Japan's goal of becoming carbon neutral by 2050. Suga has made previous environmental commitments, such as a ¥2 trillion fund to promote research into decarbonization technologies and the setting of specific goals at the 26th United Nations Climate Change Conference of the Parties in the UK in November 2021. They have also agreed to work towards complete denuclearization of North Korea. Suga flew to the United States to meet with President Joe Biden in April 2021. Suga was the first foreign leader to visit Biden at the White House. Suga has also vowed to fight Chinese influence in the Pacific region. In July 2021, he held a remote meeting with Pacific nations leaders and pledged 3 million COVID-19 vaccines in an effort to counter Chinese influence. The move was supported by the United States.

=== COVID-19 response ===
In his 2021 New Year's address, Suga pledged to bring COVID-19 under control and to push forward with preparations for the 2020 Tokyo Olympics and Paralympics, which had been postponed due to the COVID-19 pandemic.

Suga implemented the GoTo stimulus program, which provides steep discounts for domestic travel in response to the economic consequences of the pandemic. By stimulating demand for tourism, it was aimed at boosting regional economies and helping hotels and airlines. However, it was suspended in December 2020 after criticism that it helped spread the virus and conflicted with the government's message for avoiding unnecessary travel. This was after Suga denied considering a halt to the campaign to focus on improving the economy.

Suga has received criticism for his handling of the COVID-19 pandemic. His attendance at an expensive steak dinner for eight, which included several celebrities and politicians and had happened after his decision to suspend "GoTo Travel", was deprecated by the public; all attendees were over 70, a high-risk age group for the virus. At the time, the government was advising people to avoid dining in groups of more than five. Suga has subsequently apologized.

In January 2021, Suga declared a state of emergency in the Greater Tokyo Area and the three surrounding prefectures, which was Japan's first such declaration since April 2020. The emergency included restrictions on daily life, with remote work encouraged and residents being urged to avoid non-essential outings; however, schools remained open. While the state of emergency carries no legal power, Suga has stated the government will consider amending the law to allow local authorities to penalize businesses that do not comply with official requests. Suga also pledged to provide up to ¥1.8 million per month to each restaurant that complies with a request to shorten its operating hours.

=== Approval rating ===
Suga's cabinet has seen fluctuating approval since Abe's resignation. The cabinet's approval rating dropped from 74 percent in September 2020 to 42 percent in January 2021. Shigeru Omi, the COVID-19 task force chief, said that this was due to Suga's GoTo promotions. It has also been attributed to his rejection of scholars on a science advisory panel. The drop in approval for Suga's cabinet proved the largest since October 2010, following the Senkaku boat collision incident. Approval bounced from 38 percent in February to 42 percent in March 2021. The cabinet's approval hit a record low in May 2021, hitting 33 percent after having again dropped to 40 percent the previous month. Amidst rising coronavirus cases in the community in the Greater Tokyo area, Suga's approval rating dwindled to a record lows of 31% in July and 28% in August while hosting the Tokyo 2020 Olympic Games during a pandemic. In an election widely seen as a referendum on the ruling LDP's Coronavirus response, the candidate that Suga endorsed lost the Yokohama mayoral race in August by a considerable margin putting considerable pressure on Suga's reelection chances in the upcoming national election, as an MP representing Kanagawa.

=== Resignation ===
On 3 September 2021, Suga announced that he would not seek re-election as the head of its governing party. This announcement followed his approval ratings being at an all-time low (below 30% in recent polls) as the nation struggled with its worst wave of COVID-19 infections ahead of the general election that year. His resignation would become effective on 30 September 2021, a day after the Liberal Democratic leadership election. Suga's announcement came at a press conference where a LDP leadership reshuffle was to be announced; although Suga had reportedly been fully intent on running as of the day before, both Shinzo Abe and Taro Aso refused to cooperate further with Suga's leadership in conversations on the evening of the 2nd, leading to Suga's surprise announcement the next morning.

On 29 September 2021, the LDP elected former foreign minister Fumio Kishida as new leader of the party and virtually making the prime minister-designate of Japan. Kishida replaced Suga on 4 October 2021.

== Retirement ==
Suga continued to represent the Kanagawa 2nd district constituency after stepping down from his role as prime minister. On 16 January 2026, multiple media outlets reported that Suga would not run in an anticipated snap election that was likely to be called by then-prime minister Sanae Takaichi, instead deciding to retire from public office. He officially announced plans for his retirement to reporters in Yokohama the next day. Suga said that he had considered the timing of his retirement since turning 70, and would give way to the next generation.

== Personal life ==
Suga is married and has three sons. His wife, Mariko, is the sister of one of his former co-workers in the office of Hikosaburo Okonogi. His eldest son, Seigoh, is the former director of Tohokushinsha Film (discharged on Feb. 2021).

Suga has a daily fitness routine that includes doing 100 situps and 40 minutes of walking each morning, and 100 situps each night. He started this routine after a doctor advised him to lose weight, and he lost 14 kg (31 lb) in four months. He is also known as a voracious reader, and is known for reading all major newspapers daily despite his busy schedule.

Suga practiced karate when he was a college student. He holds the third dan black belt.

Suga is known to have a sweet tooth. His favorite food is pancakes. His lunch is almost always soba. He neither smokes nor drinks.

== Election history ==
Election	Age	District	Political party	Number of votes	election results
1996 Japanese general election	47	Kanagawa 2nd district	LDP	70,459	winning
2000 Japanese general election	51	Kanagawa 2nd district	LDP	95,960	winning
2003 Japanese general election	54	Kanagawa 2nd district	LDP	115,495	winning
2005 Japanese general election	56	Kanagawa 2nd district	LDP	160,111	winning
2009 Japanese general election	60	Kanagawa 2nd district	LDP	132,270	winning
2012 Japanese general election	64	Kanagawa 2nd district	LDP	138,040	winning
2014 Japanese general election	66	Kanagawa 2nd district	LDP	147,084	winning
2017 Japanese general election	68	Kanagawa 2nd district	LDP	123,218	winning
2021 Japanese general election	72	Kanagawa 2nd district	LDP	146,166	winning
2024 Japanese general election	75	Kanagawa 2nd district	LDP	119,548	winning

== See also ==
- Tohokushinsha Film and Ministry of Internal Affairs and Communications scandal

House of Representatives (Japan)
New constituency	Representative for Kanagawa's 2nd district 1996–2026	Succeeded by Shōbun Nitta
Political offices
Preceded by Heizō Takenaka	Minister of Internal Affairs and Communications; 2006–2007	Succeeded by Hiroya Masuda
Preceded by Osamu Fujimura	Chief Cabinet Secretary; 2012–2020	Succeeded by Katsunobu Katō
Preceded by Shinzo Abe	Prime Minister of Japan; 2020–2021	Succeeded by Fumio Kishida
Party political offices
Preceded by Eisuke Mori	Chief of the Organisation and Movement Headquarters, Liberal Democratic Party; 2011–2012	Succeeded by Wataru Takeshita
Preceded by Ryotaro Tanose	Executive Acting Secretary General, Liberal Democratic Party; 2012	Succeeded by Hiroyuki Hosoda
Preceded by Shinzo Abe	President of the Liberal Democratic Party; 2020–2021	Succeeded by Fumio Kishida
Preceded by Tarō Asō	Vice President of the Liberal Democratic Party; 2024–2025	Succeeded by Tarō Asō
