= Uno Stacko =

Board game

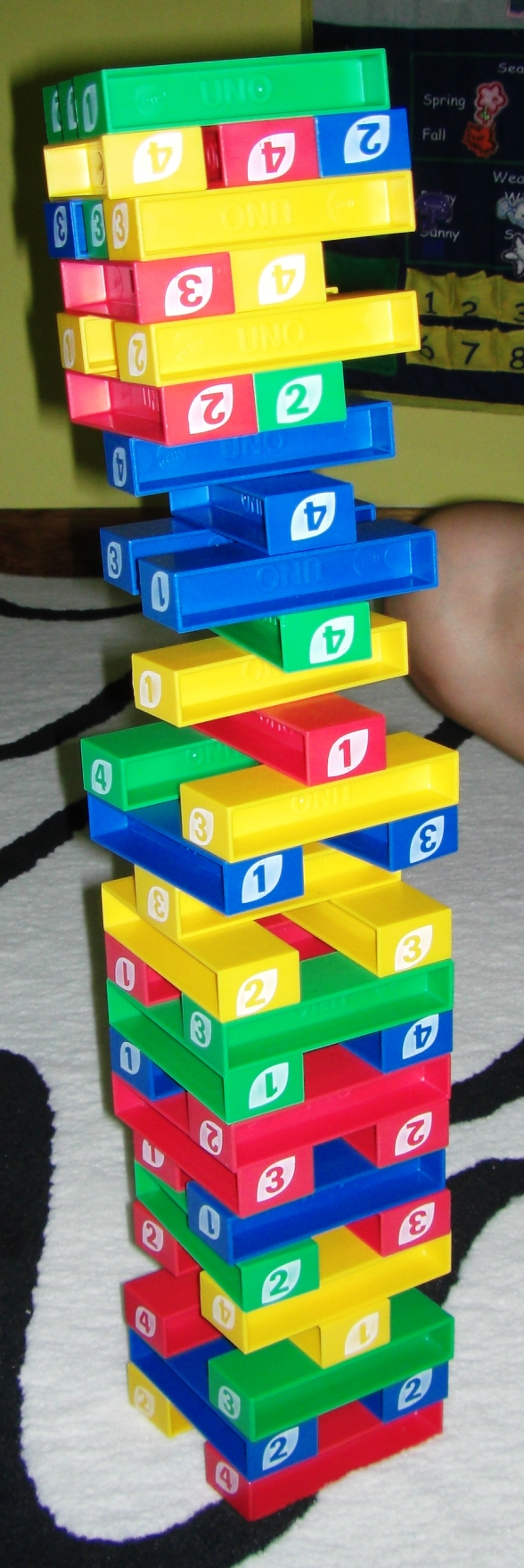
A stack of blocks, ready to topple over.

UNO Stacko is one of the many variations of the card game Uno. This game is a block-stacking tower game which combines the gameplay of Uno and that of Jenga. There are two versions of the game: the earlier version requires the use of a dice, while later versions eliminate the dice, making the game play closer to Jenga.

== Gameplay ==
Uno Stacko is played in a similar style to Jenga. There are 45 Uno Stacko blocks in each set, typically made of plastic and are colored red, yellow, green, blue and violet. Earlier versions of the game have the blocks numbered 1 to 4, while later versions added blocks bearing the Draw Two, Reverse, and Skip symbols. Later versions also include purple Wild blocks, which serve the same purpose as the Wild and Wild Draw Four cards in the parent game. Unlike Jenga blocks however, they look like hollow girders, making the tower more unstable as the game progresses. The earlier versions of Uno Stacko include a dice, called the Uno Cube, the faces of which bear the following:

- Red 1
- Blue 2
- Green 3
- Yellow 4
- Reverse
- Draw Two

When a colored number turns up, the player pulls a block having the same color or number as the side indicated. For instance, if a player rolls Yellow 4, the player must pull a block which is either yellow or bears the number 4. When "Reverse" turns up, the direction of play is reversed. "Draw Two" forces the player to pull any two blocks and place them on the top of the tower.

Later versions of the game eliminate the Uno Cube. As a result, when a player pulls a block and places it on the top of the tower, the color and number or symbol of that block determines what color or number or symbol of the block the next player should pull out. While the "Reverse" and "Draw Two" blocks serve the same purpose as their respective counterpart faces in the Uno Cube, the Skip blocks pass the play to the player next to the next player. When a Purple Wild block is pulled by a player, that player names the color of the block the next player should pull out.

As in Jenga, the game ends when the tower collapses and the person whose last move did not cause the collapse wins.
