= Uno (given name) =

- Gender: male
- Languages: Old Norse, Latin
- Name day: 14 August (Sweden); 1 January (Estonia)

Other names
- Related names: Uuno

Uno is a Swedish, Finnish and Estonian male given name, which is derived from the Old Norse name Une. Uno can also be seen as derived from the Latin word unus (one).

== People with the given name Uno ==
- Uno Aava (born 1928), Estonian racing driver and sports historian
- Uno Åhrén (1897–1977), Swedish architect
- Uno Berg (1909–2001), Swedish sports shooter
- Uno Cygnaeus (1810–1888), Finnish clergyman and educator
- Uno Henning (1895–1970), Swedish actor
- Uno Hilden (1890–1951), Finnish politician
- Uno Kajak (1933–2019), Estonian skier
- Uno Källe (1931–2009), Estonian competitive runner
- Uno Kaskpeit (born 1957), Estonian politician
- Uno Laht (1924–2008), Estonian writer
- Uno Lamm (1904–1989), Swedish electrical engineer and inventor
- Uno Laur (born 1961), Estonian singer (Röövel Ööbik)
- Uno Loop (1930–2021), Estonian singer, musician, athlete, actor and educator
- Uno Mereste (1928–2009), Estonian economist and politician
- Uno Naissoo (1928–1980), Estonian composer and musician
- Uno Öhrlund (born 1937), Swedish ice hockey player
- Uno Palu (1933–2024), Estonian decathlete
- Uno Piir (1929–2025), Estonian footballer and coach
- Uno Prii (1924–2000), Estonian-born Canadian architect
- Uno Röndahl (1924–2011), Swedish author
- Uno Svenningsson (born 1959), Swedish pop singer
- Uno Tölpus (1928–1964), Estonian architect
- Uno von Troil (1746–1803), Swedish Archbishop of Uppsala from 1786 to 1803
- Uno Troili (1815–1875), Swedish portrait painter
- Uno Ugandi (1931–2020), Estonian physician and politician
- Uno Ullberg (1879–1944), Finnish architect
- Uno Vallman (1913–2004), Swedish painter
- Uno Willers (1911–1980), Swedish librarian

== See also ==
- Uno (surname)
- Uno (disambiguation)
- Uuno
