= Uno (1999 video game) =

1999 video game

- Developer: HotGen
- Publisher: Mattel Interactive
- Series: Uno
- Platform: Game Boy Color
- Release: 16 December 1999
- Genre: Card game video game
- Modes: Single-player, multiplayer

Uno is a 1999 video game developed by HotGen and published by Mattel for the Game Boy Color. It is based on the card game of the same name.

== Gameplay ==
Similar to the card game, the aim of Uno is to remove all cards from the player's hand from a starting hand of seven. Each turn, players play a card from their hand and must match the number or symbol of the card on the top of the pile. Players select between one to three opponents and select their difficulty levels. Three special cards are included additional to the card game: Boomerang, All Draw 2, and Swap Hands. Uno features a multiplayer feature for players with a Game Link Cable and a second copy of the game.

== Reception ==
Reception

Review scores
Publication	Score
AllGame	4/5
Eurogamer	8/10
Daily Radar	Hit
Total Game Boy	75%

Allgame considered Uno offered everything a player could want from a virtual version of the card game, praising the graphics as "faithfully reproduced" and "clear and easy to see". Total Game Boy felt the game was "refreshing" and "well thought-out", writing that the addition of variations helped sustain interested. Eurogamer praised Uno as highly addictive and easier to play than the card game, praising the different game modes as "entertaining", although viewing the timing on calling "uno" on the player's final card as too short to feel fair. However, several critics felt the addition of an animated card was irritating and did not do much to enhance the game.
