= Uno Flip! =

Card game produced by Mattel

- Type: Shedding-type
- Players: 2–10 players
- Skills: Hand management
- Age range: 7+
- Cards: 112
- Playing time: Varies

Uno Flip! (/ˈuːnoʊ/; from Italian and Spanish for 'one') is a shedding-style card game variant where players compete to be the first to play all cards in their hand, scoring points for cards remaining in opponents' hands. Unlike the original Uno, the game utilizes a unique double-sided deck featuring a Light side (or "Mild" side) and a Dark side (or "Wild" side). It incorporates traditional gameplay along with standard penalties, such as drawing two cards for failing to call "Uno" or facing challenges when Wild Draw Two or Wild Draw Color cards are played, with individual hands ending when a player goes out until someone reaches the 500-point winning threshold. The two-sided design defines UNO Flip!, changing each round whenever a Flip card is played. Players must watch both sides of their cards and adapt their strategy as the match progresses. Beyond the original tabletop edition, the franchise has expanded into themed collaboration sets including Transformers, Marvel, and Stranger Things. Its iconic double-sided mechanics have also influenced similar party card games, such as UNO Flex and UNO Show 'Em No Mercy.

== Gameplay ==
As in the original Uno, the goal of Uno Flip! is to be the first to play all the cards in one's hand, scoring points for the cards still held by others.

Unlike the original Uno, in which only one side of each card is relevant to gameplay, in Uno Flip! the cards are all two-sided, consisting of the Light side (also known as the "Mild" side) with white fonts and borders and the Dark side (also known as the "Wild" side) with black fonts and borders. Only one side is in play at any given time, starting with the Light side at the beginning of each new hand. Each side has its own set of four colors, action and Wild cards, and number cards from 1 through 9.

Both sides contain two "Flip" cards in each of their respective colors. Whenever a Flip is played, both the stockpile and the discard pile are immediately turned over and all players must turn their hands around to play the other side of their cards.

=== The Light Side ===
The colors for this side are red, blue, yellow, and green. The action cards for this side have lighter effects, and they are as follows:

- Draw One: Next player in turn order draws one card and loses a turn.
- Skip: Next player in turn order loses a turn.
- Reverse: Switches the order of play (clockwise to counterclockwise, and vice versa).
- Wild: Player names the next color. May be used on any turn.
- Wild Draw Two: Player names the next color to be matched; next player in turn order draws two cards and loses a turn. May only be used if the player has no cards of the current color.
- Flip: Switches all cards from Light to Dark.

=== The Dark Side ===
The colors for this side are teal, orange, pink, and purple. The action cards for this side have stronger effects, and they are as follows:

- Draw Five: Next player in turn order draws five cards and loses a turn.
- Skip Everyone: Grants an extra turn.
- Reverse: Same as the Light side.
- Wild: Same as the Light side.
- Wild Draw Color: Player names the next color to be matched; next player in turn order must draw cards until they get one of that color, after which they lose a turn. May only be used if the player has no cards of the current color.
- Flip: Switches all cards from Dark to Light.

== Penalties ==
A player who fails to call "Uno" after playing their next-to-last card and is caught by another player before the next player in sequence ends their turn must draw two cards as a penalty.

When a Wild Draw Two or Wild Draw Color is played, the next player in sequence may challenge its use if they believe the player who played the card could have played a card of the previous matching color. The challenged player must then show their cards privately. If the challenge is valid, the challenged player must draw the cards, otherwise the challenger must draw them, plus two more as a penalty.

== Scoring ==
When one player uses their last card, they have "gone out" and the hand is over. That player scores points for all cards held by opponents as follows:

- Number cards: Face value
- Draw One: 10 points
- Draw Five, Reverse, Skip, Flip: 20 points
- Skip Everyone: 30 points
- Wild: 40 points
- Wild Draw Two: 50 points
- Wild Draw Color: 60 points

Points are scored based on the side that is in play after the last card is laid down. If a player goes out by using any card that requires the next player to draw, that player must draw the appropriate number of cards before the scores are tallied.

The first player to score 500 points wins the game.

== Official collaboration decks ==
Mattel has released several licensed editions of Uno Flip! themed after film and television properties, including Marvel, Stranger Things, and Transformers.

=== UNO Flip! Marvel ===
Released in 2021, the Marvel edition features characters from Marvel to represent the game's dual sides. The Light Side features characters such as Captain America, Spider-Man and Iron Man, while the Dark Side features villains like Thanos, Loki and Hela.

=== UNO Flip! Stranger Things ===
Launched in 2022, this edition draws inspiration from the Netflix series Stranger Things. The Light Side reflects characters from Hawkins, Indiana, whereas the Dark Side shifts into The Upside Down dimension,featuring monsters such as the Demogorgon.

=== UNO Flip! Transformers ===
Released in 2023, the Transformers collaboration features the conflict between the franchise's factions. The Light Side represents the Autobots through bright colors, while the Dark Side represents the Decepticons using darker colors.

== Official video game (DLC) ==
Mattel collaborated with Ubisoft to create an official Uno video game. The Uno Flip! DLC was released on March 17, 2020, and is available on platforms including Steam, PlayStation, and Xbox. The digital adaptation introduces mechanics such as the "Flip" card, which allows players to transition to a new set of colors, numbers, and action cards.

Uno Flip! added more action cards that can affect the gameplay compared to the original Uno. The main addition is the "Flip" card, which transitions the deck to the other side of the game. There are two types of "Flip" cards: the "Light side of Flip" card and the "Dark side of Flip" card. The Dark Side of Uno Flip! has stricter penalties with the "Draw Five" and "Wild Draw Color" cards. The "Draw Five" card forces the next player to draw another five cards and skip their turn; meanwhile, the "Wild Draw Color" card forces the next player to continuously draw until they pull a card of the color chosen by the player. The "Wild Draw Color" card can only be played legally if the player does not have a card matching the current color in play. If another player suspects a bluff, they can challenge the move. If the player is found guilty, they must draw cards until they pull a card of the chosen color. However, if the player is innocent, the challenger must draw cards until they pull the chosen color, plus an additional two penalty cards.

The video game version is a duplicate of the physical card game, but the mechanics are automatic. Physically, when "Flip" cards are played, the player manually flips their cards; meanwhile, in the digital version, cards are automatically flipped with a digital animation to the Dark Side. Moreover, the animations and the mechanics are displayed with visual effects and sound effects when an opponent plays "Draw Five", "Skip Everyone", or "Wild" cards.The DLC brings this tabletop variation into a digital format while keeping its flip mechanic. Instead of physically turning cards, players see the game switch sides on screen, making the change easier to follow in online or local matches.

In addition to standard automated rules, the digital adaptation incorporates online multiplayer matchmaking alongside local couch play. Players can customize matches using traditional custom "House Rules"—such as card stacking or 7-0 rules—in combination with the Uno Flip! double-sided deck mechanics. The expansion was also featured as part of bundled releases, including the Uno Ultimate Edition.

== Similar games ==
Several other matching card games share key features with Uno Flip!, such as dual-sided cards, higher penalties, or classic color-matching rules.

The main goal of the game in Uno Flex is to be the first player to discard every card from one's hand. At the start of the match, participants place their Power Cards with the green checkmark side active. Flex Cards are designed with two distinct sides: a primary regular side and an alternative flex side. Players can only use a card's flex effect if their Power Card shows green. This dual-sided structure functions similarly to Uno Flip!, as both games feature cards with two playable sides.

In UNO Show 'Em No Mercy, players win either by discarding all held cards or by eliminating all opponents. Playing a Wild Draw 10 card forces the next player to draw ten cards and skip their turn. Players can stack penalty cards of equal or higher value to pass the extra cards to the next person. Participants accumulating 25 or more cards are automatically eliminated from the match. This mechanics relate to Uno Flip! through the inclusion of increased draw penalties and player restriction actions.

In Crazy Eights, the primary goal of the game is to be the first participant to shed every card. Unused cards are stacked in the center of the playing area to form a draw deck. Cards can be discarded if they match the color or rank displayed on top of the pile. Playing an eight card allows the player to choose the active color for the following turn. These basic suit-changing rules form the core framework used in Uno Flip! and other shedding games.

== Reception ==
On Board Game Geek, the game scored 6.6 out of 10. A digital adaptation also received "generally positive reviews", according to the review aggregator platform Metacritic.
