= Uno Rush =

2009 video game

- Developer: Carbonated Games
- Publisher: Microsoft Game Studios
- Platform: Xbox 360 (XBLA)
- Release: March 25, 2009
- Genre: Card game
- Modes: Single-player, Multiplayer

Uno Rush is an Xbox Live Arcade game based on the Uno card game. The game was expected to be released alongside the New Xbox Experience, showcasing the game's functionality of the Xbox 360 Avatars, but was delayed for various reasons. Uno Rush was released on March 25, 2009 as part of Xbox Live's "Days of Arcade" promotion.

== See also ==
- Uno (video game)
