= Merle Robbins =

American inventor of the card game UNO

Merlin "Merle" Robbins (September 12, 1911 – January 14, 1984) was an American barber from Reading, Ohio, who invented the card game UNO. In 1971, he invented UNO to resolve an argument with his son Ray, a teacher, about the rules of Crazy Eights. The original decks were designed and made on the family dining room table. He and his family mortgaged their home to raise $8,000 and created the first 5,000 UNO decks to sell. At first, he sold them from his barber shop, while his son Ray gave them away to his students. In 1972, he sold the rights to UNO to International Games for $50,000 plus royalties of 10 cents per game.

Toy giant Mattel produces the game in 80 countries and, by 2006, had sold over 150 million copies worldwide. Robbins died in 1984 in Cincinnati, Ohio. He was 72.
