= Uuno =

Male given name

Uuno is a Finnish and Estonian male given name, and may refer to:

== People ==
- Uuno Brander (1870-1934), Finnish agronomist and politician
- Uuno Hannula (1891-1963), Finnish journalist and politician
- Uuno Johannes Kekkonen (1910-162), Finnish businessman and brother of president Urho Kekkonen
- Uuno Kailas (1901–1933), Finnish poet, author, and translator
- Uuno Klami (1900–1961), Finnish composer
- Uuno Laakso (1896–1956), Finnish actor
- Uuno Öpik (1926-2005), Estonian-British physicist

== Fictional characters ==
- Uuno Turhapuro, Finnish comedy character created by Spede Pasanen and played by Vesa-Matti Loiri

== Other ==
- Raadio Uuno, Estonian radio station

== See also ==
- Uno (given name)
