= Uno (video game) =

Video game adaptation of the card game

- Cover of Ubisoft's Uno
- Developers: Carbonated Games (XBLA); Gameloft; Ubisoft Chengdu (Xbox One, Xbox Series X/S, PS4, PS5, Nintendo Switch, Windows, Stadia, Luna) (Note: Updated version developed by Snap Finger Click)
- Publishers: Microsoft Game Studios (XBLA); Gameloft; Ubisoft (Xbox One, Xbox Series X/S, PS4, PS5, Nintendo Switch, Windows, Stadia, Luna)
- Composer: Maxime Goulet (additional music)
- Series: Uno
- Engine: Unity (Ubisoft)
- Platforms: Xbox 360: WiiWare; DSiWare; PlayStation 3; PlayStation Portable; iPhone OS; iPod; Symbian^3; Android; Xbox One; Xbox Series X/S; PlayStation 4; PlayStation 5; Nintendo Switch; Microsoft Windows; Google Stadia; Amazon Luna
- Release: May 9, 2006: Xbox 360; May 9, 2006; iOS; November 14, 2008; PS3; October 1, 2009; PSP; April 22, 2010; WiiWare; JP: October 20, 2009; PAL: November 6, 2009; NA: January 25, 2010; DSiWare; PAL: November 20, 2009; JP: December 9, 2009; NA: December 21, 2009; PlayStation 4, Xbox One; August 16, 2016; Microsoft Windows; December 8, 2016; Nintendo Switch; November 7, 2017; Stadia; September 15, 2020; Amazon Luna; December 10, 2020; PlayStation 5, Xbox Series; November 2, 2023
- Genre: Digital tabletop
- Modes: Single-player, multiplayer

Uno is a digital tabletop video game based on the card game of the same name. It has been released for a number of platforms. The Xbox 360 version by Carbonated Games and Microsoft Game Studios was released on May 9, 2006, as a digital download via Xbox Live Arcade. A version for iPhone OS and iPod devices was released in 2008 by Gameloft. Gameloft released the PlayStation 3 version on October 1, 2009, and also released a version for WiiWare, Nintendo DSi via DSiWare, and PlayStation Portable. An updated version developed by Ubisoft Chengdu and published by Ubisoft was released for the PlayStation 4 and Xbox One in August 2016, Microsoft Windows in December 2016 and for the Nintendo Switch in November 2017.

Uno's original version was well received by critics. A sequel to the game's original version, Uno Rush, was announced at E3 2008 and released in 2009.

== Gameplay ==
Uno is a video game that takes similarities to the card game of the same name. For the official rules, see the rules of the physical version.

=== Differences between versions ===
==== Xbox 360 version ====
Screenshot of Uno on Xbox 360

The Xbox 360 version of the game offers three different game modes including Standard Uno, Partner Uno, and House Rules Uno. In Partner Uno, players sitting across from each other join forces to form a team, so that a win by either player is a win for the team. In House Rules Uno, the rules can be tweaked and customized to the player's preference.

The Xbox 360 version of Uno offers multiplayer for up to four players through Xbox Live. Players can join or drop-out of in-progress games at any time, with computer players automatically taking over for any missing humans. The game supports the Xbox Live Vision camera, allowing opponents to view an image of the player (or whatever the camera is pointed at) while playing the game.

===== Theme decks =====
The Xbox 360 version of Uno supports downloadable content through the Xbox Live Marketplace. This content takes the form of custom theme decks, which feature new visual appearances, sound effects, and game rules. Decks available for download from the Xbox Live Marketplace include:

- Project Gotham Racing Uno: In this deck, the cards feature pictures of the cars seen in the Project Gotham Racing series of video games. The rule changes include a card called the "Gotham Live" card, which is based on the replay feature in Project Gotham Racing 3. This card allows a player to look at the hand of any of the other players as well as functioning as a normal wild card.
- Kameo: Elements of Power Uno: A custom deck with artwork from Kameo: Elements of Power. In addition, a special play card allows a player to swap his or her entire hand with the hand of any other player in the game.
- Uno 35th Anniversary: A special deck made to celebrate the 35th Anniversary of the first edition of Uno released in the United States in 1971. In this deck, there are specialty "35" cards. If a "35" card is played, only a 3 or 5 of any color can be played.
- Super Street Fighter II Turbo HD Remix: This deck commemorates the release of Super Street Fighter II Turbo HD Remix, it only has one background and one music track. Additionally, a new card named "Hadouken" was added. When played, the targeted player must draw cards until they get a Skip or a Reverse card.

==== Gameloft versions ====
The iPod version by Gameloft features a 15-round progressive career mode that introduces and unlocks special rule changes as the player progresses through the game.

The WiiWare version, as well as the DSiWare version, supported online play via the discontinued Nintendo Wi-Fi Connection, as well as Wii Speak support in the WiiWare version.

Gameloft also developed the J2ME versions of the original game and Uno Spin.

Gameloft developed and published Uno & Friends first in 2012 as an offline J2ME version, and in 2013 as an online experience on Facebook and other platforms. The Facebook version of the game was discontinued in 2017.

==== Ubisoft version ====
The Ubisoft version of the game, which is available for Xbox One, Xbox Series X/S, PlayStation 4, PlayStation 5, Microsoft Windows, Nintendo Switch, Stadia, and Luna has two different modes; Standard Play, which is a standard four-player game of Uno; and a 2v2 Mode where one can partner up with another player. Both of these modes support online play. This version also has six different house rules that can be combined.

===== House Rules in Ubisoft Uno =====
In addition to the standard rules, the game includes several toggleable house rules that can be combined in a match:

- Stacking: When a player plays a Draw Two or Wild Draw Four card, the next player may play a card of the same type to add to the draw penalty and pass it to the next player in sequence.
- 7–0: Playing a 7 allows a player to swap hands with an opponent of their choice, while playing a 0 requires all players to pass their hands to the next player in the current direction of play.
- Jump-In: A player holding a card identical in color and number or symbol to the top discard may play it immediately out of turn (requires a Ubisoft Connect account).
- Force Play: If a player draws a playable card from the deck, they must play it immediately.
- No Bluffing: Wild Draw Four cards can be played freely without the risk of being challenged.
- Draw to Match: If a player has no playable cards, they must continue drawing from the deck until they draw a playable card.

On October 21, 2025, Ubisoft added two additional house rules:

- Skip n' Flip: A player may play a matching-color Skip or Reverse card on a Draw card to pass or redirect the draw penalty to another player.
- Draw & Play: A player may play a card on the same turn after drawing cards from the deck or taking a draw penalty.

===== Theme decks =====
In addition to the regular Uno deck, there are also custom theme decks including new visual appearances, sound effects, and game rules. Most of them are available by downloadable content either individually or as an Ultimate Edition bundle. These include:

- Uno Winter Theme: This is purely cosmetic and adds a winter theme to the backdrop while still retaining the original Uno card deck. This pack is available as separate free DLC and is included in the Ultimate Edition.
- Uno Rabbids: A custom deck starring the Raving Rabbids, this deck has four unique cards (Comin' Through, Explosive Results, Hurry Up!, and Wild Blue Yonder). This pack is included with the base game and is included in the Ultimate Edition.
- Uno Just Dance: A custom deck based on Just Dance 2017, this deck has four unique cards (Cross-Fade, Hot Number, Get Down, and Just Dance Machine). This pack is available as separate paid DLC and is included in the Ultimate Edition.
- Uno Rayman: A custom deck based on the Rayman series of games, this deck has four unique cards (Dragon, Punching Things, Escape, and A Little Help). This pack is available as separate paid DLC and is included in the Ultimate Edition.
- Uno Flip!: A custom deck featuring double-sided cards and different action cards (Draw 5, Skip Everyone, Wild Draw Color, and Flip) based on the physical card game of the same name introduced by Mattel in 2019. This pack is available as separate paid DLC and is included in the Legacy and Ultimate Editions.
- Uno Fenyx's Quest: A custom deck based on Immortals Fenyx Rising, this deck has two unique action cards (Typhon's Trick and Fenyx Power), 4 passive abilities based on the cursed gods (Hephaistos, Athena, Aphrodite, and Ares), and Typhon's Curse which forces you to draw one if you don't discard a cursed card. This pack is available as separate paid DLC and is included in the Ultimate Edition.
- Uno 50th Anniversary: A custom deck to celebrate UNO's 50th Anniversary, this deck has black cards with the numbers and symbols as the color of the card, and has a Wild 50/50 card that when played the person picks 2 players to assign to heads or tails (50 or UNO logo), then a coin flip starts, the loser of the coin flip has to draw 4 cards (just like a Wild +4 card played). This pack is available as separate paid DLC and is included in the Legacy and Ultimate Editions.
- Uno The Call Of Yara: A custom deck based on Far Cry 6 with characters from the game and a special Wild Guerrilla Radio card which helps or hinders the players when played. This pack is available as separate paid DLC.
- Uno Valhalla: A custom deck based on Assassin's Creed Valhalla with characters from the game, dueling, and an added board game element where you collect resources. This pack is available as separate paid DLC.
- Uno Show 'Em No Mercy: A custom deck featuring extremely brutal and punishing action cards (Skip Everyone, Wild Reverse Draw Four, Wild Draw Six, Wild Draw Ten, Wild Color Roulette) and a stern rule where if you have 25 cards or more, you are instantly eliminated. Based on the physical card game of the same name introduced by Mattel in 2023.

==== Mattel163 version ====
The Mattel163 version of the game is a new mobile version of the tabletop game UNO Cards.

This version has the following 4 modes: the classic mode, 2 Vs 2 mode, custom room mode, go wild mode. The game can be played on IOS, Android, and Facebook H5 pages. The first Closed beta test of UNO! Mobile started in Canada via Google Play Store on 6 February 2018. Before the soft launch of UNO! Mobile on mid-2018, it took the studio about 12 months to take the game into vast players. The development process of UNO! Mobile was done by Mattel 163 and supported by ThunderFire UX team.

== Development and release ==
=== Original version ===
The Xbox 360 version was also included as a download code in the Xbox Live Vision bundle and on disc in the Xbox Live Arcade Compilation Disc.

=== Ubisoft version ===
An updated version developed by Ubisoft Chengdu and published by Ubisoft was released for Xbox One and PlayStation 4 in August 2016, with a Steam version to follow later in the year. On November 7, 2017, Uno was released for the Nintendo Switch. The game was also released for the Stadia cloud gaming service, operated by Google, on September 15, 2020. A version for Amazon Luna followed on December 10, 2020.

== Reception ==
Reception

Aggregate scores
Aggregator	Score
GameRankings	Xbox 360: 82%
Metacritic	Xbox 360: 81/100; PS4: 71/100; Xbox One: 57/100; Switch: 69/100

Review scores
Publication	Score
Eurogamer	8/10 (UK) (Note: Original version); 8/10 (Italy) (Note: Ubisoft version)
GameSpot	8.1/10
GamesRadar+	4/5
IGN	7.7/10
Nintendo Life	WiiWare: 6/10; DSiWare: 7/10; Switch: 7/10
Official Xbox Magazine (US)	8.0/10
TeamXbox	8.0/10

Award
Publication	Award
GameSpot	Best Downloadable Console Game in 2006

Uno's original version was well received by critics. It holds an 82% average review score on the now defunct review aggregator website GameRankings. On Metacritic, it holds an 81 score out of 100, based on critic reviews, and indicating "generally favorable reviews". However, its Ubisoft version received mixed reviews from critics, with the PlayStation 4 version receiving a 71 out of 100 score, based on 11 critic reviews, the Xbox One version receiving a 57 out of 100 score, based on 8 critic reviews, and the Nintendo Switch version receiving a 69 out of 100 score, based on 7 critic reviews, with both them indicating "mixed or average reviews".

=== Sales ===
On March 27, 2007, Microsoft declared Uno to be the first Xbox Live Arcade game to exceed one million downloads. As of 2011, the game sold at least 2.068 million copies.
