= Uno Spin =

Card game

- UNO Spin Box
- Origin: UNO (card game)
- Designer: Janice Ritter
- Publisher: Mattel, Inc
- Release date: 2005
- Players: 2–10
- Age range: 7+
- Cards: 112

Uno Spin is a variation of the popular Mattel card game Uno, with a wheel containing numerous game alterations. Unlike in Uno, 20 "spin" cards can be played to make other players spin the wheel. The game marketing uses the slogan "The next revolution of the classic card game." The game was designed by Janice Ritter and released in 2005. Gameloft made a video game adaptation in 2010.

== The Wheel ==
When a player plays a "spin" card, the next player must spin the provided wheel, instead of taking a normal turn, which holds the "draw" and "discard" deck. The method of spinning is not governed.

=== Spin Areas ===
Below is the list of actions on the wheel, going clockwise, with the arrow pointing at 6 o'clock or south.

Uno Spin
All players must try to shout "Uno Spin" first. The player who shouts first gets to discard any one card, even if it cannot be usually played.
Discard Colour (shown as green cards on the spinner)
The player should discard any or all cards of the same color on the discard pile. Even if the player only has one card left, they win. Although not specifically stated in the official rules, in this instance, wildcards may not be discarded. The topmost card triggers its special actions if it is an Action card, and matching continues with this card.
Draw Blue
The player should draw as many cards as necessary until a blue card or wild card is drawn. All cards drawn are kept, including the final card.
Draw Red
The player should draw as many cards as necessary until a red card or wild card is drawn. All cards drawn are kept, including the final card.
War
Players have to place their highest numbered card to win. If two or more players have shown the same card, they must show their second highest card. The person who shows the highest card may put it down no matter what card is on the discard pile. If the war winner reveals more than one card, they play them all.
Discard Number (shown as # on the spinner)
The player should discard all cards of the same number on the discard pile. The topmost card is the next to match.
Show Hand
The player must publicly show their hand to other players.
Trade Hands
Players must trade their entire hands to the left once.
Almost "Uno"
The player must discard all but two cards, regardless of color and numbers shown, on the discard pile.

The spin cards have white patches on the number. Spin cards are only from number cards 1 to 5.

== See also ==
- Uno (card game)
- Uno Attack
