= Shōbun Nitta =

Japanese politician

- 新田 章文
- Nitta in 2026

Member of the House of Representatives
- Incumbent
- Assumed office 9 February 2026
- Preceded by: Yoshihide Suga
- Constituency: Kanagawa 2nd

Personal details
- Born: 20 May 1981 (age 45) Osaka, Osaka Prefecture, Japan
- Party: Liberal Democratic
- Education: Doshisha University
- Website: Shōbun Nitta website

Shōbun Nitta (新田 章文, Nitta Shōbun; born 20 May 1981) is a Japanese politician of the Liberal Democratic Party, who serves as a member of the House of Representatives.

== Early years ==
On 20 May 1981, Nitta was born in Osaka, Osaka Prefecture. He graduating from the Doshisha University's Faculty of Law. After working as a non-regular employee and a salaried worker, he joined Yoshihide Suga's office in 2006 and became his secretary.

On 16 September 2020, he was appointed as a secretary to the Prime Minister, a post he held until 1 January 2021. However, he was reappointed to the same position on 1 July of that year and continued to serve until Suga stepped down as Prime Minister on 4 October 2021.

== Political career ==
On 17 January 2026, Suga announced his retirement from politics. On 19 January, The LDP Kanagawa Prefectural Federation nominated Nitta as Suga's successor.

In the 2026 general election, Nitta won the Kanagawa 2nd seat.
