= Hikosaburo Okonogi =

Japanese politician

- 小此木 彦三郎
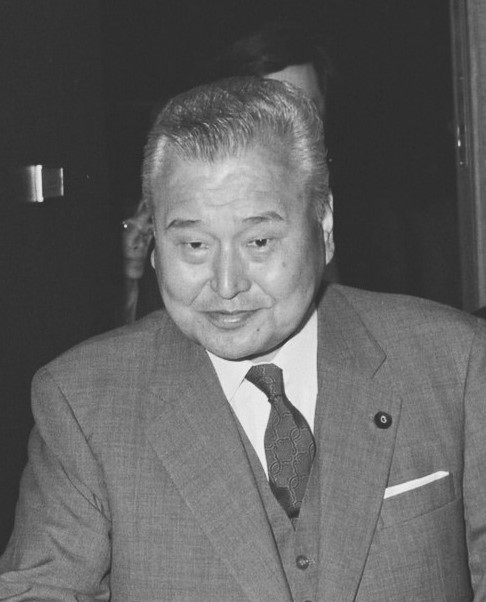
- Okonogi in 1984

Minister of Construction
- In office 27 December 1988 – 2 June 1989
- Prime Minister: Noboru Takeshita
- Preceded by: Ihei Ochi
- Succeeded by: Takeshi Noda

Minister of International Trade and Industry
- In office 27 December 1983 – 1 November 1984
- Prime Minister: Yasuhiro Nakasone
- Preceded by: Sosuke Uno
- Succeeded by: Keijiro Murata

Member of the House of Representatives
- In office 27 December 1969 – 4 November 1991
- Preceded by: Chiyozō Noma
- Succeeded by: Hachiro Okonogi
- Constituency: Kanagawa 1st

Personal details
- Born: 26 January 1928 Yokohama, Kanagawa, Japan
- Died: 4 November 1991 (aged 63) Minato, Tokyo, Japan
- Party: Liberal Democratic
- Children: Hachiro Okonogi
- Parent: Utaji Okonogi (father)
- Education: Waseda University

Hikosaburo Okonogi (小此木 彦三郎; 26 January 1928 – 4 November 1991) was a Japanese politician who served as a member of the House of Representatives from 1969 to 1991, as Minister of International Trade and Industry from 1983 to 1984, and as Minister of Construction from 1988 to 1989.

== Early life ==
Okonogi was born in a political family in Yokohama and graduated from Waseda University with a degree in philosophy.

== Political career ==
After serving on the Yokohama City Council, Okonogi was elected to the House of Representatives in the 1969 Japanese general election, and thereafter won seven more electoral victories. His Diet posts included Parliamentary Vice-Minister for Transportation, Parliamentary Vice-Minister for Foreign Affairs, and Chairman of the House of Representatives Transportation Committee. His first Cabinet post came in 1983 under Prime Minister Yasuhiro Nakasone, when he was appointed Minister of International Trade and Industry.

In 1991, Okonogi served as chairman of the House of Representatives special committee overseeing electoral reform legislation that would introduce proportional representation blocs in Japanese electoral districts. He called for the withdrawal of the bill in opposition to the wishes of incumbent Prime Minister Toshiki Kaifu; Kaifu thereafter resigned.

Future Prime Minister Yoshihide Suga served as Okonogi's aide from 1975 to 1987.

== Death ==
Okonogi died in office in November 1991 after a head injury sustained by falling down a staircase in the House of Representatives office building. His seat in the House of Representatives was thereafter assumed by his son, Hachiro Okonogi.
