= Uno, West Virginia =

Community in West Virginia, US

- Unincorporated community
- Location within West Virginia Location within the United States
- Coordinates: 37°37′43″N 81°44′13″W
- Country: United States
- State: West Virginia
- County: Wyoming
- Elevation: 1,178 ft (359 m)
- Time zone: UTC-5 (Eastern (EST))
  - Summer (DST): UTC-4 (EDT)
- Area codes: 304 & 681
- GNIS feature ID: 1555855

Uno is an unincorporated community in Wyoming County, West Virginia, United States. Uno is 7.5 miles (12.1 km) west-southwest of Oceana.

Uno was so named on account of the name's brevity.
