= Uno Attack =

Card game

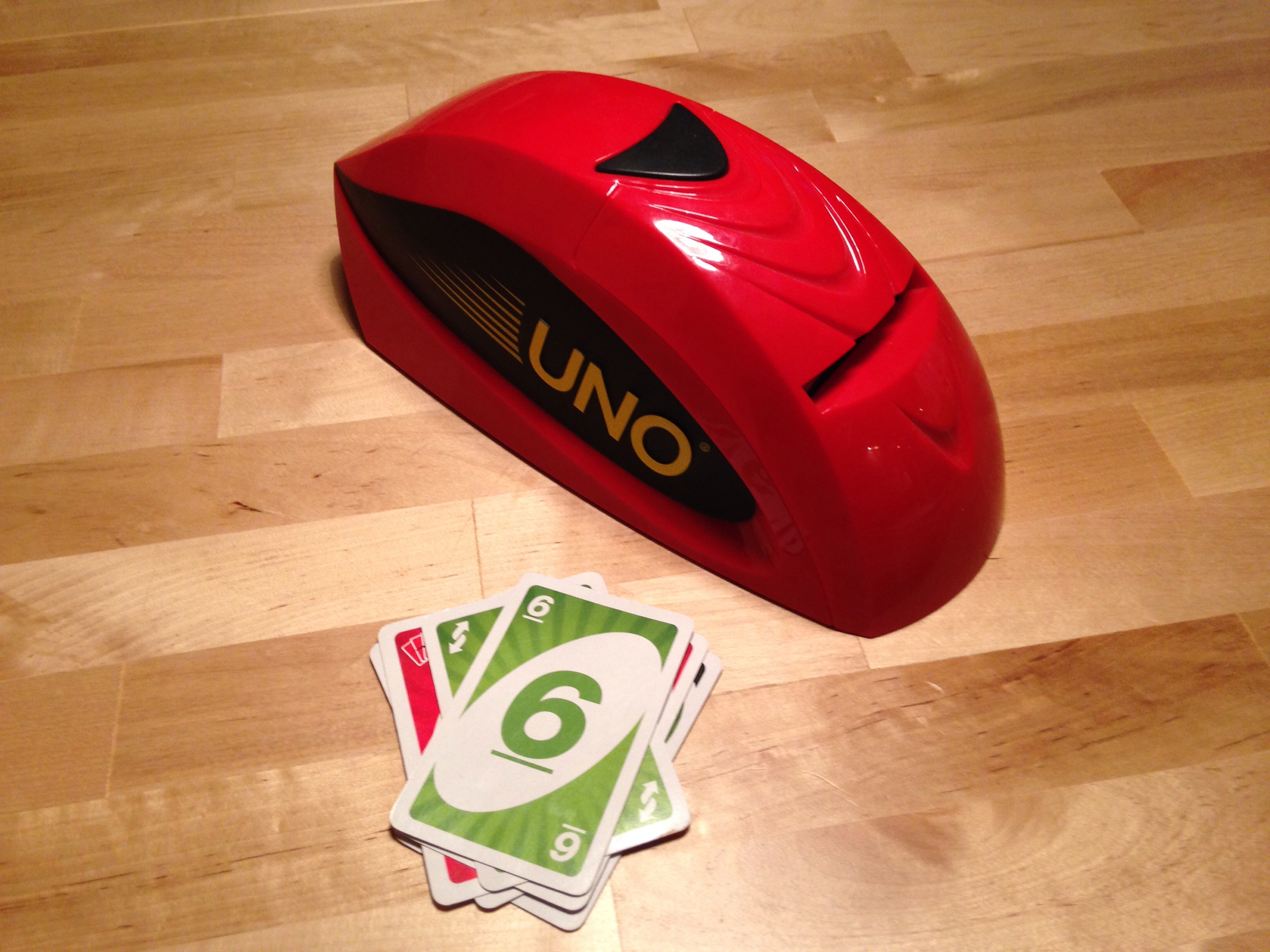
An Uno Attack machine and the associated cards

Uno Attack (called Uno Extreme in Germany; stylized as UNO Attack) is one of many variations of Mattel's popular Uno card game. It includes 112 (106 in the later versions) cards as well as a mechanical card launcher. It was released in 1998 with production overseen by Jeffrey Breslow.

The main difference between Uno Attack and the original Uno is that instead of drawing cards, players press a button on the card launcher, which shoots out a random number of cards at random times.

== Mechanical card launcher ==
Uno Attack comes with a special mechanical card launcher that runs on 3 C batteries. The card shooter contains a receptacle where the deck of cards is placed, and a button on the front, known as the "Launcher Button". When the rules call for a player to "Hit" the card shooter, the player presses the button on the card launcher. An electronic chime sounds, and a random number of cards shoot out. In some cases, the launcher may not shoot out anything when one presses the Launcher Button.

== Differences from original Uno ==
In Uno Attack, there are a number of differences to the original card game.

The gameplay differences are as follows:

- When a player does not have or does not want to play a playable card in the original game, they are forced to draw a card. Uno Attack's rules call for the player to press the Launcher button once instead.
- When a player plays their second-to-last card, thereby reducing their hand to one card, they must shout "uno". If they do not, and another player catches it before the next player takes a turn, they are forced to draw two penalty cards in the original game. Uno Attack, however, requires the player to press the Launcher button twice instead.
- Pressing the Launcher button any number of times ends a player's turn immediately, even if some cards drawn are playable.
- If any cards are left sticking out of the Launcher after cards are shot out, the player who pressed the Launcher button must take these cards into their hand with the ones that managed to clear the launcher.
- "Wild Draw Four" is replaced by "Wild Hit Fire" and "Wild All Hit", in which the player who played that card gets to choose the color. Hit Fire requires the next player to hit the launcher button until it fires, while All Hit requires everyone except whoever played the card to each press the Launcher button once.

== Cards ==
The cards included in the game are as follows:

- Two 1's, 2's, 3's, 4's, 5's, 6's, 7's, 8's, and 9's of each color (red, blue, green, and yellow).
- Two "Reverse"s of each color.
- Two "Skip"s of each color.
- Two "Hit 2"s of each color.
- One "Discard All" of each color.
- One "Trade Hands" of each color.
- Four "Wild"s.
- Two "Wild Hit-Fire"s.
- Two "Wild All Hit"s.

Here is what each card means in detail:

- Reverse - Simply reverse direction of play. Play left becomes play right, and vice versa.
- Skip - The next player to play loses their turn and is “skipped.”
- Wild Card - This card can be played on any card. The person playing the card calls any color to continue play, including the one presently being played if desired. A Wild card can be played even if the player has another playable card in their hand.
- Hit 2 - When this card is played, the next player must hit the Launcher button twice. Their turn is then over; play continues with the next player.
- Discard All - Play this card when a player wants to discard all of the cards in your hand of the same color. For example, if a yellow “7” is in the Discard pile, one may discard all the yellow cards in your hand, with a yellow Discard All card placed on top. (you may also discard a Discard All card on the top of another Discard All card.)
- Trade Hands - The player who plays this card will exchange all cards with the other player that they choose.
- Wild Hit-Fire - When this card is played the player calls a color, then the next player in the direction of play must press the Launcher button until the Launcher shoots out cards. The activating player adds the launched cards to their hand and forfeits their turn, then play continues as normal with the next player.
- Wild All Hit - The player who plays this card chooses the color and all other players must press the Launcher button.
