= Sōsuke Uno =

Prime Minister of Japan in 1989

- 宇野 宗佑
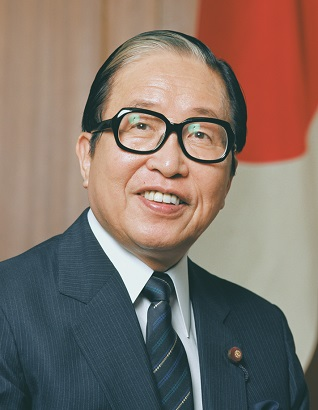
- Official portrait, 1989

Prime Minister of Japan
- In office 3 June 1989 – 10 August 1989
- Monarch: Akihito
- Preceded by: Noboru Takeshita
- Succeeded by: Toshiki Kaifu

President of the Liberal Democratic Party
- In office 2 June 1989 – 8 August 1989
- Secretary-General: Ryutaro Hashimoto
- Preceded by: Noboru Takeshita
- Succeeded by: Toshiki Kaifu
Ministerial offices
Minister for Foreign Affairs
In office 8 November 1987 – 3 June 1989
Prime Minister	Noboru Takeshita
Preceded by	Tadashi Kuranari
Succeeded by	Hiroshi Mitsuzuka
Minister of International Trade and Industry
In office 10 June 1983 – 27 November 1983
Prime Minister	Yasuhiro Nakasone
Preceded by	Sadanori Yamanaka
Succeeded by	Hikosaburo Okonogi
Director-General of the Administrative Management Agency
In office 9 November 1979 – 17 July 1980
Prime Minister	Masayoshi Ōhira
Preceded by	Motohiko Kanai
Succeeded by	Yasuhiro Nakasone
Director-General of the Science and Technology Agency
In office 24 December 1976 – 28 November 1977
Prime Minister	Takeo Fukuda
Preceded by	Masao Maeda
Succeeded by	Tasaburo Kumagai
Director-General of the Japan Defense Agency
In office 11 November 1974 – 9 December 1974
Prime Minister	Kakuei Tanaka
Preceded by	Sadanori Yamanaka
Succeeded by	Michita Sakata

Member of the House of Representatives
- In office 20 November 1960 – 20 October 1996
- Preceded by: Tsuruyo Tsutsumi
- Succeeded by: Constituency abolished
- Constituency: Shiga at-large

Member of the Shiga Prefectural Assembly
- In office 1951–1958

Personal details
- Born: 27 August 1922 Moriyama, Shiga, Empire of Japan
- Died: 19 May 1998 (aged 75) Moriyama, Shiga, Japan
- Party: Liberal Democratic
- Other political affiliations: Liberal (1945–1947); Democratic (1947–1950)
- Spouse: Chiyo Hirose (m. 1949)
- Relatives: Osamu Uno (son-in-law)
- Education: Kobe University of Commerce
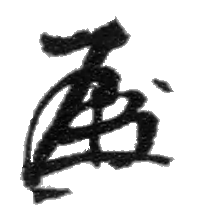
- Signature
- Military career
- Allegiance: Japan
- Branch: Imperial Japanese Army
- Service years: 1943–45
- Rank: Second Lieutenant
- Conflicts: Second World War; Soviet-Japanese War; Soviet invasion of Manchuria

Sōsuke Uno (宇野 宗佑, Uno Sōsuke; 27 August 1922 – 19 May 1998) was a former Japanese politician who served as prime minister of Japan in 1989.

Born in Shiga Prefecture, Uno enrolled in the Kobe College of Commerce before he was conscripted into the army during the Second World War. In 1960, he entered politics and was elected to the National Diet, becoming a leading Liberal Democratic Party member and a key ally of Yasuhiro Nakasone. Uno served as director of the Defense Agency under Kakuei Tanaka, as director of the Science and Technology Agency under Takeo Fukuda, and as director of the Administrative Management Agency under Masayoshi Ōhira.

He was briefly international trade and industry minister in 1983, and foreign minister in 1987–1989. In 1989, Uno became prime minister but served for only two months before he resigned after a poor showing in that year's upper house election, influenced by the lingering Recruit scandal and public financial scandal with an outspoken Geisha mistress.

== Early life and education ==
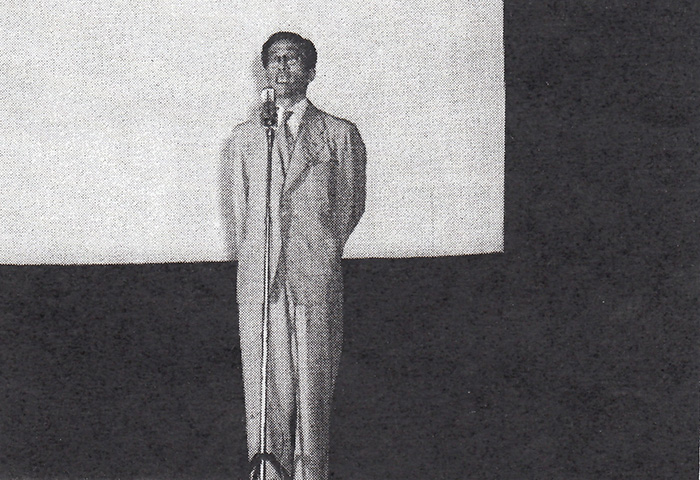
Sōsuke Uno (at the Daikokuza Theatre on 1952).

Uno was born in Moriyama, Shiga. His family owned a sake brewery called Arachō, and had served as town officials (Japanese: Toshiyori). The family had previously ran a hotel and a general store in his birth home.

In 1943, he graduated from Hikone Commercial College (later, Shiga University) where he led Hikone Commercial College to the national champion of Kendo among the commercial universities and colleges in Japan and attended the Kobe College of Commerce but had to leave the university two months later after the enrollment because he was called into the Imperial Japanese Army as an officer during World War II. After the war, he was sent to Siberia as a prisoner. He never came back to Kobe College of Commerce again. In 1949, he married Chiyo Hirose, a housewife and raised two daughters.

As well as a politician, Uno was an accomplished writer, who wrote a book considered classic in Japan about his experiences as a prisoner of war in Siberia.

== Political career ==
In 1960, he entered politics, winning election to the Diet of Japan. Six years later, he was promoted to Vice-Minister at the Ministry of International Trade and Industry, then similar positions with the Science and Technology Agency, then the Administrative Agency until earning his place in Cabinet as Minister for Trade and Industry and then Foreign Secretary until he was Prime Minister. As Foreign Secretary in conflicted times, he was applauded for his tact, navigating international demands for increased Japanese contributions to international commerce with stern loyalty to his own nation's interests.

In 1974, he served briefly as Director General of the Japan Defense Agency. As the Foreign Minister under then-Prime Minister Takeshita, Uno became the first Japanese Cabinet member to visit Israel since the 1973 oil crisis. Uno's career reached a peak in the most fraught times his party had seen, as he took the reins of his party after the Recruit Scandal, when 47 Japanese MPs (including mostly other members from his own Liberal Democrat Party) were found guilty of taking bribes and unfair trading. Of all prime-ministerial candidates, only Uno was free of blame from them, and he was given charge over the party, the government, and Japan. By this stage he had served his country for almost fifty years, and was placed in office on 3 June 1989.

== Premiership (1989) ==
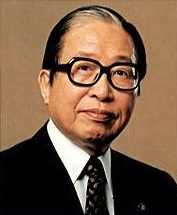
- Premiership of Sōsuke Uno; 3 June 1989 – 10 August 1989
- Monarch: Emperor Akihito
- Cabinet: Uno Cabinet
- Party: Liberal Democratic
- Seat: Naikaku Sōri Daijin Kantei
- Constituency: Shiga at-large
- Emblem of the Government of Japan

Uno proclaimed that his government followed the principle of "a slim government and an affluent people".

=== Economics ===
The economic policies of him and his successor are seen as part of the neoliberal cycle by Post keynesians.

=== Geisha affair ===
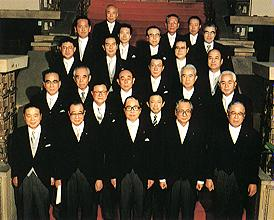
Uno with the Ministers of Uno Government (at the Prime Minister's Official Residence on 3 June 1989. )

Uno encountered public scandal in 1989, when accused by the Geisha entertainer Mitsuko Nakanishi of being "immoral" and ungenerous in his financial support during their four-month affair in 1986. Nakanishi would claim in following newspaper interviews that Uno had treated senior ranking geisha with arrogance and contempt, had not paid the appropriate fee of ¥300,000 per month (roughly US$2,100 at the time) for her company of four months, and had not provided a traditional parting gift (a further monetary fee) as had been customary in geisha etiquette.

A Washington Post article published on 19 July 1989 brought international attention to the affair, with some senior geisha denouncing Nakanishi as a whistleblower, effectively compromising the discreet nature of the profession and violated the traditionalist norms by engaging with political and economic affairs in the public sphere.

Nakanishi later quit the profession after she was vehemently criticized by the Geisha Gion Committee who began to shun her from further client engagements to avoid scandal. She later remarried another man and divorced, attended a Shingon Buddhist school temple in Shiga Prefecture, and held various secretarial jobs unrelated to the geisha community. Due to the severity of the scandal, Nakanishi's own son disowned her during this time.

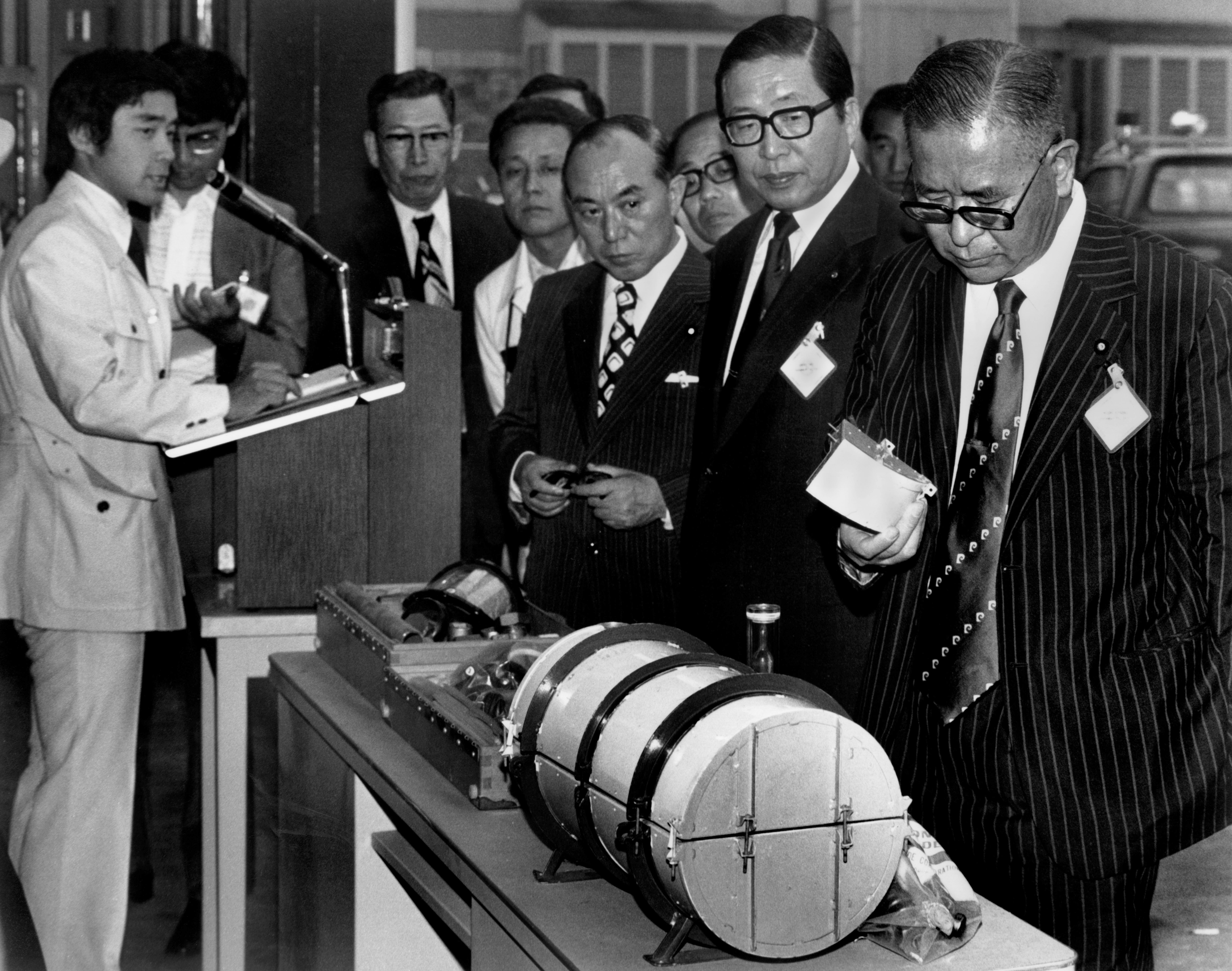
Sōsuke Uno (at the Energy Research and Development Administration on 14 September 1977).

Uno was highly criticized in public not for having a Geisha mistress, as it was a traditional leisure practice expected of politicians and wealthy men but instead due to relating his poor financial habits in the Japanese Diet as compared and paralleled to the ungenerosity towards his former Geisha mistress. Furthermore, the Geisha was outspoken in public and even made allegations and political suggestions in properly handling the Japanese economy, an unconventional behavior not expected of a traditionalist woman (Geisha culture) in which further exacerbated the situation.

To avoid further scandal, Sōsuke Uno resigned as prime minister on 10 August 1989 after just 68 days in office, but continued to serve his country in various government posts until he retired fully in 1996. On 29 April 1994, he was awarded with the highest possible honour for an ordinary civilian, the Grand Cordon of the Order of the Rising Sun with Paulownia Flowers.

== Death ==
At 72 years of age, Uno then enjoyed a peaceful retirement in Moriyama city. He died of lung cancer due to Tobacco use on 19 May 1998 in a hospital near his private home. He had two daughters from his wife, Mrs. Chiyo Hirose Uno. He published two collections of Haiku poems, as well as his book on prisonership in Siberia, along with painting, poetry, and music. A year later in 1999, his Geisha affair was highlighted in the Secret Life of Geisha, a TV documentary.

== Honours ==
- Grand Cordon of the Order of the Rising Sun with Paulownia Flowers - (29 April 1994)

Party political offices
Preceded by Noboru Takeshita	Head of the Youth Division, Liberal Democratic Party; 1963–1966	Succeeded by Toshiki Kaifu
Preceded by Masumi Esaki	Chairman of the Diet Affairs Committee, Liberal Democratic Party; 1974–1976	Succeeded by Toshiki Kaifu
Preceded by Noboru Takeshita	President of the Liberal Democratic Party; 1989	Succeeded by Toshiki Kaifu
Political offices
Preceded by Sadanori Yamanaka	Director General of the Japan Defense Agency; 1974	Succeeded by Michita Sakata
Preceded by Masao Maeda	Director General of the Science and Technology Agency; 1976–1977	Succeeded by Tasaburo Kumagai
Preceded by Motohiko Kanai	Director General of the Administrative Management Agency; 1979–1980	Succeeded by Yasuhiro Nakasone
Preceded by Sadanori Yamanaka	Minister of International Trade and Industry; 1983	Succeeded by Hikosaburo Okonogi
Preceded by Tadashi Kuranari	Minister of Foreign Affairs; 1987–1989	Succeeded by Hiroshi Mitsuzuka
Preceded by Noboru Takeshita	Prime Minister of Japan; 1989	Succeeded by Toshiki Kaifu
