= Uno (card game) =

Card game produced by Mattel

- Logo since 2016
- Designer: Merle Robbins
- Publisher: International Games (until 1992); Mattel (since 1992)
- Type: Shedding-type
- Players: 2–10 players
- Skills: Hand management
- Age range: 7+
- Cards: 112
- Playing time: Varies
- Chance: High

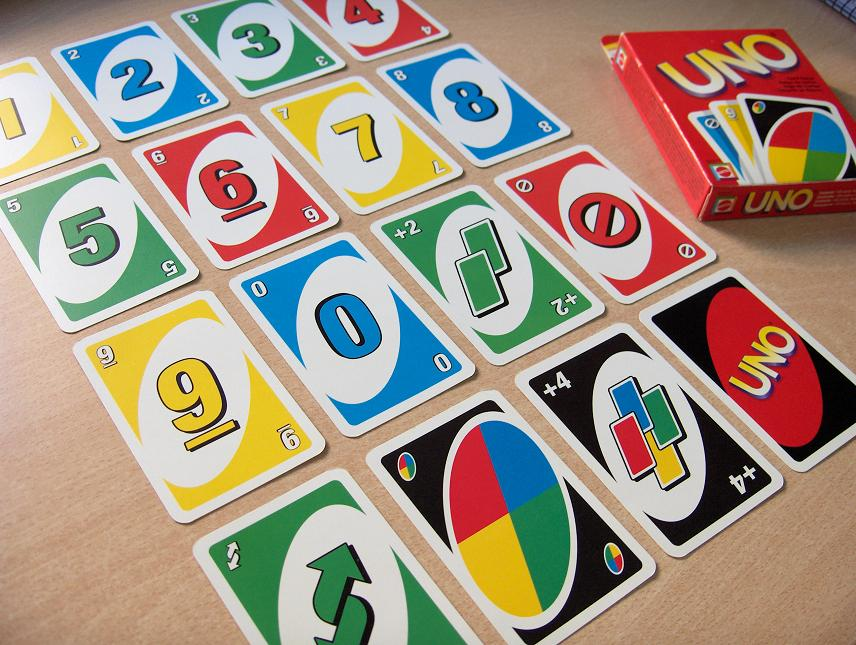
Old Uno cards

Uno (/ˈuːnoʊ/; from Spanish and Italian for 'one'), stylized in all caps as UNO, is a proprietary American shedding-type card game originally developed in 1971 by Merle Robbins in Reading, Ohio, a suburb of Cincinnati, that housed International Inc., a gaming company acquired by Mattel on January 23, 1992.

The game is played with a dedicated deck derived from the crazy eights family of card games which, in turn, is based on the traditional German game of mau-mau.

== History ==
The game was originally developed in 1971 by Merle Robbins in Reading, Ohio, a suburb of Cincinnati. When his family and friends began to play more and more, he and his family mortgaged their home to raise $8,000 to have 5,000 copies of the game made. He sold it from his barbershop at first, and local businesses began to sell it as well. Robbins later sold the rights to Uno to a group of friends headed by Robert Tezak, a funeral parlor owner in Joliet, Illinois, for $50,000 plus royalties of 10 cents per game. Tezak formed International Games, Inc., to market Uno, with offices behind his funeral parlor. The games were produced by Lewis Saltzman of Saltzman Printers in Maywood, Illinois.

In 1992, International Games became part of the Mattel family of companies.

In 2018, Uno was inducted into the National Toy Hall of Fame alongside pinball and the Magic 8 Ball. The Strong National Museum of Play also recognized the game for its fast pacing, wide age appeal, and enduring cultural impact as a staple of family entertainment.

In 2021, to celebrate the game's 50th anniversary, Mattel hosted the inaugural Uno Championship Series. The invitational tournament culminated in a grand finale at the HyperX Esports Arena in Las Vegas on November 11, 2021, where the first official Uno World Champion was crowned and awarded a $50,000 grand prize.

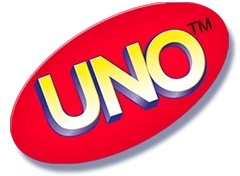
Logo used from 1997 to 2010

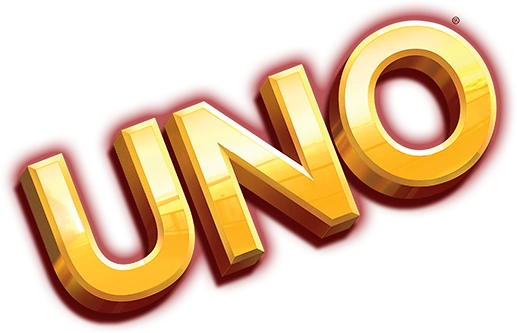
Logo used from 2010 to 2016

Logo used since 2016

== Official rules ==
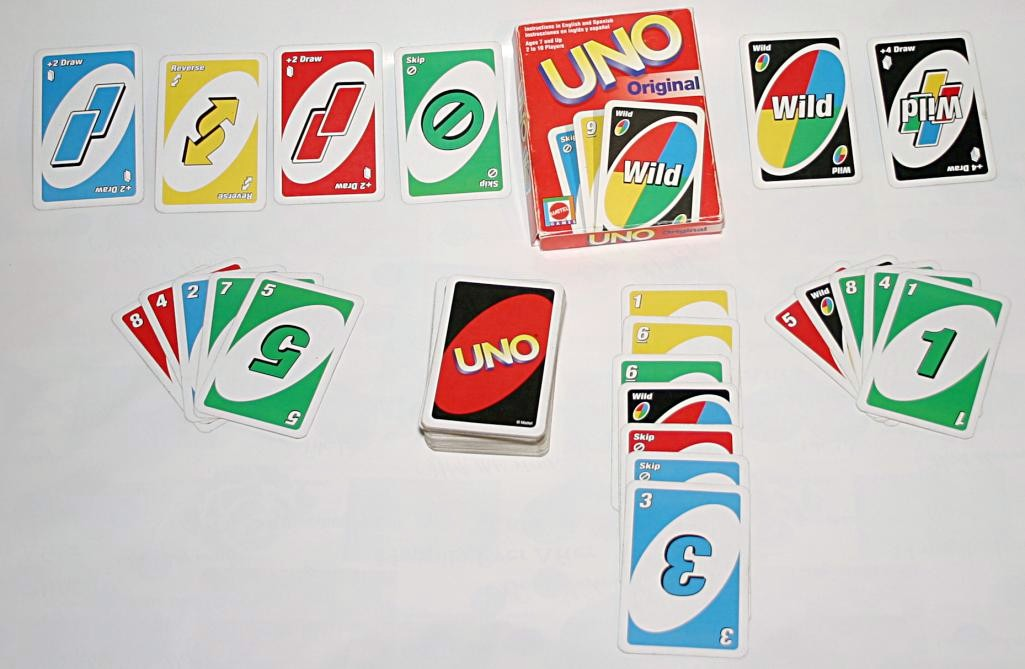
Uno cards

The aim of the game is to be the first player to play all of one's own cards. Prior to the 2022 rule changes, the official objective was to be the first player to score 500 points. This was achieved across multiple rounds; players scored points by being the first to play all their cards and received points for the cards still held by the other players. This format remains an optional way to play.

Uno includes 108 cards: 25 in each of four color suits (red, yellow, green, blue), each suit consisting of one zero, two each of 1 through 9, and two each of the action cards "Skip", "Draw Two", and "Reverse". The deck also contains four "Wild" cards and four "Wild Draw Four". Sets manufactured since 2015 include 112 cards, adding one "Wild Swap Hands" (2015–17) or "Wild Shuffle Hands" (since 2017) Wild Card and three customizable Wild cards.

Uno cards deck

For each hand, a dealer is determined by having each player randomly draw one card from the deck. The player with the highest number card deals, and all cards are reshuffled into the deck to begin the dealing.

To start a hand, seven cards are dealt to each player, and the top card of the remaining deck is flipped over and set aside to begin the discard pile. The player to the dealer's left plays first unless the first card on the discard pile is an action or Wild card (see below). On a player's turn, they must do one of the following:

- play one card matching the discard in color, number, or symbol
- play a Wild card or a Wild Draw Four card if allowed to (see restrictions below)
- draw the top card from the deck and optionally play it if possible

Cards are played by laying them face-up on top of the discard pile. Play initially proceeds clockwise around the table.

Action or Wild cards have the following effects:

Card	Effect when played from hand	Effect as first discard
Skip	Next player in sequence misses a turn	Player to dealer's left misses a turn
Reverse	Order of play switches directions (clockwise to counterclockwise, or vice versa)	Dealer plays first; play proceeds counterclockwise
Draw Two (+2)	Next player in sequence draws two cards and misses a turn	Player to dealer's left draws two cards and misses a turn
Wild	Player declares the next color to be matched (may be used on any turn even if the player has any card of matching color)	Player to dealer's left declares the first color to be matched and takes the first turn
Wild Draw Four	Player declares the next color to be matched; next player in sequence draws four cards and misses a turn. May be legally played if the player has no cards of the current color (see Penalties)	Card is returned to the deck, then a new card is laid down into the discard pile (deck may be reshuffled first if needed)

- A player who draws a card from the deck must choose whether to play that card immediately or keep it. No cards already in their hand may be played on that turn.
- A Wild card may be played on any turn, even if the player holding it has cards that will match the current color, number, and/or symbol.
- A Wild Draw Four card may be played only if the player holding it has no cards matching the current color. The player may have cards of a different color matching the current number/symbol or a Wild card and still play the Wild Draw Four card. A player who plays a Wild Draw Four may be challenged by the next player in sequence (see Penalties) to prove that their hand meets this condition. An illegally played Wild Draw Four card incurs no penalty for its user unless challenged.
- A player using a Wild or Wild Draw Four card must declare the new matching color before ending their turn, and may declare the current color if desired.
- If the draw deck runs out during play, the discard pile is shuffled to create a new deck. Play then proceeds normally.
- It is illegal to trade cards of any sort with any other player at any time.

A player who plays their penultimate card must indicate it to the other players by calling out "Uno".

The first player to get rid of their last card ("going out") wins the hand and scores points for the cards held by each other player. Number cards count their face value, all action cards count 20, and Wild and Wild Draw Four cards count 50. If a Draw Two or Wild Draw Four card is played to go out, the next player in the sequence must draw the appropriate number of cards before the score is tallied.

The first player to score 500 points wins the game.

=== Penalties ===
- If a player does not call "Uno" while laying down their penultimate card and is caught before the next player in sequence takes their turn (i.e., plays a card from their hand, draws from the deck, or touches the discard pile), they must draw two cards as a penalty. If the player is not caught in time or remembers to call "Uno" before being caught, no penalty applies to that player.
- If a player plays a Wild Draw Four card, the next player in turn order may choose to challenge its use. The player who used the Wild Draw Four must privately show their hand to the challenging player in order to demonstrate that they had no cards of prior matching color. If the challenge is successful, the challenged player must draw four cards instead and play continues with the challenger. Otherwise, the challenger must draw six cards – the four cards they were already required to draw plus two more cards – and miss their turn. In either case, the Wild Draw Four stays with its chosen color.

=== Two-player game ===
In a two-player game, the Reverse card acts like a Skip card; when played, the other player misses a turn. This rule is not mentioned in the instruction sheets of modern copies of the game.

=== House rules ===
The following house rules are suggested in some official Uno instruction sets to alter the game:

When playing with the "stacking" house rule, a player can stack a +2 with a +2, as seen here.

- Progressive or Stacking Uno: If a draw card is played, and the next player in turn order has a card with the same symbol, that player can play that card and "stack" the penalty, which adds to the current penalty and passes it to the next player (although a +4 cannot be stacked on a +2, or vice versa). This house rule is so commonly used that there was widespread Twitter surprise in 2019 when Mattel stated that stacking was not part of the standard rules of Uno. They explicitly clarified that players cannot stack Draw Two (+2) or Wild Draw Four (+4) cards, confirming that stacking is strictly a house rule.
- Seven-O: Every time a "7" is played, whoever played it must swap hands with another player of their choice before ending their turn. Every time a "0" is played, all players pass their hands to the next player in the current direction of play, after which play continues normally.
- Jump-In: If a player has exactly the same card (both number and color) as the top card of the discard pile, they may play it immediately, even if it is not their turn. Play then continues as if that player had just taken their turn.

=== 2015 rule changes ===
The two new types of Wild cards have the following functions:

- Wild Swap Hands: The player using this card chooses another player with whom they swap cards in their respective hands.
- Wild Customizable: There are three copies of this; these cards are blank and can have a house rule assigned to them.

Each of these cards can be played on any turn and is worth 40 points when a player goes out.

=== 2017 rule changes ===
Wild Swap Hands was replaced in 2017 by Wild Shuffle Hands; the player using this new card collects all cards held by all players, then shuffles and re-deals them, starting from the player to their left. This card can also be played on any turn and is also worth 40 points when a player goes out.

=== 2022 rule changes ===
The goal to reach a certain number of points has been demoted and replaced with the one commonly used by most players, which is to be the first player to go out. If played for points, each Wild card is worth 50 points regardless of type. There is no longer an official method to determine the dealer. In addition, if the first card flipped at the start of a game is an Action or Wild card, it is ignored and another card is flipped until a number card comes up.

== Card and deck styles ==
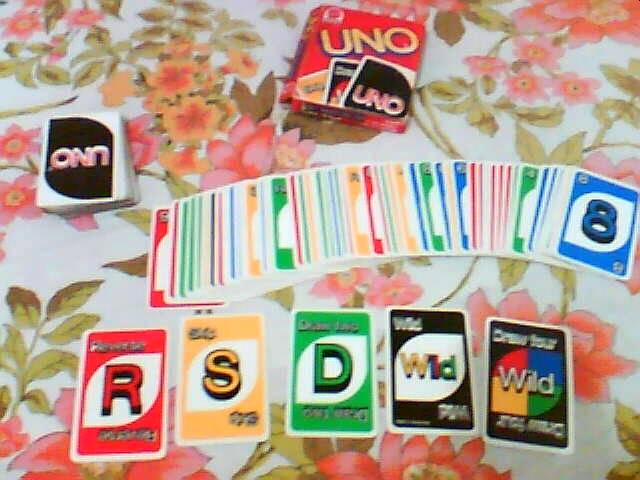
A deck of English Uno cards from 1994. This particular deck uses the older card design, where letters appear on the action cards instead of symbols.

Modern Uno action cards bear symbols which denote their action, except for the Wild cards which still bear the word "Wild". Before the design change, such cards in English versions of the game had letters only. Earlier English versions can be recognized by the absence of the white rim that surrounds the edge of most Uno cards.

Other versions of the game use symbols and images in both old and new designs, especially ones with Wild cards that do not bear the word "Wild". There are also language-free versions of the newer styles that do not bear the word "Wild" but have the same styling.

On September 16, 2017, Mattel released Uno ColorAdd, which was designed specifically for colorblind people.

On October 1, 2019, Mattel released a Braille version of their game with Mark Riccobono, president of the National Federation of the Blind. Riccobono said in a press release, "The fact that a blind person is now able to play a classic game of UNO straight out of the box with both blind and sighted friends or family members is a truly meaningful moment for our community."

The year 2024 saw the introduction of small shapes into the decks for better color blindness accessibility, part of a larger effort by Mattel to make 80% of its game catalog more playable to people in that disability sector. The shapes used are diamonds for yellow, circles for red, squares for blue, and triangles for green.

== Special Uno games ==
- Uno Duo (2026)
- Uno Championship Series (2026)
- Uno Show 'Em No Mercy Attack (Uno Show 'Em No Mercy Extreme in Europe) (2026)
- Uno Disney and Pixar Toy Story 5 (2026)
- Uno Pop (2026)
- Liar's Uno (2025)
- Uno Golf (Uno Zero in Europe) (2025)
- Mini Uno Bullseye (2024)
- Uno Elite (2024)
- Uno Teams! (2024)
- Uno Flip Attack (Uno Flip Extreme in Europe) (2024)
- Uno Show 'Em No Mercy (2023)
- Uno Flex! (2023)
- Uno Go! (2022)
- Uno Quatro (2023)
- Uno Wild Twists (2022)
- Uno All Wild (2022)
- Uno Deluxe (2022)
- Uno Remix (2022)
- Uno Party! (2022)
- UNO Ultimate™ Marvel (2022)
- Uno Play With Pride (2021)
- Uno 50th Anniversary (2021)
- Uno Lightyear (2021)
- Uno Triple Play (2021)
- Uno Flip Express (2020)
- Uno Showdown Supercharged (2020)
- Giant BTS Uno (2020)
- Electronic Uno (2020)
- Uno Flip! (2019)
- Uno Harry Potter (2019)
- Uno Attack Jurassic World (2018)
- Uno Minecraft (2018)
- Uno Express (2018)
- Get Wild for Uno (2016)
- Giant Uno (2016)
- Uno Wild Jackpot (2016)
- Uno Emoji (2016)
- Uno Tiki Twist (2014)
- Uno Dare (2014)
- Uno Royal Revenge (2014)
- Uno Moo (2008, 2014)
- Uno Power Grab (2012)
- Uno Blast (2012)
- Uno Cars 2 (2011)
- Uno Choo-Choo (2011)
- Uno Horses (2011)
- Uno Dice (1987, 1996, 2011)
- Uno Reflex (2010)
- Uno Roboto (2010)
- Uno Spin To Go (2010)
- Uno Tippo (2009)
- Uno Flip (2009) (Target Store Exclusive)
- Uno Flash (2007)
- Uno Attack Refill Deck (2005)
- Uno Spin (2005)
- Uno Spin Hannah Montana (2005)
- Uno H_{2}O (2004)
- Uno Blitzo (2000)
- Uno Attack (Uno Extreme in the UK and Canada) (1999)
- Uno Bingo (1997)
- Uno Madness (1995)
- Uno Hearts (1994)
- King Size Uno (1994)
- Uno Stacko (1994)
- Uno Rummy Up (1993)
- Uno Junior (1992)
- Uno Wild Tiles (1982)
- Uno Dominoes (1986)
- Uno Color Screen
- Uno H_{2}O To Go
- Uno Spin One Piece (Japan)
- Travel Uno Stacko

=== Uno H2O ===
Uno H_{2}O differs from the standard game in that the cards are transparent and waterproof. Play is identical to the standard pre-2015 Uno game, with the addition of two types of "Wild Downpour" cards. When one of these is played, all other players must draw either one or two cards as indicated on the card. The player using it may then declare the next color to be matched. Several of the other sets have been released in this format.

=== Uno Fandom series ===
In 2023, Mattel's imprint Mattel Creations released a special collector's series of Uno games based on fandom of fictional properties and sports teams. The initial group of sets in this series included those based on all 32 NFL teams and several fictional properties, including Star Trek, Harry Potter, Masters of the Universe, Avatar: the Last Airbender and Monster High. Most are exclusive to the Mattel online store and can only be purchased directly from the store.

== Video games ==
- Uno DX (Sega Saturn) and Uno (PlayStation) – 1998
- Uno (handheld video game) – 2000
- Uno (handheld video game for the Game Boy Color of the classic Uno board game)
- Uno (PlayStation Network)
- Uno (Xbox Live Arcade)
- Uno Rush (Xbox Live Arcade)
- Uno Challenge (mobile version of the classic Uno board game)
- "Uno: Vahalla" (Nintendo Switch, PlayStation 4, Xbox One, Microsoft Windows); 2022
- Uno Free Fall (puzzle game for mobile phones)
- Uno 52 (Game Boy Advance and Nintendo DS)
- Super Uno (Super Famicom)
- Uno (Facebook) (Adobe Flash–based version of the classic Uno card game produced by GameHouse)
- Uno (iPhone) Features online and local play. Produced by Gameloft
- Uno (iPad) The same as on the iPhone, but with enhanced graphics. Produced by Gameloft
- Uno (Android) Released as three versions: SD, HD and Free with adverts. Produced by Gameloft
- Uno (DSi)
- Uno (WiiWare) Produced by Gameloft
- Uno & Friends (various platforms)
- Pocket Uno
- Uno and Uno & Friends for Windows Phone
- Uno Undercover (Windows)
- Uno (2016 video game for PC, PlayStation 4 and Xbox One by Ubisoft)
- Uno (2017) – the 2016 game release on the Nintendo Switch), produced by Ubisoft

== Variations ==
Many variations from standard gameplay exist, such as Elimination Uno, Speed Uno and Pirate Uno.

On February 13, 2018, Mattel released a spin-off of Uno entitled Dos; the game is differentiated primarily by having a "center row" of discard piles, where pairs of cards that add up to the sum of a card on the top of one of the piles may be discarded.

The game can be played with two decks of standard playing cards if the jokers are marked up as the zeroes of the four suits and the royalty treated as the special cards.

After mixed reviews for the original game, Mattel released another version of Dos titled Dos Second Edition, which plays more like Uno but still includes some rules from the original Dos. The new Dos has Skip, Reverse and Draw Two cards (which were not included in the original Dos) but retains the Wild Dos Card and the two discard piles. A new card was introduced known as the Wild Play Two Card, forcing the next player to play a minimum of two cards, if they can not they play nothing and draw two cards. Like Uno, players start with seven cards and the main way to win is by discarding all cards first.

== Spin-offs ==
=== Slot machines ===
In 2002, International Gaming Technology introduced a "pod concept" for grouping the prize winnings of similarly themed and newly released MegaJackpot games into one collective pool. Among these was the new Famous Games pod, unveiling two new Mattel-licensed machines, UNO Slots and Magic 8 Ball slots. In the following two years, additional properties were tied into the pod, along with the Video Slot versions of both UNO and Magic 8 Ball.

The UNO slot machine featured a basic vertical 3 wheel system, along with 3 additional horizontal wheels that would activate when 3 UNO bonus symbols in any position were landed with the maximum bet wagered. Meanwhile, the UNO Video Slot Machine featured a 5 reel, 15 line Video system with additional UNO Attack and UNO Triple bonus games awarded based on the symbols landed. Both versions saw limited releases to various Native American gaming centers.

=== Uno: The Game Show ===
In March 2013, it was announced that Mattel and the Gurin Company were teaming up to create a game show based on the card game, produced as a half-hour daily strip with a $100,000 cash jackpot along with a primetime version in which contestants competed for $1 million. However, the idea was scrapped later on.

=== Film adaptation ===
On February 4, 2021, an action heist comedy film based on the game was announced to be in development for Mattel Films with Lil Yachty of record label Quality Control Music developing and being eyed for the lead role alongside the label's managers Kevin "Coach K" Lee and Pierre "P" Thomas, and Brian Sher for Quality Films producing, Marcy Kelly writing, and Robbie Brenner and Kevin McKeon leading the project as executive producer and supervising producer, respectively.

== Similar games ==
Uno is a member of the shedding family of card games. The shedding family of card games consists of games where the objective is to get rid of all of one's cards while preventing the other players from getting rid of their cards.

- Crazy Eights
  - Black Jack (Switch)
  - Switch (card game)
- Eleusis
- Last Card
- Macau
- Mao
- Mau-Mau (card game)
- O'NO 99
- One Card (game)
- Phase 10
- Skip-Bo
- Taki
- Whot!

== Complexity ==
Uno has been studied from the perspective of combinatorial game theory. When played by two uncooperative players, Uno has been shown to be solvable in polynomial time. For two players playing cooperatively, the game becomes NP-complete.

A solitaire variant of the game where a player inspects their hand and decides if there is an order in which every card can be played has been shown to be solvable in polynomial time for a constant number of colours and numbers (as in the standard Uno deck). For the general case with many colors and many numbers, the problem is NP-complete.

The problem of finding a way to play all cards in a hand is equivalent to searching for a Hamiltonian path on a graph with vertices representing each card, and edges connecting cards that share a colour or number.

== Reception ==
The Games magazine included Uno in their "Top 100 Games of 1980", noting that the game "borrows so much from the familiar card game of Crazy Eights" but that "it's a much better game and just as simple to learn". They would later include the game in their "Top 100 Games of 1982", noting that its "popularity is based on its simplicity, not on its strategic aspects" and that "the game has a rummylike scoring system".

== Reviews ==
- Family Games: The 100 Best
