= List of shedding-type games =

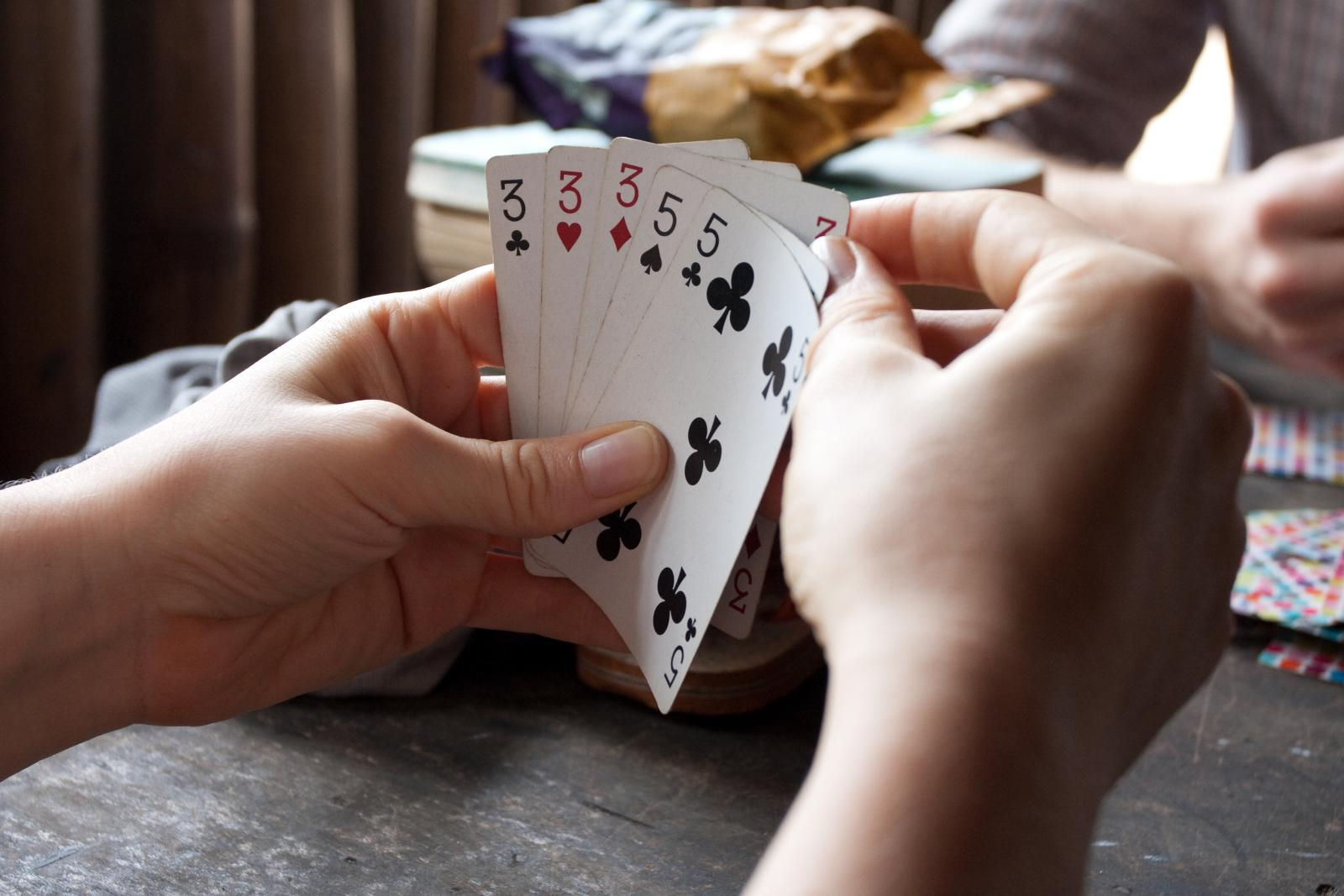
A player's hand of cards in a shedding-type game

In shedding-type games, the player's objective is to empty one's hand of all cards or tiles before all other players.

== Games with action/power/trick cards ==
In these games, players win by having the fewest points.

- Crazy Eights
- Craits
- One Card
- Cabo
- Mau Mau
- Macau
- Switch
- Whot!

== Progressively add rules ==
- Bartok
- Mao

== One suit per player ==
- Red nines

== One deck per pair ==
Players play in pairs, shed sets of cards for points and win by reaching a certain point value.

- Biriba
- Canasta

== Different trump suit per player ==
- Farmer Henry

== Bluffing ==
- Cheat

== Asian games ==
- Big two
- Daifugō
- Dou dizhu
- Gou Ji
- Guandan
- President
- Tien len
- Zheng Fen
- Zheng Shangyou

== Proprietary ==
- Boom-O
- Castle
- Flaps
- Happy Mochi
- Lexicon
- Phase 10
- Scout
- Taki
- Uno
- Whot

== Miscellaneous ==
- Cards in the hat
- Speed
