= Clubhouse Games =

2005 video game

- North American cover art
- Developer: Agenda
- Publisher: Nintendo
- Platforms: Nintendo DS; DSiWare
- Release: JP: November 3, 2005; EU: September 29, 2006; NA: October 9, 2006; AU: October 26, 2006; WW: April 20, 2007
- Genre: Tabletop game
- Modes: Single-player, multiplayer

Clubhouse Games (Note: known in some European countries as 42 All-Time Classics and in Japanese as Dare demo Asobi Taizen, (Note: Japanese: だれでもアソビ大全, Hepburn: Collection of Games for Everyone)) is a party video game developed by Agenda and published by Nintendo for the Nintendo DS. It consists of board, card, and tabletop games from around the world. It was released across 2005 and 2006, with some games included varying between regions. A follow-up for the Nintendo Switch, Clubhouse Games: 51 Worldwide Classics, was developed by NDcube and released worldwide in June 2020.

== Gameplay ==
Clubhouse Games is a compilation of board, card, and tabletop games from around the world. The game is compatible with the Nintendo DS Rumble Pak. If the Rumble Pak is inserted, the Nintendo DS will vibrate when it is the player's turn in the game. The compilation contains three different game modes: Free Play, Stamp Mode, and Mission Mode.

In free-play mode, the player may choose any of the 42 games available to play. Clubhouse Games divides its 42 games up into eight categories.

Stamp mode is a single-player mode that has three levels of difficulty. Players receive 1–3 stamps depending on how they place in the games. Several games in the "Free Play" mode are locked until the player plays them in Stamp Mode. After completing the first "easy" level of Stamp Mode, normal and hard modes are unlocked. Beating the normal mode unlocks the "stamp" section in the chat window; finishing hard mode gives the player a new color to use in the chat window and one last stamp.

Mission mode is a single-player mode that features 30 missions to accomplish. Some missions include beating the "Memory" card game under three minutes, bowling three strikes in a row, or getting 200 points in Darts. When a mission is successfully completed, another icon is unlocked. When all 30 missions have been completed, an alternative "Pop" soundtrack is unlocked.

=== Games ===
Basic Card Games:

- Old Maid
- Spit
- I Doubt It
- Sevens
- Memory
- Pig

Intermediate Card Games:

- Blackjack
- Hearts
- President
- Rummy
- Seven Bridge
- Last card
- Last Card Plus

Advanced Card Games:

- Five Card Draw
- Texas Hold'Em
- Nap
- Spades
- Contract Bridge

Basic Board Games:

- Chinese Checkers
- Checkers
- Dots and Boxes
- Hasami Shogi
- Turncoat
- Connect Five
- Grid Attack

Advanced Board Games:

- Backgammon
- Chess
- Shogi
- Field Tactics
- Ludo

Variety Games:

- Soda Shake
- Dominoes
- Koi-Koi
- Word Balloon

Action Games:

- Bowling
- Darts
- Billiards
- Balance
- Takeover

Single-Player Games:

- Solitaire
- Escape
- Mahjong Solitaire

=== Multiplayer ===
A player may send over a demo of a game by using the "gift" option. They can set the difficulty of the CPU. It is similar to the DS Download Station demo; the receiving player may play the game as many times as they want, but once the Nintendo DS is turned off, the game is erased.

Clubhouse Games supports the Nintendo Wi-Fi Connection service. The original Japanese version did not feature WFC support, but an April 2007 release features it. Out of the 42 games, Old Maid, Spit, I Doubt It, Pig, and the three "Single Player Games" are not playable over WFC. With strangers, players may send emoticons and pre-selected messages (such as "Good game!" and "Aaack!"). Like all other WFC-compatible games, it uses a friends list and friend code system. Against friends, players can draw out messages. Clubhouse Games also supports Single-Card and Multi-Card Download Play for up to eight players.

== Development ==
Clubhouse Games was developed by Agenda. The 42 games included in Daredemo Asobi Taizen are similar to the games included in Clubhouse Games, but there are some differences. The original Japanese version lacked the Nintendo Wi-Fi Connection service of the North American version, and the aesthetics of many games have been changed across regions. The games goninkan, bozu mekuri, sugoroku, seesaw game, last one, mini golf, and Napoleon (a Japanese card game unrelated to the British card game nap) are exclusive to Daredemo Asobi Taizen; Texas hold'em, dots and boxes, grid attack, ludo, dominoes, escape, and mahjong solitaire are exclusive to the international versions.

== Reception ==
Reception

Aggregate scores
Aggregator	Score
GameRankings	82.98%
Metacritic	83/100

Review scores
Publication	Score
Eurogamer	9/10
GamesMaster	80/100
GameSpot	8/10
GameSpy	4.5/5
GamesRadar+	3.5/5
IGN	8.5/10
Nintendo Life	8/10
Nintendo World Report	9/10
Official Nintendo Magazine	90%
PALGN	8/10
Pocket Gamer	4.5/5

The game received generally positive reviews from outlets, with many reviewers praising the game for its diverse selection, simple interface, and tweakable and easily accessible rules. The portable "pick-up-and-play" mentality was also praised. Some of the more popular games in the collection included Solitaire and Mahjong Solitaire. Much of the game's criticism comes from the limitations on card games. Both GameSpot and GameSpy complained that Texas Hold'Em allowed players to bet in negative chip totals and did not offer no-limit playing. Also noted was that the Blackjack options to "split" cards and buy insurance were not in this series. Stamp Mode was greeted more warily. IGN noted that having to unlock some games through Stamp Mode went against the "pick-up-and-play" mentality of the compilation, while GameSpy went further in calling it a "cheap way" to get players to play every game.

Clubhouse Games was the runner-up for IGN's best offline multiplayer game for the Nintendo DS, losing only to Bomberman Land Touch!, and a nominee for GameSpot's Nintendo DS Game of the Year for 2006.

=== Sales ===
Clubhouse Games (as 42 All-Time Classics) received a "Double Platinum" sales award from the Entertainment and Leisure Software Publishers Association (ELSPA), indicating sales of at least 600,000 copies in the United Kingdom.

== DSi releases ==
Several games from Clubhouse Games have been re-released in five-game compilations for the Nintendo DSi through the DSiWare download service. The DSi series is titled Chotto Asobi Taizen (ちょっとアソビ大全) in Japan, A Little Bit Of... All Time Classics in Europe, and Clubhouse Games Express in American English. All of the versions came out with the alternative Pop soundtrack, all player icons, and the stamps and golden color for the chat mode pre-unlocked; only the game designs still have to be unlocked.

- Chotto Asobi Taizen: Otegaru Trump (ちょっとアソビ大全 おてがるトランプ) consists of Old Maid, Spit, Sevens, Memory, and I Doubt It. It was released in Japan on December 24, 2008. In American English it is known as Clubhouse Games Express: Family Favorites which includes Hearts, Contract Bridge, Dominoes, Ludo, and Dots and Boxes. It was released on September 7, 2009 and in Europe on November 6 as A Little Bit of... All Time Classics: Family Games.
- Clubhouse Games Express: Card Classics (Chotto Asobi Taizen: Jikkuri Trump (ちょっとアソビ大全 じっくりトランプ) in Japanese) consists of Blackjack, Five Card Draw, Last Card, Last Card Plus, and President. It was released in Japan on January 28, 2009, in North America on April 27, and in Europe on October 30 as A Little Bit of... All Time Classics: Card Classics. It came pre-installed with every DSi XL system in Oceania.
- Chotto Asobi Taizen: Onajimi Table (ちょっとアソビ大全 おなじみテーブル) consists of Turncoat, Hasami Shogi, Connect Five, Shogi, and Koi-Koi. It was released in Japan on February 25, 2009. In American English it is known as Clubhouse Games Express: Strategy Pack which includes Backgammon, Field Tactics, Turncoat, Connect Five, and Grid Attack. It was released on September 21 and in Europe on November 20 as A Little Bit of... All Time Classics: Strategy Pack.
