= Flaps (card game) =

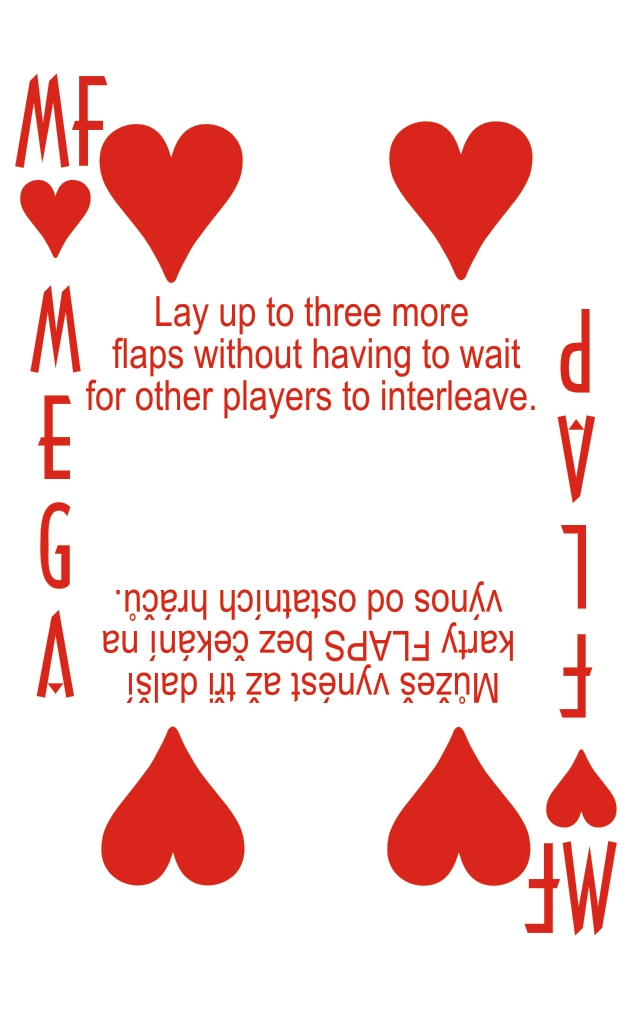
- Origin: England
- Designer: Paul Feagan
- Publisher: Self-published
- Release date: 1994; 31 years ago
- Type: Shedding-type
- Players: 2+
- Skills: Tactics, Communication
- Cards: 148
- Deck: Anglo-American
- Rank (high→low): Mega-Flap, Ace'n'Lay, Ace'n'End, Ace, Ace-Jack, Up Jacks, K Q J 10 9 8 7 6 5 4 3 2
- Play: Clockwise and Counter-clockwise
- Playing time: Various
- Chance: Low

Related games
- Crazy Eights, Uno, Whot!

Flaps is a commercial card game released in 1994, and is a shedding-type card game for two or more players. It is based on the game Crazy Eights, and uses a custom deck of playing cards with additional rules written in both English and Czech. The game has seven levels, each level adding new functionality.

The aim of the game is to discard all of the cards in one's hand; the first player to do so wins the game.

== History ==
The game was invented by Paul Feagan of England in 1981, when he wrote special rules onto regular playing cards in a game of Crazy Eights. The first edition of the game was published in 1994. The game was translated into a dual English-Czech version by Martina Krupičková in 2009.

== Object ==
Flaps is played with a custom deck of playing cards.

Each player at his turn may play any card from his hand that matches the suit or the rank of the card previously played; for example, if the previous card was a seven of clubs, the next player may put down any seven card, or any club card, from his hand. Should the player not have any card available to play or not wish to go, he must pick up one card.

== Game rules ==
Players are initially dealt seven cards. The remainder of the deck is placed face down and serve as a "pool" or drawing stack. At the beginning of the game the topmost card from the "pool" is revealed and play begins.

The first to play (generally, the player on the dealer's left) should select from his or her hand a card that matches either, the suit or the rank of the open card (the card that is "top"); for example, on a 10 of spades, only a spade card or a 10 may be played. If a player is not able to place a card or doesn't want to lay a card, he takes a card from the drawing stack.

If the drawing stack is empty or nearly so, the playing stack or discard pile (except for the topmost card) is inverted and placed face down beneath the remaining drawing stack, preserving the order of the cards previously played.

=== Level cards ===
The game includes seven levels of cards with special effects. Those at Level 1 are:-

Ace 'n' Lay
A wildcard which allows the player to change the suit, then immediately play another card of that suit.
2 and 3
The next player must draw 2 (or 3) cards, unless they can also play a 2 (or 3), in which case the next player draws 4 (or 6), and so on.
7
Reverses the order of play.
8
Next player misses their turn unless they can also play an 8.
9
Cancels a 2 or 3.
4 ("Flaps")
The 4-rank cards are called "Flaps", and the 4♥ a "Mega-Flap". When a Flap card is laid, anyone can lay Flaps cards in any order, so long as they interleave (i.e. take turns) with the other players. Playing a Mega-Flap allows that player to immediately play up to three more Flaps, without interleaving. When the Flapping is finished, play continues in the same direction, following suit or number as normal.
10 and Queen ("Hoofer-Doofer")
Force any other player to draw a card, unless they can also play a Hoofer-Doofer.
Jacks
Reverse the order of play. Some Jacks are marked as "Up-Jacks", and force every player to draw a card. Some are "Ace-Jacks" and allow the player to change the suit being played.

=== Endgame ===
If a player has only one card left in their hand, they must say "Last Card". Failing to do so requires the player to draw a penalty card.

When a player plays their last card, so long as the card is eligible as a last card, they win the game. If the last card is a card that cannot be finished on, they must take another card from the drawing stack.

== Additional levels ==
The third pack in the Flaps Card box contains cards for additional levels. The idea being that when players are comfortable with the basic level one card game, they open the third pack and shuffle in the cards for Level Two. Players then add a level as soon as they believe they are ready to move up. There are seven levels in total:

- Level Two adds four King Trumps and four Ol' Maid Cards.
- Level Three adds five individual cards (0 Quack, 4 - Stop That Flapping, 5 - Dump Those Fives, 6 - Six of the Best and King 'n' Lay), each with a specific function.
- Level Four adds two King Spoof and two Low Ol' Maid cards.
- Level Five adds six cards, all fives, each with a specific function - the names of the cards are a tribute to The Famous Five novel series by Enid Blyton.
- Level Six adds nineteen cards, all ones, each with a specific function.
- Level Seven adds four King Full Monty cards. These add a new aspect to the game based around the Monty Hall problem.

== See also ==
- Craits
- Crazy Eights
- Whot!
- Screw Your Neighbour
