= One-card =

Shedding-type card game

- Type: Shedding-type
- Players: 2+
- Cards: 54
- Deck: Anglo-American
- Rank (high→low): A K Q J 10 9 8 7 6 5 4 2 3 1
- Play: Clockwise, counter-clockwise
- Playing time: 15-20 min.
- Chance: Medium

Related games
- Switch • Mau Mau

One-card is a shedding-type card game. The general principles put it into the crazy eights family. It is played with an ordinary poker deck and the objective is for a player to empty their own hand while preventing other players from emptying theirs. The game is commonly played in South Korea, Finland and The Netherlands.

== Rules of play ==
The dealer deals out seven cards for two players, or five cards for three or more players. When all players have been dealt their hands, one card is laid face-up in the middle of the table to form the discard pile, and the rest of the deck laid face-down beside it forming the stock pile. The Jokers are used.

The player to the dealer's right plays first by following the rank or suit of the first card led, or by playing a wild card. If the players can not follow the lead, they must draw a card from the stock. The players then take turns playing or drawing cards and the first player who plays all his or her cards out wins the game.

=== Action cards ===
- King - Take another turn (play another card, or draw a card if none can be played).
- Queen - Reverse the direction of play (in the case of two players, it functions just like a jack).
- Jack - Jump (skip) the next player.

=== Attack and defense cards ===
When an attack card is played, the next player must draw one or more cards, or play another attack card.

- 2 - damage level of 2.
- Ace - damage level of 3.
- Joker (black) - damage level of 7.
- Joker (colored) - damage level of 10. “Can only be used with correlation to the color of the Joker”
- Three - "shield", one can block the attack card with any "shape" of three cards.
- Seven - "change", one can change the suit to any suit of one's choice.

Damage adds up (2♠ followed by A♠ would have a total damage of 7). After drawing because of attack, it is still that player's turn; they may play one or more of the cards that they have just drawn.

In the Netherlands their version of One-card, called Pesten, is played without shield-cards and often drop some rules to make it easier. The 8 replaces the Jack, Jack replaces the 7, 7 and King have the same function (but one is chosen at the start, mostly 7) and the Aces replaces the Queen. Children usually use rhymes to remember the rules, such as "Acht; wacht. Zeven; kleven." ("Eight; wait. Seven; stick.")

The Finnish variant (Yksi kortti) follows mostly the same rules as the South Korean game with the addition of allowing a player to play as many cards of the same value at once as one wishes, provided that the first card laid down is a valid answer to the card played by the previous player. In Finland the game is also typically played counterclockwise, with the loser of the previous round playing first.

=== The stockpile ===
The stockpile is the stack of cards that have not yet gone into play. If this pile gets exhausted, and that frequently happens during the game, a player takes all but the last (top) card from the discard pile, shuffle them, to form a new stock of cards

=== Play variations ===
- A player can play more than one card at a time, but the cards must be the same rank (number or letter); in effect the suit is changed.
- Two or more kings can be played, in which case the player can take yet another turn. Two or more queens are played, the effect of the second cancels the first. If two or more jacks are played, one player is skipped for each jack.
- A maximum number of cards to be drawn due to a series of attack cards can be set (usually 20).
- When playing against an attack card, a player must play one of equal or greater value of the top card. If the player plays a card with less damage, they must draw another from the stock, and if they play a Two on an ace, they must still draw a card.
- Other reasons for penalty cards can be added.
- Instead of being a shield, a 3 can be used as a mirror to return the attack to the last attacking player, also reversing the direction of play.
- If a player ends on an attack card, and the attack moves through the whole circle back to them, they must pick up the cards associated with that attack (works best with two players).

== See also ==
- Uno (card game)
