= Craits =

American card game

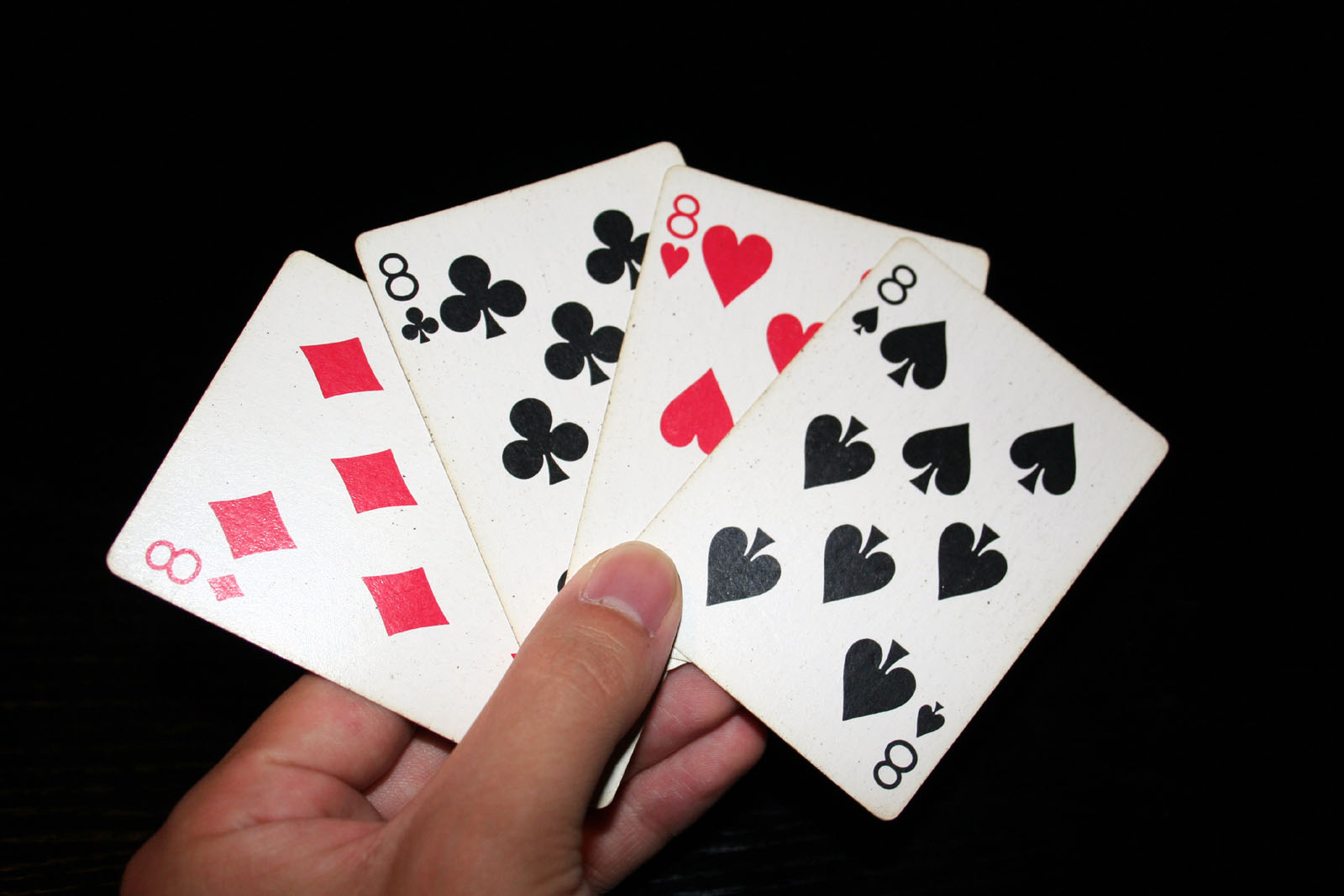
- Origin: Cambridge, Massachusetts
- Type: Shedding-type
- Players: 2+
- Skills: Tactics, Communication
- Cards: 52
- Deck: Anglo-American
- Rank (high→low): A K Q J 10 9 8 7 6 5 4 3 2
- Play: Clockwise and Counter-clockwise
- Playing time: Various
- Chance: Medium

Related games
- UNO

Craits (sometimes spelled Crates, Kreights or Creights) is a shedding card game for two to five players derived from Crazy Eights, which forms the origin of its name. Accounts of the game's origin are unclear, with some sources alleging it was created in the late 1960s in Chicago, Illinois and others in the 1970s in Cambridge, Massachusetts.

Craits is similar to the marketed game Uno, which has its own specialized deck, and many cards share the functions of Uno's specialized cards.

== Rules ==
=== Basic principles ===
A standard deck of 52 playing cards is used; if more than five players wish to play, two decks may be used. To determine the first dealer, cards may be drawn from the deck by each player; whoever drew the lowest card then proceeds with the first deal.

A game consists of 15 hands; in the first hand, 8 cards are dealt to each player. In the second hand, 7 cards are dealt, and so on until the eighth hand, when only one card is dealt to each player. Following this, each hand increases the number of cards dealt to each player by one, until the fifteenth hand, in which 8 cards are dealt.

In each hand, the deal starts to the left; however, over the course of a hand, this may change. Following the deal, the remaining cards are placed at the centre of the table, and the top card is turned over by the dealer, at which point the player to the left of the dealer begins play for the hand.

=== The play ===
The first card, and every card thereafter, determines a special function for the next player to follow. The card turned up is treated as being played by the dealer, and follows with whatever function it serves in play before the next player has their turn.

In each player's turn, they may play a card of either the same suit or the same rank as the card on the top of the discard pile, or an eight or nine, which are considered wild cards. If a player cannot play any cards, then they must draw one card from the stock and play then proceeds to the next player. An exception to this style of play happens during the count, which is explained in further detail lower. Following each card's play, its action is taken before the next player has their turn.

At any time when a player reduces their hand to one card, they must say "one card". Failure to do so (which is often signified by an opponent calling idiot) results in the forfeiting of their next turn and having to draw two cards instead.

Each hand ends when any player plays their final card; referred to as going out. However, if this happens during "the count", play continues as usual until it ends normally. Also, the effects of the card are resolved before the hand ends, so if the card is a five, everyone else draws a card before scoring, and so on.

=== Functions of each card ===
Following the play of each card, a special action is taken depending on the rank of the card played. This includes the card turned up by the dealer. The functions of each card are as follows:

Card	Function
Ace	Used during "the count".
2	Starts "the count".
3	None, but holds special scoring privileges.
4	The next player skips their turn.
5	Every other player receives a card.
6	The same player plays another card; if the player can't play a card (or is left without a card), they need to draw a card from the stock.
7	The next player but one takes a card (if only two or three are playing, the next player takes a card from the stock before taking a turn).
8	Wild; the player then can call a specific suit to change it to.
9	Can change to the other suit of the same colour.
10	Reverses the direction of play.
Jack	None
Queen	None
King	None

=== The count ===
If a two is played (including turned up by the dealer), "the count" begins, starting at a value of two. Each player must then play either an ace or a two, increasing the value of the count by either one or two, depending on the card played. If a player can not play an ace or two at this stage, they draw cards from the stock equating to the count value, and normal play resumes with the next player in sequence. This process is also known in some dialects as a crank.

== Scoring ==
Upon the completion of a hand, the person who gets rid of their last card gets 0 points. The remaining players then add points to their score based on the cards remaining in their hand according to the following point values:

Card	Point Value
Ace	1
2	20
3	3 (but see below)
4	15
5	30
6	30
7	20
8	50
9	30
10	25
Jack	10
Queen	10
King	10

At the end of the game, the player with the lowest cumulative point total is declared the winner.

=== Scoring threes ===
A three left in the hand at the end of play scores 3 points, but it may also be used to cancel out another card in the player's hand. An eight may not, however, have its point value canceled.

Example: In a hand containing A, 3, 3, 6, 7, 9, K, the threes may be used to cancel out the point values of the 6 and 9 (as they are the highest scoring cards remaining), and therefore it counts 1 + 3 + 3 + 20 + 10, or 37 points. If a hand is left with only threes at the end of play, each three instead counts −50 points.

=== Shuffle pressure ===
If a player has to draw a card, but the stock is exhausted, they must then shuffle the cards remaining in the discard pile (except for the top card), and be subject to a shuffle pressure penalty. The first shuffle pressure adds 5 points to the player's score, and every shuffle pressure following doubles the score of the last one; for instance, the second shuffle pressure adds 10 points, the third 20 points, and so on. The penalties for the shuffle pressures are independent for each player, and double throughout the game.

If a player has to draw a card, but there are no cards in the draw pile and no cards in the play pile (except for the top card), then they get a shuffle pressure, and the round ends immediately.

== Variations ==
- A short game of Craits only consists of the first eight hands, starting with the eight-card deal and ending with the one-card deal.
- If the direction of rotation in the previous hand finished as counter-clockwise upon the last card played, then both the progression of the dealer and the direction of the deal may proceed to the right rather than to the left, resulting in a bizarre sequence of dealers. It is theoretically possible for a game to go through with only two players dealing at different times.
- The kings and queens may be removed in a two-player or three-player game to result in a greater risk of shuffle pressure.
- The "one card" rule also may apply in the hand in which one card is dealt; each player must then say "one card" upon receiving their card from the dealer.
- Instead of forfeiting their next turn upon an idiot call, a penalty of one "idiot card" from the stock may be drawn immediately by the player who failed to call "one card".
- If a player goes out during "the count", and ends up drawing cards upon the completion, play may continue for the hand.
- A three may cancel any other non-three card in the player's hand, including an eight.
- There are many other scoring variants. The most common are punitive scoring rules, where threes can not cover aces or threes either, and if you have extra threes that can not cover anything, they are worth 100 points each (if you have only threes, they are still worth −50 each.)
- Going out on a hand is worth −10 points.

=== Variation that gives functions to face cards ===
In a variation of Craits the face cards may be given functions of their own, and the scoring values in this version are the same as in the regular one.

Jack
the first jack played in succession forces the next player to take two cards from the stock and forfeit their turn. A second jack in succession forces the next player in turn to take four cards; three jacks in succession force the next player in succession to take six cards, and four jacks in succession force the next player to take eight cards.
Queen of Spades
this forces the next player to take five cards from the stock and forfeit their turn.
King
upon the play of a king, the player must then play three cards in succession from their hand, or draw a card from the stock where unable to play a card. The first two cards played do not exhibit their normal functions, except for the eight and nine, which have their usual functions and allow the player to easily change suits. If a player can play a king as the third card in the sequence, then they can continue and play another three cards; having a supply of kings and easy ways to change suits can result in a player getting rid of multiple cards within the same turn.

== See also ==
- Screw Your Neighbour
- Crazy Eights
- Mau Mau (card game)
- Switch (card game)

== Sources ==
- Parker, Josh (March 1984). "Creights: The Wackiest Deal Around". Games. No. 49. Playboy Enterprises. pp. 52–53. Archived from the original on 2020-10-07.
