= Macau (card game) =

Hungarian card game

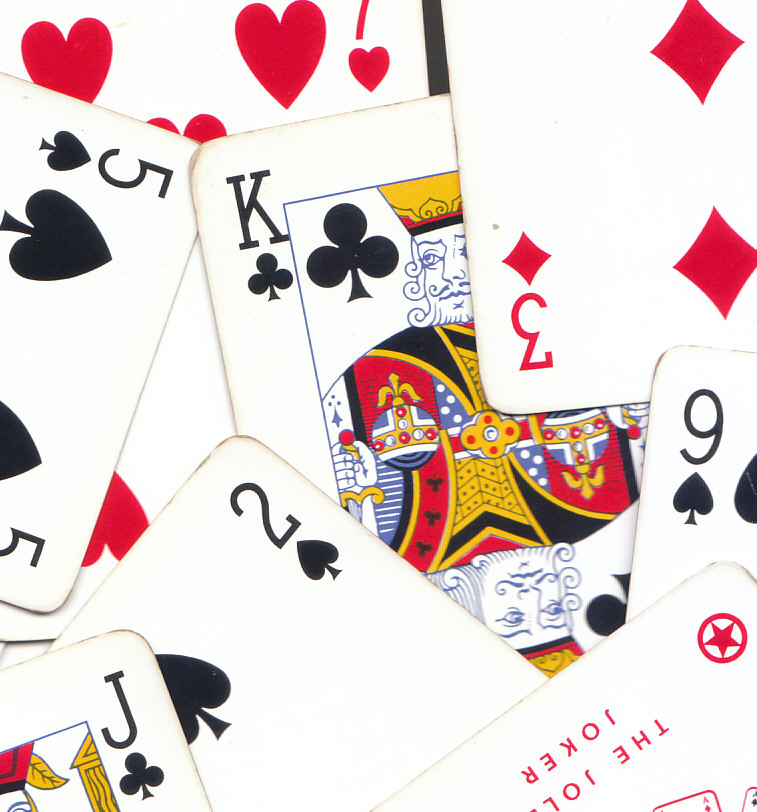
- A standard deck of playing cards is used to play Macau.
- Players: 2–10 (theoretically unlimited with additional decks); one deck supports up to four players
- Setup time: Under one minute
- Playing time: Approximately 10–30 minutes
- Chance: Medium / High
- Skills: Strategic and tactical thinking, reading opponents' possibilities

Macau, also spelled Makaua or Macaua, is a shedding-type card game from Hungary, with similar rules to Crazy Eights or Uno and uses a standard 52 card deck. The object of the game is to be the first player to remove all cards from one's hand. Macau involves tactical play where players manage their cards to maximize their hand's efficiency and strategically respond to opponents' moves. Bluffing is a core element, as players may choose to withhold playable cards to preserve them for later use.

The game belongs to the broader Crazy Eights family, which first appeared in the 1930s and shares fundamental shedding mechanics with games such as Mau-Mau (Germany), Pesten (Netherlands), and Switch (United Kingdom). The name Macau is distinct from the unrelated 18th-century banking card game Macao, a forerunner of baccarat.

== Rules ==
Two or more players (up to 10) are dealt 5 cards each. For larger groups, additional decks may be added at the players' discretion — a single 52-card deck (twos through aces) is generally sufficient for two to four players. The deck is then cut and the cut card becomes the first card in the discard pile; if the revealed card is an action card, it is returned to the deck and the next card is revealed in its place. Players determine the order of play, which is usually clockwise. Play starts to the dealer's right.

When playing the game, the player that has one last card cannot end the game with a 2 or 3 while playing in two. If the player has 2 cards which are the same (e.g. 2 of spades and 2 of hearts), they call double Macau. However, if the other player holds a card that is also a 2 of diamonds, the first player has to pick up 6 cards from the deck. If played in a group, the player can end the game with a 2 and a 3. For example, if one player is holding the last card and the card is the 3 of spades, the next player must withdraw three cards unless they have a 2 to pass on to the next player, which will mean the next player must withdraw 5 cards from the deck.

The next card played must be of the same suit or the same value as the card on the top of the discard pile. For example, if a 7♠ was on the top of the discard pile, the player can play a 9♠ or a 7♣. Alternatively, an Ace or Joker can be played, as they are wild. If the player cannot play a card, they must draw from the deck. If a drawn card matches the top of the discard pile, it may be played immediately (the "first card saves" rule). When saving with such a card, a player may, depending on the variant, also play one or more additional matching cards from their hand alongside it.

Cards can be played in runs, meaning that cards of consecutive values in the same suit may be played in the same turn. These runs may be continued into different suits if cards of the same value are included. For example, 5♠, 6♠, 7♠, 7♥, 8♥, 8♣, 7♣ would be valid. Multiple cards of the same value or suit may also be played together in a single turn, so long as the bottom card of the group matches the top of the discard pile. With a single deck (including two or three jokers), a player can theoretically play six or seven cards in one turn — for example, four queens plus two or three jokers.

If the draw pile is exhausted during the game, the discard pile — except for the top card — is shuffled and turned face-down to form a new draw pile. Only the card that was on top of the discard pile remains face-up.

When an action card is played, the player next in the sequence must complete the action or add to it to pass it on to the next player. When down to a single card, a player must say "Macau!". If an opponent calls "Macau!" before the player does, the player must draw 5 cards. The winner of the game is the first player to have no cards. In instances of more than 2 players, gameplay continues until only one player is left with cards — players finish in ranked order (1st, 2nd, 3rd, etc.). When ending the game a player may put down two, three or four cards of the same value on their final turn; in some variants the player must then say "Macau and after Macau!", while in others no announcement is required.

=== Action cards ===
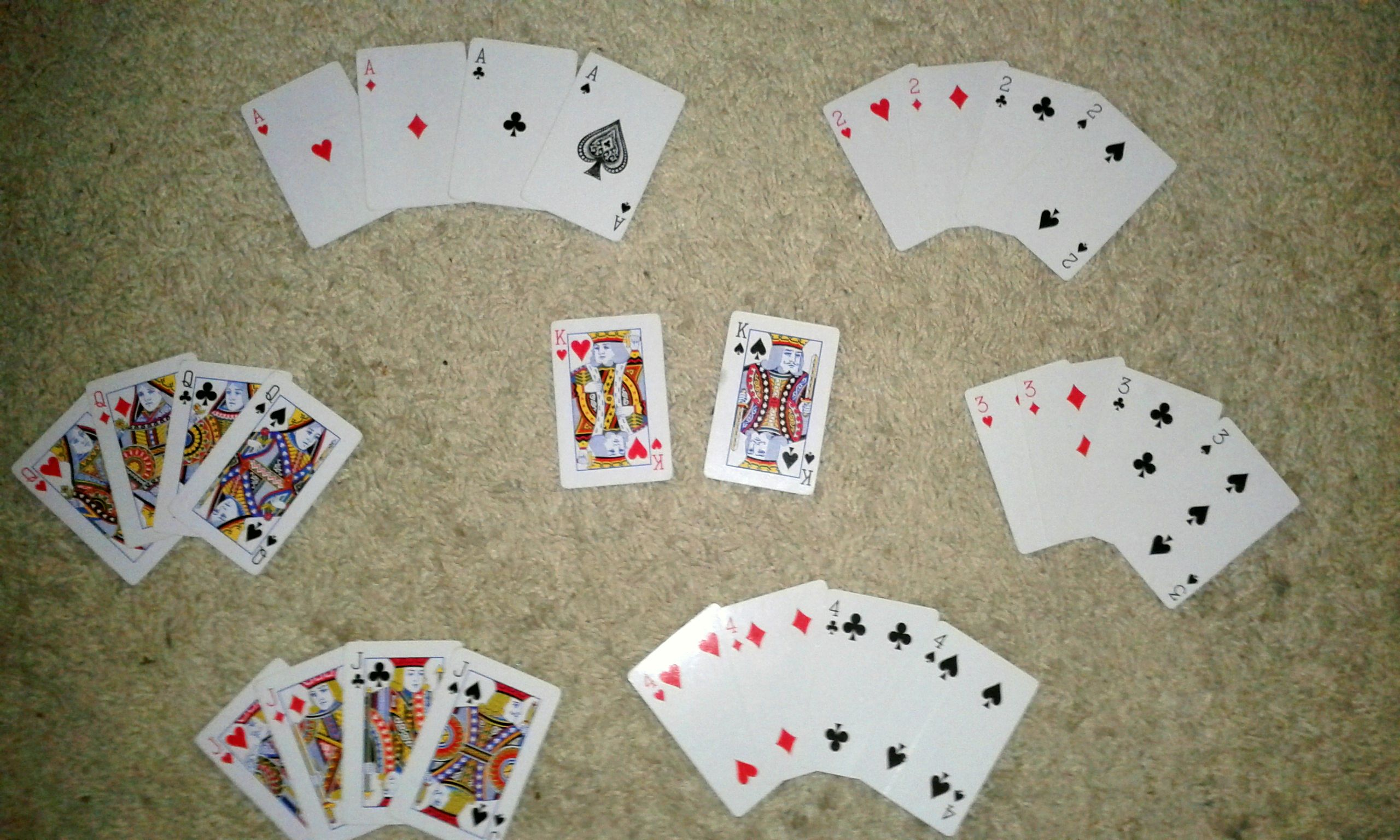
Action cards: aces, twos, threes, fours, jacks, queens, the K♥ and the K♠.

- If a 2 is played, the next player in the sequence must pick up 2 cards unless they have a 2, in which case they can add this to the original 2 and the next player in the sequence must pick up 4 cards, and so on. In the worst-case scenario with a single deck, a player could be forced to draw up to 29 cards (four twos [8 cards] + four threes [12 cards] + up to three jokers counting as threes [9 cards]).
- If a 3 is played, the next player in the sequence must pick up 3 cards unless they have a 3, in which case they can add this to the original 3 and the next player in the sequence must pick up 6 cards, and so on.
- If a 4 is played, the next player in the sequence must miss a go, unless they have a 4, in which case they can add this to the original 4 and the next player in the sequence misses 2 goes, and so on. A player who is blocked by a 4 is skipped entirely — action cards do not take effect on a blocked player; any effect passes instead to the next player in sequence.
- If a Jack is played, the player placing the Jack can call for a non-action card value, which they must hold. If they do not hold the value they are calling, they must call for "any non-action card". The demand lasts for the entire following round — including the player who played the Jack — and can only be changed by another Jack being played (overriding the demand for a different value, or cancelling it entirely). The player in the sequence must either play the card value called or place another Jack down and call a different value.
- The Queen follows the rule "a Queen on anything, anything on a Queen" — it may be played on any card regardless of suit or value (in some versions, this is restricted if the card beneath is an action card), and any card may be played on top of a Queen. In some regional variants, the Q♠ (or additionally the Q♥) blocks the effect of the battle Kings or all action cards.

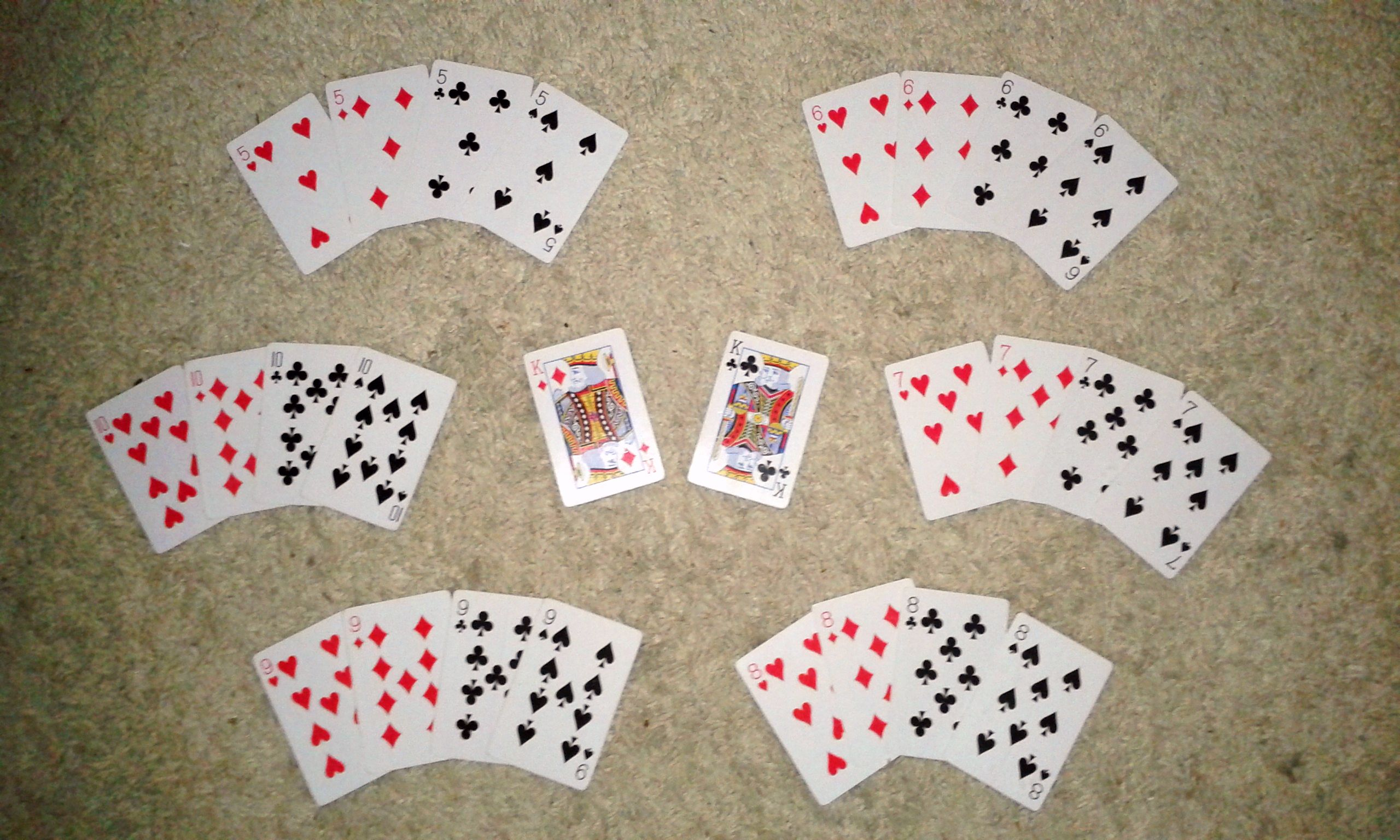
Non-action cards: fives, sixes, sevens, eights, nines, tens, the K♣ and the K♦.

- The battle Kings — K♥ and K♠ — are two Kings whose effect depends on their suit. If a King of Spades is played, the previous player in the sequence must pick up 5 cards; if a King of Hearts is played, the next player in the sequence must pick up 5 cards. Either King may be countered by playing another King of Spades or King of Hearts (cards stack, so the affected player would then draw 10 cards). The battle Kings can additionally be blocked by the non-battle Kings — K♣ and K♦. A 2 or a 3 can also be placed on top of a battle King, adding to the penalty so the affected player draws 7 cards instead of 5.
- If a Joker is played, it acts as a replacement for any card chosen by the player, including action cards — meaning, for example, two effective Kings of Hearts or two effective Kings of Spades can be created this way. Players may choose to exclude jokers from play, or restrict which cards they may replace, in order to reduce the random element of the game.
- If an Ace is played, the player playing the Ace must call a suit different from what is in play. This suit change affects only the next player (unlike a Jack's demand, which covers the entire following round). The Ace player must hold a card of the suit they are calling; if they do not, they must call "free suit" and the next player in sequence can play any suit other than the one already in play. In some variants, the Ace rule does not apply to Queens.

Non-action cards are therefore: fives, sixes, sevens, eights, nines, tens, the K♣, and the K♦.

Multiple action cards can be played at once. For example, player 1 plays three 2s and the next player in the sequence must pick up 6 cards unless they have another 2. This is the same for 3s, 4s, and Kings.

Some variants include additional or modified rules, for example a "five on anything, anything on a five" rule replacing the standard Queen rule, or a special J♠ that can ignore an outstanding demand if it has already been fulfilled by a preceding player — thereby preventing another Jack or Ace from being played in response. In some versions certain rules apply conditionally — most commonly queens may function as non-action cards, and battle kings may lose their special power if the preceding card was a 2 or 3 that was successfully countered.

== Variations ==
=== Romanian variation ===
In Romania, the game is called Macao (or Macaua) and has variations by region. The rules below are common:

- 2s and 3s remain "draw 2" and "draw 3" cards.
- Jokers are wild cards and may be placed regardless of suit. Usually, the black Joker means "draw 5", and the red Joker means "draw 10".
- 4s are cards that block action cards, such as 2s and 3s.
- Aces are "skip a turn" cards.
- 7s are wild cards used to change the suit.

In some restricted versions, players cannot use a 3 on a 2 that does not match the color or suit. In less restricted versions, draw cards can be stacked regardless of color or suit.

=== Romanian variation #2 ===
This is a less common variation which typically does not use wild cards or jokers. Instead, Aces change the suit and 4s do not block. If there are 3 players, two 8s are sometimes removed from the pack and the other two become wild cards (7s).

- If an opponent places 4s, the next player must wait a number of turns equal to the number of 4s placed.
- If an opponent places 3s, the next player must draw cards equal to the total value of 3s placed.
- If an opponent places 2s, the next player must draw cards equal to the total value of 2s placed.

=== Tips for playing Macau ===
1. Keep track of the cards that have been played to know which cards are still in play.
2. Save wild cards for moments when you cannot match the current suit or value.
3. Manage your action cards (such as 2s and 3s) to respond to penalties or to shift game momentum.
4. Use 4s to skip the turn of a player who is close to winning.
5. Try to create runs or sets with your cards to decrease your hand size quickly.
6. Observe the number of cards held by opponents to anticipate when they might call Macau.
7. Balance the risk of drawing a card from the deck against the benefit of holding a stronger hand.
8. Focus on matching the suit in play to stay in the game if your hand is weak.
9. Be aware of the special card rules agreed upon at the start of the game.
10. Stay focused on the sequence of play to avoid missing an opportunity to play a run.

=== Tel-Aviv variation ===
In this version (also known as the London variation), 2 players are dealt 7 cards each, while 3 or more players are dealt 5 cards each. The top card of the deck becomes the first card in the discard pile.

Special Cards:

- Aces and Queens may be played at any time. A Queen changes the suit to whatever suit the queen is. With an Ace, a player may choose a suit of their choice.
- A player may only play 1 card per turn, with the exception of a 5. If a player plays a 5, they may play another card on top of that.
- If a player plays a 2, the next player must pick up 2 cards unless they have another 2.
- If a player plays a 3, the next player must pick up 3 cards unless they have another 3.
- If a player plays the King of Hearts, the next player must pick up 5 cards.

Point system for series play (played to 500):

- 4 to 9 are worth 5 points.
- 10s and face cards are worth 10 points.
- 2s are worth 20, and 3s are worth 30.
- Aces are worth 50 points.
- The King of Hearts is worth 150 points.

=== Easier–harder ===
Players can agree on extra rules to adjust difficulty:

- Easier: 2s and 3s are wild when placed on other draw cards, allowing a 2 to be placed on a 3.
- Harder: 2s and 3s are treated as normal cards for matching purposes but still carry their draw penalty.
- Easier: Cards of the same numeric value may be played in packs at once.
- Harder: 7s used as wild cards can only change the suit to their own suit.

=== Polish variation (Makao) ===
In Poland, the game is widely known as Makao and is recognized as a national variant of Crazy Eights, remaining a staple of informal play. It is frequently played with a full 52-card deck, but house rules often add complexity to the action cards. The rules differ by region and by the source from which players learned the game (such as the internet or books), though the core mechanics and objective remain consistent:

- Jacks: A player may play a Jack to "wish" for a specific card rank (e.g., "I want 10s"). The next player must play that rank or another Jack to change the wish. The demand covers the full following round and is overridden only by another Jack.
- Aces: Function as suit-changers, affecting only the next player rather than the entire following round.
- Stops (4s): Similar to the standard rules, playing a 4 forces the next player to skip a turn; multiple 4s stack.

In some Polish regions, the rule "a five on anything, anything on a five" replaces the standard Queen rule. In others, the J♠ (Jack of Spades) has a special ability to ignore an outstanding demand for a value or suit, provided the demand has already been fulfilled by a previous player — thereby preventing another Jack or Ace from being played in response. In some versions certain rules apply conditionally; most commonly queens may act as non-action cards, and battle kings lose their special power if the preceding card was a 2 or 3 that was countered by the next player.

=== Other versions ===
==== Prší ====
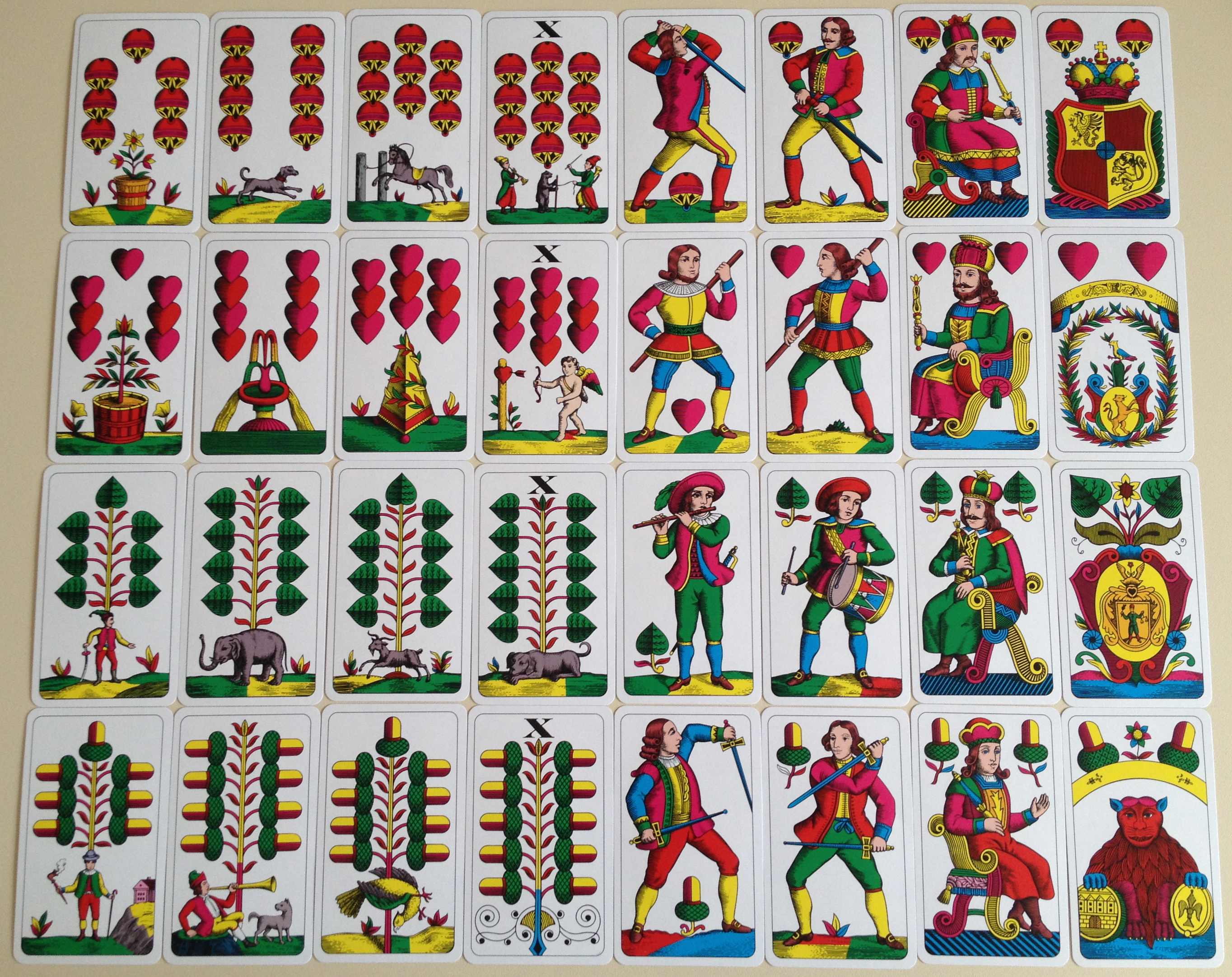
A full deck of the Prague-pattern type

Prší (Czech and Slovak for it's raining) is a version of Macau that arose in the second half of the 20th century and is played in the Czech Republic and Slovakia. It is typically played by two to five players using a 32-card deck (sevens through aces) of the German pattern, or alternatively a standard French deck. The goal is to be the first player to shed all cards — when one player does so, the game ends immediately for all others (unlike the Polish version, in which play continues until a full ranking is established).

Each player receives 4 to 6 cards (depending on regional custom), and the top card of the remaining deck is turned face-up in the centre of the table as the starter card, onto which cards are subsequently discarded. Play proceeds clockwise, beginning with the player to the left of the dealer. On each turn a player places exactly one card, matching either the rank or the suit of the top discard. If no playable card is held, the player draws one card from the stock. When the stock is exhausted, the discard pile (minus the top card) is reshuffled to form a new stock.

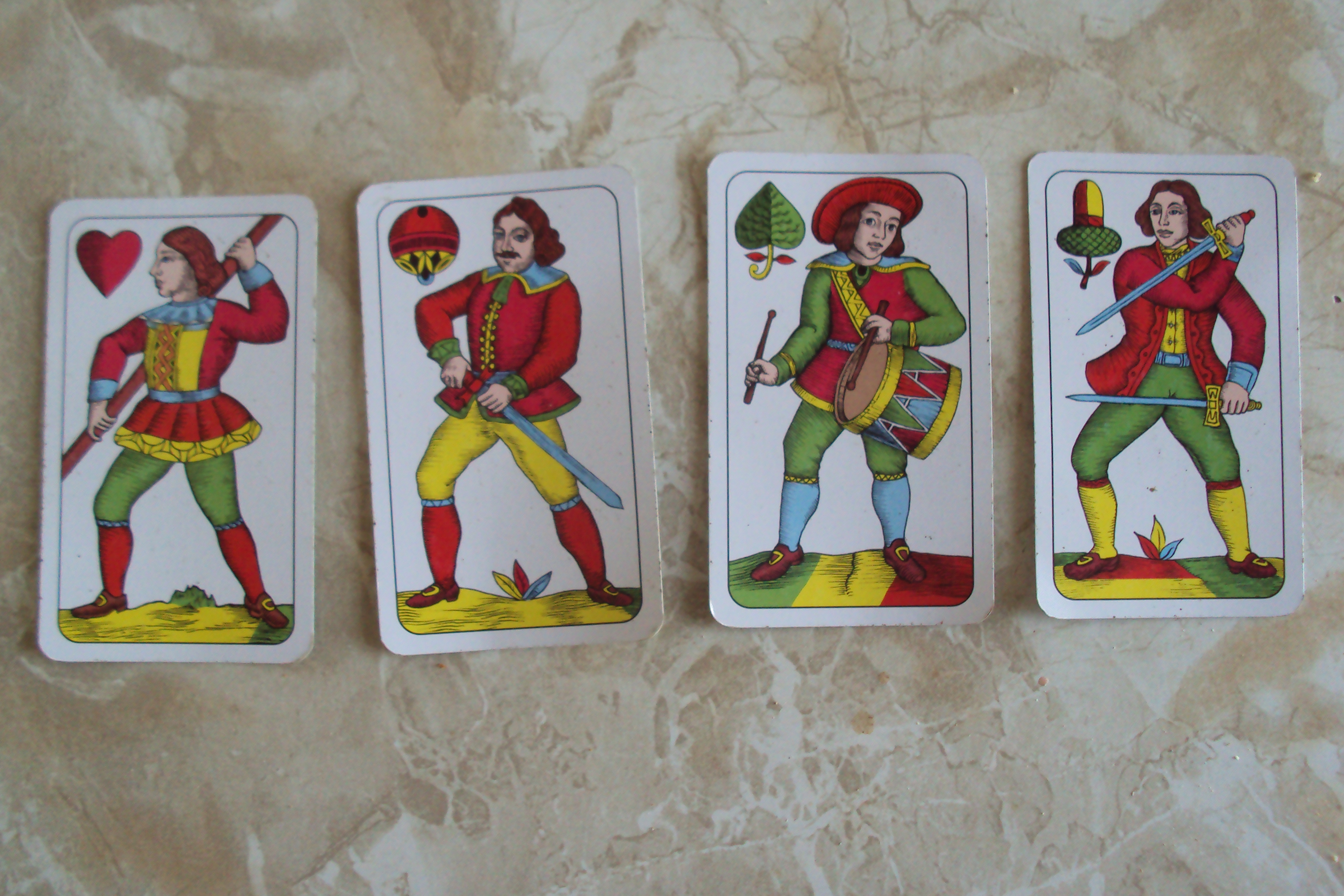
Four Dames (Obers) from a Prague-pattern deck

Action cards in Prší:

- Ace – the next player loses a turn; an Ace may be played in defence, though skipped turns do not stack.
- Queen / Ober – changes the current suit and may be placed on any card regardless of suit or rank; defended by another Queen. If the defending player has neither another Queen nor a card of the newly declared suit, they must draw.
- Seven – the next player draws 2 cards; defended by another Seven, which causes the penalty to accumulate (4 cards for the player after, 6 for the one after that, etc.).

Non-action cards (eights, nines, tens, jacks/unters, and kings) carry no special effect.

When a player goes out, they announce "Prší!". The remaining players score penalty points for cards left in hand:

- Ace – 11 points
- King – 4 points
- Queen / Ober – 3 points
- Jack / Unter – 2 points
- Numbered cards – face value

==== Mau-Mau ====
Mau-Mau is the version of Macau played in Austria and Germany. Rules are similar to the Czech Prší — the main differences are that Mau-Mau may be played with either a 32-card or a full 52-card deck, and the set of action cards is slightly broader. In addition to the cards used in Prší, the eight reverses the direction of play: the next player to act is the one sitting to the right instead of the left. An eight may only be countered by another eight, which restores normal clockwise order. As in Prší, the game ends immediately when one player sheds all cards and declares "Mau-Mau!". The winner scores points equal to the total remaining in opponents' hands:

- Numbered cards – face value
- King and Jack – 10 points each
- Ace – 11 points
- Queen – 50 points

==== 101 ====
101 (Russian: Сто один, Sto odin), also called the Czech Fool (Russian: Чешский дурак, Tscheskij durak), is the Russian version of Macau. Like its Polish counterpart, it has many variants depending on the source of the rules or the region. It is played with a 36-card deck (sixes through aces), or optionally a full deck. The aim is to shed all cards; the player who accumulates 101 or more penalty points loses.

Each player receives five cards; the rest of the deck is placed to one side as the draw pile. The first game is begun by a randomly chosen player; subsequent games are started by the winner of the previous game, who places any chosen card face-up to start the discard pile. In turn, each player must match either the rank or the suit of the top discard, or draw the top card of the stock and — if it matches — play it immediately. If the drawn card does not match, the turn passes. When the stock is exhausted, the discard pile (minus the top card) is reshuffled. Special cards in 101:

- Ace – the next player loses a turn if they have no Ace.
- King of Spades – the next player draws 4 cards and loses a turn.
- Queen – changes the suit in play; may be placed on any card regardless of suit.
- Ten – reverses the direction of play.
- Seven – the next player draws 2 cards if they have no Seven.
- Six – the player who plays it must immediately also play another Six or a card of the same suit; if neither is available, they draw from the stock until a matching card is found.

When a player goes out, the remaining players count penalty points for cards still in hand:

- Ace – 11 points
- King – 4 points
- Queen – 3 points (if the winning card was a Queen, every remaining player scores an additional 20 points; if it was specifically the Queen of Hearts, an additional 40 points; if a player holds only one card and it is a Queen, they score 50 penalty points)
- Jack – 2 points
- Ten – 0 points (10 in some versions)
- All other cards – face value

The player who reaches 101 or more penalty points loses the game.
