= Switch (card game) =

Card game

- Playing an 8 causes the next player to miss their turn.
- Origin: England
- Alternative names: Two Four Jacks, Black Jack
- Type: Shedding-type
- Players: 2+
- Skills: Tactics, Communication
- Deck: French
- Rank (high→low): A K Q J 10 9 8 7 6 5 4 3 2
- Play: Clockwise and Counter-clockwise
- Playing time: Various
- Chance: Medium

Switch (also called Two Four Jacks or Black Jack, or Last Card in New Zealand) is a shedding-type card game for two or more players that is popular in the United Kingdom, Ireland and as alternative incarnations in other regions. The sole aim of Switch is to discard all of the cards in one's hand; the first player to play their final card, and ergo have no cards left, wins the game. Switch is very similar to the games Crazy Eights, UNO, Flaps, Mau Mau or Whot! belonging to the shedding family of card games.

== Game rules ==
Switch is played with a regular, single deck of playing cards, or with two standard decks (shuffled into one) if there is a large number of players.

Players are initially dealt a similar-sized hand of cards (often seven per person), but the exact number may vary depending on how many players are present. The remainder of the deck is placed face down and serves as a "pool" or drawing stack. At the beginning of the game, the topmost card from the "pool” is revealed and, so long as this card is not a trick card, play begins. (Switch may not start with a trick card, and so if the "starting card" is a trick card, cards shall continue to be selected from the pool until a non-trick card is revealed.)

The first to play (generally, the player on the dealer's left) should select from his or her hand a card that matches either, the suit or the rank of the open card (the card that is "top"); for example, on a 9 of spades, only a spade card or a 9 may be played. If a player is not able to place a card, or chooses not to, they must draw one card from the stack, and play it if they are able to; if they cannot, their turn ends.

If the drawing stack is run down and becomes empty, the playing stack or discard pile (except for the topmost card) is shuffled, and placed face down to become the new "pool."

When a player has only one remaining card they must remember to say "last card" aloud before their turn has ended, to inform the other players that they are about to win. If a player should fail to do so before the next player has started their turn they must draw two cards as a penalty.

=== Power cards ===
Some cards are known as "power" or "trick" cards because their being played directly affects the gameplay:

- Ace: Can be played at anytime to change the suit
- 2: If a player places a two (of any suit) down, the next player is required to pick up two cards. One player may not place two 2 cards at the same time. If the next player has a two, they may place it down instead of taking cards, requiring the next player to take four. This continues until a player with no two has to pick up the current total. A player that draws cards after a two has been played is usually not permitted to put any more cards down.
- 4: As twos, but players are required to draw four, eight, twelve or sixteen cards instead.
- Black Jack: Pick up 7 cards unless they can play Red Jack in response.

=== Endgame ===
The first player to get rid of all of their cards wins the game.

If a player has two cards in their hand, they must say "last card" when playing one of them, to announce that they now only hold a single card. Failing to call "last card" (or breaking any other rule) results in a penalty of drawing two cards from the deck.

== Variations ==
=== Black Jack ===
"Black Jack" is the name of a shedding card game which shares its name with the casino card game Blackjack, and is sometimes called 7 Card Blackjack to differentiate itself from the other game. It is a variant of Crazy Eights.

==== Dealing ====
The dealer deals each player 7 cards (or 5 cards if there are more than 4 people), then places a single card face-up on the table and the remainder of the deck in a pile face-down on the table.

A pre-determined method is used to decide which player plays first. It is usually the player left of the dealer who plays first. The game continues from there going clockwise. Play starts from the single card facing up.

==== Player turns ====
- On each turn, the player attempts to place cards from their hand onto the stack.
- A card can only be placed in the stack if it matches either the rank or suit of the top card.
- A player can place consecutive cards of the same suit down to remove more cards.
- If a player cannot take their turn, they pick up a card from the remaining deck.
- If a player makes an error by placing an illegal card down (putting a card or cards down which goes against the rules of the game such as attempting to put a 7H on top of a 8S, or attempting a run containing one or more illegal cards) or putting a card down a wrong time (when it is not their turn, this is an easy mistake to make such as forgetting that the previous player putting an eight down makes them skip their turn), then this is declared a 'blunder' and the offending player must take back the card(s) they attempted to put down and pick up two more cards from the remaining deck as a penalty.
- Once the player has played their turn, they must say "Last card" if they only have one card left. If another player thinks that they can play their cards in one turn they say "cards". If they fail to do so, there is a penalty (see Endgame). An alternate method of doing this is 'knocking'. If a player thinks they can win on his next turn, they must warn the other players by making a knocking noise on the table or by saying 'knocking' (or both). If they fail to do so, there is a penalty.

==== Magic cards ====
Certain cards have special effects on the gameplay.

- Aces: The player who puts down an ace nominates a new suit, which all the players must follow. The ace can be put down at any time, of any suit, it does not have to follow the suit that the last card was, with a run on top of it if possible. It can also be used to block a two.
- Two: The next player is forced to pick up two cards unless they are able to lay another two, black Jack or an ace which makes the next player pick up the cards. Alternatively, a red Jack or an ace can be used to cancel the card pickup.
- Seven: All other cards held by that player in the same suit as the 7 may be played.
- Eight: The next player misses a turn unless they have an eight.
- Black Jack: A Black Jack causes the next player to pick up 5 cards, unless they can follow with another black Jack. If one red Jack is placed, one black Jack is cancelled.
- Red Jack: One red Jack cancels one black Jack.
- Queen: A queen must be covered by a card of any suit or rank.
- King: Reverses order of play.

==== Endgame ====
The first player to get rid of all of their cards wins the game. The game may end once a player has got rid of all of their cards, or the remaining players may continue playing until everyone has got rid of their cards (when done a player is declared to have "got out") bar one player (this player is declared "last place" or "the loser" and may be eliminated if there is an unwieldy number of people wanting to play).

If the player places their last card, but failed to say "last card" at the end of their previous turn, then they must pick up two cards from the remaining deck (even if the player had multiple cards). A player can also declare their final card by 'knocking', usually by tapping the playing table.

==== Black Jack variants ====
- Some variants may include a Joker (usually only one, although the players may opt to include 2 jokers) (some variants make the Joker card a wild card and force the player to draw three cards from the deck)
- The player is not allowed to finish on an ace or any power card
- Multiple cards can be placed on a single turn, where each card matches the previous card in rank or suit. There is no limit to the number of cards which can be played.
- A 3, 7 or 10 is used as the reverse card instead of the king.
- The Queen can be covered by any card, not only one of her suit.
- Runs within a suit are allowed (in both ascending and descending order), for example with a top card of 6♣ it would be possible to play 6♦ 7♦ 8♦ 9♦
- The King, when it is not "reverse", is used as a "got to cover" card, in which, the player placing the king must also place a chosen card from the suit of the king.
- A player can end by placing a sequence of cards down.
- When placing "pick up" cards the black jacks and twos can be placed together giving a maximum pick up number of 18, so a move such as J♠ 2♠ 2♥ 2♦ 2♣ would be a valid and legal move.
- The value of the number of cards required to pick up after a black jack is played varies depending on the number of cards dealt to each player at the beginning of the game.
- Red Jacks do not cancel black Jacks, instead they can be combined with black Jacks. One must pick up three additional cards per red Jack.
- Can be played with two decks of cards if more than five people are playing.
- Is quite similar in several ways to the game Uno.
- The eight is a "play again" card instead of the Queen.

These rules tend to lead to faster play, and can make gameplay more exciting as sometimes a large number of cards can be played in a single turn by taking full advantage of both of these rules in a single turn (for instance with the 6 of clubs on top, it would be possible to play 6♦ 6♥ 6♠ 7♠ 8♠ 9♠ 10♠ J♠ J♣ 10♣ 9♣ in a single turn).

Using the king and queen rules from the above list, it would be possible to have this as a move, (If the 6 of clubs is on the top of the deck, the next player could play K♣ 10♣ J♣ Q♣ 3♣ 5♣ 8♣ 7♣ 7♦ 6♦ 5♦ 5♠ 4♠ 3♠ etc. until they cannot place another card)

=== Irish Switch ===
Irish Switch uses the following power cards:

- 2 the next player is required to pick up two cards. These effects may stack.
- 7: a player may skip a turn once the other player puts down at 7 of any suit, the next player can place another 7 down to make the next player skip, multiple people can put a 7 down, this action happens until no one has a 7, making them skip their turn.
- Jack: a Jack is used in play so the player can reverse to the previous player, one player may put down multiple jacks at the same time, if there are only two players in the game one player will put a jack down, making it reverse to themself, they can then put another card down on top of it.
- King of Hearts: Requires a player to pick up seven cards, unless they have the 2 of hearts. Then they may pick up seven cards and another 2 card makes them pick up nine and so on.
- Ace: Can be placed on any card of the same suit, and change the suit to any.
- Joker: A Joker card can be used in play, but is not necessary for the game. The Joker acts as a replacement card, i.e. it can be any card from any suit.

When a player has only one remaining card they must call it or be penalised.

=== Jacks, Twos and Eights ===
"Jacks Twos and Eights" (J28 for short) evolved from earlier forms of rummy with the intention of being a faster, more complex game.

==== The deck ====
J28 is played with a standard 52-card pack of playing cards or if there is a large number of people playing one game then two packs may be mixed together and dealt as normal.

==== Dealing ====
Dealership alternates from round to round (the dealer to the first round is usually determined by cutting the deck and then the lowest card deals). The dealer deals a seven-card hand to each player. After seven cards are dealt the next card is placed face up in the centre of the table, this is the "discard" pile. The remainder of the pack is placed face down next to the "discard" pile, and is called the "stock". The next non-dealing player to the right of the dealer lays the first card.

==== Play ====
On each turn, a player plays a card or a run of card on to the discard pile. This card must be of the same suit, or the same value, a heart on a heart or a 10 on a 10. Once this card has been laid it is possible for that player to continue laying cards if a run of several cards is possible. There are several possible combinations the run may be formed from:

- The player may lay a set of same value cards, on top of a 10 of hearts they may lay a number of 10s regardless of suit.
- The player may lay a run of numbers either ascending or descending, on top of a 10 of hearts they may lay a 2, 3, 4, 5, of hearts, or a King, Queen, Jack of hearts. The run must not skip numbers, and must be of the same suit as each other and the card they are being laid upon.
- The player may lay a combination of the two above. They may lay a set of same value cards, three 10s then providing that they follow on suit and begin at them next number lay a run of cards, for example. On top of a 10 of hearts a player may lay: 9 of hearts, 9 of spades, 8 of spades, 7 of spades and 7 of clubs.
- If the player is unable to lay any card then the player must pick up a card from the stock pile. If the player is then able to play then they can lay a card down on this go.

==== Game rules ====
There are several rules which apply to certain cards in the game which change how the cards can be laid.

- Jacks can be played at any time on top of any card. Not only can it be played at any time in the game it also allows the player to change the suit of the cards to the one they prefer. For example, if a Jack is played the suit can be changed to hearts, then the player is allowed to lay a heart and any other appropriate cards on that go.
- If a 2 is played then the next player must pick up two cards, unless they can play a 2. This continues around the circle until a player is not able to play a 2. When this happens the player must pick up a number of cards (determined by the number or 2s laid multiplied by 2)
- If an 8 is played the next person in the game must play an 8 also. Again this continues around the circle until a player is unable to lay an eight. This player must then miss a number of goes (determined by the number of 8s laid)
- Another rule is that if a player has an ace of hearts the player next in turn must pick up 5 cards, unless they have an ace of spades, this cancels out the 5 cards they must pick up.

Play continues, until one player no longer has any cards to lay. On a player's last card, “last card” must be said on their previous go in order to allow them to lay the card on their last go. One exception to this is if the player is able to end the game with a run or set of same value cards. The game cannot end on a Jack of any suit, 2 of any suit or 8 of any suit. The winner is the first player to have an empty hand.

=== Take Two ===
Very similar to Switch, but with some changes. Played with a 52 card deck (No jokers) or a 54 card deck (With jokers.)

==== Dealing ====
The dealer deals each player 5 cards, then places a single card face-up on the table and the remainder of the deck in a pile face-down on the table.

The player left of the dealer plays first. The game continues from there going clockwise. Play starts from the single card facing up.

==== Rules ====
The player whose turn it is has to place a card of the same value (e.g. 5♥ on a 5♦) or of the same suit (5♠ on a 3♠). If the player cannot play any card, they must take two cards from the deck. When a player is on their last card, they must say "last card". A player cannot finish on a trick card. If a player cannot finish, they must take two cards from the deck. If a player makes a mistake (e.g. places a card of the wrong suit down), they must fix the mistake and take two cards from the deck.

The game has trick cards like Switch, but fewer of them:

2
if a player places a two down, the next player is required to pick up two cards. Should that player have a two themself, however, they may place it down, requiring the next player to pick up four. If they have a two, they may place it, requiring the next player to pick up six. This may continue until the flow reaches a player who does not have a two in their hand, at which point they are required to pick up the required number of cards.
8
if a player puts an eight down, the next player misses their go.
Jack
The jack can reverse the order of play OR skip a player depending on house rules.
Ace
An ace may be placed regardless of the suit, an ace allowing the person who places it to change the suit.

Once a player runs out of cards, they have won, and the game goes on until there is only one person left.

==== House rules ====
Decided by the host of the game.

- Whether or not placing two or more cards of the same value at once is allowed (placing two 5s in the same turn).
- Whether or not placing an ace requires the same suit.
- Whether a jack, king, or queen skips a player or reverses the order.
- Whether or not jokers are used, if they are the next player must take 5 cards from the deck when they are player. Jokers are rarely used.
- When using an ace of spades it may be placed on either the ace of hearts, or a 2 if any suit.
- whether placing a red Jack cancels one, or all black jacks on the active stack.
- Whether ending on a magic card is allowed.
- Whether or nor Queens or Kings have any powers at all.
- Whether or not jacks can be placed on 2s or vice-versa.

== See also ==
- Craits
- Screw Your Neighbour
- Whot!
- Crazy Eights
- Mau-Mau (card game)
