= Yaniv (card game) =

Nepalese card game popular in Israel

Yaniv (Hebrew: יניב), also known as Yusuf, Jhyap, Jafar, aa’niv, Minca or Dave, is a card game popular in Israel. It is a draw and discard game in which players discard before drawing a new card and attempt to have the lowest value of cards in hand.

== Gameplay ==
Yaniv is played with a 54-card deck composed of standard playing cards. The game is divided into multiple rounds, with a total score tally kept between rounds. The game requires a minimum of two players but is typically played between a group of two and five players. Up to eight people can comfortably play yaniv together; however, as the player count increases, the pace of the game slows. When there are four or more players, some people prefer to use two card decks shuffled together to avoid running out of cards. Regardless of the number of players, some variants use multiple decks. Each card in the deck is assigned a value. An ace is worth a single point while cards two through ten are worth their face value. Face cards (J, Q, K) are worth 10 and jokers are worth zero points.

Card Rank	Point Value
Joker	0
Ace	1
2–10	Equal to card rank
Face card	10

=== Objective ===
The objective of the game is to earn the fewest points in each round. The player with the fewest points at the end of the game is the winner.

Each round in the game ends when a player declares "Yaniv!" Each player's score is calculated from their remaining cards. The player with the lowest score wins the round and receives no points for the round. Other players record their corresponding scores for the round.

=== Structure of a round ===
==== Dealing ====
At the beginning of a round, each player in the game is dealt five cards face down, rotating clockwise from the dealer's left. The remaining cards are placed in a draw pile in the center face down. If the dealer should deal extra cards, each player may choose which card to dispose of on to the draw pile. The top card from the stack is turned face up. It is then placed to the side to begin the discard pile.

==== Play ====
The game proceeds clockwise (optional). Since the starting player in each round has an advantage, the starting player in the first round must be chosen at random. In subsequent rounds, the winner of the previous round becomes the starting player.

Players have two options for their turn: They may either play one or more cards or call "Yaniv!" When playing cards, the player may discard a single card or a single set of cards, placing them into the discard pile. The player must then draw a card from the draw pile. Alternatively, the player may choose to take the card played by the previous player from the discard pile. However, if the previous player played a multi-card set, only the first or the last card in the set may be chosen. Note that the two jokers in the deck are taken into consideration.

If the drawing deck is empty and no one has yet called "Yaniv!", then all cards of the free stack, excluding the last player's drop, are shuffled and placed face down as a new deck.

==== Sets ====
A player may discard any of the following sets of cards:

- A single card
- Two or more cards of the same rank
- Three or more cards of consecutive ranks in the same suit. Note that aces are considered low for the purposes of sequences (i.e., an ace can be used before a 2, but not after a king)

==== Calling "Yaniv!" ====
At the beginning of their turn, instead of playing cards, a player may call "Yaniv!" (in Nepal, players call "Jhyap") if their current score (the sum of all card values in the player's hand) is less than an agreed-upon value; this value is often 5, but may be significantly higher. When a player calls "Yaniv!," the round ends, and all players reveal their card totals. If the player who called "Yaniv!" has the lowest card total, they score 0 points; however, if another player has a total less than or equal to the calling player's total (a situation often called "Asaf"), the calling player scores points equal to their card total plus 30 penalty points. All other players, regardless of whether their card totals are lower than the calling player's total, score points equal to their card totals. If a player calls “Yaniv!” out of turn, a penalty of plus 30 will be added to their total, and the other players will receive a score of 0. The winner of the round is the player with the lowest card total (not necessarily the player who called "Yaniv"), they become the dealer and the starting player for the next round.

=== Ending the game ===
A player's total score is the sum of their points from all previous rounds. A player is eliminated from the game once their total score exceeds an agreed upon point limit, which is usually set to 200. The specific limit is determined at the start of the game.

- Variation 1: The last remaining player is declared the winner.
- Variation 2: The game stops as soon as at least one player is eliminated. The winner is the remaining player with the lowest total score.

== Common variations ==
- In some variations, aces are counted as both low and high for the purposes of sets.
- It is common practice in Yaniv, to cut a player's score in half if it hits a multiple of 50 such as 50 or 100. Additionally, in some versions of Yaniv, when a player's score hits an exact multiple of 50 (50, 100, 150 or 200), it is reduced by 50.
- Some players may choose to instigate a punishment if "Yaniv" is called and the sum of the caller's cards is greater than seven. Examples of punishments include immediate elimination from the game, being forced to draw three additional cards, or having to swap cards with the first person who requests a swap. Others choose to let the game continue as usual.
- Instead of playing until all players but one is eliminated, some games may end as soon as a player crosses the point limit. In this case, the winner is the player with the lowest score when the game ends.
- In a standard deck of cards, both jacks are pictured from a side angle, where only one eye is visible. Each can be referred to as a “One Eyed Jack” or more commonly abbreviated to a “One Eye” and are considered the best scoring cards in the game.
- A common variation - in particular suitable for smaller groups of people (fewer than four) - is to play with three instead of five cards, which speeds up the game significantly. It is known as "Speedy Yaniv" or "Yan". If four or fewer people are playing it is common to use a standard 54 card deck that is split in half (i.e. use only two full suits and only one joker). All other rules stay the same, apart from when a player has five or fewer points, the player has to declare "Yan" instead of "Yaniv". If a player calls "Yaniv" instead, they earn an additional penalty of 30 points.
- Instead of only being able to only take cards from a run or set from the ends, you can select from any of the cards laid by the previous player
- Instead of the round being over immediately after a player calls Yaniv, a variation includes all other players getting a final turn to play. This allows for high cards to be discarded and additional strategy if you know someone has just picked up a low card as they could be forced to discard it, but also the risk that another player would be then able to pick up that low card.

== Origin ==
The Israeli backpackers community, where the game is most popular, attribute the invention of the game to two backpackers, one named Yaniv and the other Asaf (as both are common given names for males in Israel). It is said that the two invented the game while backpacking through East Asia (sometimes South America) and wanting to find a better way to pass the time on long waits in train stations and long bus rides.

While it may be popular in Israel, additional accounts indicate that Nepal is where the game originates from, and is known as Jhyap.

== See also ==
- Rummy
