= Taki (card game) =

Israeli card game similar to Uno

Logo

TAKI (Hebrew: טאקי) is a card game developed by Israeli game producer Haim Shafir. The game is an advanced variant of Crazy Eights (which is played with regular deck of playing cards), played with a special card deck and extended game options. In its basic form it resembles UNO which was published in the late 70's. It was introduced in 1983 by Shafir Games. The game cards were designed by Israeli artist Ari Ron.

The word "Taki" is the Japanese word for waterfall, as playing the Taki card lets the player pile on cards of the same colour.

== Game overview ==
Each player follows the preceding card, adding to the discard pile on the table, with a card of the same color or figure. Special cards may change the direction of play, skip a player's turn, make other players draw cards, change the color or allow a player to discard more than one card. The game includes 112 cards (2 identical sets of 56). The object of the game is to discard all the cards in your hand.

== Rules ==
The cards are shuffled and each player receives eight. The rest of the deck becomes the draw pile. The top card in the draw pile is turned over and placed face up next to the draw pile to form a discard pile. The upper card of the discard pile is called the Leading Card. The youngest player goes first. Starting clockwise, each player discards a card (or cards) onto the leading card, by (a) matching its color; or (b) matching its number or figure; or (c) using a SuperTaki, Switch Color, or King card. A player who cannot play draws one card from the draw pile. It may be used only in the next round. A player who is left with one card in their hand must announce "Last card!". If they fail to do so before the next player made their move, they draw 4 cards from the draw pile. The game ends when the first player has discarded their last card.

== Special Cards ==
All the cards which are not regular number cards are Action Cards. An Action Card can affect the player who uses it, the next player or all the players. These cards are the heart of the game and the key to winning.

- Stop - The next player loses their turn.
- 2 Plus - Forces the next player to draw 2 cards or discard another 2+ which forces the next player to draw 4 or follow with a 2+ as well, etc. The player who cannot follow with a 2+ must draw 2 cards for every 2+ card which has been played. After they collected the cards, the last 2+ card in the discard pile is free to be used as a color or a number.
- Switch Direction - Reverses the direction of the play. NOTE: Many people think that the card gives another turn while playing with two players, although that is wrong.
- Switch Color - Allows the user to determine the color to be played by the next player. This card may be played at any time except after +2 which is still active.
- TAKI – Discarding a "TAKI" card allows a player to follow with all the cards of the same color as the TAKI. NOTE: You may NOT play any other colors during a Taki run except the color of the leading Taki card.

A TAKI card must be closed at the end of its use by declaring "Closed TAKI!" after the last card. If the player does not close the TAKI, it is considered still "Open" and the next player may use it to get rid of all their cards of the same color. The TAKI remains open until one of the players who made use of it declares "Closed TAKI" or if a card of a different color has been played.

- SuperTaki - A wild TAKI which is the colour of the leading card's colour.
- Crazy Card (discontinued in 2011) - Forces all the players to pass their cards to the player sitting next to them in the direction chosen by the user. This card is transparent; therefore the leading card after a crazy card has been played remains the one underneath it. The direction of the play after a crazy card has been played is the direction of the switch.
- Plus - This card forces the user to play again. If the player cannot play another card he must draw.
- +3 - A card added a few years after the game's release. When placed, it forces every other player besides the player that placed it to draw 3 cards. A few years after the card's release, it was discontinued and replaced with the "+3 rule", which allows a 3 card and Plus card of the same color to be placed together in one turn force the other players to draw 3 cards. In 2015 the card was added again alongside the "Break 3" card.
- Break +3 - Can be placed without wasting a turn anytime one of the players places a +3 card, even if it's not the placer's turn. It reverses the effects of the +3 card and makes the player who placed the +3 to draw 3 cards instead.
- King card (originally not included) - the King card grants the person who plays it an additional turn with no limitations on the cards, effectively resetting the game.

== End of the game ==
The first player to empty their hand is the winner. The winner plays the first card in the next round.

== Scoring points ==
The points scored are penalty points. At the end of each round the winner scores (-100) points. All the others score the sum of the cards remaining in their hands as follows: For each Number Card - The value of the card. For each Action Card - As listed for each Action Card. After 6 rounds, the points are counted up and the winner is the one with the lowest score.

== See also ==
- Israeli inventions and discoveries
- Rummikub
