= Gou Ji =

Card game played in Qingdao, China

Gou Ji (simplified Chinese: 够级; traditional Chinese: 夠級; pinyin: gòu jí) is a card game played in Qingdao, China. It was developed in Licang District during 1962 – 1963.

Gou Ji is played among six people with four packs of poker cards. The objective of the game is to be the first player left with no cards.
