= Screw your neighbour =

Screw your neighbour is the alternative name of several entirely different card games:

- Ranter go round
- Cuckoo (card game)
- Crazy eights
- Oh hell
- Contract rummy
- Sergeant major (card game)

It should not be confused with another card game called beggar-my-neighbour.
