= Whot! =

Card game

Whot
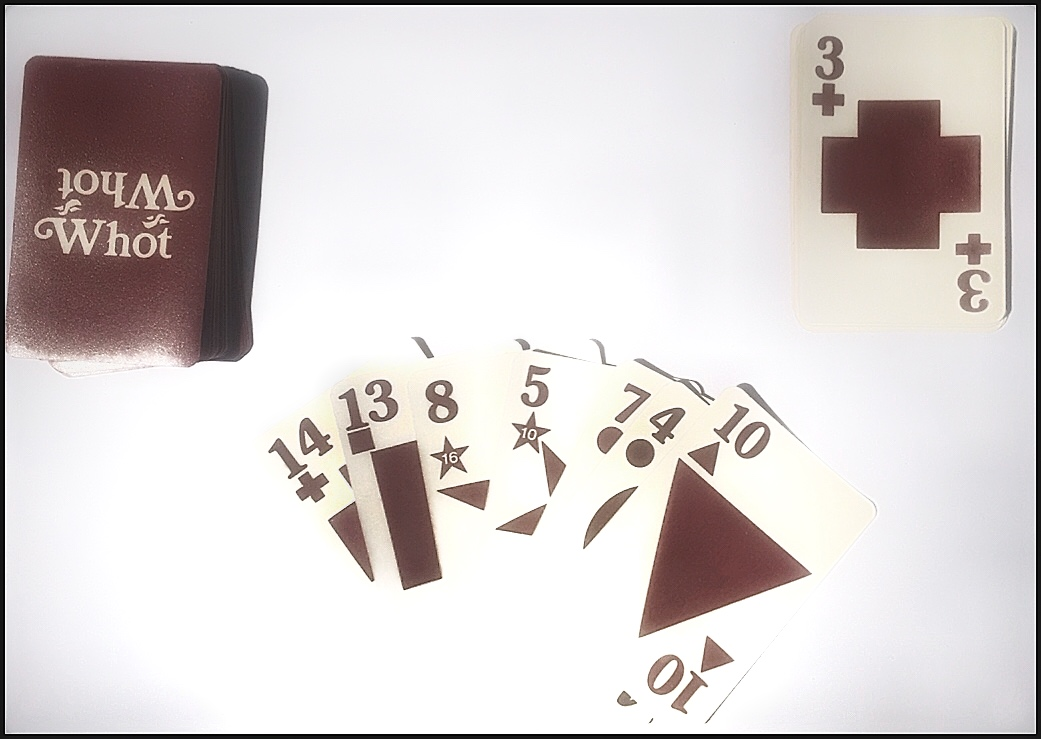
- Whot cards (Nigerian version)
- Origin: England
- Alternative names: Whot!
- Publisher: W H Storey & Co; Waddingtons; Winning Moves
- Type: Shedding
- Players: 2+
- Skills: Hand management
- Cards: 54
- Playing time: Varies
- Chance: High

Related games
- Crazy Eights • Uno • Switch • Mau-Mau

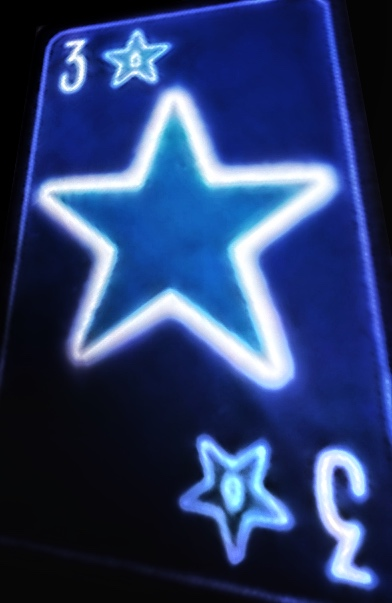
3-Star Whot card (English version)

Whot! is a fast-paced strategic card game played with a non-standard deck in five suits: circles, crosses, triangles, stars and squares. It is a shedding game similar to Crazy Eights, Uno or Mau-Mau and was one of the first commercial games based on this family.

The game has been adapted into different formats, the most popular of which in Africa is the Nigerian Whot Game, which has been described as Nigeria's national card game.

== Origins ==
The game was invented by William Henry Storey a game designer and printer from Southend-on-Sea, England. Storey trademarked Whot in 1935, and it was originally published by the company W.H. Storey & Co. Ltd. of Croydon.

The game was acquired by Waddingtons, a British card game manufacturer, and it was popular in Britain in the 1950s and 1960s, and printed until the 1990s. The name of the game is given an exclamation mark ("Whot!") on later packs. The game is currently distributed by Winning Moves.

== Gameplay ==
=== Deck ===
A standard Whot deck contains 54 cards from 5 suits: circles, squares, triangles, stars and crosses. These are numbered between 1 and 14 although not all numbers are included for each suit. The remaining 5 cards are special cards called "Whot" cards and designated with the number 20.

Cards included in the deck
Suit	Card number											
Circles	1	2	3	4	5	7	8	10	11	12	13	14
Triangles	1	2	3	4	5	7	8	10	11	12	13	14
Crosses	1	2	3		5	7		10	11		13	14
Squares	1	2	3		5	7		10	11		13	14
Stars	1	2	3	4	5	7	8					
5 "Whot" cards numbered 20

=== General rules ===
To start, a dealer shuffles the deck and deals six cards to each player. The top card from the deck is placed face up to serve as the "call card" (a base on which other cards are played), and what remains of the deck is placed face down between the players as the draw pile.

In turn each player must either play a card onto the call card with the same symbol or number as the call card, play a "Whot" card, or draw the top card from the draw pile. Players do not have to play a card, but if they don't they must still take from draw pile. The special "Whot" card can be played onto any call card, and allows the player to choose which symbol is used for the next player's turn.

The game continues until a player plays their last card, and they are the winner of the round. Play may be extended over multiple rounds by scoring. Once a player has played their last card all other players score points from counting up the value of the cards remaining in their hands. Players may then be eliminated from the game once passing a certain cumulative score, or the winner may be the player with the lowest cumulative score over multiple rounds.

== Nigerian rules ==
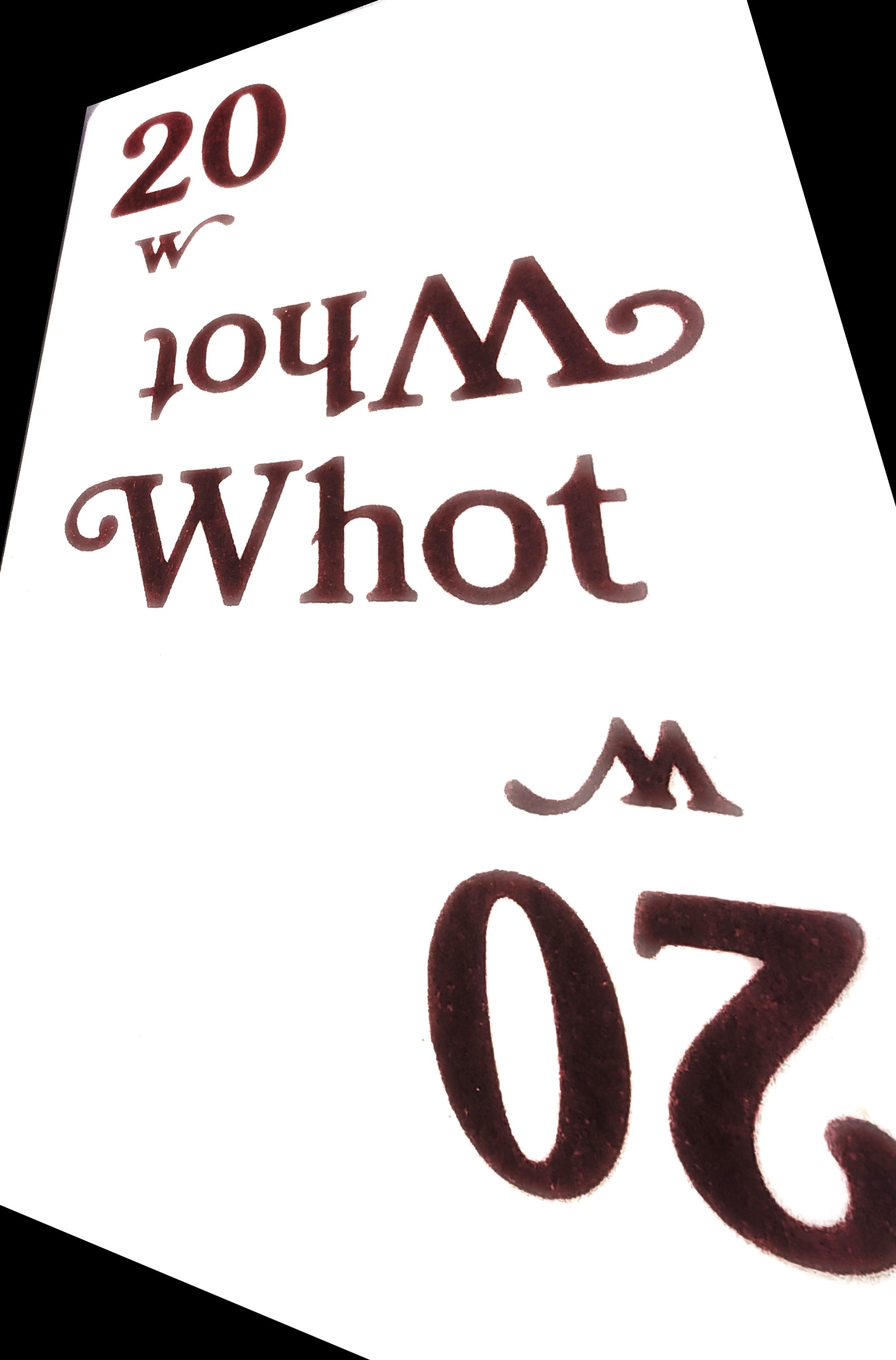
Whot card (Nigerian version)

Under Nigerian rules, how many cards each player gets at the start is agreed between the players. It is usually three to six cards per player given from the mixed draw-pile called market in a way that no player can see the other's cards. The winner is the first player not to hold any cards. The last is the player whose card values add up to the highest number. In the case of "star-cards", the small number in the star is counted.

Usually every player has 10 seconds to play a card. Other time lengths can be agreed between the players. If a player does not play a card within that time, the player is demanded by the other players to pick a card from the market for waiting too long. Then it is the next player's turn. The players do not use a timer or look at their watches every few seconds, but react when the waiting time feels too long. The time window prevents a player from not playing when the player will probably end up last or when another player is close to winning.

On your turn, you either play a card or you pick a card. When you pick a card, it is the next players turn. Whot! is normally played clockwise (next player is on the left side), but the direction can change as part of a playing rule that the players agreed on. See "2-card" and "5-card" description below.

=== Card functions ===
==== Star-cards ====
A "star-card" has two numbers. A number outside of the star and a number inside the star. (The number inside the star equals two times the number outside). When a "star-card" is played only the number outside of star is relevant. When the value of a "star-card" is counted only the number inside the star is relevant. (Of course a "star-card" can also be played unto any other star-card" that does not force you to pick a card.)

==== Non-defensible cards ====
There are three cards that cannot be defended against:

- "14-card" (General market): All other players must pick one card each from the market (draw-pile) and the player that played the "14-card" can play again.
- "1-card" (Hold on – skips all other players): All other players are skipped and the player that played the "1-card" can play again with the same shape or number of the “1-card”
- "8-card" (Skips the next player): The "8-card" is similar to the "1-card" if there are only two players (left).

==== Two and five cards ====
The 2-card and 5-card have special functions in Nigerian Whot. The 2-card is called "Pick 2", and the 5-card is called "Pick 3".

- "2-card" (Pick 2) – Defended with a "2-card": The next player must pick two cards from the top of the market (draw-pile) unless the player plays a "2-card" as well.
- "5-card" (Pick 3) – Defended with a "5-card": The "5-card" is similar to the "2-card". The next player must pick three cards from the top of the market (draw-pile) unless the player plays a "5-card" as well.

If the "2-card" is defended, the third player has to pick four cards from the market unless the third player plays a "2-card" as well. This goes on until a player doesn't play, because the player doesn't have a "2-card" or doesn't want to play it. Then that player must pick two cards for every "2-cards" that was played. For example, if four "2-cards" were played in a row then the player that can't or doesn't want to play a "2-card" has to pick eight more cards from the top of the market (draw-pile). A "5-card" is similar to a "2-card" except that the player that can't or doesn't want to defend against a "5-card", by playing another "5-card", has to pick three cards from the market for every "5-card" that was played in a row.

==== 20-Whot card ====
Another special card is the "Whot-card".

- "Whot-card" (Symbol-change) - Defended with a "Whot-card: You can change the card-symbol of the call-card that another player demanded by playing a "Whot-card" and demanding for a call-card-symbol that you want. For example, to change the call-card from circle to triangle. A player must pick a card from the top of the market if the player doesn't have the symbol demanded by the "Whot-card" player.

==== Change of direction rule ====
Before the game starts the players can agree to allow the option of changing the playing direction e.g. from clockwise to anticlockwise when a "2- or 5-card" is played. This opens the possibility to attack the player on your other side if that player is close to winning. In this case it is said out loud: "Pick two and change direction" or "Pick three and change direction".

=== Card declarations ===
If you play your card X, you must say out loud (To inform the other players):

- 1-card: say: "Hold on"
- 2-card: say: "Pick two", (Optional: "Pick two and change direction")
- 5-card: say: "Pick three", (Optional: "Pick three and change direction")
- 8-card: say: "Skip", "Suspend" or "Suspension"
- 14-card: say: "General market"
- (Second-to-last card: say: Semi-last card – said only in some game variations)
- For the Last card: you must say "Last card"
- when ending with the Last card: say: "Check up"

There are consequences if you fail to say the correct response to your card. They are:

- If you fail to say "Last card" before the next player has played, you have to pick two more cards from the market (draw-pile).
- If you fail to say "Check up" in the moment you place your last card on the table and the next player continues playing, then you have to pick two more cards from the market and the game continues.
- Failing to say "Pick two", "Pick three", "Skip / Suspend" or "General market" does not have consequences but it contributes to the liveliness of the game if they are spoken out loud.

=== Empty market rules ===
When all cards have shifted from the market (draw-pile) into the hands of the players and into the call-card pile, then all cards underneath the call-card are removed leaving only the call-card. The removed cards are shuffled (mixed). Now the shuffled pile is placed face down onto the table to be used as the new market. If there are many players, (four or more), it is advisable to mix two Whot-card decks into one and so doubling the amount of cards. Then the players will not run out of market-cards (draw-pile cards) too quickly.

=== Strategy ===
Strategically, it is inadvisable to play a "2-card" if you think that all other players have "2-cards" as well and you can't defend yourself with another "2-card". If that were the case, you would have to pick two cards from the market for every "2-card" that was played in a row. Equally for the "5- (Pick three) card". This would be a disadvantage for you because you can only win if you are the first to get rid of all your cards. It is generally advisable to keep your "2- and 5-cards" to be able to defend. Especially if the other players hold a lot of cards and therefore probably have "2- and 5-cards" themselves. It is generally advisable to play your "2- and 5-cards" if the other players hold a small amount of cards, to prevent them from winning. If you pay attention to how many "2- and 5-cards" have been played you can estimate the risk of playing your own "2- or 5-card".

If a player has very few cards left, (one or two cards), then it's advisable to use a "Whot-card" and demand for a symbol that the player probably doesn't have, to prevent the player from winning. Otherwise demand for a symbol of which you have the most cards, so you can get rid of them. It is often helpful to demand a symbol of which you have "14-cards", "1-cards" or "8-cards", so you can play twice or more times in a row or skip the next player. A "Whot-card" can be played onto any other card that doesn't force you to pick cards from the market (draw-pile). So if your last card is a "Whot-card" it is easier for you to win.

It is advisable to play the cards with the highest values first. Because the smaller the added up values of your cards are, the more likely you will not be the last when the game ends.

It often happens that players with a lot of cards can get rid of them quickly and players that were close to winning end up with a lot of cards a few turns later. This is because the player with a lot of cards normally has many attacking cards and gets more chances of playing them, while the player with few cards is less likely to be able to defend and is less likely to have a card that can be played onto the call-card.

=== DOUBLE DECKING ===
If there are multiple players involved (two or more), it is advisable to play a combination of two or more Whot-cards of similarity, such that the call-card shares number with the first card played then other cards can now be played. This is the 'Double decking' rule. It is a strategy used by players to reduce the number of cards held by the player. This is done by playing different cards of the same number after each other. Note: The call-card must rhyme with the first card played when double decking, and that there must be a Pre-game agreement between the players. The main essence of double decking is to provide opportunity for a change in the shape of the call-card of a particular shape. Example; Two players are playing, and the call-card is '4 circle'. If the player does not have a circle', but the player has a '4 triangle' and '4 star', and other 'star-cards', in order to change it to the player's favor, the player would play the '4-triangle' card then the '4-star' card would be played immediately after this. Although (before the game starts), the players may agree amongst themselves if the double decking would be done by playing different cards of the same number or playing different cards of the same shape played successively (just for the fun of it).

- Please note that double decking is meant to give room for a change in shape by playing different card of the same number (of which the first card is played to match with the call card, and the other double decked cards are played in an arrangement to fit the most favorable shape the player has).

=== Examples ===
==== Example one ====
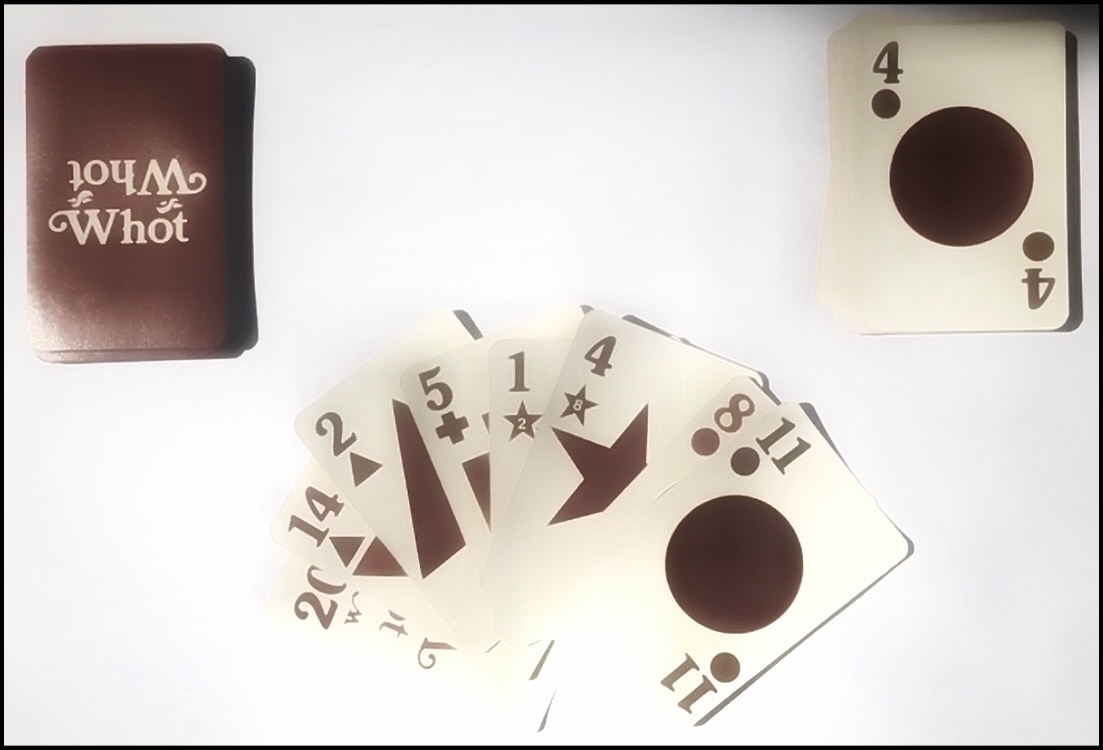
Nigerian playing rules (example one)

In example one, "4-circle" is the call-card. The player can play either "11-circle", "8-circle", "4-star" or the "20-Whot-card" by laying it on "4-circle". If "8-circle" is played the player on the left side (in clockwise play) is skipped (left out) and it's the next players turn. If the "Whot-card" is played the player can choose the symbol that the next player must play.

==== Example two ====
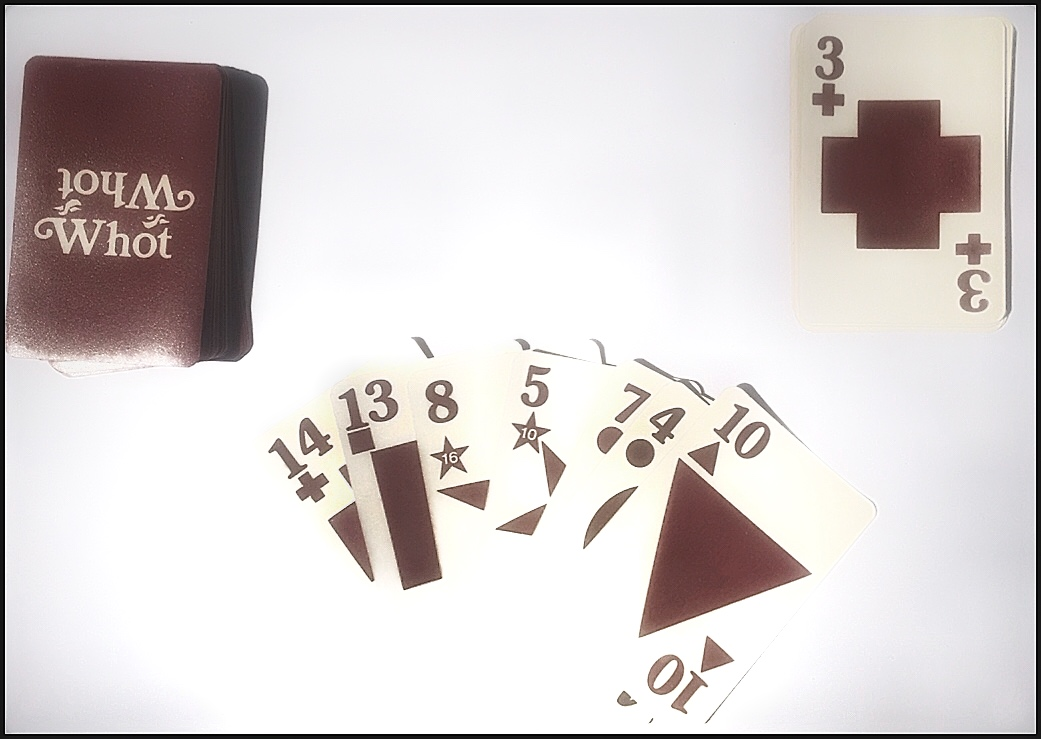
Nigerian playing rules (example two)

In example two, "3-cross" is the call-card. The player can play "14-cross", (by laying it on "3-cross"), forcing all other players to pick one card each from the market (draw-pile) and skip their turns, but the "14-cross"-player can not follow up by either playing another 14-card or a cross-card and therefore has to pick a card from the market as well.

=== Online versions ===
These are Nigerian versions of Whot that are playable online:

- Whot King
- Whot Africa
- Naija Whot
- Waje Game
- Whot! AI

== English rules ==
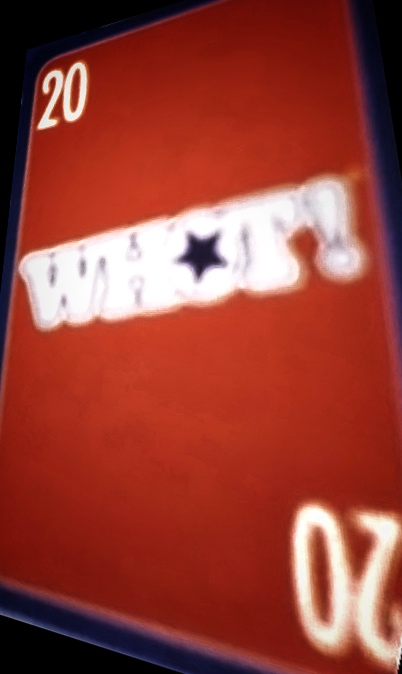
Whot card (English version)

Under English rules, each player gets six cards at the start, given from the mixed draw-pile in a way that no player can see the other's cards. The winner is the first player that doesn't hold any cards whereas players whose card values add up to 100 or more must leave the game and the next round continues without them.

On your turn, you either play a card or you pick a card. When you pick a card, it is the next players turn. The playing direction at the start is clockwise, (next player is on the left side), but a change of direction can be demanded when a "20-Whot card" is played.

=== Card functions ===
==== Star cards ====
A "star-card" has two numbers. A number outside of the star and a number inside the star. (The number inside the star equals two times the number outside). When a "star-card" is played only the number outside of star is relevant. When the value of a "star-card" is counted only the number inside the star is relevant. (Of course a "star-card" can also be played unto any other "star-card).

This is different when you are playing "Knock-out Whot" (See description at topic: Strategy).

==== Straights ====
If you have cards in ascending or descending order you can play them in a row by skipping (leaving out) all the other players. This is called a straight. Any card (except the "Whot-card"), that can be played onto the call-card, can be the first card of the straight.

It can be agreed between the players if a straight should only be allowed for cards with the same symbol or if the symbol doesn't matter.

- Example one: Play cards: 2,3,4,5 in a row while skipping all other players.
- Example two: Play cards: 13,12,11 in a row while skipping all other players.

==== Whot card ====
The "Whot-card" has three functions that can be defended by playing another "Whot-card".

- Symbol-change: You can change the card-symbol of the call-card that another player demanded by playing a "Whot-card" and demanding for a call-card-symbol that you want. For example, to change the call-card from circle to triangle. A player must pick a card from the top of the draw-pile if the player doesn't have the symbol demanded by the "Whot-card" player.
- Direction-change: The "Whot-card" player can demand a change of the playing direction e.g. from clockwise to anticlockwise. This opens the possibility to demand for a symbol that the player on your other side probably doesn't have, if that player is close to winning.
- Skip the next player: The "Whot-card" player can demand that the next player is skipped (left out). If there are only two players (left) then the "Whot-card" player can play a second time in a row.

=== Empty draw-pile rules ===
When all cards have shifted from the draw-pile into the hands of the players and into the call-card pile, then all cards underneath the call-card are removed leaving only the call-card. The removed cards are shuffled (mixed). Now the shuffled pile is placed face down onto the table to be used as the new draw-pile. If there are many players, (four or more), it is advisable to mix two Whot-card decks into one and so doubling the amount of cards. Then the players will not run out of draw-pile cards too quickly.

=== Strategy ===
Strategically, it is advisable to keep cards that could help you create a straight (cards in ascending or descending order), so you can play multiple times in a row and skip the other players.

If a player has very few cards left, (one or two cards), then it's advisable to use a "Whot-card" and demand for a symbol that the player probably doesn't have, to prevent the player from winning. Otherwise demand for a symbol of which you have the most cards, so you can get rid of them. It is often helpful to demand a symbol that is the first card of a straight. A "Whot-card" can be played onto any other card. So if your last card is a "Whot-card" it is easier for you to win.

It is advisable to play the cards with the highest values first. Because the smaller the added up values of your cards are, the more likely you will not be the last when the game ends.

==== Knock-out Whot ====
This is the name of a Whot variation where it is advisable to get rid of your "star cards" as soon as possible. You can play your "star card" if the call-card shows a star or any of the numbers on your star card. (Either the number outside the star, or the number inside the star). Just like in regular Whot variations, the "star cards" count double, but the difference is the way the added up value of your cards are counted, when the game ends.

If you have one "star card" left among the cards that you hold, then the entire added up value of all your cards is doubled.

If you have two or more "star cards" left among the cards that you hold, then the entire added up value of all your cards is taken times four.

== Variations ==
In later versions of the game, playing a "Whot" card also allows the player to choose to reverse the direction of play, or force the next player to miss a turn.

Players might also be allowed to play multiple cards in a single turn when completing a "straight" (a run of cards of the same shape).

The impact of star cards on scoring and gameplay can also be modified. Players double their entire score for each star card remaining in their hand at the end of play, but are also able to play star cards using either the number in the top left or the doubled number written in the star.

Other cards might also be assigned special features. In one variant these special features include:

Card number	Name	Function
1	Hold On	Every player other than the one who played the card loses a turn and the card player plays again
2	Pick Two	The next player draws two cards from the deck and loses their turn
3	Suspension	When played, the next player loses their turn
14	General Market	Every other player draws a card from the deck and loses a turn

In another variant these special features include:

Card number	Name	Function
1	Hold On	Every player other than the one who played the card loses a turn and the card player plays again
4	General Market	Every other player draws a card from the deck and loses a turn
7	Pick Two	The next player draws two cards from the deck and loses their turn
8	Suspension	When played, the next player loses their turn

Some variants of the game include:

Card number	Name	Function
5	Pick Three	The next player draws three cards from the deck and loses their turn
