= Crazy Eights =

Card game

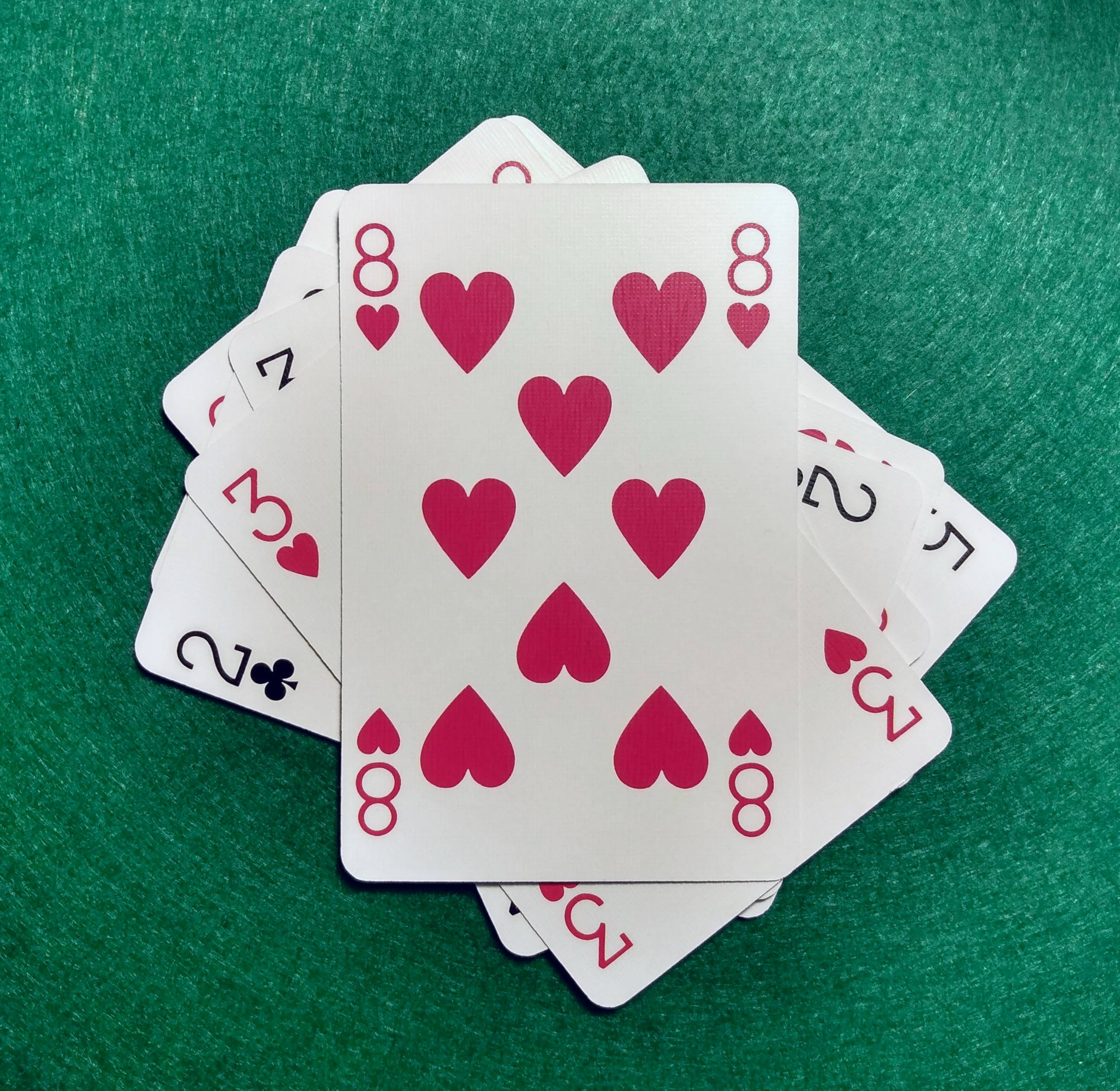
- In Crazy Eights, playing an 8 card will change the current suit of the game.
- Type: Shedding
- Players: 2+
- Skills: Tactics and communication
- Cards: 52 (originally 28)
- Deck: French
- Play: Clockwise and counter-clockwise
- Playing time: Various
- Chance: Medium

Related games
- Mau Mau • Uno • Whot

Crazy Eights is a card game for two to seven players and the best known American member of the Eights Group which also includes Switch, Mau-Mau, Whot!, and Uno. The object of the game is to be the first player to discard all of their cards.

Originally this was played primarily by children with the left over cards not used in Euchre. Now a standard 52-card deck is used when there are five or fewer players. When there are more than five players, two decks are shuffled together and all 104 cards are used.

== Origins ==
The game first appeared as Eights in the 1930s, and the name Crazy Eights dates to the 1940s, derived from the United States military designation for discharge of mentally unstable soldiers, Section 8. It may have derived from the German game of Mau-Mau.

There are many variations of the basic game, under names including Craits, Last card, and Switch. Bartok, Mao, Taki, and Uno add further elements to the game.

David Parlett describes Crazy Eights as "not so much a game as a basic pattern of play on which a wide variety of changes can be rung," noting that players can easily invent and explore new rules.

== Basic play ==
Five cards are dealt to each player (or seven in a two-player game). The remaining cards of the deck are placed face down at the center of the table as the stock pile. The top card is then turned face up to start the game as the first card in the discard pile.

Players discard by matching rank or suit with the top card of the discard pile, starting with the player left of the dealer. They can also play any 8 at any time, which allows them to declare the suit that the next player is to play; that player must then follow the named suit or play another 8. If a player is unable to play, that player draws cards from the stock pile until a play can be made, or until the stock pile is exhausted. If the player cannot play when the stock pile is exhausted, that player must pass the turn to the player on the left. Other variations have players limit the maximum number of cards drawn. A player may draw from the stock pile at any time, even when holding one or more playable cards.

As an example: If the top card on the discard pile is 6♣, the next player can:

1. play any 6 (i.e. 6♦, 6♥ or 6♠)
2. play any club
3. play any 8, then declare a new suit
4. draw from the stockpile until a play can be made

If the stock pile runs out, all played cards except for the top one are reshuffled to form a new stock.

The game ends as soon as one player has emptied their hand. That player collects a payment from each opponent equal to the point score of the cards remaining in that opponent's hand. 8s score 50, court cards 10 and all other cards face value. If the players run out of cards in the deck, the player with the lowest point score in their hand scores the difference between that hand and each opponent's hand.

The winner of the game is the first player to reach a specific number of points. The number of points needed to win is calculated by multiplying the number of players by 50. So, for two players it is 100 points, three players 150, four 200, five 250, six 300 and for seven players 350.

== Variations ==
Card game historian John McLeod describes Crazy Eights as "one of the easiest games to modify by adding variations", and many variant rules exist. Common rules applied to cards include:

Queens skip
Playing a Queen causes the next player to miss their turn.
Aces reverse direction
Playing an Ace reverses the direction of play.
Draw 2
Playing a two forces the next player to draw two cards, unless they can play another two. Multiple twos "stack"; if a two is played in response to a two, the next player must draw four.

If the game ends on a special card, that card's rule is not applied.

A popular variant of the game in the United States is Crazy Eights Countdown, where players start with a score of 8. A player's score determines how many cards they are dealt at the start of each round, and which rank of card is wild for them. (So initially, all players are dealt eight cards and 8s are wild for everyone; after one round, one player will be dealt seven cards and 7s will be wild for them, but 8s will be wild for everyone else.) The first player to reduce their score to zero wins the game.

== See also ==
- Craits
- Uno (card game)
- Switch (card game)
- Mau Mau (card game)
- Macau (card game)
- Taki (card game)
- Whot!
- Yaniv
