= Mau-Mau (card game) =

Card game

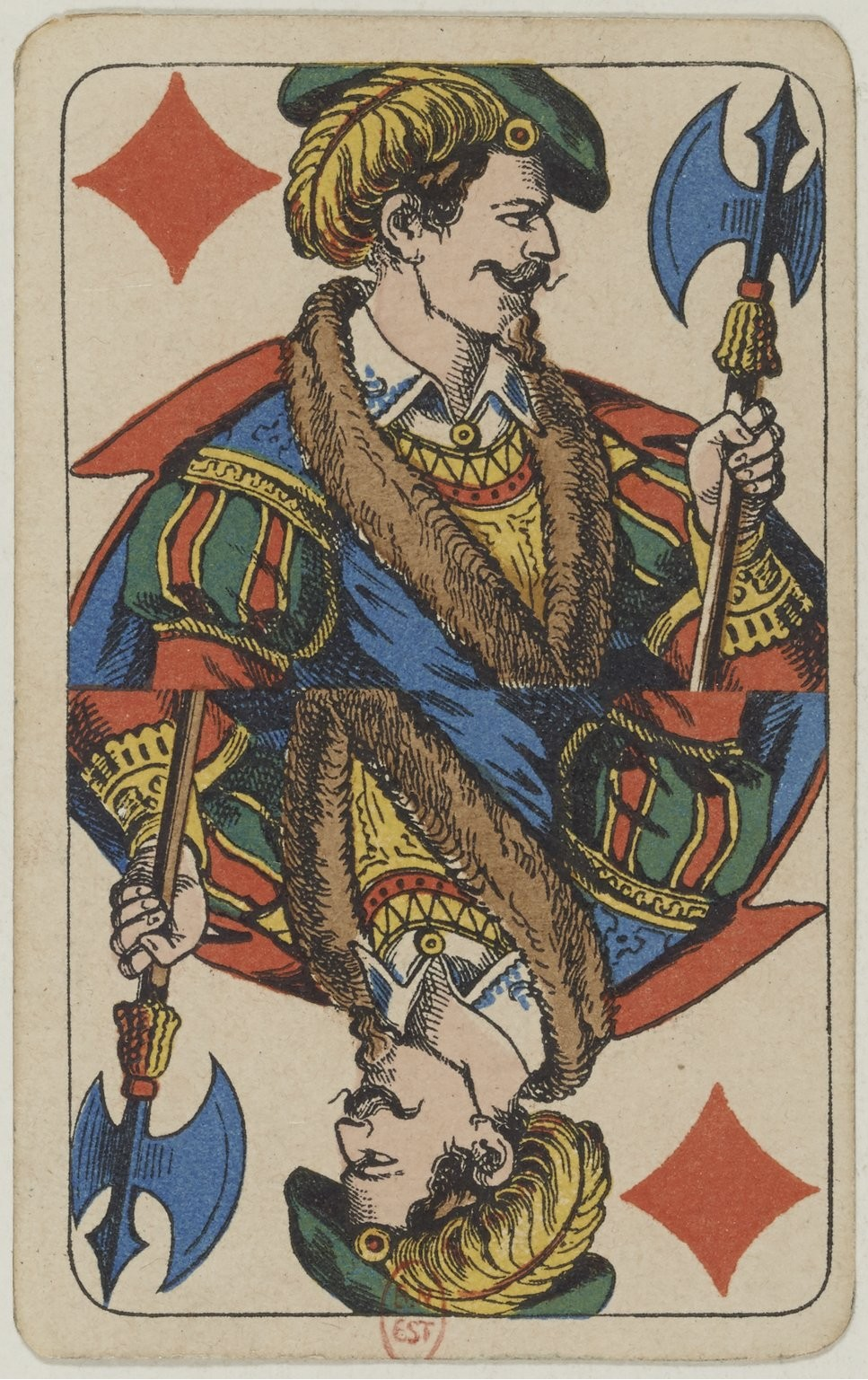
- If a player's final card is a Jack, they must call "Mau Mau".
- Type: Shedding-type
- Family: First-out wins
- Players: 2+
- Skills: Tactics, communication
- Age range: 6+
- Cards: 32 or 36
- Deck: French or German pack
- Rank (high→low): A K Q J 10 9 8 7 A K O U 10 9 8 7 A H V B 10 9 8 7
- Play: Clockwise
- Playing time: Various
- Chance: Medium

Related games
- Switch • Crazy Eights • Whot!

Mau-Mau is a card game for two or more players that is popular in Germany, Austria, South Tyrol, the United States, Brazil, Greece, Czech Republic, Slovakia, Israel, and the Netherlands. Mau-Mau is a member of the shedding family, to which the game Crazy Eights with the proprietary card game Uno belongs. Other similar games are Whot! or Switch. However, Mau-Mau is played with standard French or German-suited playing cards.

== History ==
Mau-Mau surfaced in Germany shortly after the Second World War. In 1961, it was still "a very recent game" that had gained "astonishing popularity within just a few years".

Its rules were first published in 1958 and although "it appeared quite suddenly... anyone who has played it once will be enthralled by it... Its particular charm lies in its cheerful, light entertaining character and perfectly refined simplicity. Anyone can play it in five minutes".

== Rules ==
The game is typically played with a 32-card pack, either a French-suited pack from which the Twos, Threes, Fours, Fives and Sixes have been removed or, especially in Europe, with a 32-card German pack. For more than five players, two packs of cards may be used.

The aim is to be first to get rid of all of one's cards. Most of the time, the winner will have to say something at this point, usually "Mau". If the winner fails to say this, they do not win and instead must take penalty cards. If a player's last card is a Jack, they must reply differently, usually saying "Mau Mau".

Before the start of the game, a player who is not the dealer cuts the deck four times. If the player cuts 1–3 significant cards, they are allowed to keep them if they want. However, if four cards where the cards are cut are found to be power cards, the deck needs to be reshuffled and the cut is repeated. The players are each dealt a hand of cards (usually 5 or 6). The rest is placed face down as the stock or stack. At the beginning of the game the topmost card is revealed and placed face up on the table then the players take it in turns to play their cards.

A card can only be played if it corresponds to the suit or value of the face-up card. For example, if it is the 10 of spades, only another spade or another 10 can be played (but see below for Jacks). If a player is not able to do this, they draw one card from the stack; If they can play this card, they may do so; otherwise, they keep the drawn card and their turn ends. When the drawing stack is empty, the playing stack (except for the topmost card) is shuffled and turned over to serve as a new drawing stack.

The 7, 8, Jack, and Ace of all suits are significant cards:

- If a 7 is played, the next player has to draw two cards but may play. (A variant of the game allows the player facing the 7 to play another 7, in which case the player to their left must take 4 cards from the pack, unless they play a 7 too, in which case the player to their left must take 6 cards from the pack, unless they also play a 7, in which case the player to their left must take 8 cards from the pack.)
- Any 8 forces the next player to miss their turn. (A variant of the game allows the player facing the 8 to play another 8, in which case the next player after them must play another 8 or miss a turn, etc.)
- A Jack of any suit is the equivalent of a Joker and can be played on any card. The player who plays it then chooses a card suit. The next player then plays as if the Jack was of the chosen suit. (A variant of the game forbids Jacks from being placed on top of other Jacks)
- If an Ace is played, one other card must be played with it. If the player does not have another card, or cannot follow in suit or number, then the player must take a card from the pack. If a player's final card is an Ace, they cannot win on that turn.
- When a player has only one card left, they must say "Mau" (even if it is an Ace); if that card is a Jack, they must say "Mau-Mau". Failure means that the player must take a card.
- If the game is scored, and the winning card is a Jack, then all points against the losers are doubled.

== Variants ==
=== Austria and Bavaria ===
In Austria and Bavaria, a variation is the 32-card game known as Neuner ("Nines"); in this variation, a Joker is added and the Nines are used as wild cards.

=== Czech Republic ===
The most popular variant of this game in the Czech Republic is called Prší (raining in Czech). It is played with a deck of 32 German cards (four card suits, values from 7 to Ace) and has almost identical rules with several differences:

- Players are dealt four cards each.
- Ace forces the next player to skip their turn.
- 7 forces the next player to draw two cards, unless they too play a 7, thus requiring the next player to draw four cards and so on. A player who draws cards cannot play a card in the same turn.
- In some rules, ♠K forces the next player to draw 4 cards. They may play ♠7 to pass the penalty on to the next player who must draw 6 cards or play another 7 and so on. subsequent player, etc. Similarly, ♠K may be played on ♠7 instead of another 7.
- An Ober (svršek) can be played on any card except a 7 or Ace and its player may then choose a suit. The next player then plays as if the Ober was of the chosen suit.
- In some variations, an Unter (spodek) cannot be played on any card (it has no special meaning).
- There is no requirement for a player to announce that they only have one card left. (Though it is accepted to say Prší as a celebration.)
- In some variation, when ♥10 is played all other players take a card and the player who played it plays again.
- In some variations, when a player gets rid of their cards, the player may be returned to the game if they would have taken cards because of ♥7 specifically (or ♥10 from the variation above). Thus the player truly wins only when they haven't had a card in their hand for one whole additional round. (Saying Prší is acceptable every time a person loses all their cards)

Some may play with less common modifications:

==== Variation: Quick ====
A player can play multiple cards at once if these requirements apply:

- The Posted power cards have the same rank
- The bottom card can be played according to already known rules

Playing multiple power cards at once is typically treated as playing a single one. The exception is sevens, where the number of cards for the next player to draw accumulates, so the next player has to draw 2 times the number of played sevens, or play another seven. (When playing the variation with ♥10 being a power card, rules differ from group to group.)

With certain combinations of homebrew rules and 5 or more players it is possible that somebody has to draw more cards than are available on the table. Solutions include adding more decks to the game or decreasing the penalties of power cards.

==== Variation: Blind ====
Players play cards face-down. The card's rank and suit is spoken by the player.

- If the next player believes the first one, the card is accepted as "canon" and game continues.
- If the next player does not believe the card is as specified by the first player, the card is revealed.
- If the first player told the truth, the next player is penalized: they must draw one or more cards, miss their turn, and so on (the details vary in different versions of the game).
- If the first player lied, the first player is penalized (they usually return the card to their hand and miss their turn, draw one or more additional cards, or similar)

=== Iran ===
The game known as هفت خبیث (Evil Seven in Persian) in Iran is a variation of Mau-Mau, sharing similar mechanics and utilizing Jacks and Sevens in the same manner. However, there are a few notable distinctions:

- When an Ace is played, it results in the subsequent player missing their turn.
- If an Eight is played, another card must be played simultaneously. Failure to do so, whether due to lack of another card or inability to match the suit or number, requires the player to draw a card from the deck. Importantly, if a player's final card happens to be an Eight, they cannot declare victory during that turn.
- Playing a Ten causes a reversal in the direction of play.
- When a player plays a Two, they can choose another player and make them draw a card.
- One card left: say تک‌کارت (Single Card in Persian).

=== Netherlands ===
In the Netherlands Mau-Mau is mainly known as Pesten (meaning bullying). It is played with a deck of 54 or 55 cards (52 standard plus two or three jokers); multiple decks may be shuffled together if there are too many players to comfortably play with only one deck. The main differences with Mau-Mau are as follows, though there is typically some variation in the rules depending on the group of players.

- All players receive between five and seven cards.
- 2 forces the next player to draw two cards.
- Joker may be played on any other card and forces the next player to draw 5 cards. It may permit the next player to change suit, even if the following rule is applied.
- Playing a 2s or Jokers in succession shifts the draw to the next player cumulatively. So if the first player plays a Joker and the second player a 2, the third player must draw 5 + 2 = 7 cards (or play a 2 or a Joker).
- A 7 allows the player to play another legal card if able; if this is another 7, the player goes again (announced as Zeven: nog even or Zeven: (blijft) kleven, meaning approximately "Seven: another go" resp. "Seven: sticky").
- 8 forces the next player to skip the turn (Acht: wacht, "Eight: wait").
- Ace reverses the order of play (Aas: draai, "Ace: turn").
- A King has the same effect as the 7 (heer nog 'n keer, "King, go again")
- Jack changes suit.
- One card left: say Laatste kaart ("Last card") or knock on the table. (It's a common rule that if people forget to knock or announce their last card before the next player plays or draws that they must draw an entirely new hand, 5 or 7 cards). The final card may not be an effect card, the player must draw if it is.

=== Portugal ===
In Portugal, a variation on this game is called Puque. The rules are almost the same, with the 2 replacing the 8 as the "skip turn" card. A player must say Puque when playing their next-to-last card, and doesn't have to say anything different from end with a Jack, still getting the double score.

=== Russia ===
Variants are called Чешский Дурак (Czech Fool), Фараон (Pharaoh), Крокодил (Crocodile) or 101. Usually played with 36-card, French pack. The rules are similar to Czech and Slovak rules.

- The players are dealt five cards.
- Ace forces the next player to skip the turn.
- 7 forces the next player to take 1 card (or more).
- 6 forces to take one card (or more) and skip.
- Queen changes suit.
- (optional) 10 changes turn direction.
- (optional) King of spades forces to take multiple cards and skip.

=== Slovakia ===
In Slovakia, the game is called Faraón (Pharaoh). It is the same as in the Czech Republic with the following exceptions:

- Players are dealt 5 cards initially. The loser of a hand starts all subsequent hands with one card fewer. Once a player has lost four hands they start the next with only one card. If they lose a further hand they’re out of the game. The winner of each hand plays first on the following hand.
- A player can play several cards of the same rank in succession, for example if a heart is on top of the discard pile they could play the ace of hearts and the ace of leaves on top of it. The two aces would mean the next two players miss their turns. In some versions it is not possible for players to defend against an ace as they don't have a turn.
- If a 7 (or more together) is played, the next player has to draw three cards (or six or nine or twelve). They can pass this penalty on to the subsequent player by playing a 7 (or more) too. This subsequent player must then draw three cards for each seven played in total (unless they play sevens themself, passing the obligation to the next player and increasing it).
- The Unter of Leaves cancels out the obligation to draw cards due to sevens and can have other jacks played on top of it by the same player.
- An Ober can be played on any card. The player who plays it then chooses a suit. The next player then plays as if the Ober was of the chosen suit.
- In some variations, when a player is forced to draw three cards (or six or nine or twelve), if they draw a 7 or an Unter of Leaves in the first 3 cards they may play it and make the subsequent player draw three cards (or cancel drawing cards in the case of the Unter of Leaves), though they have to keep the cards they have already drawn and their turn is skipped.

=== Switzerland ===
A Swiss version of the game called Tschau Sepp, played with 36 cards, has existed at least since the early 1960s.

== See also ==
- Mao (card game)
- One Card (card game)
- Sedma
- Uno (card game)
- Whot!
- Crazy Eights
